= Diamond Valley (Nevada) =

Valley basin in Nevada, United States

Geography
- Country: United States
- State: Nevada
- Coordinates: 39.7592°N 115.973°W
- Interactive map of Diamond Valley

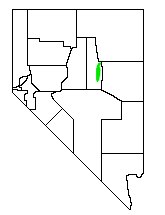
Location of Diamond Valley within Nevada.

Diamond Valley is a valley basin between the Sulphur Spring Range and the Diamond Mountains, in central Nevada, the Western United States.

== Geography ==
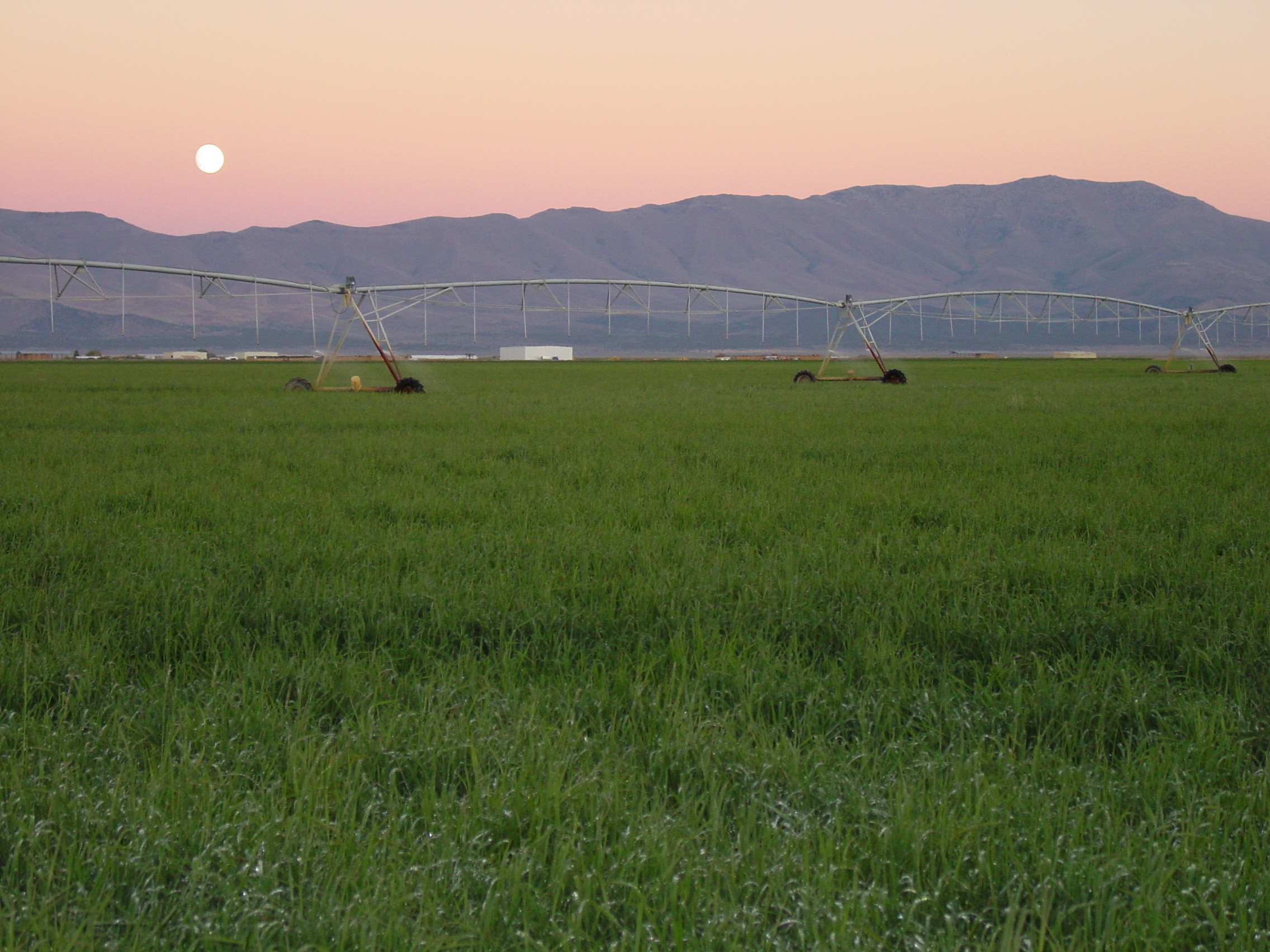
Valley in early summer: with Timothy grass hay, full moon, and the Diamond Mountains.

The valley is almost entirely within Eureka County, but the northern end crosses into Elko County. The valley is up to 12 miles (19 km) wide and over 45 miles (72 km) long.

The town of Eureka lies at the southern end of Diamond Valley, while the northern end is home to an alkali flat. Several small lakes are located in the western part of the valley near Sadler Brown Road. Eureka Airport is also located towards the southern end of the valley.

=== Climate ===
Climate data for Diamond Valley, Nevada, 1991–2020 normals, 1979-2020 extremes: 5890ft (1795m)
Month	Jan	Feb	Mar	Apr	May	Jun	Jul	Aug	Sep	Oct	Nov	Dec	Year
Record high °F (°C)	63 (17)	68 (20)	78 (26)	83 (28)	92 (33)	98 (37)	105 (41)	99 (37)	94 (34)	93 (34)	75 (24)	63 (17)	105 (41)
Mean maximum °F (°C)	54.2 (12.3)	58.3 (14.6)	69.7 (20.9)	76.7 (24.8)	83.4 (28.6)	91.9 (33.3)	96.7 (35.9)	94.1 (34.5)	88.0 (31.1)	80.3 (26.8)	66.2 (19.0)	55.8 (13.2)	96.0 (35.6)
Mean daily maximum °F (°C)	38.7 (3.7)	42.8 (6.0)	52.4 (11.3)	58.6 (14.8)	67.9 (19.9)	79.1 (26.2)	87.1 (30.6)	85.8 (29.9)	77.1 (25.1)	64.2 (17.9)	49.9 (9.9)	38.9 (3.8)	61.9 (16.6)
Daily mean °F (°C)	25.5 (−3.6)	30.1 (−1.1)	37.5 (3.1)	43.1 (6.2)	51.4 (10.8)	60.2 (15.7)	67.8 (19.9)	66.5 (19.2)	58.2 (14.6)	46.4 (8.0)	35.0 (1.7)	25.4 (−3.7)	45.6 (7.6)
Mean daily minimum °F (°C)	12.3 (−10.9)	17.3 (−8.2)	22.7 (−5.2)	27.7 (−2.4)	34.8 (1.6)	41.4 (5.2)	48.4 (9.1)	47.3 (8.5)	39.2 (4.0)	28.5 (−1.9)	20.2 (−6.6)	12.2 (−11.0)	29.3 (−1.5)
Mean minimum °F (°C)	−11.8 (−24.3)	−4.0 (−20.0)	6.0 (−14.4)	12.5 (−10.8)	20.7 (−6.3)	27.7 (−2.4)	37.1 (2.8)	34.7 (1.5)	25.4 (−3.7)	11.8 (−11.2)	−1.6 (−18.7)	−10.1 (−23.4)	−14.5 (−25.8)
Record low °F (°C)	−36 (−38)	−37 (−38)	−6 (−21)	−3 (−19)	11 (−12)	20 (−7)	26 (−3)	27 (−3)	13 (−11)	−1 (−18)	−18 (−28)	−34 (−37)	−37 (−38)
Average precipitation inches (mm)	0.77 (20)	0.77 (20)	0.89 (23)	0.96 (24)	1.12 (28)	0.68 (17)	0.57 (14)	0.43 (11)	0.61 (15)	0.67 (17)	0.51 (13)	0.74 (19)	8.72 (221)
Source 1: NOAA
Source 2: XMACIS2 (records & monthly max/mins)

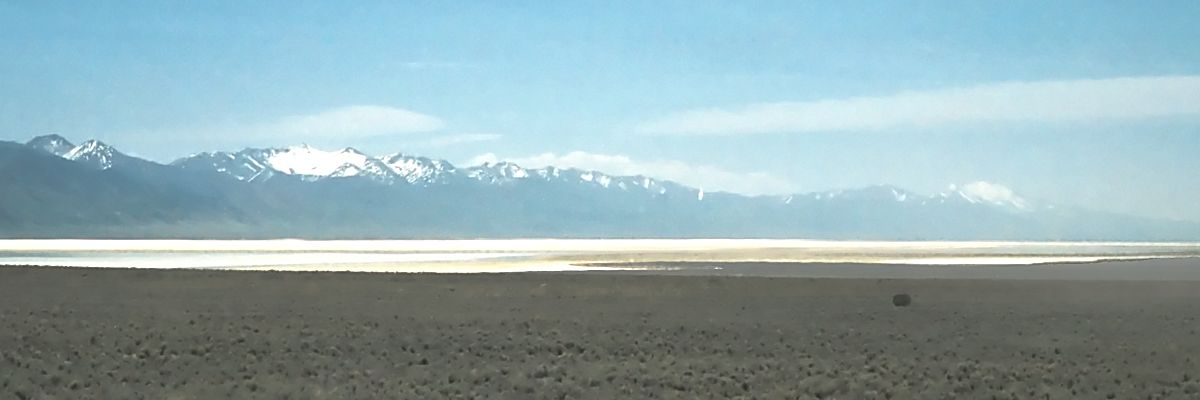
Diamond Valley with alkali flat, and the Diamond Mountains (Diamond Peak at far right).

== Agriculture ==
Diamond Valley is also known for their farms that grow timothy hay, alfalfa hay, wheat, oats, and orchard grass. The hay provides feed for racetracks, dairies, and feed stores throughout the United States and foreign export market.
