= Diamond Peak (Nevada) =

Mountain in Eureka County, Nevada, US

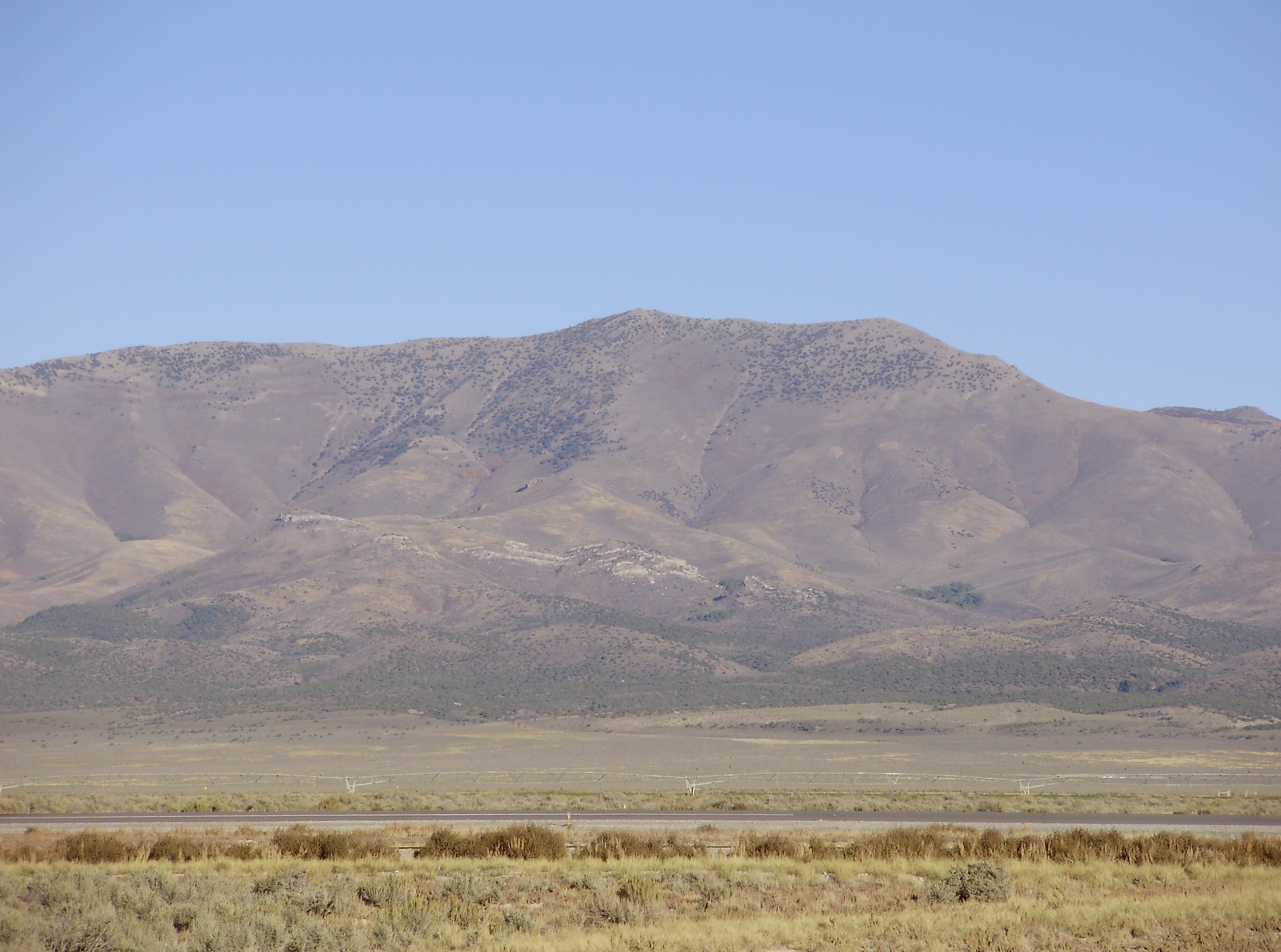
- View of Diamond Peak from Eureka Airport

Highest point
- Elevation: 10,631 ft (3,240 m) NAVD 88
- Prominence: 3,594 ft (1,095 m)
- Listing: Nevada County High Points 10th
- Coordinates: 39°35′06″N 115°49′07″W

Geography
- Location within Nevada
- Location: Eureka County and White Pine County, Nevada, U.S.
- Parent range: Diamond Mountains
- Topo map: USGS DIAMOND PEAK

Climbing
- Easiest route: From Newark Summit, north along a 4-wheel drive road and then the ridgeline, Class 2 scramble

Diamond Peak is both the highest and most topographically prominent mountain in both the Diamond Mountains and Eureka County, in Nevada, United States. It ranks thirty-ninth among the most topographically prominent peaks in the state. The peak is located on the border of Eureka County and White Pine County, about 12 miles northeast of the small town of Eureka, between the south end of Diamond Valley and the central portion of Newark Valley. It is on public land administered by the Bureau of Land Management and thus has no access restrictions.

== Summit panorama ==
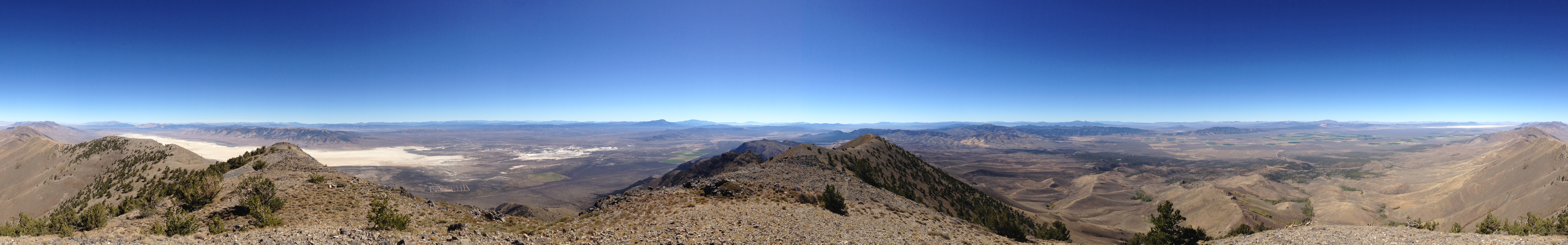
360-degree panorama from the summit of Diamond Peak
