= Roberts Mountains =

Mountains in central Nevada, United States

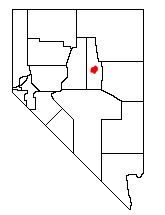
- Location of the Roberts Mountains within Nevada

Highest point
- Peak: Roberts Creek Mountain
- Elevation: 10,133 ft (3,089 m)
- Coordinates: 39°52.2′N 116°18.6′W

Dimensions
- Length: 16 mi (26 km) E-W
- Width: 14 mi (23 km) N-S
- Area: 180 mi^{2} (470 km^{2})

Geography
- Country: United States
- State: Nevada
- County: Eureka

Geology
- Orogeny: Antler orogeny

The Roberts Mountains are located in central Nevada in the western United States. The mountains are found in Eureka County, east of the Simpson Park Mountains and west and southwest of the Sulphur Spring Range. The range reaches a peak at Roberts Creek Mountain at 10,133 feet (3,089 m). Nevada State Route 278 passes the east margin of the range in Garden Valley and continues about 25 miles (40 km) southeast to Eureka.

Roberts Mountains was named after Bolivar Roberts, a division superintendent of the Pony Express. The western Peak is located to the west of these mountains.

== Geology ==
The range contains rocks deformed by the Antler orogeny of Late Devonian to early Mississippian age. Along the Roberts Mountain thrust fault, which was named for the range, a terrane of oceanic island arc volcanic rocks and sediments were emplaced over the pre-existing Devonian to Silurian carbonates, sandstones and shales of the coastal margin of the continent.

== Ecology ==
The Bureau of Land Management manages 99.4% of the Roberts Mountains, and 0.6% is privately held. Mammals found in the range include: the long-tailed vole, Great Basin pocket mouse, water shrew, and the big jumping mouse. The large spotted leopard lizard can also be found in the mountains.

Trees found in the range include: western juniper (Juniperus occidentalis), Utah juniper (Juniperus osteosperma), and single-leaf pinyon (Pinus monophylla)."Roberts Mountain". Biological Resources Research Center. Archived from the original on January 21, 2005.

== See also ==
- Roberts Mountains Formation
