= Alpha, Nevada =

Ghost town in Nevada, United States

Alpha
- Interactive map of Alpha
- Coordinates: 40.01°N 116.193°W
- Country: United States
- State: Nevada
- County: Eureka

Alpha is a former populated place located in Eureka County, Nevada. At its peak in 1874 and 1875, it had a hotel and several saloons. The town was served by the Eureka and Palisade Railroad, a defunct narrow gauge railroad. The town was abandoned shortly after the railroad was extended to Eureka, Nevada. All that remains today is rubble and the remains of cellars. A ranch at the site is visible in aerial imagery.
