= Sulphur Spring Range =

Mountain range in Nevada, United States

Highest point
- Peak: unnamed peak
- Elevation: 8,373 ft (2,552 m)
- Coordinates: 40°9′49″N 116°3′12″W

Dimensions
- Length: 42 mi (68 km) North-South
- Width: 21 mi (34 km) East-West
- Area: 452 mi^{2} (1,170 km^{2})

Geography
- Country: United States
- State: Nevada
- Counties: Eureka County; Elko County

The Sulphur Spring Range is a mountain range located in east-central Nevada in the United States. The mountains are found mostly in Eureka County northeast of the Roberts Mountains and west of the Diamond Valley and Diamond Mountains. The range lies in a north–south direction, and reaches an elevation of 7,686 feet (2,343 m) at Bald Mountain. The range crosses into Elko County at the northeastern end.

Sulphur Spring Range was so named on account of sulphur-impregnated mineral springs in the area.

The Bureau of Land Management manages 80.7% of the Sulphur Spring Range, and 19.3% is privately held. Mammals found in the range include: the long-tailed vole, Great Basin pocket mouse, and the deer mouse. The golden eagle and Mojave Desert sidewinder can also be found in the mountains.

Trees found in the range include: Utah juniper (Juniperus osteosperma), and single-leaf pinyon (Pinus monophylla).
