= Jessie Callahan Mahoney =

American rancher and Eureka county commissioner

Jessie Callahan Mahoney (also spelled as Callaghan, born May 17, 1887 – June 12, 1956) was an American rancher, Eureka County commissioner, and an advocate for women to pursue higher education.

== Biography ==
She was born Jessie Callaghan on May 17, 1887, to parents Eliza Farrell and Dan Callahan in Buenos Aires. Her parents met at the California State Fair in Sacramento. They lived in her father's homestead ranch which was named after him Mt. Callahan (or Callaghan). An accident involving a team of horses caused her father's death when she was three months old. Mahoney's two uncles loaned her mum the money to pay off the ranch. Eliza married Hugh McAfee two years later.

Jessie studied in then St. Mary’s of the Wasatch Academy in Salt Lake City.

She had a brief stint as at Waltis’ ranch near Grass Valley. She later met William Mahoney, fellow Irish emigrant from County Cork, Ireland, who came to America and worked in Reese River Valley. He supervised a massive estate in California owned by William Dunphy. The property had well over 100,000 acres by 1877. In 1915, the couple got married at a Catholic cathedral in San Francisco and Jessie went on to live with William at the Dunphy estate.

She later became a postmistress, teacher, and the Eureka County commissioner.

Jessie Mahoney died on June 12, 1956.
