= Beowawe, Nevada =

Town in Nevada, U.S.

- Unincorporated community
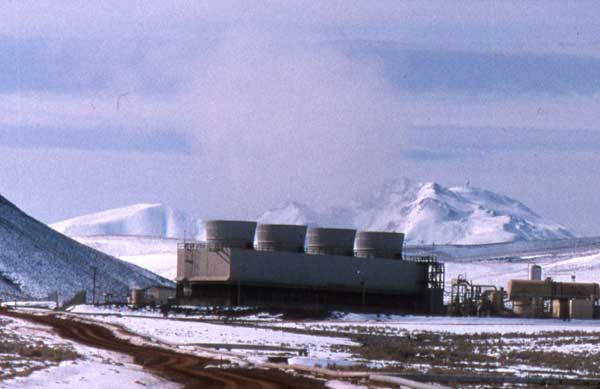
- Beowawe geothermal power plant, 1996

- Location of Beowawe, Nevada Beowawe (the United States)
- Coordinates: 40°35′34″N 116°28′38″W
- Country: United States
- State: Nevada
- County: Eureka
- Elevation: 4,695 ft (1,431 m)
- Time zone: UTC-8 (Pacific (PST))
  - Summer (DST): UTC-7 (PDT)
- GNIS feature ID: 856191

Beowawe (/ˌbeɪoʊˈwɑːˌwiː/ bay-ə-WAH-wee) is a small town in Eureka County, Nevada, United States.

== Description ==
The community is the site of a mining operation and a geothermal power plant, and has a public library. Beowawe is a Paiute Native American word meaning 'gate', so named for the peculiar shape of the hills close to town which gives the effect of a gateway opening to the valley beyond. The town is located at an elevation of 4,695 feet (1,431 m), and is situated on State Route 306 5 miles (8 km) south of Interstate 80. The Humboldt River runs through northern Nevada near Beowawe. At approximately 300 miles (480 km) long, it is the second longest river in the arid Great Basin of North America. It has no outlet to the ocean, but instead empties into the Humboldt Sink.

== History ==
Beowawe was founded in 1868 with the arrival of the railroad. Gravelly Ford, a noted site on the California Trail, is about six miles east of Beowawe on Pioneer Pass Road. The famous "Maiden's Grave" marker overlooks the ford. A tall cross in the Beowawe cemetery commemorates the burial of Lucinda Duncan, a grandmother who died on the trail in 1863. Workers building the Central Pacific Railroad first noted the grave along the Humboldt River, and in 1906, it was moved to the hillside cemetery when the Union Pacific realigned its tracks. The town reached its peak around 1881 with a population of 60 people. It consisted of an elementary school, church, post office, store, and library. In 1909, a power plant was built but, like many ghost towns, the boom had ended by 1916 and many of the residents had moved on. Currently, Beowawe is once again tied to energy production, the home to both a geothermal power plant and a large propane tank farm near the railroad.

== Geothermal system at Beowawe ==
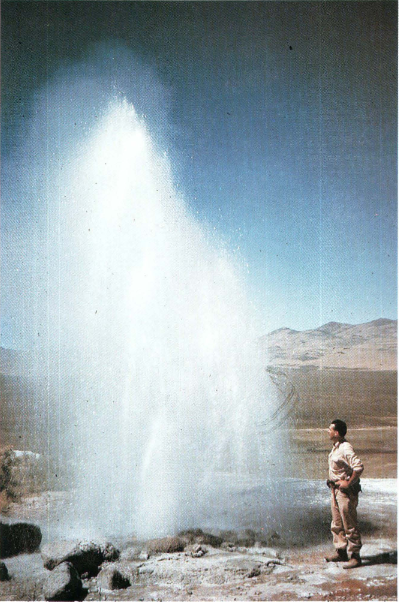
Vent 29 ("Beowawe" Geyser) erupting in 1945

Before geothermal drilling, Beowawe was the site of the second largest geyser field in North America (behind Yellowstone), with at least 28 different geysers observed. The geysers were located about 4 miles southwest of the town of Beowawe and were first described in 1869. A 1998 United States Geological Survey report described the activity of several of these geysers during the years of 1945 to 1957. Most geysers had intervals less than one hour and the tallest observed geyser, Vent 29 (also known as "Beowawe" Geyser), erupted as high as 8 to 10 m (26 to 33 ft).

In the fall of 1959, geothermal wells were drilled at Beowawe, and by September 1960, discharge from uncapped thermal wells had diverted water from the natural geysers and springs in the area, causing geyser activity to stop and springs to dry up. A few years later, in 1962, water levels were measured to be 87 to 93 m (285 to 305 ft) below ground, whereas water had previously reached the surface through natural springs and geysers. The natural features were also subject to more direct abuse, as sinter and other debris were used to fill their dormant vents as they were blamed for declining well productivity through energy loss from escaping steam. There was a brief period of renewed geyser activity in 1986 when the nearby geothermal power plant began production, but all activity had ceased by the following year.

The surface expression of the geothermal system consists of a "215-foot-high (66 m), 1-mile-long (1.6 km) opaline sinter terrace produced by hot spring and natural geyser (sic fumarole) activity along the base of the Malpais Rim. Since 1959, several companies have tested the potential of the area as a source of steam for electrical power generation. The spectacular hot water and steam plume that are present at(1985/1986) vents continuously along the top of the sinter terrace is not a natural geyser, but is a free-flowing, uncapped geothermal well." (Struhsacker, 1986, p. 111).

Photos of hot springs and fumaroles – photos '9-67' (1931) and '9-56' (date unknown) – show hydrothermal activity prior to power-generation. It is unknown if those smaller hydrothermal surface features are still active as of 2015, post-power plant development; field reconnaissance would be required to assess the activity of the hydrothermal features. Photos '9-69' (close-up, date unknown) and '9-108' (distant, 1971) show the uncapped well that is not a natural geyser, which was active prior to power-production. Geyser activity at the wellhead ceased circa 1985/1986 as the local dual-flash geothermal power plant began operations.

The man-made geyser at Beowawe in central Nevada is similar to Fly Geyser in northwestern Nevada in that both were artificially produced by geothermal drilling, but the former area was developed for clean energy production and the latter area was not. Another striking difference between the localities is an aesthetic one: more travertine has precipitated from the hydrothermal fluids at Fly Geyser than at Beowawe, generating spectacular mounds at Fly Geyser's uncapped wellhead, thus suggesting dissimilar water chemistry between the two geothermal systems.

== Climate ==
According to the Köppen climate classification system, Beowawe has a cool semi-arid climate (Köppen type BSk).

Climate data for Beowawe, Nevada (1991–2020 normals, extremes 1908–2021)
Month	Jan	Feb	Mar	Apr	May	Jun	Jul	Aug	Sep	Oct	Nov	Dec	Year
Record high °F (°C)	69 (21)	72 (22)	79 (26)	90 (32)	99 (37)	105 (41)	108 (42)	108 (42)	102 (39)	92 (33)	85 (29)	78 (26)	108 (42)
Mean daily maximum °F (°C)	40.2 (4.6)	46.5 (8.1)	56.7 (13.7)	62.9 (17.2)	73.2 (22.9)	84.1 (28.9)	94.0 (34.4)	92.7 (33.7)	82.8 (28.2)	68.6 (20.3)	52.0 (11.1)	40.3 (4.6)	66.2 (19.0)
Daily mean °F (°C)	28.2 (−2.1)	33.8 (1.0)	41.5 (5.3)	46.7 (8.2)	55.7 (13.2)	64.4 (18.0)	72.9 (22.7)	70.9 (21.6)	61.5 (16.4)	48.7 (9.3)	36.8 (2.7)	28.1 (−2.2)	49.1 (9.5)
Mean daily minimum °F (°C)	16.3 (−8.7)	21.1 (−6.1)	26.3 (−3.2)	30.5 (−0.8)	38.2 (3.4)	44.6 (7.0)	51.7 (10.9)	49.0 (9.4)	40.2 (4.6)	28.9 (−1.7)	21.5 (−5.8)	15.8 (−9.0)	32.0 (0.0)
Record low °F (°C)	−35 (−37)	−36 (−38)	−7 (−22)	7 (−14)	10 (−12)	19 (−7)	26 (−3)	24 (−4)	12 (−11)	1 (−17)	−14 (−26)	−43 (−42)	−43 (−42)
Average precipitation inches (mm)	0.95 (24)	0.79 (20)	0.88 (22)	1.06 (27)	1.28 (33)	0.64 (16)	0.25 (6.4)	0.13 (3.3)	0.47 (12)	0.57 (14)	0.76 (19)	1.00 (25)	8.78 (223)
Average snowfall inches (cm)	7.6 (19)	4.2 (11)	3.2 (8.1)	1.6 (4.1)	0.0 (0.0)	0.0 (0.0)	0.0 (0.0)	0.0 (0.0)	0.0 (0.0)	0.1 (0.25)	2.6 (6.6)	6.5 (17)	25.8 (66)
Average precipitation days (≥ 0.01 in)	6.5	5.3	5.9	5.9	6.1	1.9	1.3	1.2	2.4	2.9	4.7	5.4	49.5
Average snowy days (≥ 0.1 in)	3.2	2.2	2.0	0.8	0.0	0.0	0.0	0.0	0.0	0.2	1.4	2.8	12.6
Source: NOAA
