= Nevada State Route 306 =

State highway in Nevada, United States

State Route 306
- Gold Acres Road
- SR 306 highlighted in red

Route information
- Maintained by NDOT
- Length: 30.633 mi (49.299 km)
- Existed: 1976–present

Major junctions
- South end: East of Gold Acres
- North end: I-80 north of Beowawe

Location
- Country: United States
- State: Nevada
- Counties: Lander, Eureka

Highway system
- Nevada State Highway System; Interstate; US; State; Pre‑1976; Scenic
← SR 305	→ SR 317

State Route 306 (SR 306) is a 30.631-mile (49.296 km) state highway in Lander and Eureka counties in northern Nevada, United States. It connects the mining area of Gold Acres in Lander County to Interstate 80 (I-80) at the Beowawe Interchange near Beowawe in Eureka County via Crescent Valley. The road has been a state highway since the 1920s, having been established as part of a much longer State Route 21 by 1929.

== Route description ==
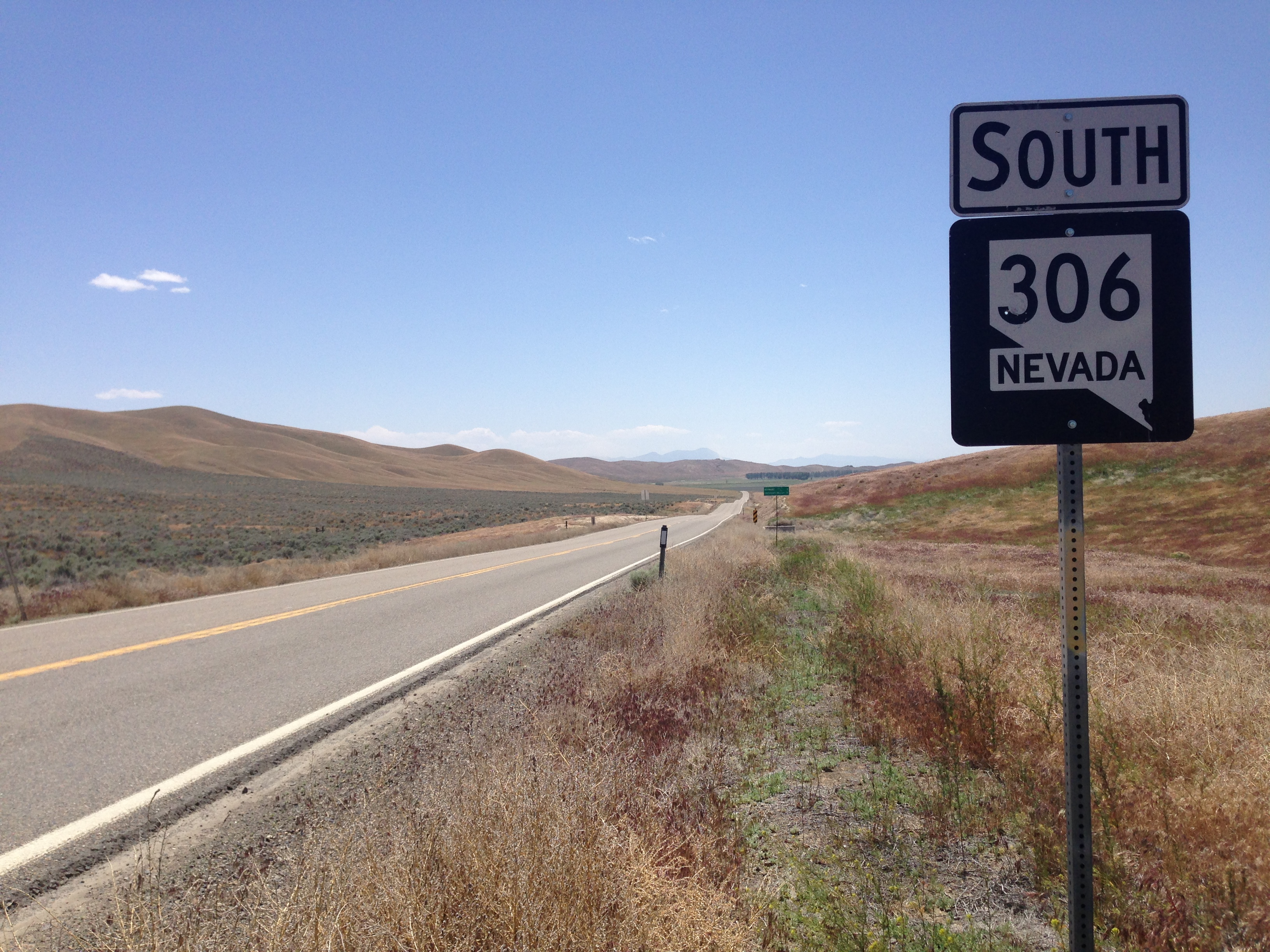
View along SR 306, north of Beowawe, looking southbound, May 2014

SR 306 begins at the road to Barrack Cortez Mine, just east of Gold Acres in central Lander County. From this point, the route heads in a north-northeasterly direction, away from the mountains of the Shoshone Range. After about 12 miles (19 km), the highway crosses into Eureka County and passes through the small community of Crescent Valley. Passing through the town, SR 306 continues on its straight course northward through the valley of the same name. The route reaches the town of Beowawe, where it crosses over the Union Pacific Railroad, and soon after, bridges the Humboldt River. The highway passes briefly through Whirlwind Valley before reaching Interstate 80, where SR 306 terminates at the Beowawe Interchange (exit 261).

== History ==
SR 306 used to be part of State Route 21

The road dates back to at least 1929. At that time, it was part of a longer State Route 21 which extended north from SR 2/U.S. Route 50 (US 50) near Austin all the way through Crescent Valley and Beowawe to SR 1/US 40 (now I-80). By 1933, the southern end of SR 21 had been extended beyond Austin, branching from US 50 just west of town and heading in a southwesterly direction towards Ione. Not counting the brief overlap with US 50, the total length of State Route 21 was around 144 miles (232 km). The entire route remained a dirt or gravel-graded route until about 1958, when the northern 30 miles (48 km) between Gold Point and US 40 were paved.

Aside from a little more paving south of Gold Point, SR 21 remained unchanged into the 1970s. However, on July 1, 1976, Nevada began a renumbering of its state highways. In this process, the paved portion of the highway between Crescent Valley and US 40/I-80 north of Beowawe was redesignated as State Route 306. This change was first seen on state maps in 1978. The rest of SR 21 remained on official Nevada maps for a short time, but was ultimately removed from the state highway system by 1982. The paved highway extending to the Gold Acres site wasn't shown on state maps until 1993. The route has remained relatively unchanged since.

== Major intersections ==
Note: Mileposts in Nevada reset at county lines; the start and end mileposts are given in the county column.

County	Location	mi	km	Destinations	Notes
Lander; 0.000–10.492		0.000	0.000	Gold Acres Road south – Gold Acres, Cortez Gold Mine Road, Barrick Pipeline Mine, Cortez Gold Mine	Road continues south beyond southern terminus
Lander; 0.000–10.492		0.000	0.000	Gold Acres Road (1,900 feet [580 m] northeast of Cortez Gold Mine Road)	Southern terminus
Eureka; 0.000–20.141	Beowawe			Bridge over the Humboldt River	
Eureka; 0.000–20.141		30.633	49.299	I-80 west – Battle Mountain I-80 east – Carlin	Northern terminus; Diamond interchange Exit 261
1.000 mi = 1.609 km; 1.000 km = 0.621 mi

== See also ==
- List of state routes in Nevada
