= Antler orogeny =

Tectonic event from the Late Devonian into the Mississippian and early Pennsylvanian

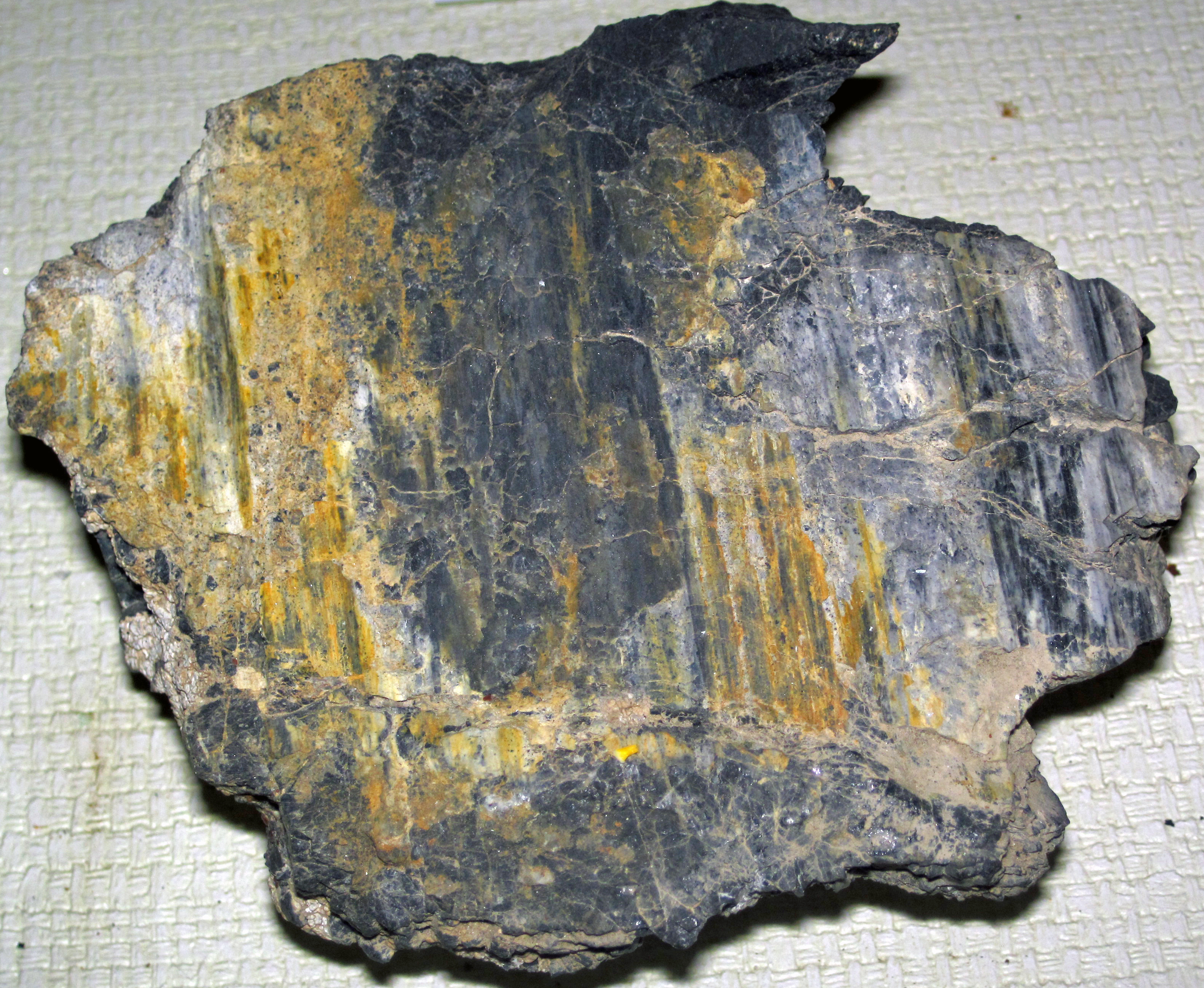
Slickenlined fault surface from the Roberts Mountain Thrust Fault (Nevada) from the Antler Orogeny

The Antler orogeny was a tectonic event which occurred in Nevada during the Mississippian subperiod of the Carboniferous. A great volume of conglomeratic deposits of mainly Mississippian age in Nevada and adjacent areas testifies to the existence of an important tectonic event, and implies nearby areas of uplift and erosion, but the nature and cause of that event are uncertain and in dispute.

Although it is regarded as an orogeny (mountain building event), some of the classic features of orogeny as commonly defined, such as metamorphism and granitic intrusives, have not been linked to it. In spite of this, the event is universally designated as an orogeny and that practice is continued here. This article outlines what is known and unknown about the Antler orogeny and describes three theories regarding its nature and origin.

A 2023 study attributed the orogeny to sinistral strike-slip faulting along the western edge of Laurentia (the craton equivalent to much of North America). Using strontium isotopes, this study found evidence for a projection ("step") of the Laurentian margin running through what is now central Nevada. This step would have tripped up the major faults, leading to brief convergence and uplift, with the northwestern block of the fault riding up onto the southeastern block. Well-dated unconformities constrain the orogeny to a narrower range of time than typically assumed, starting in the Osagean and ending in the Chesterian regional stages, with maximum exposure and erosion in the Meramecian. In other words, the event began after the Devonian and ended before the Pennsylvanian.

== Two facies of lower Paleozoic rocks ==
There are two principal facies of lower Paleozoic rocks in Nevada. In the eastern part of the state, a north-trending fossil-rich carbonate shelf of Ordovician to Devonian age, termed the carbonate or eastern assemblage, gives way westward to a contemporaneous expanse of siliceous sedimentary deposits and minor mafic volcanic rocks termed the siliceous or western assemblage. Crafford assigned these two facies respectively to the shelf domain and the basin domain. The dark color of the western assemblage, the scarcity of carbonate rocks, and a near absence of shelly fossils, are generally interpreted to indicate a relatively deep-water depositional environment. The western assemblage also differs from the eastern assemblage in its components of bedded chert, basalt bodies, barite deposits, and sulfide deposits. The nature of the two assemblages and their relation to one another are critical for an understanding of the Antler orogeny. The western facies assemblage is generally thought to be displaced from the west and to constitute the upper plate of an extensive thrust fault—the Roberts Mountains thrust. The eastern facies assemblage is thought to extend westward under the thrust plate. The basis for this belief is that the western facies domain is dotted with anomalous blocky exposures of contemporaneous eastern facies shelf strata, some of mountain size, surrounded by exposures of western facies rocks. These have been interpreted almost universally as exposures of the carbonate shelf facies in windows of the Roberts Mountains thrust sheet, and to prove the existence of that thrust sheet.

== Plate tectonics ==
From an early date, geologists have struggled to explain the presence in Nevada and adjacent areas of the Antler orogenic deposits without achieving a consensus. The advent of plate tectonic theory provided a variety of possible mechanisms by which the Roberts Mountains thrust and the orogenic deposits could be explained, but none of them has been universally accepted. As outlined in the following paragraphs, plate motion along the western margin of the North American continent in the Late Devonian has been offered as the cause of the orogeny and three varieties of it have been tried—east dipping subduction, west-dipping subduction, and strike-slip motion. None of them is without serious problems and the nature and driving force of the orogeny remain uncertain.

== Present knowledge ==
This much is known concerning the Antler orogeny:

1. Great volumes of clastic rocks were deposited in Nevada and surrounding areas on both the western and eastern facies assemblages;
2. Almost all of the orogenic deposits range in age from Late Devonian to mid-Pennsylvanian; some may be of Middle Devonian age;
3. The orogenic deposits are in a generally disconformable relation to the underlying strata;
4. Some areas within the western facies domain were first elevated and eroded, then were depressed and received a blanket of conglomeratic sediments;
5. Some clasts in these deposits were derived from areas outside the western facies domain but the bulk were derived from the western facies assemblage;
6. Blocky exposures of eastern facies carbonate rocks, of Cambrian to Devonian age, are scattered across the western facies domain;
7. No metamorphic rocks, volcanic arcs, or granitic intrusives associated with the Antler orogeny have been directly correlated with the Antler Orogeny; however, there is some evidence of arc magmatism in northern California that may be attributed. Intrusive bodies include Bowman Lake batholith, Wolf Creek granite stock, and smaller hypabyssal felsic bodies. These igneous bodies intrude the Shoo Fly Complex and date to the age of the Antler Orogeny.
8. The age of the earliest-known orogenic deposits coincides approximately with the age of the Alamo impact event of early Late Devonian age —a possibly significant coincidence.

== Origin of terminology ==
Based on stratigraphic relations near Antler Peak, of the Battle Mountains, Roberts introduced the term Antler orogeny in an abstract as follows: "The earliest orogeny, here named the Antler orogeny ... took place during Mississippian (?) and early Pennsylvanian time." That abstract was followed in 1951 by his geologic map of the Antler Peak quadrangle in the text of which he described the Antler orogeny in detail and somewhat refined its age span: "During the Antler orogeny, formations in Battle Mountain ranging in age from Ordovician to Mississippian (?) were complexly folded and faulted. As these rocks are unconformably overlain by the Battle Formation of Early Pennsylvanian (Des Moines) age, the orogeny probably took place during the Late Mississippian. The orogeny may have continued into Early Pennsylvanian, however, for the coarse conglomerates of the Battle Formation indicate derivation from a rugged highland area." In a subsequent influential paper, Roberts and others adjusted the age of the Antler orogeny as follows: "This belt is now known to have been the locus of intense folding and faulting during the Antler orogeny in latest Devonian or Early Mississippian time ..." In the same paper the authors established a connection between the Antler orogeny and a major thrust fault as follows: "A belt along the 116°-118° meridians—the Antler orogenic belt—was the locus of intense folding and faulting that culminated in the Roberts Mountains thrust fault..." That age range and connection with the Roberts Mountains thrust were confirmed in a widely quoted paper by Silberling and Roberts: "During the Late Devonian or Early Mississippian ... the Antler orogenic belt was intensely folded and faulted, and during Mississippian time the Roberts Mountains thrust sheet was emplaced." The effect of this revision in the age of the orogeny was to exclude the evidence in the Antler Peak quadrangle cited above for a Late Mississippian to mid-Pennsylvanian age, on which the concept of the Antler orogeny originally had been based, and to establish the conventional age of that orogeny as Late Devonian to Early Mississippian.

The original date of the Roberts Mountains thrust fault was post-Paleozoic. However, with publication of the 1958 and 1962 papers cited above, the authors revised the age of the Roberts Mountains thrust to coincide with the Late Devonian to Mississippian Antler orogeny and to extend the name far beyond the Roberts Mountains.

== Theories ==
Over a period of 22 years numerous reports relating the Antler orogeny and Roberts Mountains thrust to plate convergence were published in various journals, and because their basic tenets have been widely accepted, they are here termed the conventional theories. The earliest effort to relate plate tectonics specifically to the Antler orogeny was briefly outlined by E.M. Moores: "A collision of this continental margin with a subduction zone dipping away from it in late Devonian-early Mississippian time ... resulted in deformation of the pre-existing continental marginal rocks in the Antler Orogeny."

Two principal contrasting tectonic theories were published in greater detail between 1972 and 1992 as related below. One theory involved closure of a back-arc basin between the western continental margin and a volcanic arc over an east-dipping subduction zone. A second theory involved collision of the continent with an island arc above a west-dipping subduction zone. Both were based on the basic understanding that the western facies assemblage is composed of oceanic deposits and that it is underlain by an extensive thrust fault.

=== East-dipping subduction ===
Burchfiel and Davis presented the first detailed paper that explained the Antler orogeny and the Roberts Mountains thrust in terms of the subduction aspect of plate tectonics, stating: "... the paleogeography of this part of the Cordilleran geosyncline probably consisted of an offshore island complex separated from the continental slope and shelf by a small ocean basin of behind-the-arc type. Initial regional deformation within the Cordilleran geosyncline—the Mid-Paleozoic Antler orogeny—was characterized by the eastward displacement (Roberts Mountains thrust) of eugeosynclinal units from within the small ocean basin over miogeosynclinal strata deposited on the continental shelf." Their now-outdated terms "eugeosynclinal" and "miogeosynclinal" refer respectively to the western facies and eastern facies domains. In that paper, Burchfiel and Davis set the parameters for future discussions of the nature and origins of the Antler orogeny and associated thrusts. Their basic concept of east-dipping subduction was reflected in modified form by others, including Miller and others.

=== West-dipping subduction ===
Dickinson and others argued for an opposing theory, that west-dipping subduction and volcanic arc-continent collision were the fundamental processes. They stated in the abstract of their 1983 report that "The Roberts Mountains allochthon was probably the subduction complex or accretionary prism of an intra-oceanic Antler arc-trench system that faced east (west-dipping), with subduction downward to the west. Its emplacement by thrusting over the Cordilleran miogeoclinal terrane of lower Paleozoic strata occurred in earliest Mississippian time during an inferred arc-continent collision that began in latest Devonian time and is termed the Antler orogeny." Their term "miogeoclinal terrane" referred to the eastern facies assemblage. This was followed by papers offering modified versions of the same theory. Other papers supplied definitive reviews and confirmed the Antler orogeny as a result of plate convergence.

=== Strike-slip faulting ===
As an alternative to the two conventional theories described above, Ketner proposed that "(1) left-lateral strike-slip faulting along the western margin of the North American continent, rather than plate convergence, was the engine of Paleozoic tectonics in the region; (2) the Roberts Mountains allochthon, as such, does not exist, and the Ordovician to Devonian western facies assemblage was deposited essentially in situ; and (3) blocks of shelf carbonate rocks earlier thought to be exposures of the shelf in windows of the Roberts Mountains allochthon are slide blocks from the carbonate shelf. The slide blocks probably were dislodged by the Alamo impact event of Late Devonian age." In this scheme, the deep-water aspects of the western facies assemblage are due to sea-level rise in the Cambrian rather than displacement from an ocean basin.

The sedimentary effects of the Antler orogeny are well known and well described in many published reports, but the exact nature of that event and the driving force remain unsettled. Among the unanswered questions are these: what aspect of plate tectonics was involved; what effect did the Alamo impact event have; why did marine basins appear in the area of general uplift; why did the western facies assemblage, and not the eastern assemblage, include bedded chert, basaltic bodies, barite deposits, and sulfide deposits.
