= Crescent Valley, Nevada =

- Census-designated place
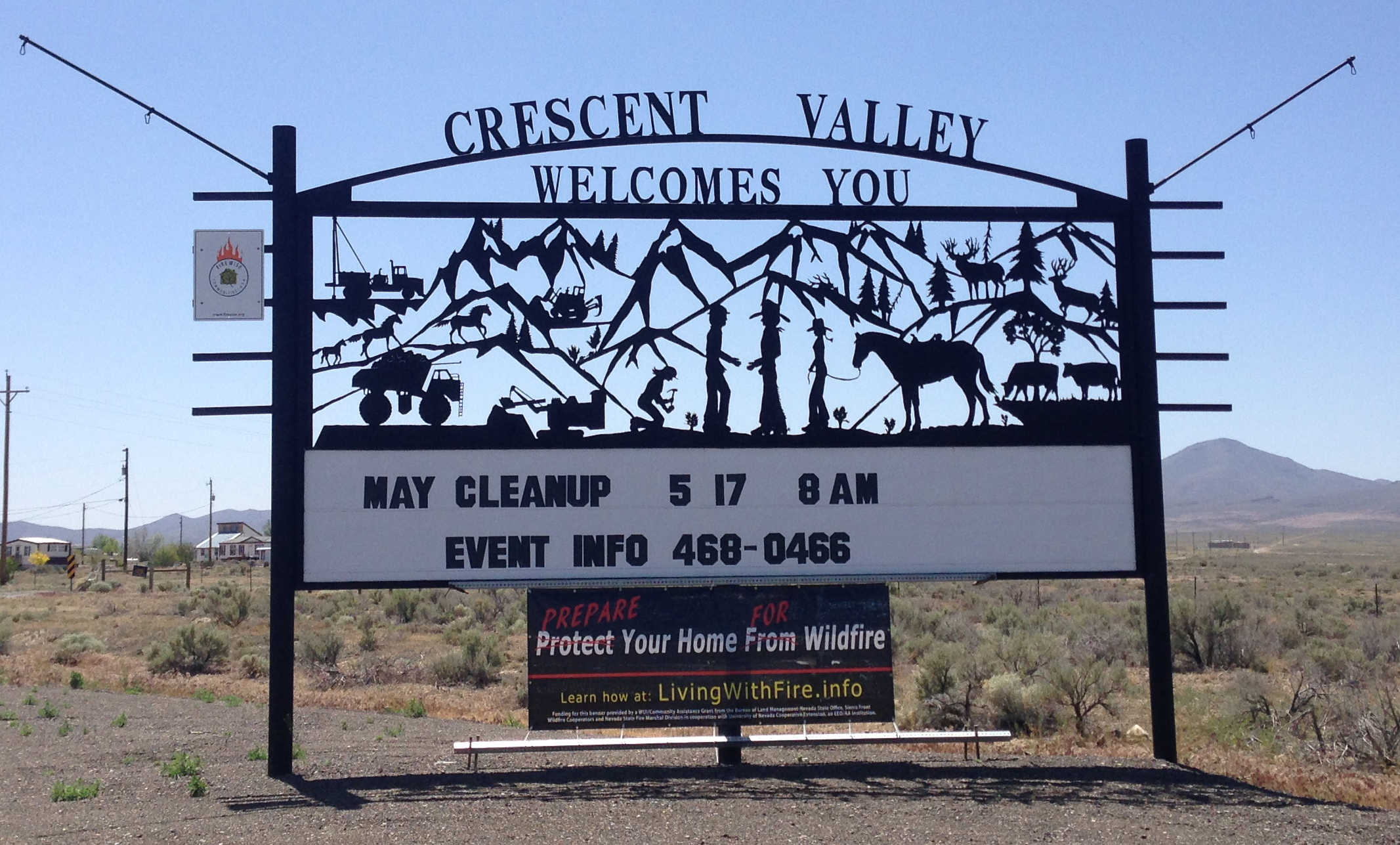

- Location within the state of Nevada
- Coordinates: 40°24′58″N 116°34′35″W
- Country: United States
- State: Nevada
- County: Eureka

Area
  - Total: 2.23 sq mi (5.78 km^{2})
  - Land: 2.23 sq mi (5.78 km^{2})
  - Water: 0 sq mi (0.00 km^{2})
- Elevation: 4,810 ft (1,470 m)

Population (2020)
  - Total: 512
  - Density: 229.6/sq mi (88.66/km^{2})
- Time zone: UTC-8 (Pacific (PST))
  - Summer (DST): UTC-7 (PDT)
- ZIP code: 89821
- Area code: 775
- FIPS code: 32-16300
- GNIS feature ID: 2583914

Crescent Valley is a census-designated place (CDP) in Eureka County, Nevada, United States, directly off Nevada State Route 306. It is the site of Crescent Valley Elementary School, Crescent Valley Fair Grounds, and Crescent Valley Community Park. The census-designated place (CDP) of Crescent Valley had a population of 483 as of the 2020 census.

Crescent Valley is part of the Elko Micropolitan Statistical Area.

== History ==
A post office had been in operation at Crescent Valley since 1963, closing in 2008. A small store at the SE corner of 2nd street and State Route 306 has one of the only “Village Post Offices” in the state of Nevada. Postal boxes to receive mail were installed at the Fairgrounds. Mail is delivered from the Post Office in Carlin, Nevada by automobile.

The community takes its name from the valley in which it is located, which in turn was named on account of its crescent shape.

== Education ==
While the only school in town is an elementary school, students who attend middle and high school are bussed to the Battle Mountain Junior and Senior High Schools in Battle Mountain. Crescent Valley enjoys an Education Index that is above the Nevada state average.

Crescent Valley has a public library, a branch of the Elko-Lander-Eureka County Library System.

== Geography ==
Crescent Valley is located along the western border of Eureka County, 19 miles (31 km) south of Interstate 80 and 87 miles (140 km) north of Austin. According to the U.S. Census Bureau, the Crescent Valley CDP has an area of 2.2 square miles (5.8 km^{2}), all of it land. The town itself is about one mile (1.6 km) in length and width with houses and streets on the outskirts reaching as far as two miles (3.2 km) south and 0.6 miles (0.97 km) north.

== Demographics ==
Historical population
Census	Pop.	Note	%±
2020	512		—
U.S. Decennial Census

== Recreation and holidays ==
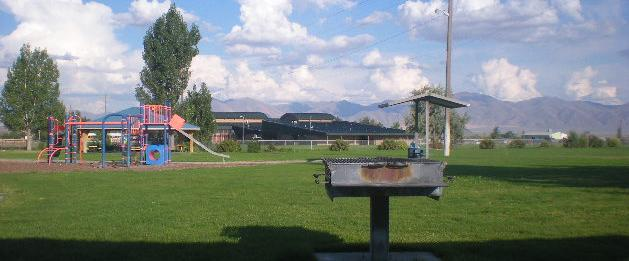
Crescent Valley, September 2009

The park in Crescent Valley is a small area consisting of two pavilions, a large area for picnicking complete with barbecues, a bathroom, a baseball field for the CVES youth baseball teams, a playground, a basketball court, and a horseshoe tossing area.

The town celebrates all holidays at the fairgrounds, also known as the community center, including "Founder's Day" near the end of June. Founders Day is the celebration of the town itself with games such as horseshoe tossing near the park and pig chasing at the fairgrounds.

== Environment ==
According to the 2010 Air Pollution Index, Crescent Valley's air pollution is below the national average.

== See also ==
- List of census-designated places in Nevada
