= Eureka Airport (Nevada) =

Airport in Nevada, United States

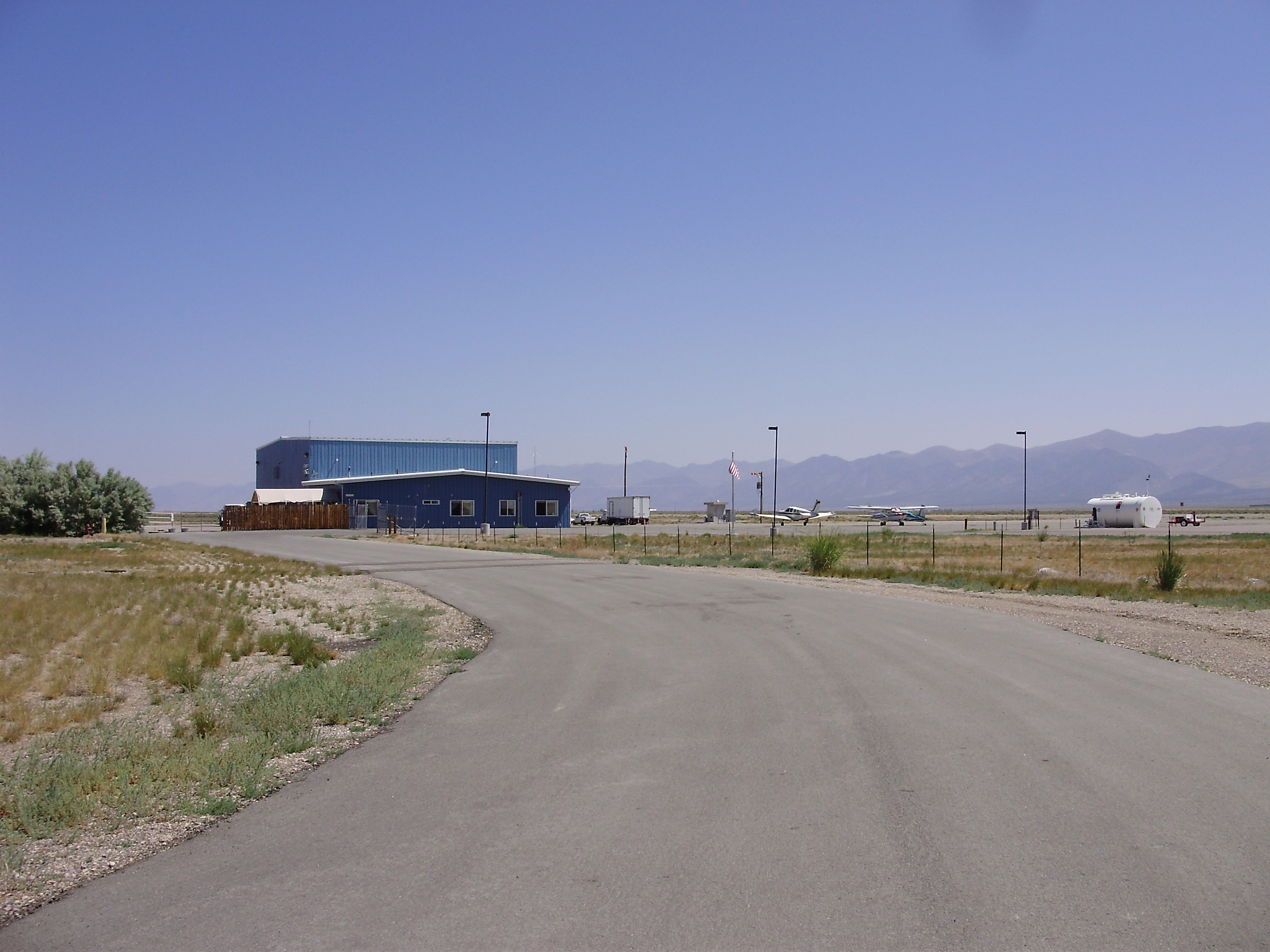
- IATA: EUE; ICAO: none; FAA LID: Ø5U

Summary
- Airport type: Public
- Owner: County of Eureka
- Serves: Eureka, Nevada
- Elevation AMSL: 5,958 ft (1,816 m)
- Coordinates: 39°36′14″N 116°00′13″W

Map
- Location within Nevada

Runways
Direction	Length		Surface
Direction	ft	m	Surface
18/36	7,300	2,225	Asphalt

Statistics (2012)
- Aircraft operations (year ending 5/15/2023): 2,304
- Based aircraft: 6
- Source: Federal Aviation Administration

Eureka Airport (IATA: EUE, FAA LID: Ø5U) is seven miles northwest of Eureka, in Eureka County, Nevada, United States. It is owned by the County of Eureka. The airport is toward the south end of the Diamond Valley.

It is also known as Eureka County Airport and in 2007 it was named Booth Bailey Field, honoring Booth Bailey, a Eureka native and founder of Diamond Aviation, the airport's fixed-base operator.

The FAA's National Plan of Integrated Airport Systems for 2023–2027 categorizes it as a general aviation facility.

== Facilities ==
Eureka Airport covers 800 acres (324 ha) at an elevation of 5,958 feet (1,816 m). Its single runway, 18/36, is 7,300 by 60 feet (2,225 x 18 m) asphalt.

In the year ending May 15, 2023 the airport had 2,304 aircraft operations, average 44 per week: 90% general aviation, 9% military, and <1% military. Six aircraft were then based at this airport, all single-engine.

== See also ==
- List of airports in Nevada
