= Western Peak =

Summit in Nevada, United States

Coordinates: 39°54′48″N 116°21′04″W

Western Peak is a summit in the U.S. state of Nevada. The elevation is 8,835 feet (2,693 m).

Western Peak lies west of the Roberts Mountains, hence the name.
