= Eureka Opera House =

Coordinates: 39.512°N 115.96078°W

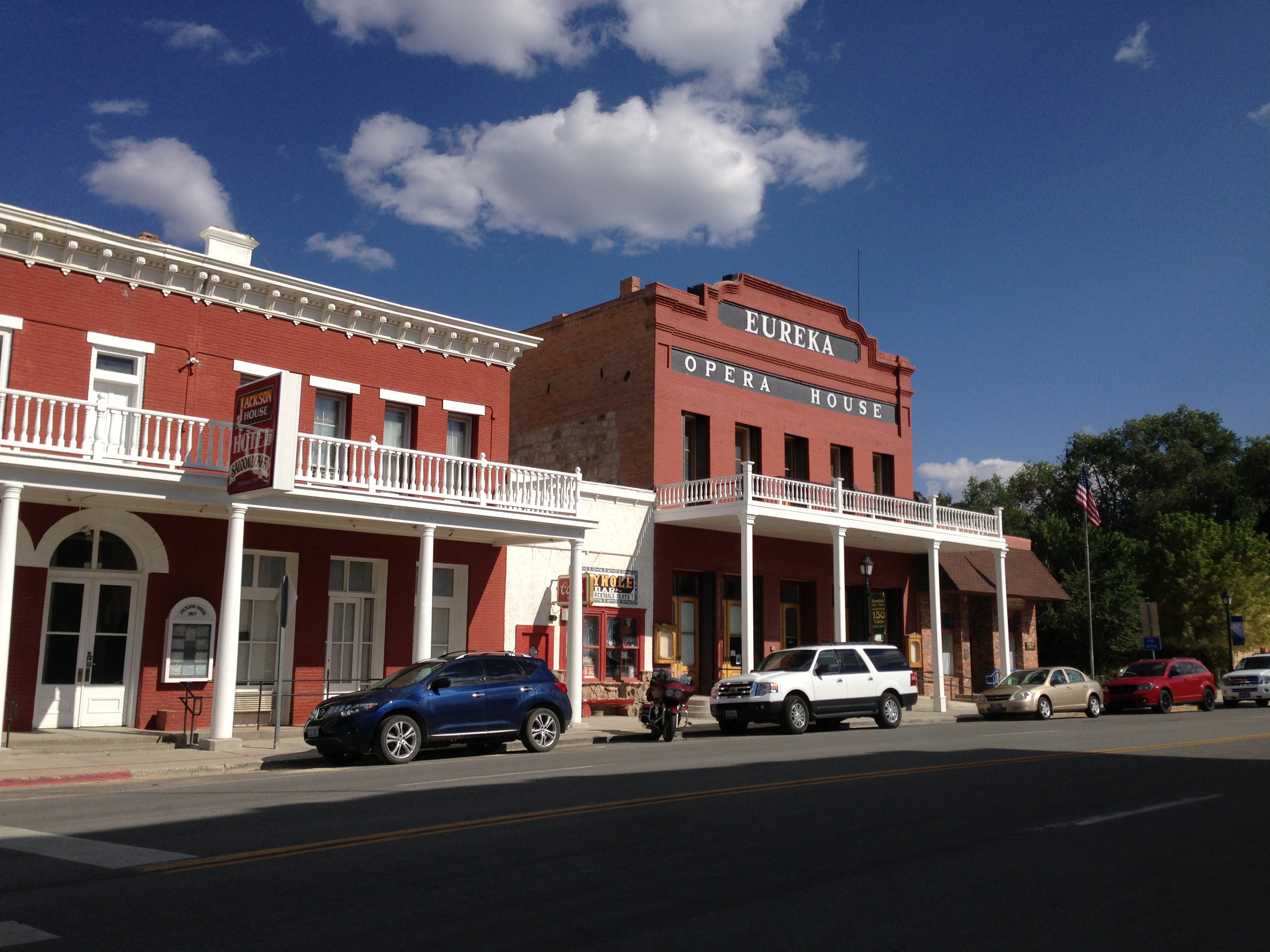

- 31 S Main St, Eureka, NV 89316, United States
- Established: 1880
- Location: Eureka, Nevada, United States
- Type: Historical site, Auditorium
- Website: www.eurekacountynv.gov/recreation-culture-in-eureka-county/opera-house/

Eureka Opera House is an auditorium and convention center in Eureka, Nevada. Built in 1880, it has remained an important center of town activities. The structure was fully restored in 1993. The opera house is the centerpiece of the historic downtown district in Eureka.

== History ==
The Eureka Opera House was built on a site previously occupied by a hall belonging to Odd Fellows. The hall burned down in August 1879, and by the following year, the Eureka Opera House was constructed and finished to replace it. When motion pictures were first shown there beginning in 1915, the building was renamed the Eureka Theater. It was later closed as a movie house in 1958. During the mining boom era, the location served as a community center for the town's dwellers. However, as the fervor died down, the structure was neglected until 1993, when it underwent a renovation sponsored by the Commission for Cultural Affairs.

== Facilities ==
As a convention center, Eureka Opera House is capable of accommodating 150 to 300 people.
