= Newark Valley (Nevada) =

Valley in White Pine County, Nevada, United States

Coordinates: 39°41.0′N 115°43.3′W

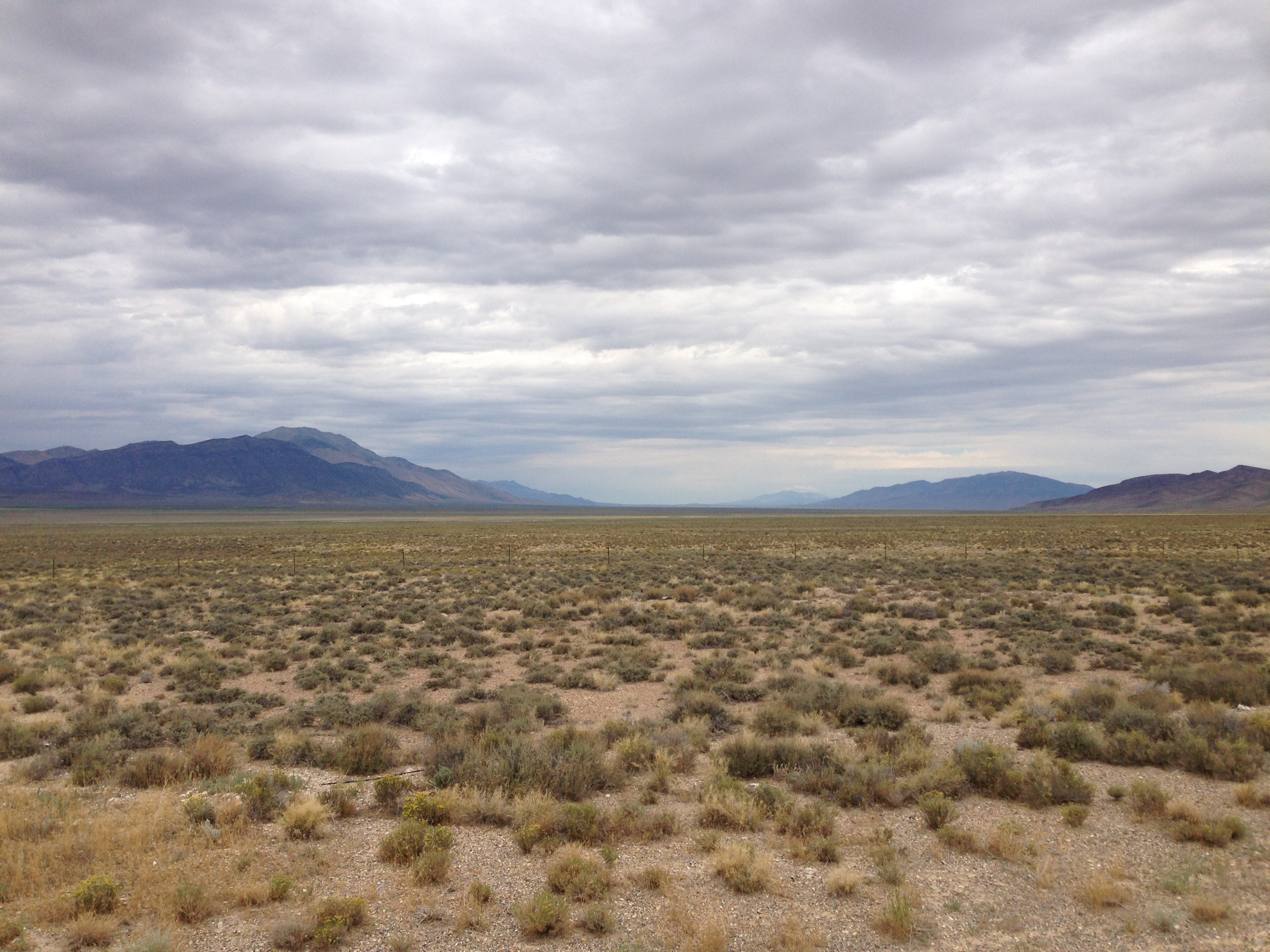
View north down Newark Valley from US 50. Diamond Peak towers over the valley on the left (west).

Newark Valley is a north–south trending endorheic valley in western White Pine County, Nevada. The valley contains the dry Newark Lake bed, which is approximately 23 km (14 mi) by 3.5 km (2.2 mi). To the west, the Diamond Mountains border the valley and to the east, various minor mountains separate the Newark from Long Valley. To the north across a relatively low divide lies Huntington and Ruby valleys.

US Route 50 crosses the south end of the valley at the north end of the Pancake Range. Nevada State Route 892 runs north from US 50 along the west margin of the valley.
