= Diamond Mountains (Nevada) =

Mountain range in Nevada, United States

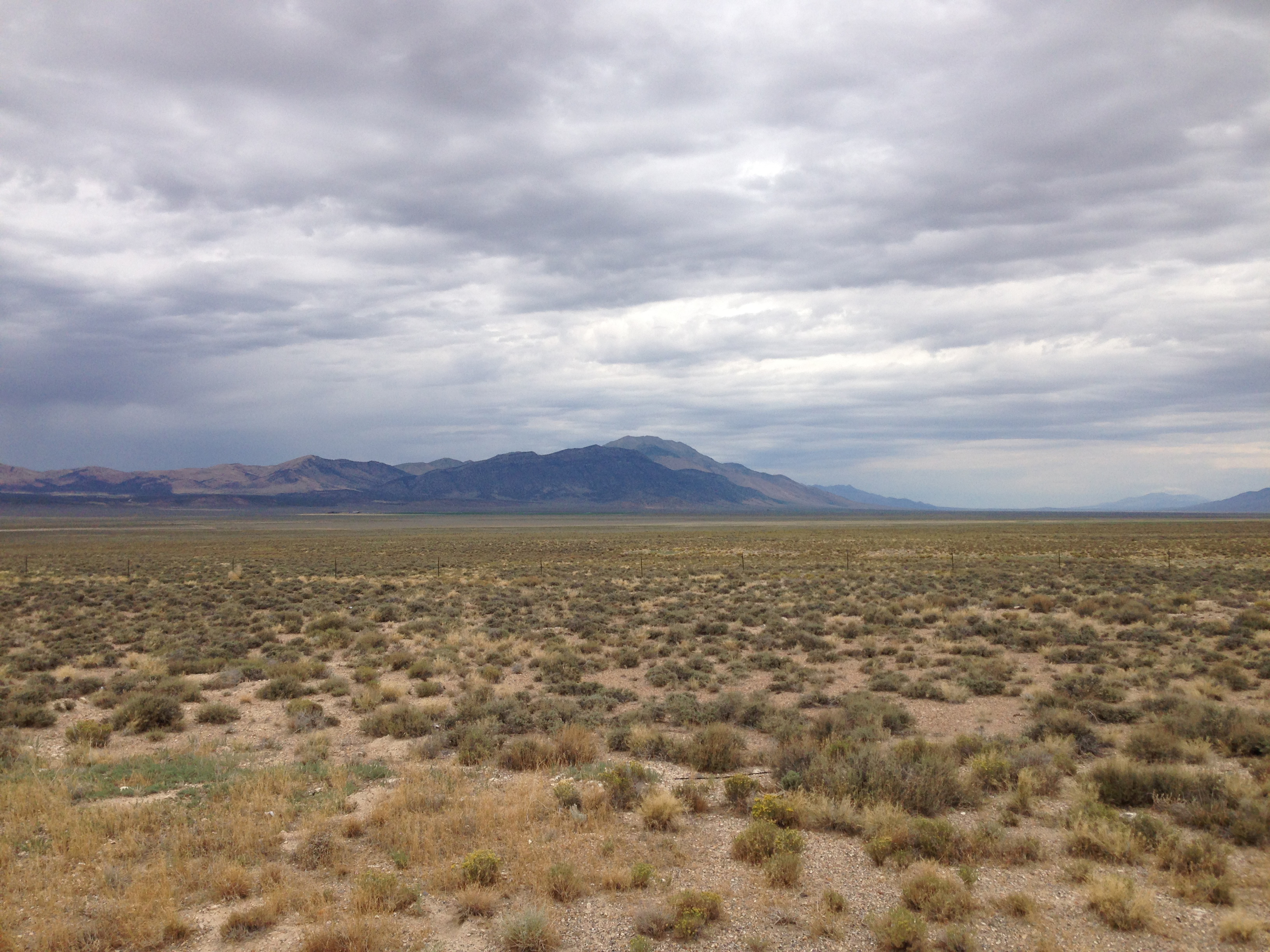
- Distant view of Diamond Peak, highest point in the range

Highest point
- Peak: Diamond Peak
- Elevation: 10,631 ft (3,240 m)

Geography
- Location within Nevada
- Country: United States
- State: Nevada
- Counties: White Pine, Eureka
- Range coordinates: 39°53′18″N 115°48′15″W
- Topo map: USGS Diamond Springs

The Diamond Mountains are a mountain range along the border of Eureka and White Pine Counties, in northern Nevada, Western United States.

== Geography ==
The range reaches a maximum elevation of 10,631 ft (3,240 m) on the summit of Diamond Peak. The range separates Newark Valley from Diamond Valley. The mountains cover an area of 293.4 square miles (760 km^{2}).

The southeastern Diamond Mountains angle southwest to meet the Fish Creek Range, and the adjacent Mountain Boy Range.

The flora and fauna are typical of higher elevation habitats in the Central Basin and Range ecoregion.

== Access ==
The town of Eureka lies between the three ranges, with unimproved roads north across Diamond Valley to access the western flank of the range. Southeast from Eureka, U.S. 50 crosses the southern Diamond Mountains, and turns eastward at the range's south end.

Nevada State Route 892 follows the eastern flank foothills for half the range's length. The route then becomes an unimproved road north past the range, then through Huntington Valley to meet Nevada State Route 228 and Elko.

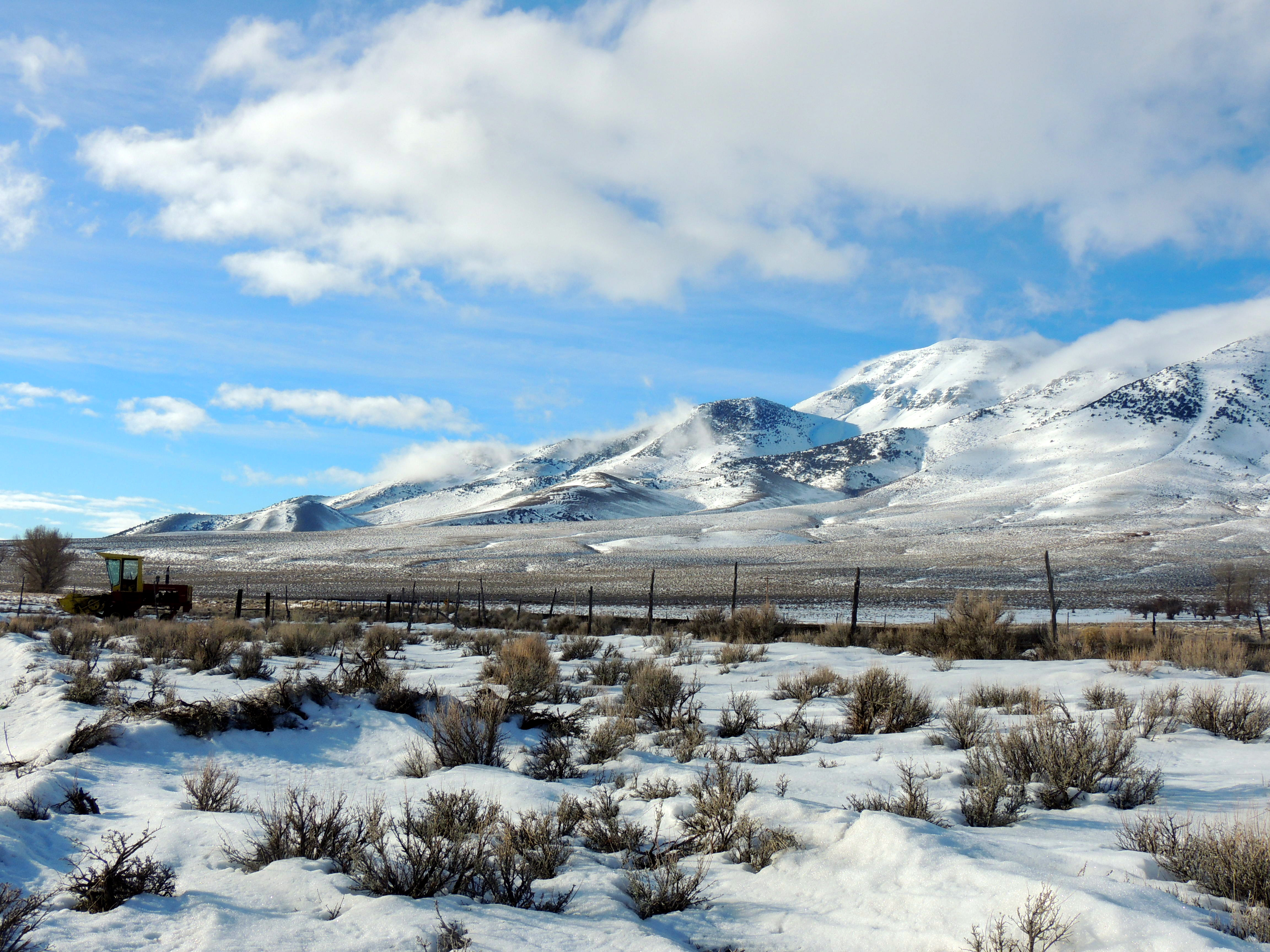
Diamond Mountains, winter 2013

== See also ==
- List of mountain ranges of Nevada
