= Eureka County, Nevada =

County in Nevada, United States

- County
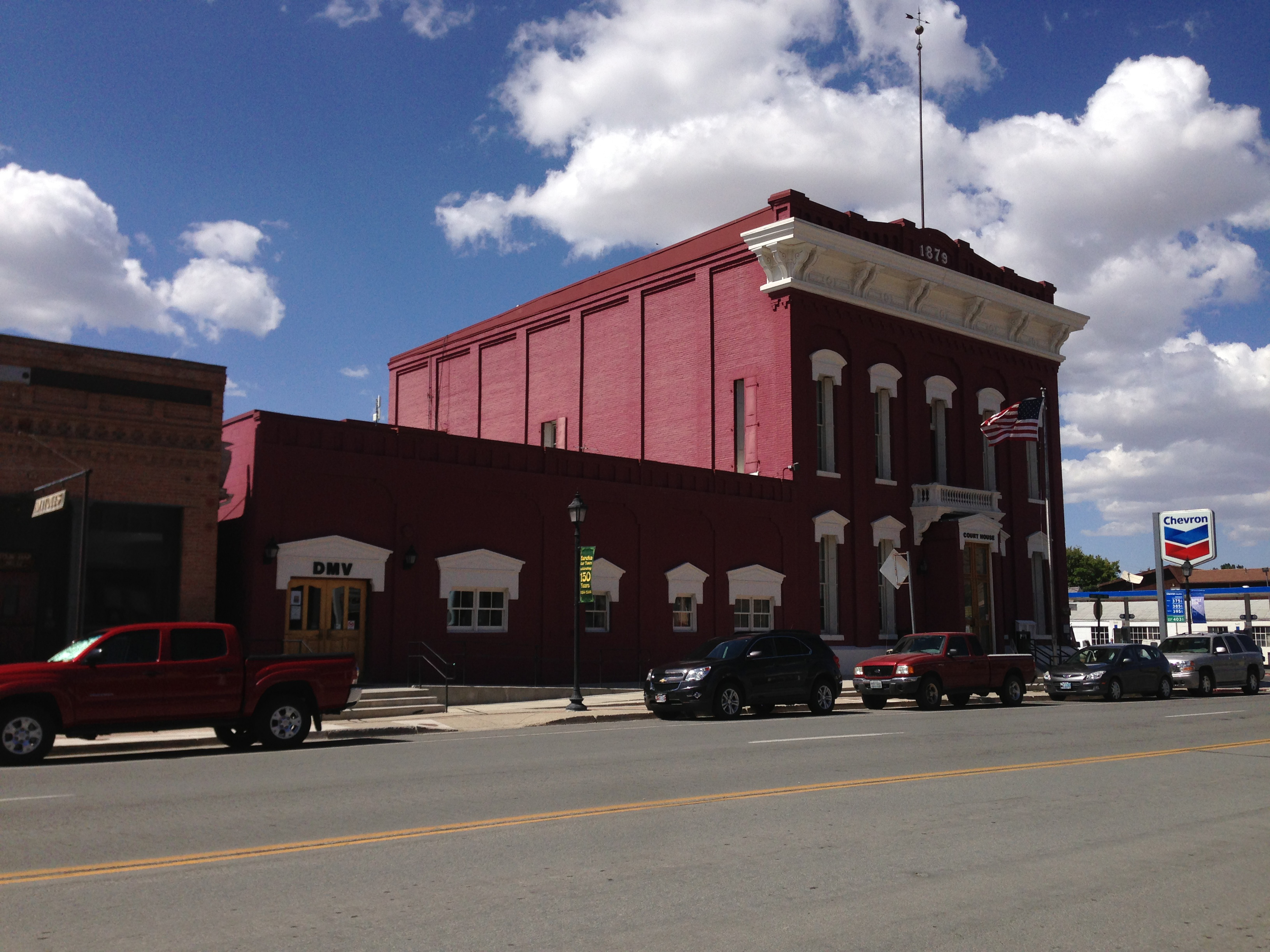
- Eureka County Court House

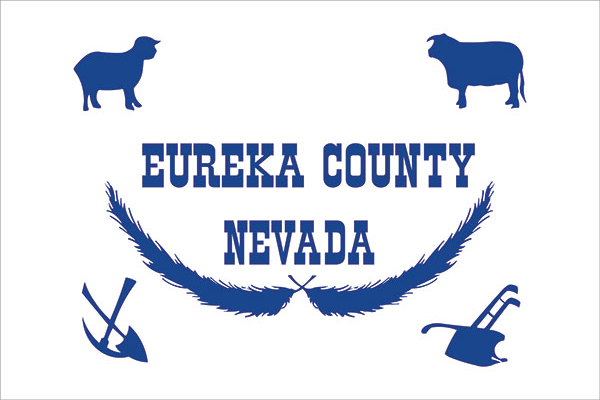
- Flag

- Location within the U.S. state of Nevada
- Coordinates: 39°59′N 116°16′W
- Country: United States
- State: Nevada
- Founded: 1873; 153 years ago
- Named for: Eureka
- Seat: Eureka
- Largest community: Crescent Valley

Area
  - Total: 4,180 sq mi (10,800 km^{2})
  - Land: 4,176 sq mi (10,820 km^{2})
  - Water: 4.3 sq mi (11 km^{2}) 0.1%

Population (2020)
  - Total: 1,855
  - Estimate (2025): 1,867 ▲
  - Density: 0.4442/sq mi (0.1715/km^{2})
- Time zone: UTC−8 (Pacific)
  - Summer (DST): UTC−7 (PDT)
- Congressional district: 2nd
- Website: www.eurekacountynv.gov

Eureka County is a county in the U.S. state of Nevada. As of the 2020 census, the population was 1,855, making it the second-least populous county in Nevada. Its county seat is Eureka.

Eureka County is part of the Elko Micropolitan Statistical Area.

== History ==
Eureka County was established in 1873 and formed from Lander County after silver was discovered more than 100 miles (160 km) east of Austin. The new mining camp's residents complained Austin was too far to go for county business and a new county was created. It was named for the ancient Greek term, Eureka, meaning, "I have found it." This term was used earlier in California and other locations. Eureka has always been the county seat.

== Geography ==
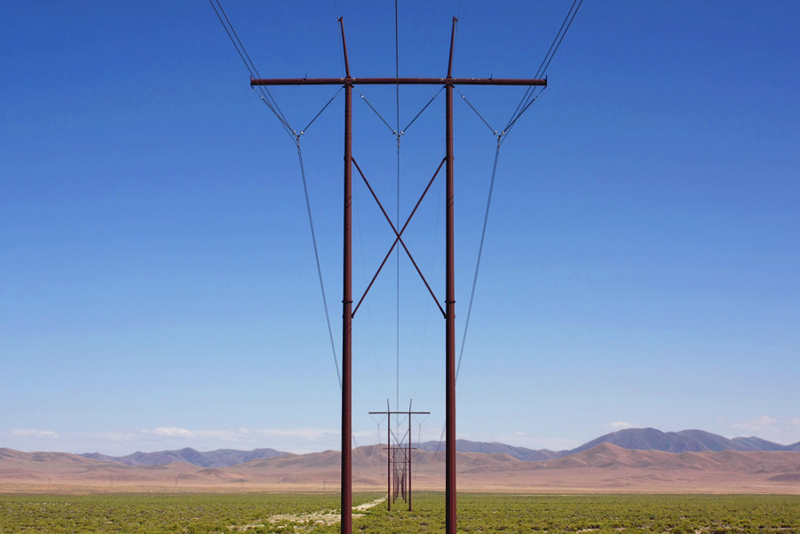
HVAC transmission towers crossing Crescent Valley east of State Route 306

According to the U.S. Census Bureau, the county has an area of 4,180 square miles (10,800 km^{2}), of which 4,176 square miles (10,820 km^{2}) is land and 4.3 square miles (11 km^{2}) (0.1%) is water.

The county's highest point is the 10,631 ft (3,240 m) summit of Diamond Peak in the Diamond Mountains along the border with White Pine County.

=== Adjacent counties ===
- Elko County - northeast
- White Pine County - east
- Nye County - south
- Lander County - west

=== National protected area ===
- Humboldt-Toiyabe National Forest (part)

=== Major highways ===
- Interstate 80
- U.S. Route 50
- State Route 278
- State Route 306
- State Route 766
- State Route 781

== Demographics ==
Historical population
Census	Pop.	Note	%±
1880	7,086		—
1890	3,275		−53.8%
1900	1,954		−40.3%
1910	1,830		−6.3%
1920	1,350		−26.2%
1930	1,333		−1.3%
1940	1,361		2.1%
1950	896		−34.2%
1960	767		−14.4%
1970	948		23.6%
1980	1,198		26.4%
1990	1,547		29.1%
2000	1,651		6.7%
2010	1,987		20.4%
2020	1,855		−6.6%
2025 (est.)	1,867	▲	0.6%
U.S. Decennial Census; 1790-1960 1900-1990; 1990-2000 2010-2020

=== Racial and ethnic composition ===
Eureka County, Nevada – Racial and ethnic composition Note: the US Census treats Hispanic/Latino as an ethnic category. This table excludes Latinos from the racial categories and assigns them to a separate category. Hispanics/Latinos may be of any race.
Race / Ethnicity (NH = Non-Hispanic)	Pop 1980	Pop 1990	Pop 2000	Pop 2010	Pop 2020	% 1980	% 1990	% 2000	% 2010	% 2020
White alone (NH)	1,083	1,354	1,402	1,662	1,545	90.40%	87.52%	84.92%	83.64%	83.29%
Black or African American alone (NH)	0	5	6	2	2	0.00%	0.32%	0.36%	0.10%	0.11%
Native American or Alaska Native alone (NH)	37	40	25	42	21	3.09%	2.59%	1.51%	2.11%	1.13%
Asian alone (NH)	7	10	13	18	4	0.58%	0.65%	0.79%	0.91%	0.22%
Native Hawaiian or Pacific Islander alone (NH)	x	x	1	0	3	x	x	0.06%	0.00%	0.16%
Other race alone (NH)	3	0	0	1	11	0.25%	0.00%	0.00%	0.05%	0.59%
Mixed race or Multiracial (NH)	x	x	46	24	91	x	x	2.79%	1.21%	4.91%
Hispanic or Latino (any race)	68	138	158	238	178	5.68%	8.92%	9.57%	11.98%	9.60%
Total	1,198	1,547	1,651	1,987	1,855	100.00%	100.00%	100.00%	100.00%	100.00%

=== 2020 census ===
As of the 2020 census, the county had a population of 1,855. The median age was 44.8 years, 21.9% of residents were under the age of 18, and another 21.9% were 65 years of age or older; for every 100 females there were 122.2 males, and for every 100 females age 18 and over there were 120.5 males age 18 and over. No residents lived in urban areas, while 100.0% lived in rural areas.

The racial makeup of the county was 85.0% White, 0.2% Black or African American, 1.2% American Indian and Alaska Native, 0.2% Asian, 0.2% Native Hawaiian and Pacific Islander, 2.9% from some other race, and 10.4% from two or more races; Hispanic or Latino residents of any race comprised 9.6% of the population.

There were 802 households in the county, of which 28.9% had children under the age of 18 living with them and 14.6% had a female householder with no spouse or partner present; about 31.1% of all households were made up of individuals and 13.7% had someone living alone who was 65 years of age or older.

There were 962 housing units, of which 16.6% were vacant; among occupied housing units, 70.8% were owner-occupied and 29.2% were renter-occupied. The homeowner vacancy rate was 1.5% and the rental vacancy rate was 8.8%.

=== 2010 census ===
At the 2010 census, there were 1,987 people, 836 households, and 495 families living in the county. The population density was 0.5 inhabitants per square mile (0.19/km^{2}). There were 1,076 housing units at an average density of 0.3 units per square mile (0.12 units/km^{2}). The racial makeup of the county was 89.3% white, 2.4% American Indian, 0.9% Asian, 0.1% black or African American, 5.1% from other races, and 2.2% from two or more races. Those of Hispanic or Latino origin made up 12.0% of the population. In terms of ancestry, 43.3% were American, 14.8% were German, 11.4% were Irish, 7.3% were English, and 6.9% were Italian.

Of the 836 households, 27.3% had children under the age of 18 living with them, 51.6% were married couples living together, 4.2% had a female householder with no husband present, 40.8% were non-families, and 33.0% of households were made up of individuals. The average household size was 2.38 and the average family size was 3.07. The median age was 42.4 years.

The median household income was $61,400 and the median family income was $75,179. Males had a median income of $54,625 versus $42,321 for females. The per capita income for the county was $30,306. About 9.9% of families and 16.2% of the population were below the poverty line, including 23.6% of those under age 18 and 13.9% of those age 65 or over.

=== 2000 census ===
At the 2000 census there were 1,651 people, 666 households, and 440 families living in the county. The population density was 0.39 people per square mile (0.15 people/km^{2}). There were 1,025 housing units at an average density of 0.25 units per square mile (0.097/km^{2}). Of the 666 households 33.00% had children under the age of 18 living with them, 56.50% were married couples living together, 5.00% had a female householder with no husband present, and 33.90% were non-families. 29.10% of households were one person and 9.90% were one person aged 65 or older. The average household size was 2.47 and the average family size was 3.08.

The age distribution was 27.80% under the age of 18, 5.20% from 18 to 24, 28.60% from 25 to 44, 25.90% from 45 to 64, and 12.40% 65 or older. The median age was 38 years. For every 100 females, there were 106.60 males. For every 100 females age 18 and over, there were 113.20 males.

The county's median household income was $41,417, and the median family income was $49,438. Males had a median income of $45,167 versus $25,000 for females. The county's per capita income was $18,629. 12.60% of the population and 8.90% of families were below the poverty line. Out of the people living in poverty, 11.70% are under the age of 18 and 16.40% are 65 or older.

== Communities ==
There are no incorporated places in Eureka County.

=== Census-designated places ===
- Crescent Valley
- Eureka (county seat)

=== Unincorporated communities ===
- Beowawe
- Palisade
- Primeaux

=== Ghost towns ===
- Alpha
- Ruby Hill

== Education ==
Eureka County School District is the county school district.

== Politics ==
Background

Eureka County is strongly Republican; the last time it voted for a Democratic candidate was in 1964, and the last time a Democratic candidate received at least a quarter (25%) of the county's vote was in 1988. The last time a Republican candidate failed to receive a majority of the county's vote was in 1992, when the vote was somewhat split when independent candidate Ross Perot recorded approximately a third of the county's vote. In most recent elections Eureka County has shown the strongest Republican leaning out of all Nevada counties.

However, due to the county's low population, its heavy Republican voting does not have a large effect on elections in the state, as a majority of Nevada's population live in Democratic-leaning Clark County and Washoe County.

United States presidential election results for Eureka County, Nevada
Year	Republican		Democratic		Third party(ies)	
Year	No.	%	No.	%	No.	%
1904	235	62.50%	107	28.46%	34	9.04%
1908	224	46.57%	218	45.32%	39	8.11%
1912	70	16.51%	209	49.29%	145	34.20%
1916	239	45.96%	263	50.58%	18	3.46%
1920	313	63.75%	157	31.98%	21	4.28%
1924	209	50.00%	94	22.49%	115	27.51%
1928	251	49.02%	261	50.98%	0	0.00%
1932	136	26.10%	385	73.90%	0	0.00%
1936	180	31.25%	396	68.75%	0	0.00%
1940	284	44.58%	353	55.42%	0	0.00%
1944	317	59.36%	217	40.64%	0	0.00%
1948	312	51.74%	278	46.10%	13	2.16%
1952	379	70.71%	157	29.29%	0	0.00%
1956	330	64.33%	183	35.67%	0	0.00%
1960	239	51.73%	223	48.27%	0	0.00%
1964	243	46.02%	285	53.98%	0	0.00%
1968	277	56.53%	149	30.41%	64	13.06%
1972	371	72.75%	139	27.25%	0	0.00%
1976	272	58.24%	163	34.90%	32	6.85%
1980	430	76.24%	103	18.26%	31	5.50%
1984	439	75.95%	124	21.45%	15	2.60%
1988	413	70.96%	151	25.95%	18	3.09%
1992	330	47.83%	129	18.70%	231	33.48%
1996	412	59.88%	158	22.97%	118	17.15%
2000	632	75.51%	150	17.92%	55	6.57%
2004	571	77.37%	144	19.51%	23	3.12%
2008	564	75.70%	144	19.33%	37	4.97%
2012	663	82.05%	107	13.24%	38	4.70%
2016	723	84.66%	74	8.67%	57	6.67%
2020	895	88.00%	105	10.32%	17	1.67%
2024	910	87.84%	104	10.04%	22	2.12%

United States Senate election results for Eureka County, Nevada1
Year	Republican		Democratic		Third party(ies)	
Year	No.	%	No.	%	No.	%
2024	825	80.88%	107	10.49%	88	8.63%

== See also ==
- National Register of Historic Places listings in Eureka County, Nevada
- Jessie Callahan Mahoney - Eureka country commissioner
