= Eureka, Nevada =

Census-designated place in Eureka County, Nevada, United States

- Census-designated place
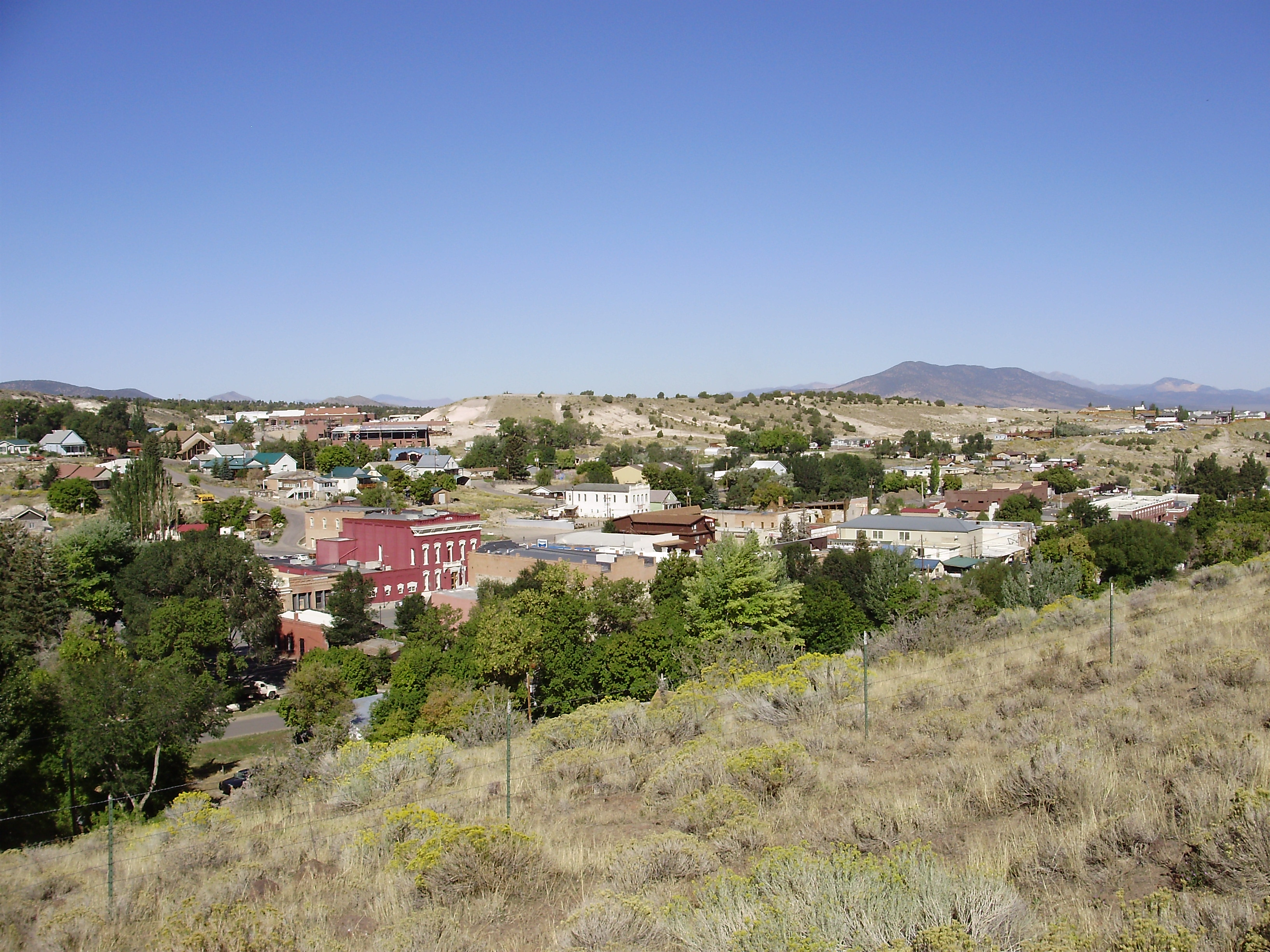
- Nickname: The Friendliest Town on The Loneliest Road
- Location in Nevada Location in the United States
- Coordinates: 39°30′20″N 115°57′52″W
- Country: United States
- State: Nevada
- County: Eureka

Area
  - Total: 1.29 sq mi (3.35 km^{2})
  - Land: 1.29 sq mi (3.35 km^{2})
  - Water: 0 sq mi (0.00 km^{2})
- Elevation: 6,674 ft (2,034 m)

Population (2020)
  - Total: 414
  - Density: 320.4/sq mi (123.71/km^{2})
- Time zone: UTC−8 (Pacific (PST))
  - Summer (DST): UTC−7 (PDT)
- ZIP code: 89316
- FIPS code: 32-23900
- GNIS feature ID: 2583922

Eureka is a census-designated place in and the county seat of Eureka County, Nevada, United States. With a population of 414 as of the 2020 United States census, it is the second-largest community in Eureka County. Attractions include the Eureka Opera House (built in 1880 and restored in 1993), Raine’s Market and Wildlife Museum (built 1887), the Jackson House Hotel (built 1877), and the Eureka Sentinel Museum (housed in the 1879 Eureka Sentinel Newspaper Building).

Eureka is part of the Elko Micropolitan Statistical Area.

== History ==
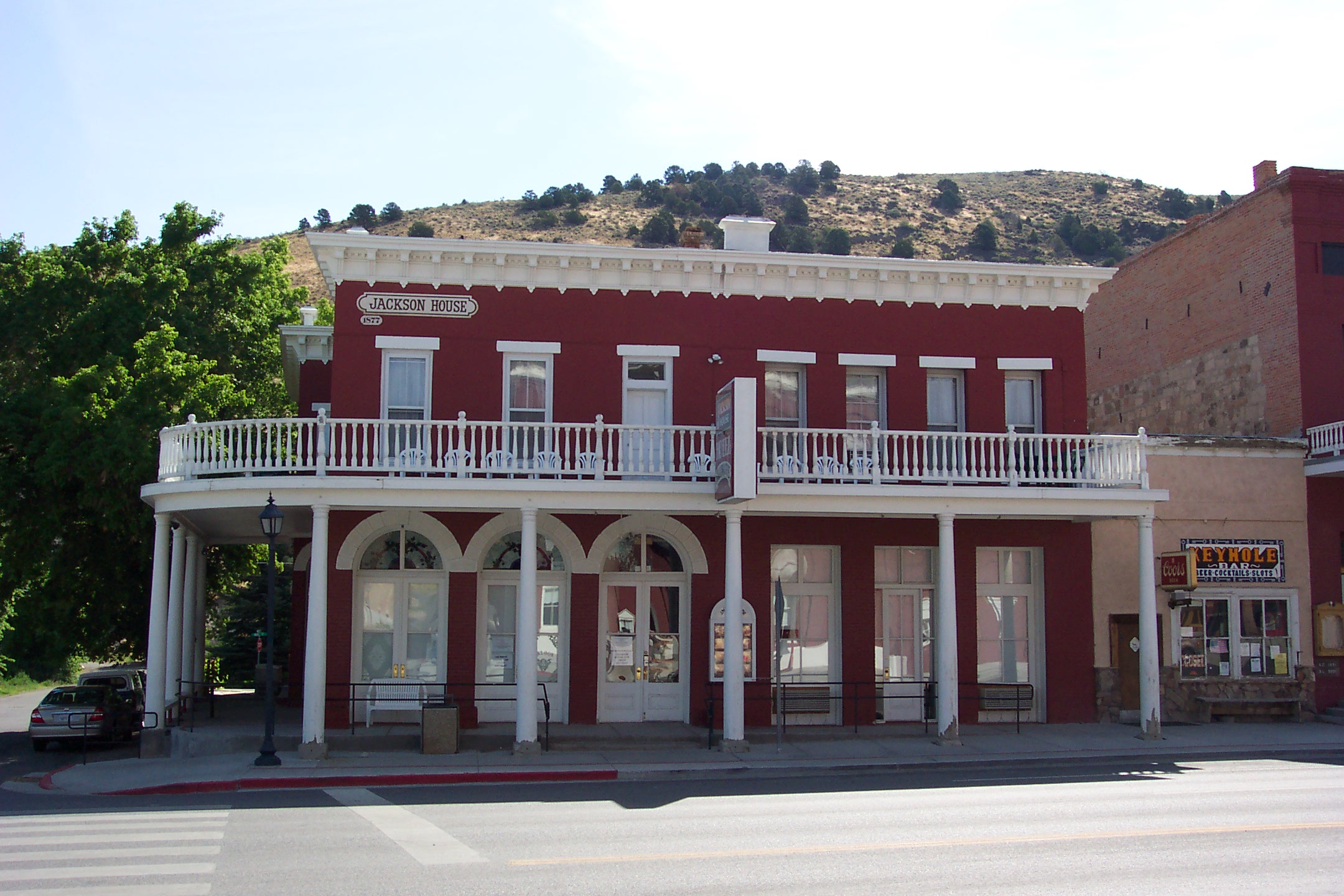
The historic Jackson House Hotel, built 1877

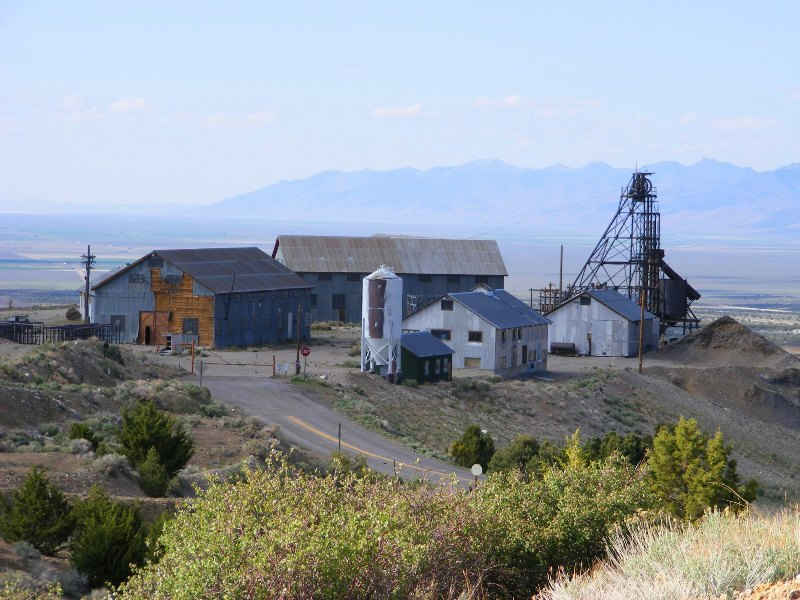
The historic Richmond Mine, one of the two major lead-silver mines in Eureka

The town was first settled in 1864 by a group of silver prospectors from nearby Austin, who discovered rock containing a silver-lead ore on nearby Prospect Peak. According to tradition, the town was named from an incident when a prospector exclaimed "Eureka!" when he discovered deposits of silver ore. The town became the county seat in 1873, when Eureka County was carved out of adjacent Lander, Elko, and White Pine counties.

The city rapidly grew throughout the 1870s. The Napias Post Office opened briefly in January 1870 and Eureka Post Office opened that same month. In July, the Eureka Sentinel began publication. By 1875, Eureka had become a major hub for stagecoaches to many other mining towns in rural, Northeastern Nevada. In 1878, the town's population had reached 9,000 (the second largest in Nevada at the time), and there were many casinos, saloons, and many other businesses. However, production began to slow in 1880, and the population significantly dropped. In the mines, water was discovered so expensive pumps were required to continue mining activities. Silver prices dropped in 1890 and the smelters for ores closed.

Mining, especially for lead, was the town's economic mainstay, as the nearby hillsides ranked as Nevada's second-richest mineral producer, behind western Nevada's Comstock Lode. Two of the largest concerns in Eureka were the Richmond Mining Company and the Eureka Mining Company. These two companies often collided, and in one instance, their litigation reached the U.S Supreme Court.

The town was serviced by the narrow gauge Eureka and Palisade Railroad from 1873 to 1938.

== Demographics ==
Historical population
Census	Pop.	Note	%±
2020	414		—
U.S. Decennial Census

== Geography and climate ==
Eureka is located in the southern part of Eureka County, at 6,481 feet (1,975 m) in the Diamond Mountains, in a draw on the southern end of Diamond Valley, between Antelope and Newark valleys. At the 2018 American Community Survey 5-Year Estimates, the population of the census-designated place of Eureka was 480, while the total population of Eureka and the surrounding area (Eureka CCD, Eureka County, Nevada) was 1,313.

The town is located along the Lincoln Highway / U.S. Route 50, nicknamed "The Loneliest Road in America": aptly named, as the nearest towns along the highway are Austin (70 mi or 110 km west) and Ely (77 mi or 124 km east). The nearest town is Duckwater, 46 mi (74 km) south.

Under the Köppen climate classification, Eureka has a cool semi-arid climate (BSk). The climate is typical of the Great Basin: hot and dry with cool mornings in the summer with occasional monsoonal thunderstorms from late July through August; cold and relatively dry in the winter. Temperatures drop to 0 °F or −17.8 °C or lower on an average 3.2 mornings during the winter, though in the severe winter of 1916/1917 this happened twenty-five times. They drop to 32 °F or 0 °C on an average 185.5 mornings, though maxima top freezing on all but 30.8 afternoons during an average year. During the summer temperatures rise to 90 °F or 32.2 °C or hotter on 12.5 afternoons, though 100 °F or 37.8 °C does not occur annually. However, the hottest temperature was 110 °F or 43.3 °C on July 22, 1904. Snow accumulations vary from 10 to 30 inches (0.25 to 0.76 m) in mild winters to in excess of 80 inches (2.0 m) in more severe years; in the winter of 1906/1907, more than 150 inches or 3.8 meters of snow fell.

The wettest calendar year has been 1941 with 23.86 inches (606.0 mm) and the driest 2020 with 4.18 inches (106.2 mm), whilst May 1917 with 5.73 inches (145.5 mm) has been the wettest single month. The snowiest month has been March 1902 with 54.0 inches or 1.4 meters of fresh snowfall.

Climate data for Eureka, Nevada, 1991–2020 normals, extremes 1888–present
Month	Jan	Feb	Mar	Apr	May	Jun	Jul	Aug	Sep	Oct	Nov	Dec	Year
Record high °F (°C)	65 (18)	65 (18)	82 (28)	87 (31)	95 (35)	100 (38)	110 (43)	105 (41)	109 (43)	100 (38)	81 (27)	66 (19)	110 (43)
Mean maximum °F (°C)	51.3 (10.7)	54.6 (12.6)	64.8 (18.2)	73.1 (22.8)	80.6 (27.0)	88.9 (31.6)	93.6 (34.2)	91.0 (32.8)	85.9 (29.9)	76.9 (24.9)	65.1 (18.4)	53.1 (11.7)	94.2 (34.6)
Mean daily maximum °F (°C)	37.6 (3.1)	40.2 (4.6)	48.4 (9.1)	54.9 (12.7)	64.7 (18.2)	76.7 (24.8)	85.6 (29.8)	84.1 (28.9)	74.7 (23.7)	61.7 (16.5)	47.7 (8.7)	37.3 (2.9)	59.5 (15.2)
Daily mean °F (°C)	27.8 (−2.3)	29.7 (−1.3)	36.4 (2.4)	41.7 (5.4)	50.6 (10.3)	60.6 (15.9)	69.4 (20.8)	68.2 (20.1)	59.4 (15.2)	47.5 (8.6)	36.0 (2.2)	27.3 (−2.6)	46.2 (7.9)
Mean daily minimum °F (°C)	18.0 (−7.8)	19.3 (−7.1)	24.3 (−4.3)	28.6 (−1.9)	36.4 (2.4)	44.4 (6.9)	53.2 (11.8)	52.3 (11.3)	44.1 (6.7)	33.3 (0.7)	24.3 (−4.3)	17.3 (−8.2)	33.0 (0.5)
Mean minimum °F (°C)	0.4 (−17.6)	3.3 (−15.9)	10.1 (−12.2)	16.7 (−8.5)	24.5 (−4.2)	32.0 (0.0)	43.8 (6.6)	42.6 (5.9)	31.4 (−0.3)	17.9 (−7.8)	6.8 (−14.0)	0.2 (−17.7)	−4.5 (−20.3)
Record low °F (°C)	−26 (−32)	−23 (−31)	−10 (−23)	5 (−15)	10 (−12)	11 (−12)	29 (−2)	30 (−1)	5 (−15)	0 (−18)	−10 (−23)	−21 (−29)	−26 (−32)
Average precipitation inches (mm)	0.85 (22)	1.28 (33)	1.34 (34)	1.36 (35)	1.18 (30)	0.49 (12)	0.46 (12)	0.64 (16)	0.78 (20)	0.83 (21)	0.79 (20)	0.86 (22)	10.86 (277)
Average snowfall inches (cm)	8.8 (22)	11.9 (30)	7.4 (19)	4.5 (11)	0.8 (2.0)	0.0 (0.0)	0.0 (0.0)	0.0 (0.0)	0.1 (0.25)	0.6 (1.5)	3.4 (8.6)	9.8 (25)	47.3 (119.35)
Average precipitation days (≥ 0.01 in)	5.9	5.9	5.8	6.4	5.4	2.3	2.7	3.1	3.1	3.5	4.6	6.4	55.1
Average snowy days (≥ 0.1 in)	2.8	2.4	1.7	1.4	0.5	0.0	0.0	0.0	0.1	0.3	1.5	3.3	14.0
Source 1: NOAA
Source 2: National Weather Service

== Public services ==
Eureka is served by an all-volunteer fire department, which provides fire protection, rescue, and vehicle rescue services for Eureka and the surrounding areas. In 2009 a new brick and steel fire house was built on Main Street in Eureka. At the time of its building it was the second largest fire house in the state. In addition to being a modern fire fighting facility, it contains a museum of Eureka fire department equipment and vehicles dating back to the 1870s. The fire-museum may be viewed through the large glass windows, or a tour may be taken by contacting a local fireman.

Eureka boasts three parks, a modern enclosed swimming facility, two baseball fields, a track, and football field.

The 1880s Eureka Opera House was re-modeled in recent times and regularly schedules performers.

The 1876 Eureka Court House is both historic and modern. It stands as the functioning governmental and legal center of Eureka County.

== Education ==
Eureka County School District is the local school district.

Eureka has a public library, a branch of the Elko-Lander-Eureka County Library System.

== Transportation ==
- Eureka Airport

== Notable people ==
- John Cradlebaugh, first delegate to the U.S. House of Representatives from Nevada Territory
- Warren J. Ferguson, who served on the United States Court of Appeals for the Ninth Circuit
- Antonio Mendez, CIA operative, who orchestrated the smuggling of six US hostages out of Iran.

== Gallery ==
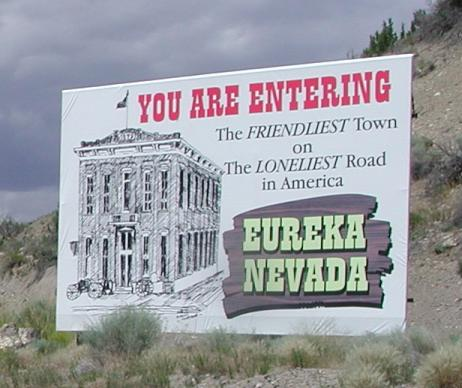
Welcome

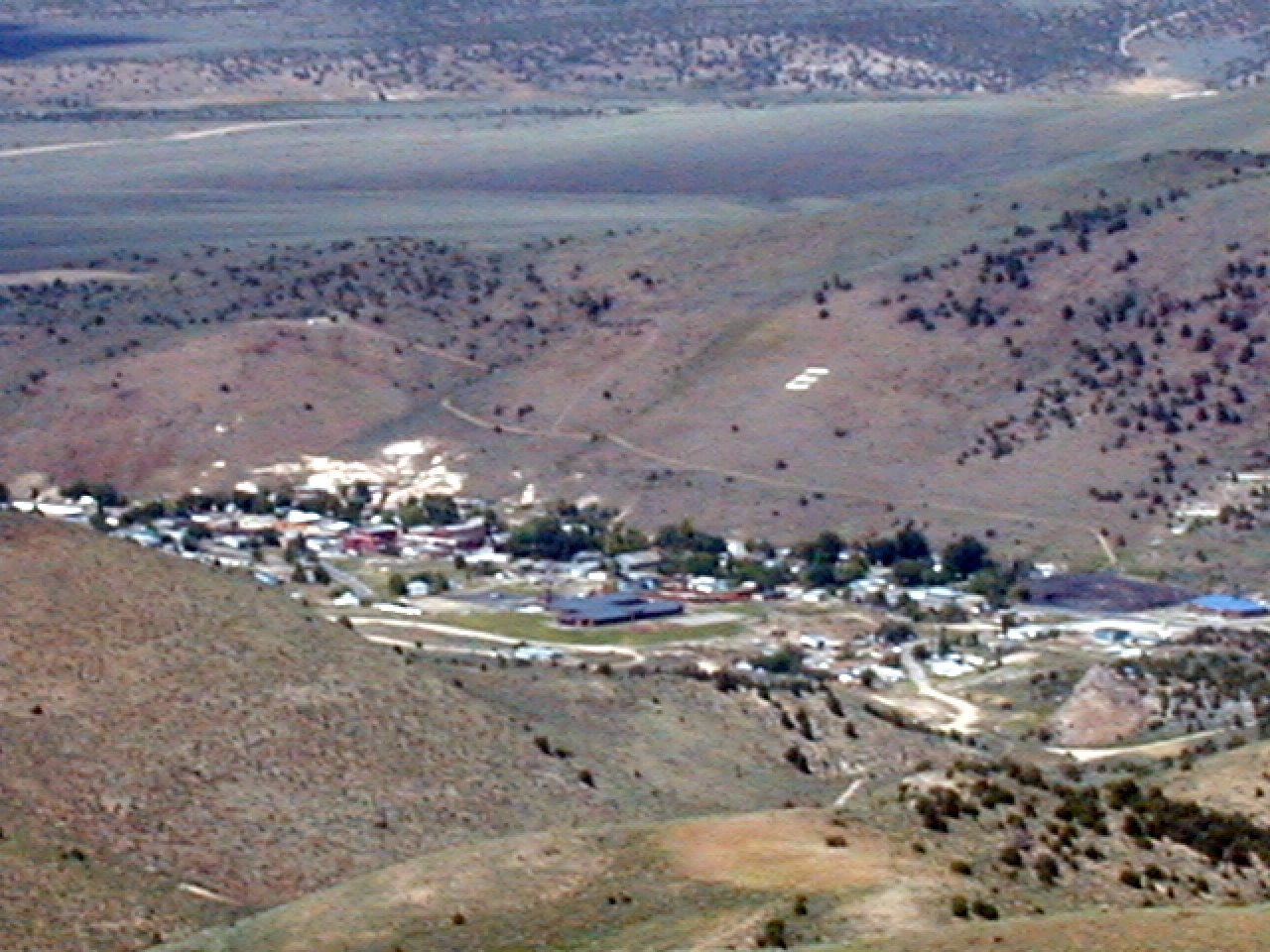
A view of Eureka

Parade 2006

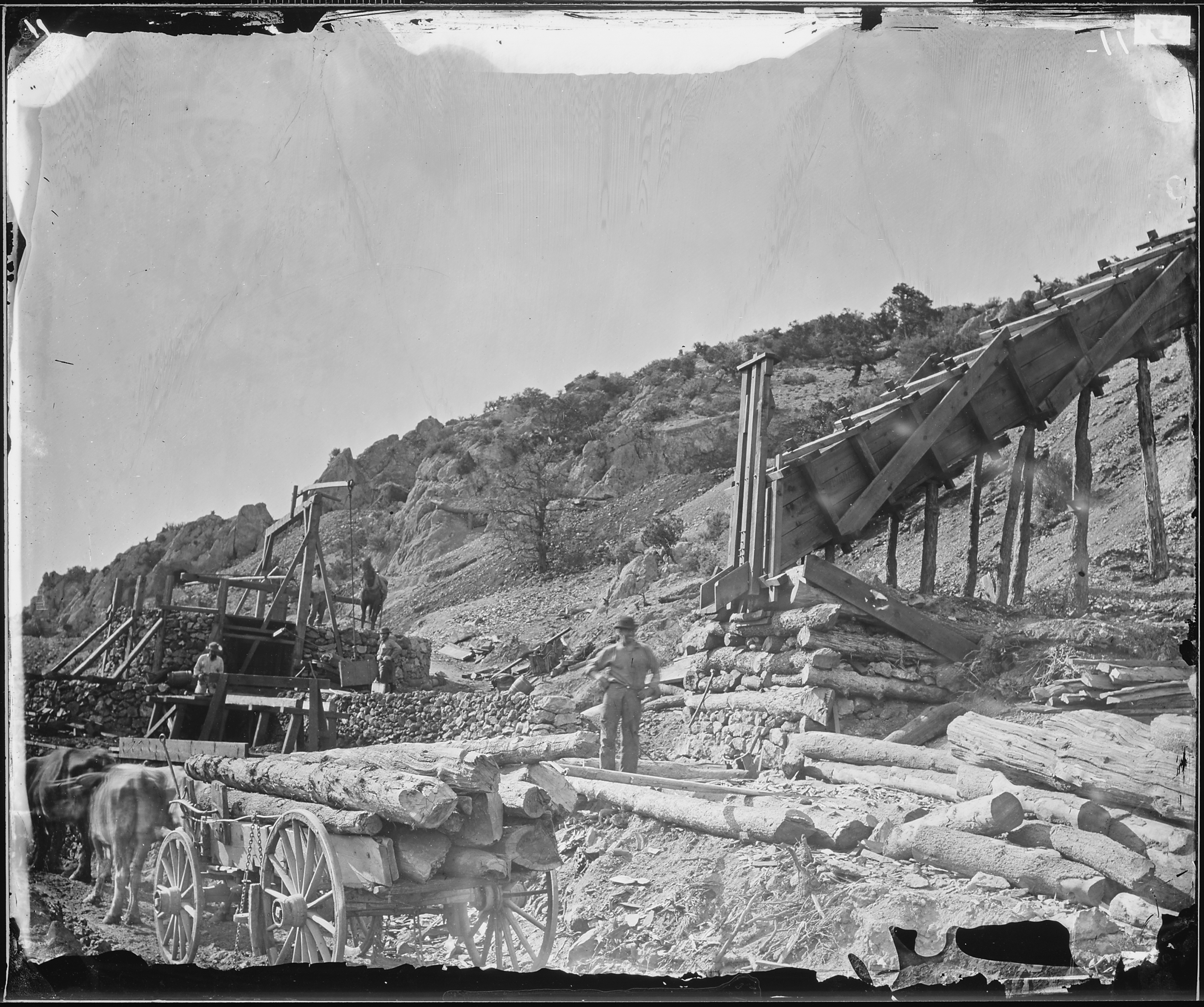
Ore chutes in 1871

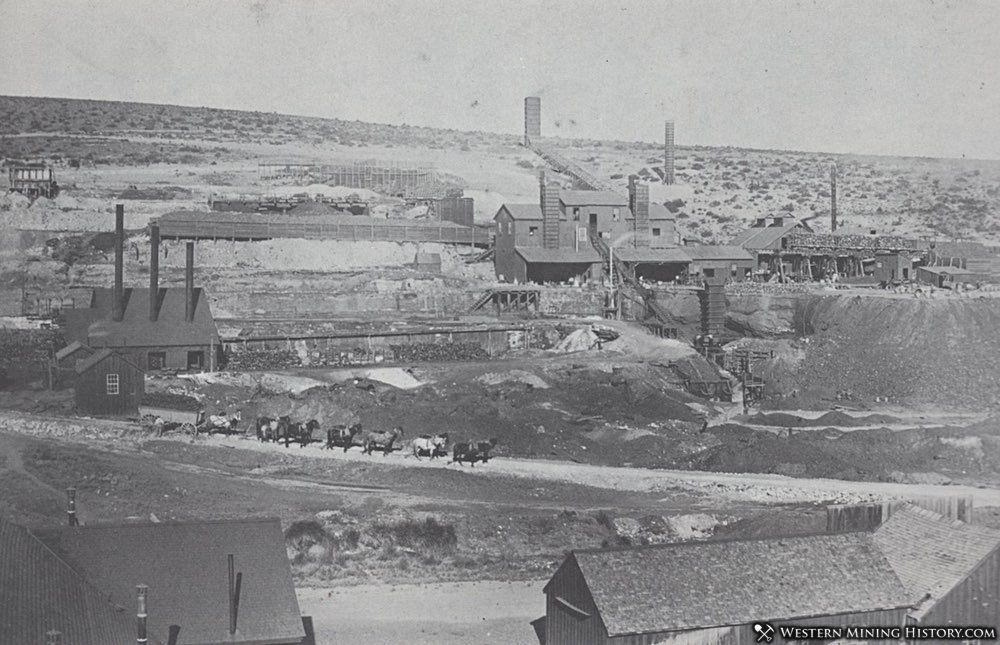
Eureka Consolidated smelter, ca. 1880

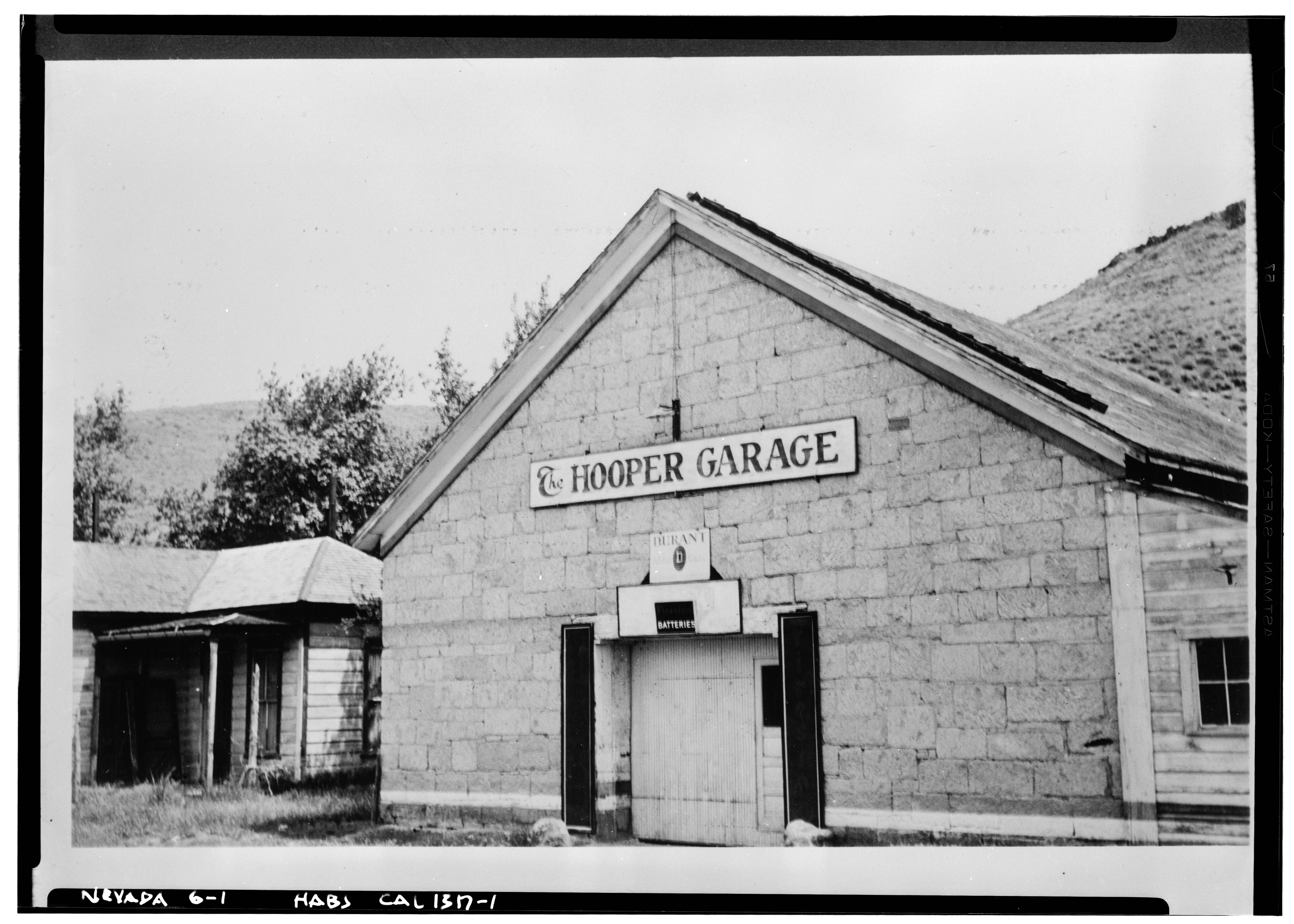
Old Hooper Garage in 1940

== See also ==
- List of census-designated places in Nevada
