= Elko Subdivision =

Railway line in Nevada

The Elko Subdivision is a railway line in Nevada owned and operated by the Union Pacific Railroad running from Weso (switching point just east of Winnemucca) to the freight yard in Elko. It is part of both the Overland Route and the Central Corridor. The line generally follows the Humboldt River and has several small tunnels while traversing the Palisade and Carlin Canyons, the longest tunnel is called the Carlin Tunnel.

== Description ==
The Elko subdivision is unique in that the entire subdivision is operated as a dual track main, but each of the two tracks in the main were formerly competing lines, built by different companies and at different times, that were combined with directional running. The westbound track was part of the first transcontinental railroad built in the 1860s by the Central Pacific Railroad, while the eastbound track was built by the Western Pacific Railroad as part of the Feather River Route, between 1906 and 1909. The two tracks generally follow each other, however, the routes are not identical. This results in several oddities in the Elko Subdivision. For example, the community of Battle Mountain is only accessible by westbound trains, as the Western Pacific built track used for eastbound trains is routed several miles to the north of Battle Mountain. The North Valmy Generating Station resides between the two tracks, and the feeders from each track can be used as a crossover for trains to turn around. Also unique, the two tracks have a grade separated crossover near Palisade. As a result, trains in the eastern half of the Elko Subdivision observe right hand traffic, while trains in the western half observe left hand traffic. This shared track arrangement continues east of the Elko freight yards, where the line becomes the Shafter Subdivision until Alazon, Nevada (near Wells). At Alazon, the two lines separate, with the Central Corridor proceeding to Salt Lake City, while the Overland Route proceeds to Ogden, Utah.

== History ==
The 1939 City of San Francisco derailment occurred along today's Elko Subdivision, near a rail siding called Harney, between Beowawe and Palisade.

In the 1980s both tracks were relocated out of downtown Elko along the banks of the Humboldt River, resulting in Elko having two historical train depots downtown, with neither connected to track today. The Southern Pacific Railroad depot (for westbound passengers) was at 683 Railroad Street, while the Western Pacific (eastbound) depot was at the corner of 3rd and Silver streets.
