= Carlin Tunnel =

Road and rail tunnels in Nevada, U.S.

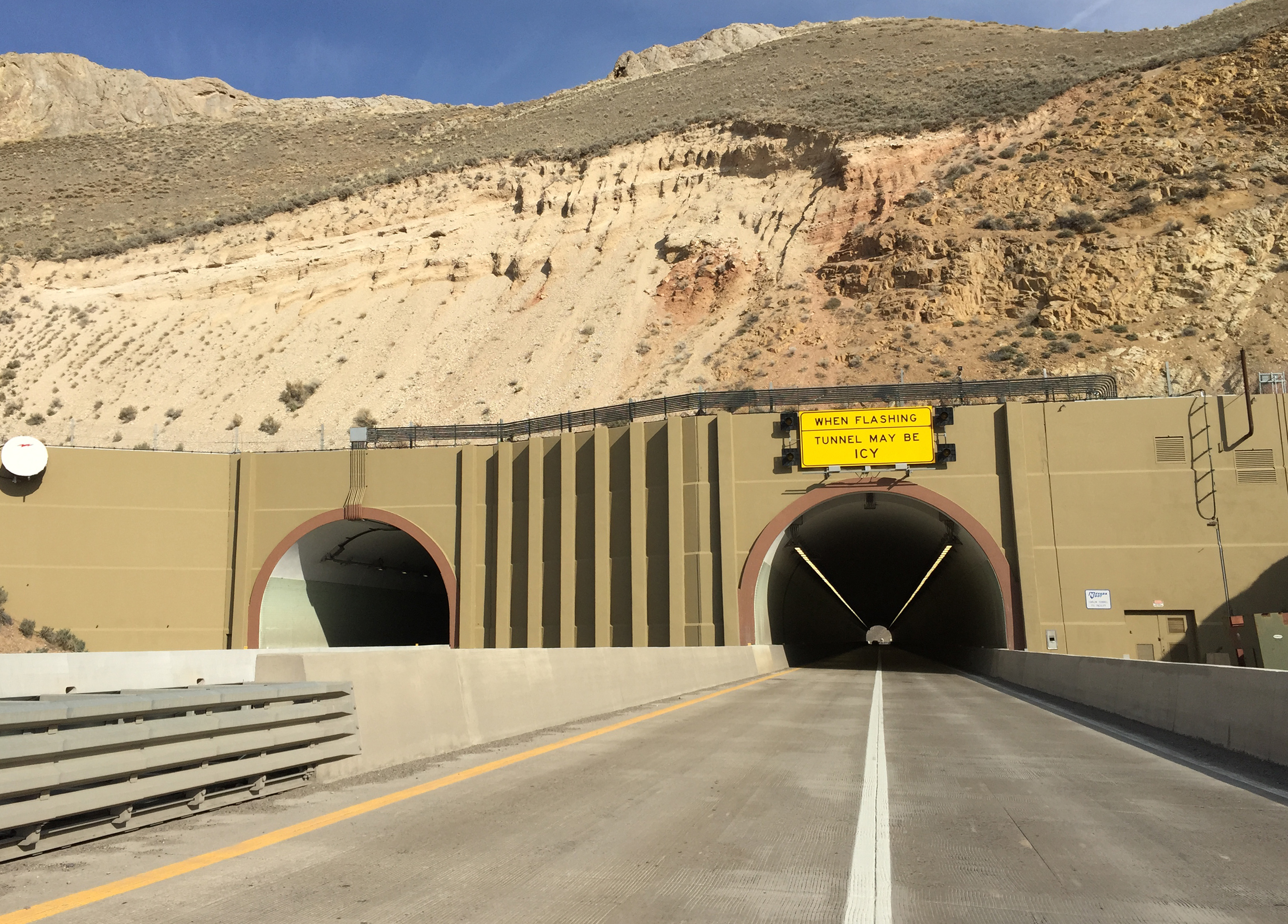
- View east along Interstate 80 approaching the Carlin Tunnel
- Interactive map of Carlin Tunnel

Overview
- Location: Near Carlin, Nevada
- Coordinates: 40.721665°N 116.01408°W
- Route: I-80

Operation
- Opened: September 25, 1975
- Operator: Nevada Department of Transportation
- Traffic: Automotive
- Character: Interstate Highway system (two bores)
- Vehicles per day: 10000

Technical
- Length: 0.3 miles (0.48 km)
- No. of lanes: 4 lanes in 2 tubes
- Max elevation: 4,950 feet (1,510 m)

Carlin Tunnel
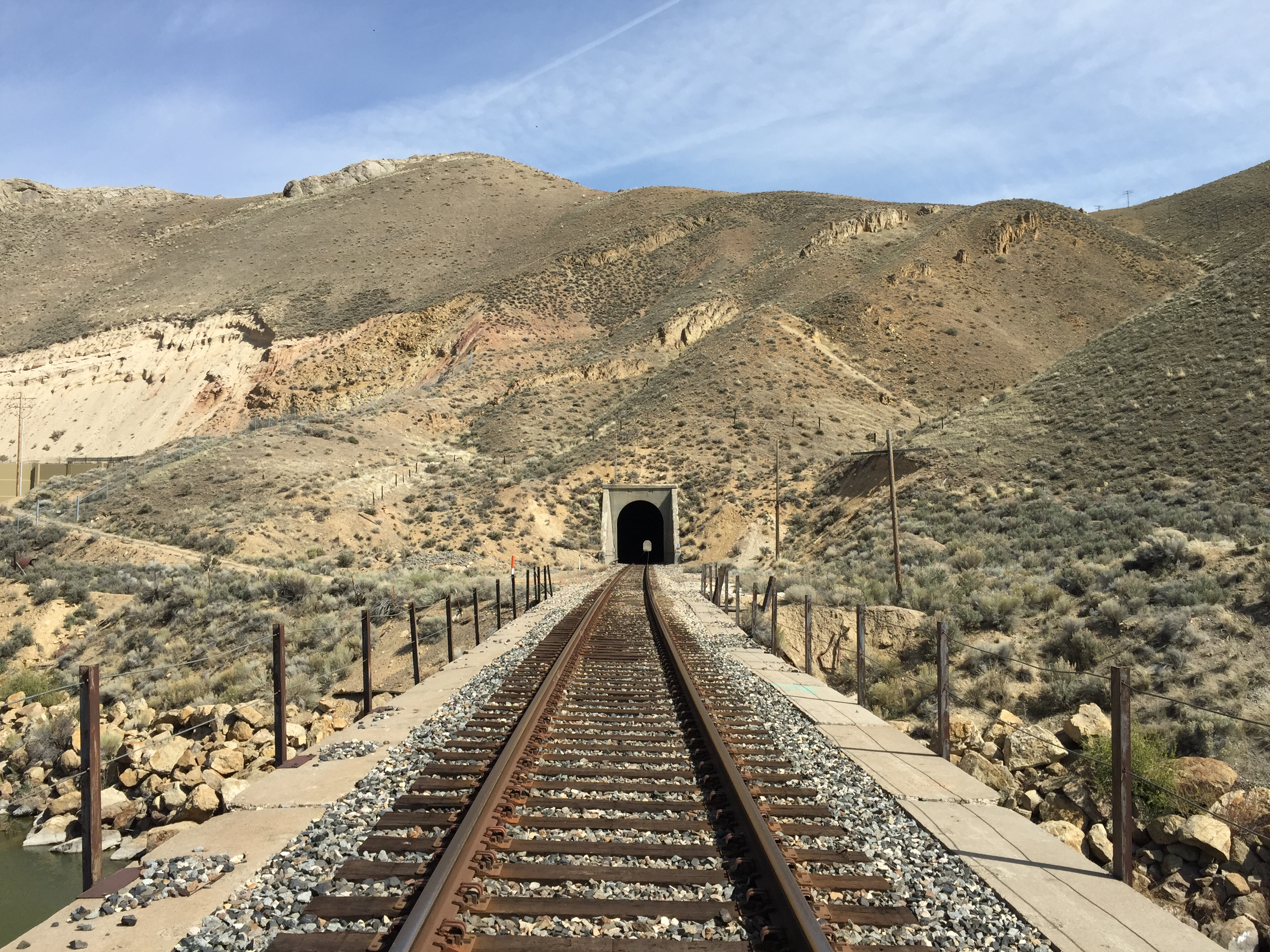
- Western portal of the northern rail line through the Carlin Tunnel
- Interactive map of Carlin Tunnel

Overview
- Line: Elko Subdivision
- Location: Near Carlin, Nevada at Tonka rail siding

Operation
- Opened: 1903 (original railroad bore)
- Operator: Union Pacific Railroad
- Traffic: Rail
- Character: Passenger and freight rail (two bores)

Technical
- Length: 1,887 ft (575 m) (SP bore); 2,342 ft (714 m) (WP bore)
- No. of tracks: double track
- Track gauge: 1,435 mm (4 ft 8 1/2 in) standard gauge

The Carlin Tunnel is a collective name for a set of four tunnel bores in the Humboldt River's Carlin Canyon, east of Carlin in Elko County, Nevada, United States. The two railroad bores were constructed for different purposes at different times, while the two highway bores were constructed concurrently, all with the goal of bypassing a sharp bend in the river. Currently, two of the bores carry Interstate 80, while the other two bores carry Union Pacific Railroad's Overland Route and Central Corridor. Bridges over the Humboldt River are adjacent to both portals of three tubes, including the two freeway bores and one of the railroad bores.

== History ==
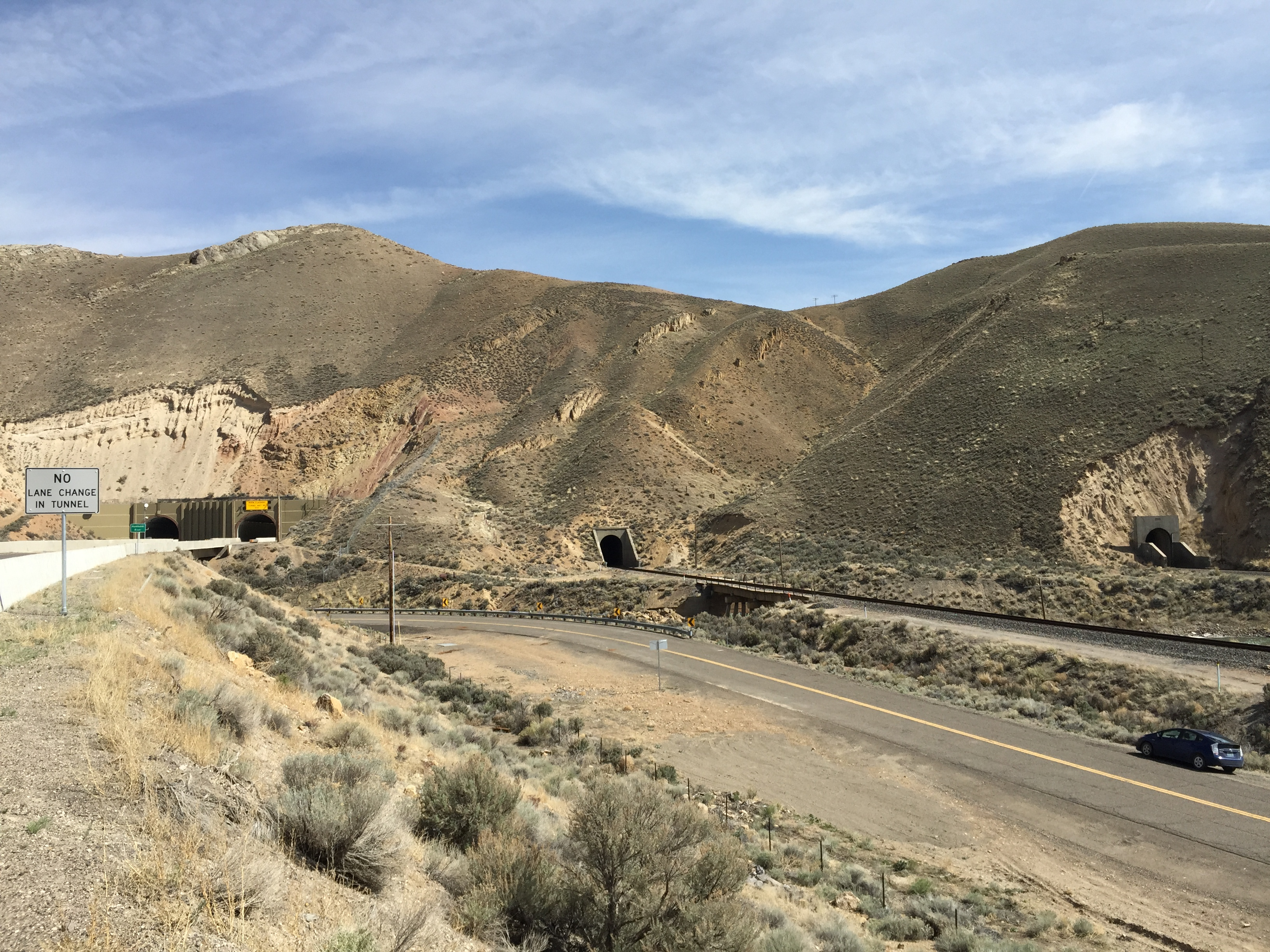
The four western portals to the Carlin Tunnel; the two Interstate 80 bores are on the left and the two railroad bores on the right.

The first bore was constructed by the Southern Pacific Railroad in 1903 as part of a straightening of the First transcontinental railroad, prior to this time the railroad followed the curved river through the canyon. The second tunnel was constructed by the Western Pacific Railroad for the Feather River Route. The modern Union Pacific Railroad, which acquired both of these railroad companies, has combined the former competing lines into a dual-track directional running main for uninterrupted traffic, now known as the Elko Subdivision. The former Southern Pacific bore crosses the Humboldt river at each portal, similar to the freeway bores, while the former Western Pacific bore does not cross the river at the tunnel portals. U.S. Route 40 was originally routed on the old railroad grade through the canyon. With the planned construction of Interstate 80 through the area, a third and fourth bore was constructed to accommodate the expected traffic increase and higher traffic speed; these were completed and opened on September 25, 1975. The estimated cost to build the tunnels was US$8 million (equivalent to $39,474,600 in 2024); at the time this was the most expensive single construction contract awarded by the Nevada Department of Highways, predecessor agency to the Nevada Department of Transportation. Completion was originally scheduled for late 1974, however during boring fragmented rock was discovered which slowed progress.

In addition to these larger tunnels, both railroad grades feature several smaller tunnels as the railroad follows Carlin Canyon and downstream Palisade canyon of the Humboldt River. The railroad bridges and tunnels near Carlin have made news on a few occasions. In 1908, a rock slide nearly caused the Southern Pacific tunnel to collapse resulting in a massive effort to save the rail line. In 1939, the City of San Francisco passenger train derailed on one of the Humboldt river bridges, killing 24 and injuring 121. The incident was ruled sabotage, but remains unsolved. In 2008, a train derailment at a smaller tunnel west of Carlin led to the collapse of one of the Humboldt River bridges. This bridge collapse resulted in nationwide rail traffic delays.

The Interstate 80 tunnels were renovated 2012–2014.
