= 1939 City of San Francisco derailment =

Railway accident caused by sabotage

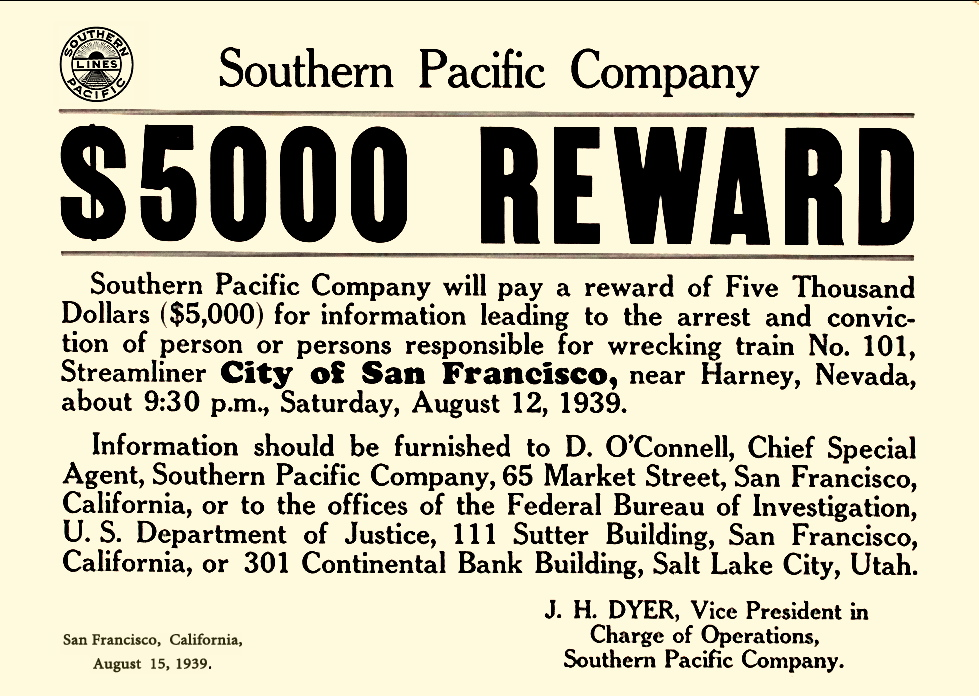
- Wanted poster placed by the Southern Pacific Railroad pleading for information

Details
- Date: August 12, 1939; 87 years ago 9:33 p.m.
- Location: Harney, Nevada
- Coordinates: 40.5755261°N 116.2981592°W
- Country: United States
- Operator: Southern Pacific Railroad (SP)
- Incident type: Derailment
- Cause: Sabotage

Statistics
- Trains: City of San Francisco
- Deaths: 24
- Injured: 121

On August 12, 1939, the City of San Francisco train derailed outside of Harney, Nevada, United States, killing 24 and injuring 121 passengers and crew. The derailment was caused by sabotage of the tracks. Despite a manhunt, reward offers, and years of investigation by the Southern Pacific Railroad (SP), the case remains unsolved.

== Background ==
The City of San Francisco was a cross-country passenger train running from Oakland, California to Chicago, Illinois. The train was jointly operated by three railroad companies, and the Nevada portion was operated by the Southern Pacific Railroad (SP). The incident happened approximately 1.5 miles (2.4 km) east of Harney, a named rail siding along the SP main line as it follows the Humboldt River through Palisade Canyon, between the towns of Beowawe and Palisade. The train derailed at a high embankment next to a bridge over the river along a curve in the canyon. Sometime later, the Humboldt River was re-channeled and the tracks adjusted at this curve. There is no bridge at the location of the derailment today.

== Incident ==
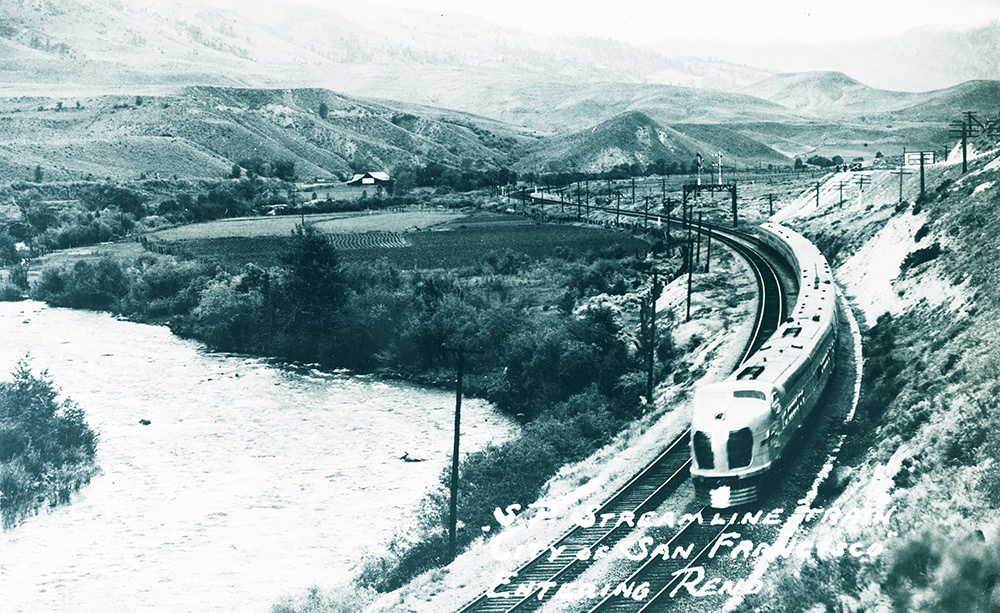
A train similar to the one that crashed

The City of San Francisco was travelling westbound for Oakland but was running behind schedule by around half an hour. After leaving Carlin, Nevada, engineer Ed Hecox had increased the speed to 90 miles per hour (140 km/h) to make up time. At 9:33 p.m., Hecox and his train hit a patch of rail that had been deliberately moved out of alignment and camouflaged with brown paint and tumbleweed, derailing the train while it crossed the #4 bridge in the Humboldt River Gorge. Hecox survived and ran to the telephone at Harney to contact emergency services. Volunteers from Beowawe and Carlin rushed to the scene with medical supplies, but survivors were not taken to the hospital until a rescue train was assembled and took them to Elko the next morning.

Five cars were destroyed and written off: SF 601 Presidio (32-seat coffee shop–kitchen car), SF-602 Mission Dolores (72-seat diner), SF-701 Embarcadero (dormitory-buffet-lounge car), and two sleepers, Twin Peaks and Chinatown. The SP tracks were out of service for several months, but the nearby tracks of competing Western Pacific Railroad were intact and used for both rescue trains and regular service until the SP tracks were repaired. A total of 24 people died and 121 were injured.

== Investigation ==
In the following days, divers discovered tools in the Humboldt River, exposing the disaster as an act of sabotage. Investigators estimated it would take a strong person about an hour to move the tracks, and noted the previous train passed through the area four hours before; SP's lead investigator, Dan O’Connell, estimated several hours, and a reenactment for the San Francisco Chronicle the year of the derailment required four heavy tools. SP established a $5,000 bounty (equivalent to $116,000 in 2025) for the saboteurs (eventually increased to $10,000), and numerous lone hobos were arrested, although some investigators argued the sabotage was likely carried out by two or more people with knowledge of railroad operations. The arrests and interrogations led nowhere.

The media coverage during the investigation proved hostile to SP. One of the first newspaper reporters on the scene was a photographer for the Elko Daily Free Press, who took pictures of the wreck site. SP accused the paper of publishing pictures taken at angles that made the damage appear worse than it actually was, to which the photographer responded, "God knows, it would have been impossible to make it look worse than it was". The railroad was criticized for the amounts paid in compensation. In one case where a passenger originally bought a ticket on a coach fare train, but before boarding upgraded to the City of San Francisco, a premium fare train, SP only refunded the difference between the two tickets. Other papers promoted a theory that the sabotage story was a coverup to hide SP's negligence in allowing Hecox to operate the train at such high speed. These papers interviewed and noted that some passengers were uncomfortable with the speed of the train several minutes before it derailed. As the train rounded curves passengers had difficulty standing and some beer bottles were shaken off of tables. Despite these details, the official position of both SP and the Federal Bureau of Investigation remains unchanged that the train was sabotaged, noting the evidence the rails were moved and the track circuits were bypassed.

The case received new attention after the 1995 derailment in Palo Verde, Arizona. One week before the Arizona derailment, the Southern Pacific Historical and Technical Society published an article about the Nevada derailment in their magazine. In addition to both accidents occurring along SP track, investigators noticed other similarities with the Nevada derailment, namely tracks moved on a bridge with a high embankment and bypassed track circuits so the signaling systems would not warn of a track break. These similarities and the timing of the magazine article initially led to suspicion the Arizona wreck may have been a copycat crime of the Nevada derailment. While the FBI interviewed people involved in the publication of the magazine article, no connection between the two crimes was established, and both crimes remain unsolved.

To this day, the wreck of the City of San Francisco remains unsolved, and remains the deadliest rail disaster in Nevada.

== See also ==
- List of unsolved murders (1900–1979)
