= Tuscarora, Nevada =

Unincorporated community in Nevada, US

- Unincorporated community
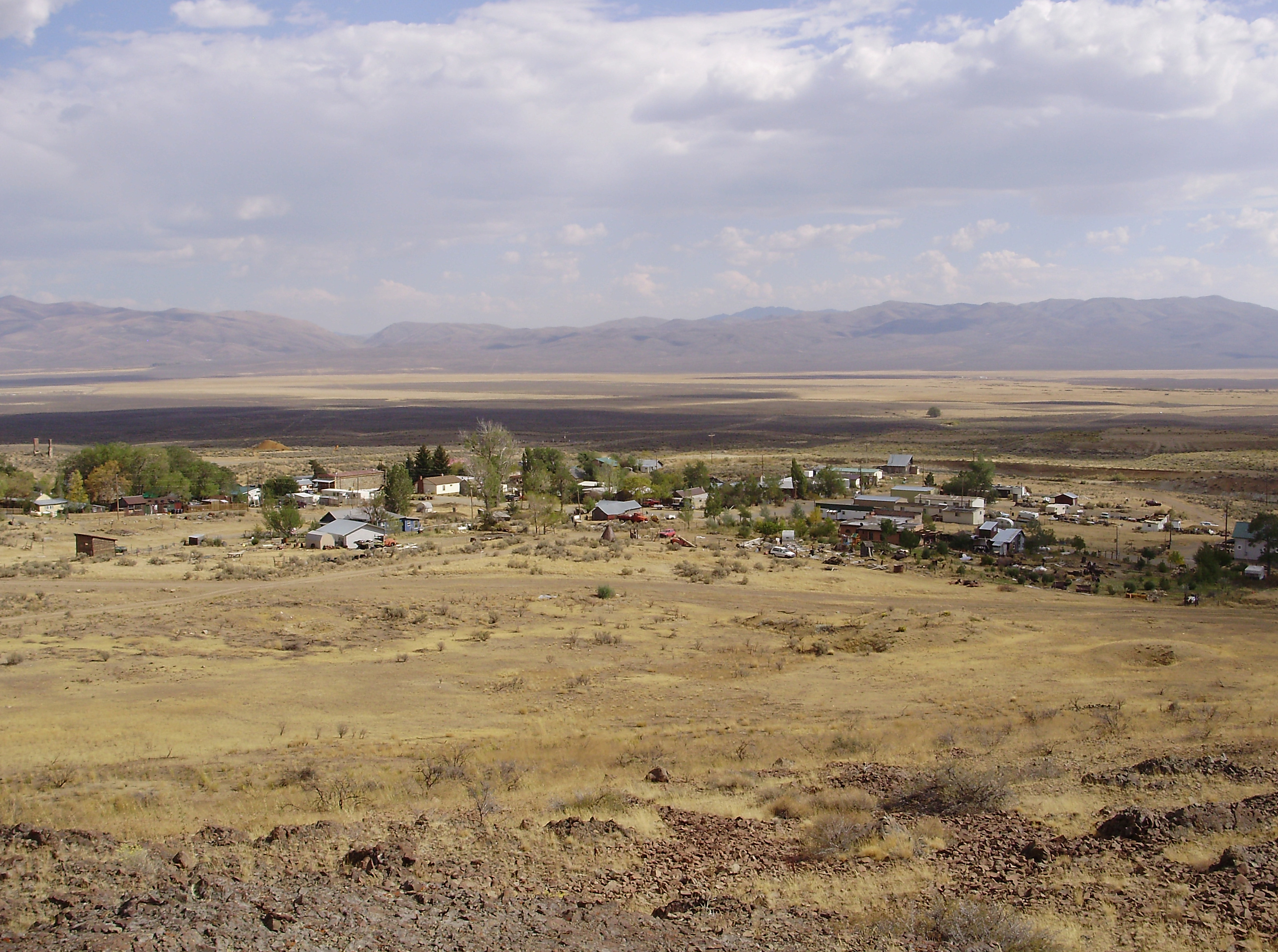
- Tuscarora, September 2012

- Location within the state of Nevada Tuscarora (the United States)
- Coordinates: 41°18′51″N 116°13′18″W
- Country: United States
- State: Nevada
- County: Elko
- Time zone: UTC-8 (Pacific (PST))
  - Summer (DST): UTC-7 (PDT)
- ZIP code: 89834
- Area code: 775
- GNIS feature ID: 844463

Nevada Historical Marker
- Reference no.: 48

Tuscarora (Shoshoni language: Tosa Konoki) is an unincorporated community in Elko County, Nevada, United States. The community lies on the east side of the Tuscarora Mountains, approximately 40 miles north of Carlin and 50 miles from Elko. Tuscarora is part of the Elko Micropolitan Statistical Area.

== History ==
Tuscarora was founded in Elko County, after an expedition by trader William Heath to find gold, in 1867. The community derives its name from the Tuscarora people. As miners flocked to the town, a fort was built to offer protection from Indian raids and a water ditch was created to supply the town with water. Many Chinese men who had been employed by the Central Pacific Railroad (CPR) relocated to the town and began placer mining. By 1870, Tuscarora had a population of 119, of whom 104 were Chinese. A post office was established at Tuscarora in 1871. A boom began following the discovery of silver ore. In 1879, the population of Tuscarora reached 1,500, making it one of the larger settlements in Nevada.

A second mining boom occurred between 1883 and 1887, racking up an equally high amount of silver as it did during its first boom as a result of several newly built mines in the 1870s. However, the silver production generated in the mines established during this mining boom period did not yield the same amount of production as they had previously, and mining companies in Tuscarora started entering into a decline period, with several mines, such as the Young America mine, closing down in the early 1890s.

Despite this, several mining companies continued operating, and at one point, gold production was higher than silver during the late 1890s and early 1900s. In 1987, exploration for microscopic gold mining was initiated, resulting in Horizon Gold establishing a permanent mine for silver and gold extraction in 1989, which lasted until 1991.

== Education ==
Tuscarora is home to two small schools provided by the Elko County School District.

Tuscarora has a public library, a branch of the Elko-Lander-Eureka County Library System.

== Notable people ==
- Wheezer Dell, He was the first Nevada-born player in Major League Baseball History.
