= Tuscarora Mountains =

Mountain range in Nevada, United States

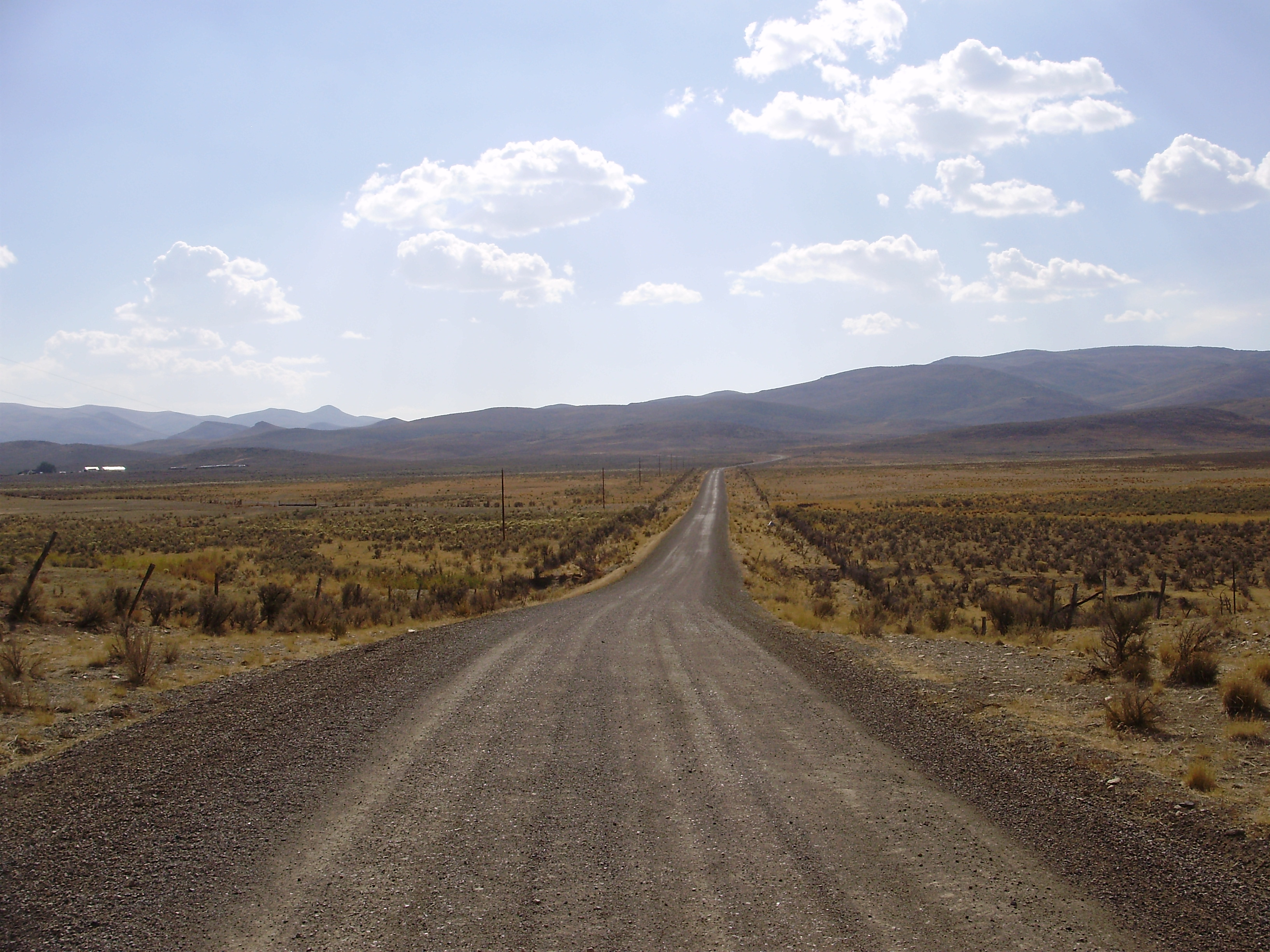
- View of the Tuscarora Mountains from Midas-Tuscarora Road near Tuscarora, Nevada.

Highest point
- Elevation: 2,340 m (7,680 ft)

Geography
- Location within Nevada
- Country: United States
- State: Nevada
- District: Elko County
- Range coordinates: 41°20′38″N 116°14′48″W
- Topo map: USGS Sugarloaf Butte

The Tuscarora Mountains are a mountain range in Elko and Eureka counties of northern, Nevada. The southern perimeter of the north–south mountain range is the Humboldt River and valley. The community of Tuscarora lies on the east flank of the range.

The range is named after the Tuscarora people.
