= Humboldt River =

River drainage system in north-central Nevada, United States

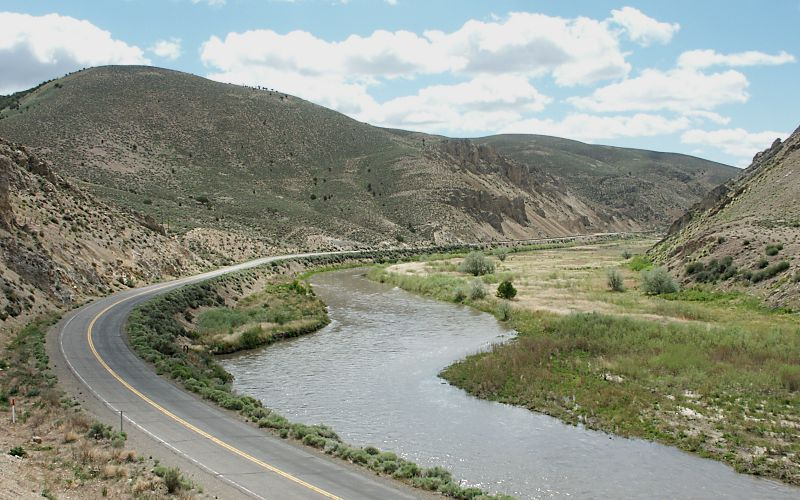
- The Humboldt River, flowing through Carlin Canyon

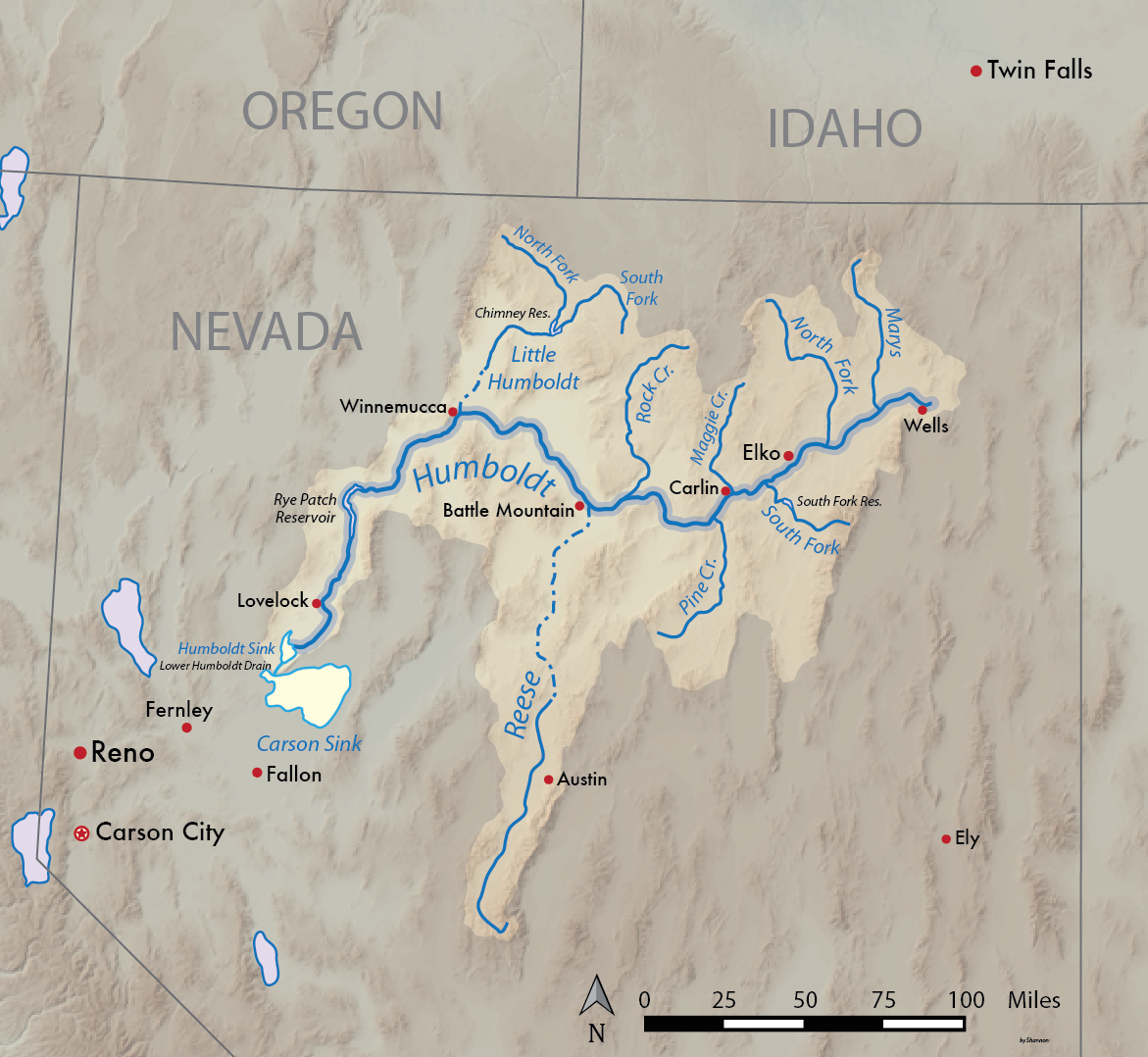
- Map of the Humboldt River watershed
- Etymology: Alexander von Humboldt

Location
- Country: United States
- State: Nevada

Physical characteristics
- Source: Humboldt Wells
  - location: East Humboldt Range, Elko County, Nevada
  - coordinates: 41°7′13″N 114°58′5″W
  - elevation: 5,620 ft (1,710 m)
- Mouth: Humboldt Sink
  - location: Churchill County, Nevada
  - coordinates: 39°59′17″N 118°36′4″W
  - elevation: 3,894 ft (1,187 m)
- Length: 290 mi (470 km)
- Basin size: 16,680 sq mi (43,200 km^{2})
- Discharge
  - average: 390 cu ft/s (11 m^{3}/s)
  - minimum: 0 cu ft/s (0 m^{3}/s)
  - maximum: 17,000 cu ft/s (480 m^{3}/s)

Nevada Historical Marker
- Reference no.: 22

The Humboldt River is the longest river in the northern and central part of Nevada. It extends in a general east-to-west direction from its headwaters in northern Nevada's Jarbidge, Independence, and Ruby Mountains in Elko County to its terminus in the Humboldt Sink, approximately 225 miles (362 km) away in northwest Churchill County.

Most estimates put the Humboldt River at 300 to 330 miles (480 to 530 km) long; however, due to the extensive meandering nature of the river, its length may be more closely estimated at 380 miles (610 km).

The Humboldt is the third-longest river within the Great Basin watershed, behind the Bear River at 355 miles (571 km) and the Sevier River at 325 miles (523 km). The Humboldt River Basin is the largest sub-basin of the Great Basin, encompassing an area of 16,840 square miles (43,600 km^{2}). It is the only major river system wholly contained within the state of Nevada.

It is the only natural transportation artery across the Great Basin and has historically provided a route for westward migration. Additionally, a major railroad mainline loosely follows its path. Interstate 80 follows the river's course from its source to its mouth.

The river was named by John C. Frémont for the German naturalist Alexander von Humboldt.

== History ==
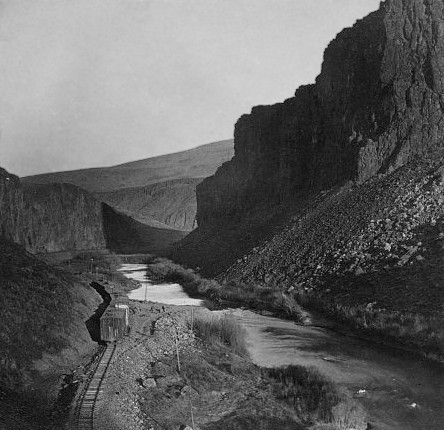
Palisade Canyon and the Humboldt River in 1868 during the construction of the First transcontinental railroad.

The northern Nevada region where the river flows was sparsely inhabited by Numic-speaking people at the time of the arrival of European American settlers. The region was little known by non-indigenous peoples until the arrival of fur trappers in the early 19th century.

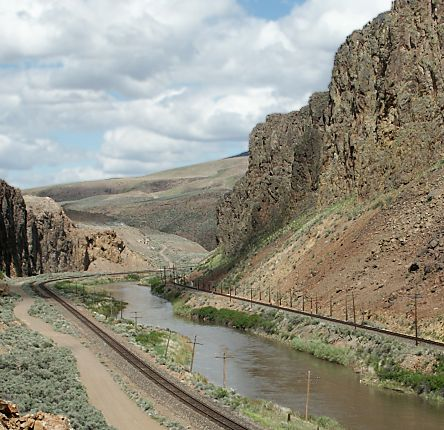
Palisade Canyon and the Humboldt River in 2008, 140 years after the picture above.

The first recorded sighting of the river was on November 9, 1828, by Peter Skene Ogden of the Hudson's Bay Company during his fifth expedition to the Snake Country. Odgen came southward along the Little Humboldt, encountering the main river at the confluence near Winnemucca. Ogden explored the river for several hundred miles, blazing a trail along it and making the first known map of the region. He initially named the river "Unknown River," due to the source and course of the river still unknown to him, and later "Paul's River," after one of his trappers who died on the expedition and was buried on the river bank. He later changed it again to "Mary's River," named after the Native American wife of one of his trappers, which later somehow became "St. Mary's River." However, in 1829 he suggested that "Swampy River" best described the course he had traversed. In 1833 the Bonneville–Walker fur party explored the river, naming it "Barren River." Washington Irving's 1837 book describing the Bonneville expedition called it "Ogden's River," the name used by many early travelers. By the early 1840s, the trail along the river was being used by settlers going west to California. The river provided drinkable water to earlier travelers on foot, but later emigrants using wagons required the significant riparian vegetation along its length as forage for their draft animals.

In 1841, the river (then known as Mary's River) first became the route of the California Trail with the Bartleson–Bidwell Party, later becoming the primary land route for migrants to the California gold fields. In 1845 the river was explored by John C. Frémont, who made a thorough map of the region and gave the river its current name. In 1869 the river was used as part of the route of the Central Pacific segment of the Transcontinental Railroad. In the 20th century, the valley of the river became the route for U.S. Route 40, later replaced by Interstate 80. In the latter part of the 20th century, about 45,000 people lived within 10 miles (16 km) of the river, roughly a third of Nevada's population outside of Western and Southern Nevada prior to the rapid population growth in Clark County.

== Watershed and course ==
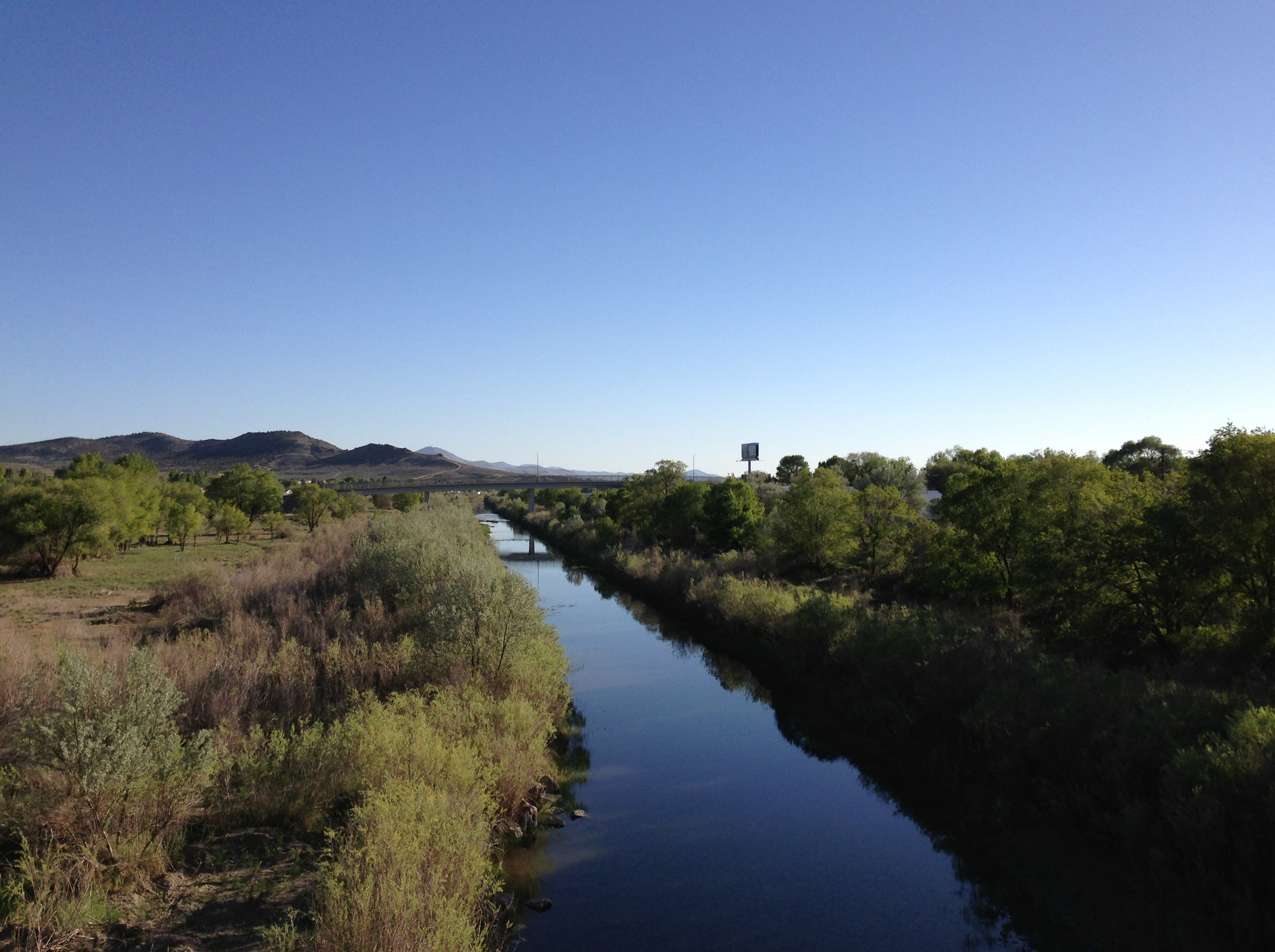
View southwest from the footbridge in Elko, the largest city along the Humboldt

The Humboldt River can be divided geographically into the upper, middle, and lower divisions based on Palisade Canyon and Emigrant Canyon being the major constriction points along the Humboldt River Valley. The upper basin begins in northeastern Nevada and drains about 5,000 square miles (13,000 km^{2}) upstream from Palisade. The middle basin has a drainage area of about 7,800 square miles (20,000 km^{2}) and lies between Palisade and Emigrant Canyons, a narrow gap located just downstream from Comus. The lower basin is an area encompassing some 4,100 square miles (11,000 km^{2}) from below Emigrant Canyon and extending through the Humboldt Sink in northwestern Nevada.

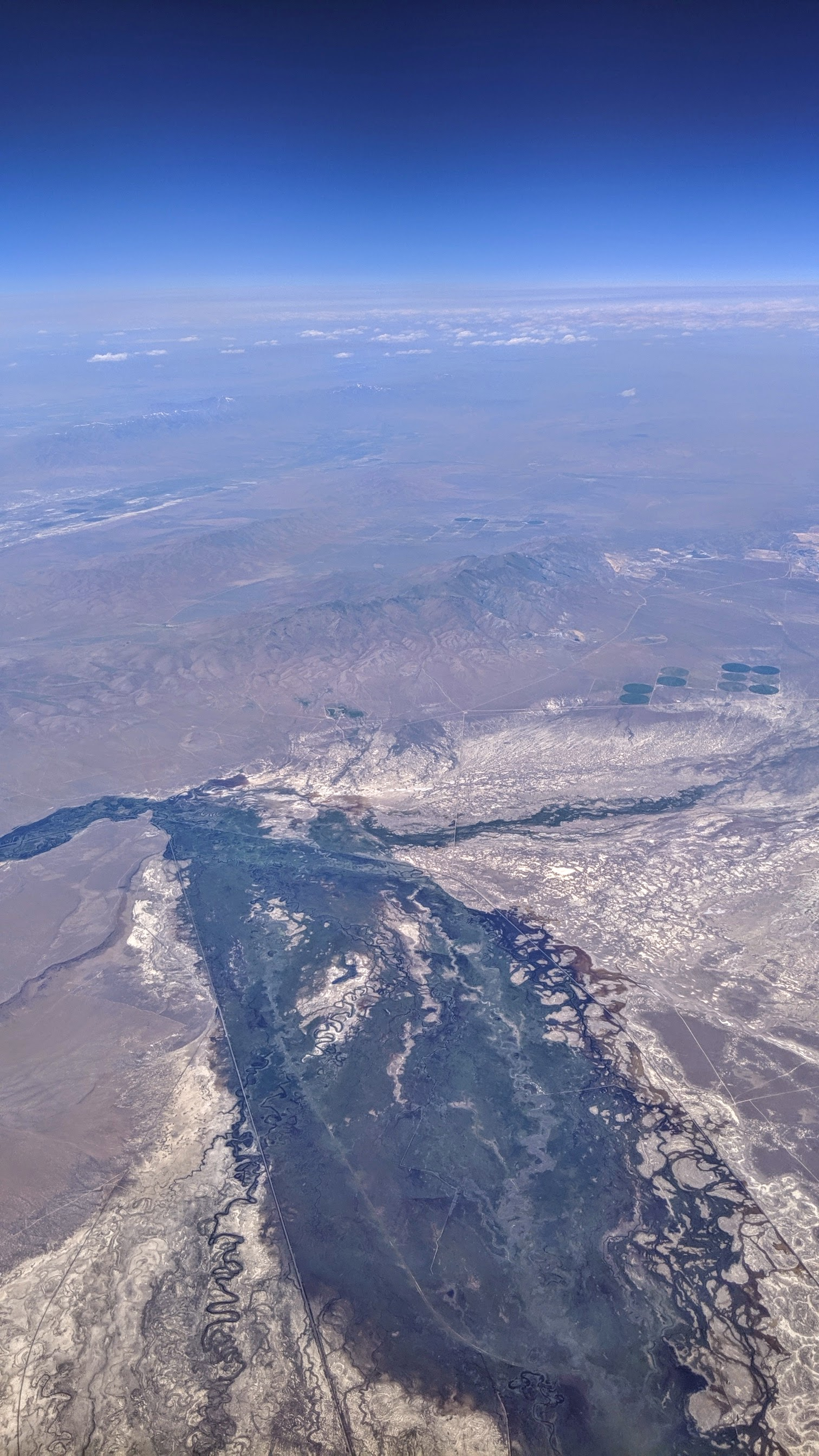
Aerial view of the Humboldt River's intermittent wetlands at Red House, Nevada, between Battle Mountain and Winnemucca in Humboldt County, in June 2019, a wet year

A hydrologic definition instead divides the Humboldt River drainage into two basins—one above and one below Palisade—based on flows that increase above and decrease below this part of the river. The river in the upper basin is 92 miles (148 km) long, and in the lower basin it is 218 miles (351 km) long. The major tributaries of the upper Humboldt River basin are (heading downstream) Bishop Creek, Marys River, Lamoille Creek, North Fork Humboldt River, South Fork Humboldt River, Susie Creek, Maggie Creek, and Marys Creek; of the lower basin they are Pine Creek, Reese River, and the Little Humboldt River.

The source of the main stem of the river is a spring called Humboldt Wells at the northern tip of the East Humboldt Range, just outside the city of Wells. The river flows west-southwest through Elko County, past the communities of Elko and Carlin. Approximately 15 miles (24 km) upstream from Elko, the river receives the North Fork of the Humboldt River and receives the South Fork approximately 7 miles (11 km) downstream of Elko.

In northern Eureka County, it passes through Palisade Canyon between the southern end of the Tuscarora Mountains and the north end of the Shoshone Range. At Battle Mountain, the river turns northwest for approximately 50 miles (80 km), then west at Red House and past Golconda and a spur of the Sonoma Range. It merges with the Reese River near Battle Mountain and receives the Little Humboldt River approximately 5 miles (8 km) upstream from Winnemucca.

Past the junction with the Little Humboldt, the river turns southwest, flowing past Winnemucca and through Pershing County, along the western side of the Humboldt Range and the West Humboldt Range. In central Pershing County, the Rye Patch Dam impounds the river, forming the Rye Patch Reservoir, which stores water to irrigate farms near Lovelock, 22 miles (35 km) downstream. The Humboldt empties into an intermittent lake in the Humboldt Sink on the border between Pershing and Churchill counties, approximately 20 miles (32 km) southwest of Lovelock.

The river gains most of its water from snowmelt in the mountains in the eastern part of the watershed, most importantly the Ruby Mountains, Jarbidge Mountains, and Independence Mountains. River flow generally decreases downstream to the west, partly due to water removal from the river for irrigation, especially near Lovelock. Stream-gauge measurements suggest that Palisade Canyon, between Carlin and Beowawe, is the point where the river's flow ceases to increase and begins to decrease. Also, since the Humboldt's water comes almost exclusively from snowmelt, its flow is highly variable from season to season (peak flow occurs during the spring melt) and from year to year (depending on the amount of snow every winter)

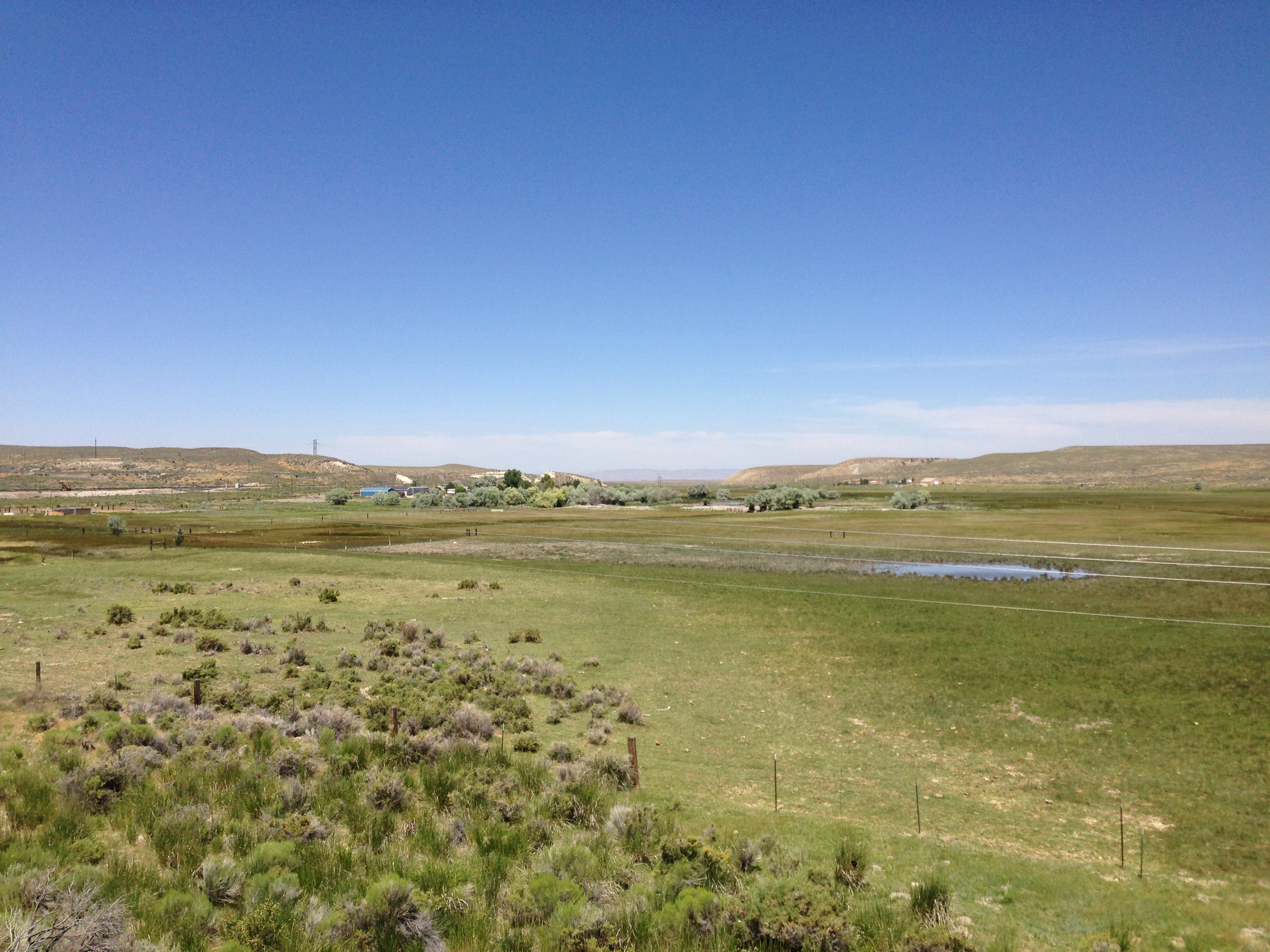
Source of the Humboldt River in Wells

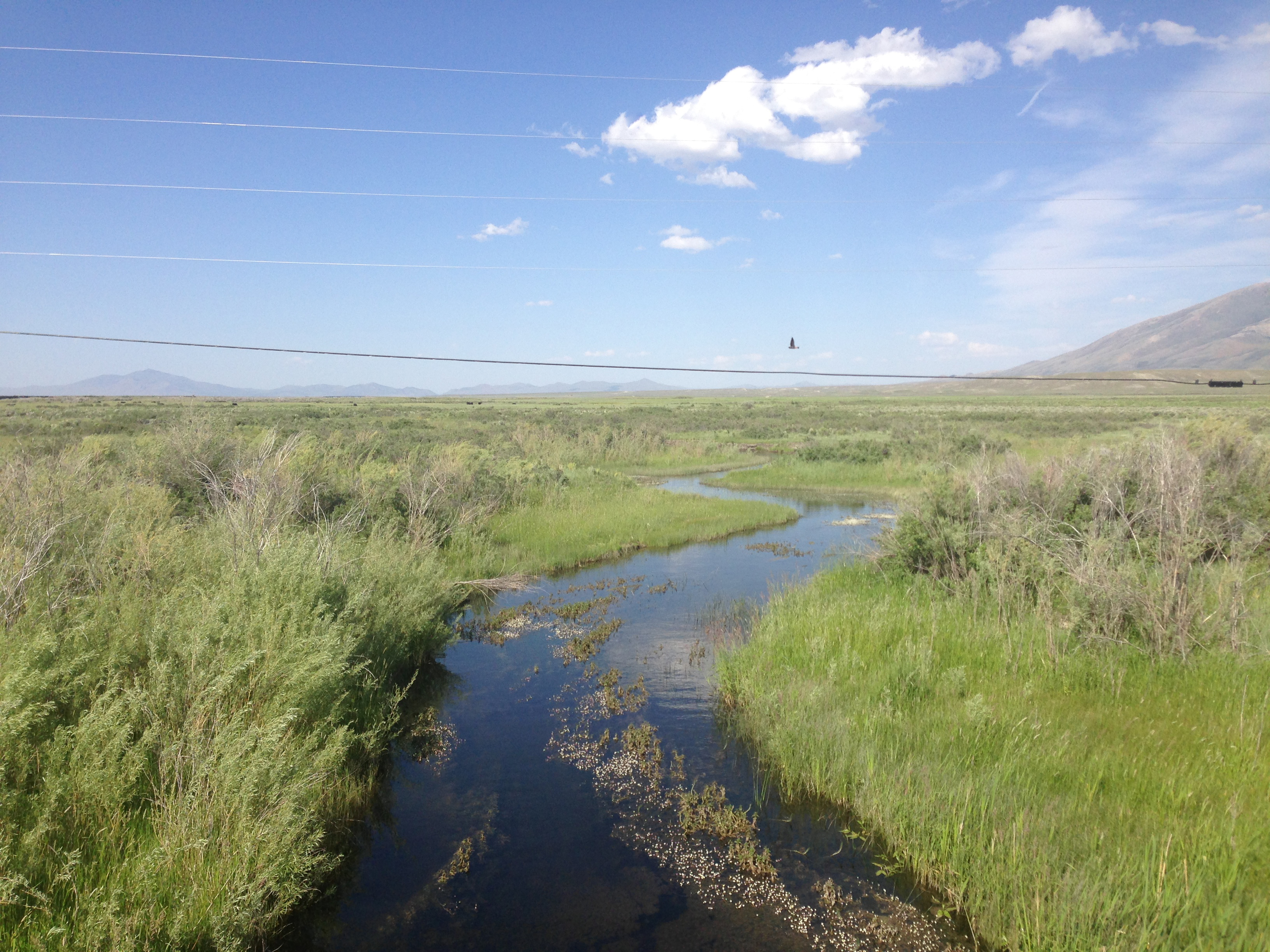
The Humboldt River near Deeth

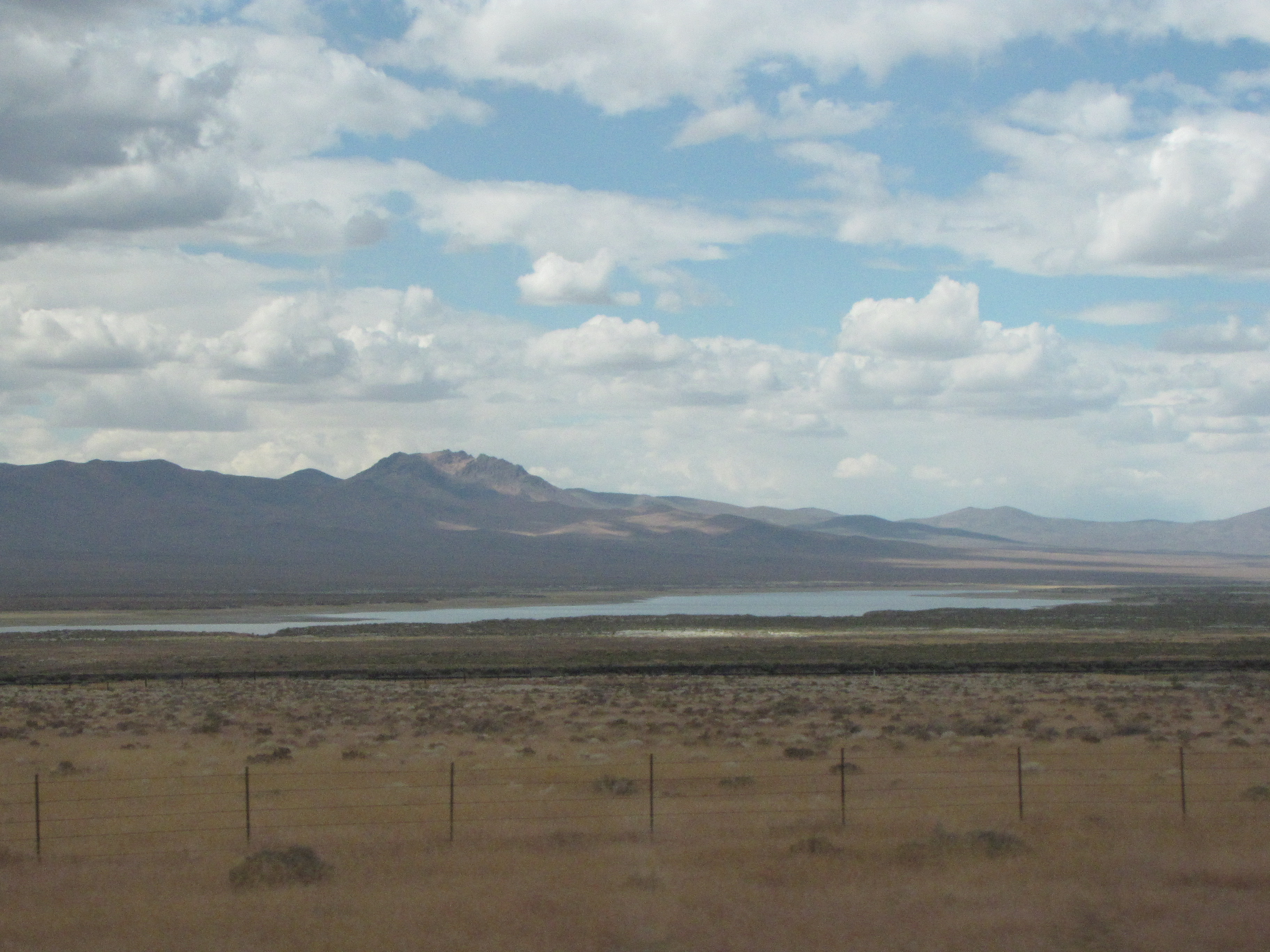
The Humboldt flows through the Rye Patch Reservoir

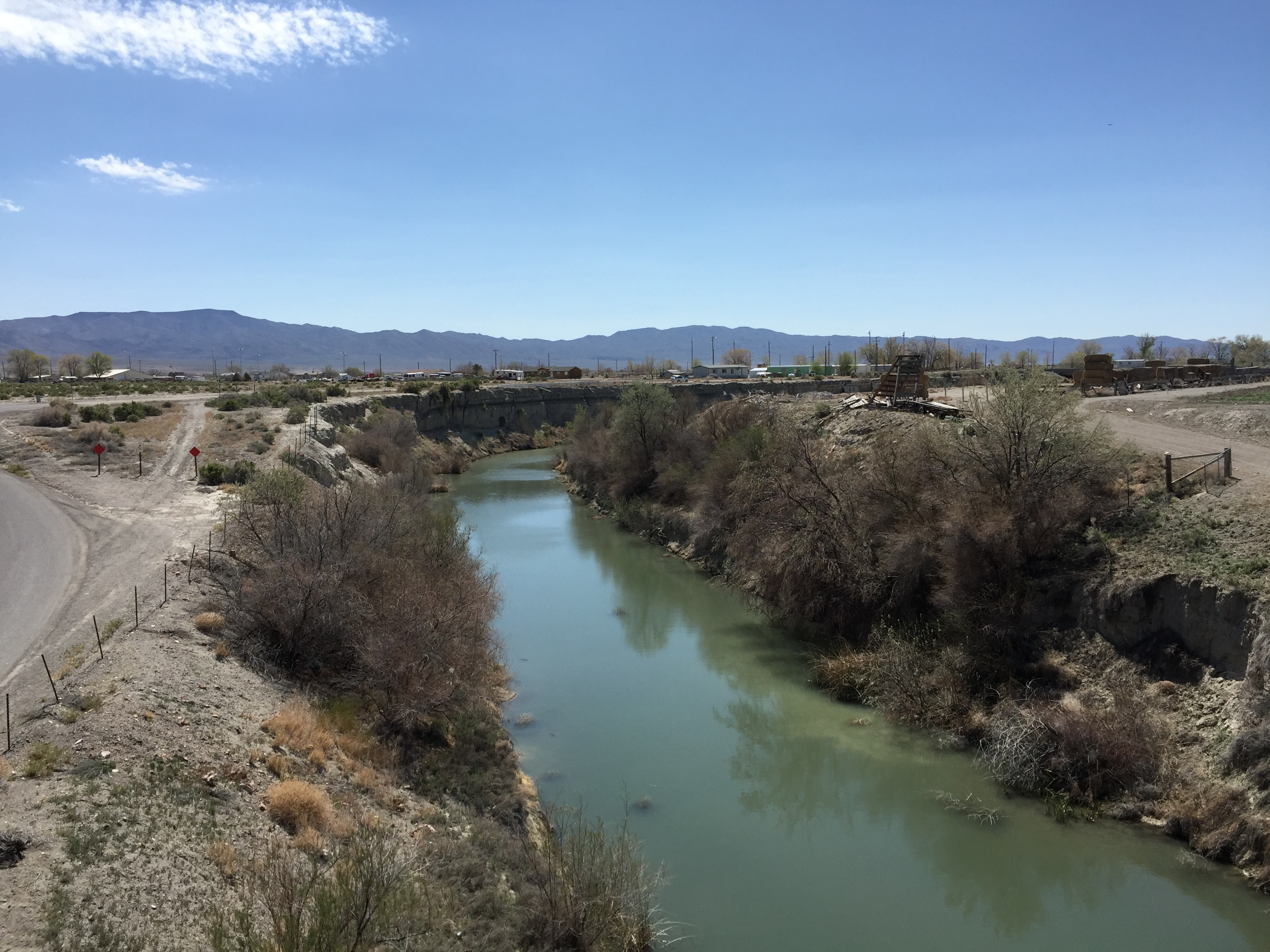
Humboldt River near Lovelock

== Ecology ==
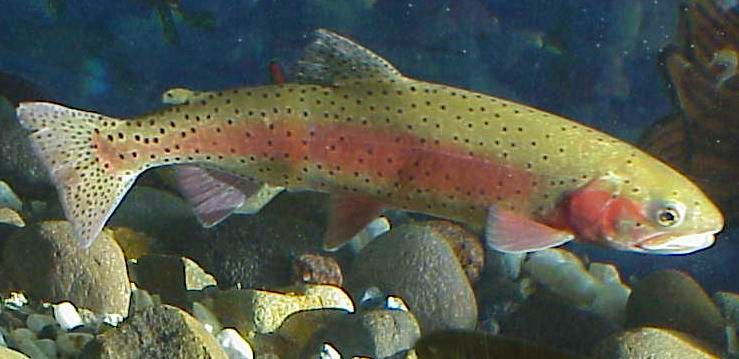
Lahontan Cutthroat Trout

The Lahontan cutthroat trout (Oncorhynchus henshawi) is an inland subspecies of cutthroat trout endemic to northern Nevada, eastern California, and southern Oregon. In 1970, the U.S. Fish and Wildlife Service listed the Lahontan cutthroat trout (LCT) as endangered. In 1975 it reclassified LCT as “threatened” to facilitate management and to allow regulated fishing. Genetic and meristic studies of LCT indicate that the Humboldt River Basin LCT is a unique subspecies: Humboldt cutthroat trout (Oncorhynchus henshawi humboldtensis).

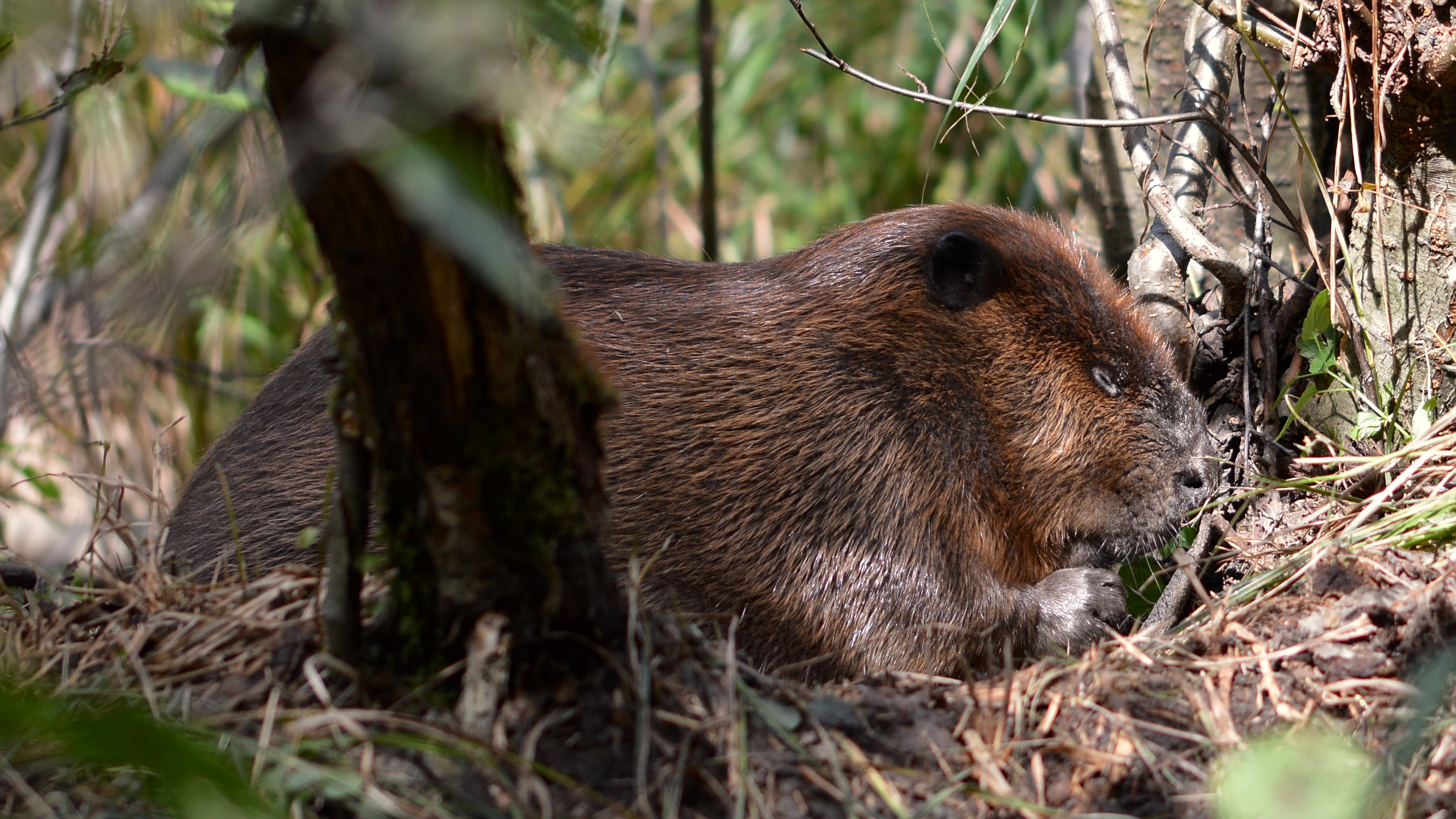
North American Beaver

North American beavers (Castor canadensis) seem to have been making a comeback in Elko County, possibly due to less fur trapping combined with reduced consumption of riparian willow and other vegetation by cattle. Maggie and Susie Creeks, which enter the Humboldt River near Carlin, have benefited from 20 years of work by ranchers, agencies, mines, and non-profit groups via improvements in grazing techniques and specific projects. A remote sensing project found 107 beaver dams along 20 miles (32 km) of Maggie Creek in 2006, which rose to 271 dams in 2010. Beaver dams are accelerating the recovery of riparian vegetation and widening the riparian zone as they slow the water and collect sediment that used to be lost downstream. In five years, beaver ponds have increased the amount of impounded water on Maggie Creek from 9 miles (14 km) of the stream to 16 miles (26 km). The impounded water is seeping into the ground and raising the water table. Newmont's shallow groundwater monitoring wells along Maggie Creek have shown about a 2-foot (0.6 m) rise over the past 17 years along Maggie Creek. Stream flows are more perennial, making more water available for wildlife and livestock and protecting populations of native trout. Maggie Creek has a Beaver Creek tributary which flows from Beaver Peak in the Tuscarora Mountains.

== Environmental aspects ==
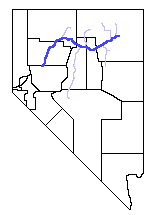
Humboldt River Course Map

In 1942, the Nevada Legislature passed a law instructing the State Engineer to form a cooperative agreement with the United States Geological Survey to conduct ongoing water safety studies throughout the state and publish the results in a series called the Water Resources Bulletin. The first covering the Humboldt was issued in 1962 (Bulletin 19).

In 1985, USGS found elevated, but not unusual, contaminant concentrations in localized samples.

Two studies led by USGS researchers, in 2002 and 2003, examined mercury contamination originating from abandoned mines and both determining that mercury concentrations decreased sharply with increased distance from the former mining sites. The 2003 summarized its findings that "Water quality in even the worst cases is naturally attenuated to meet water-quality standards within about 1 km of the source. Only a few historical mines release acidic water with elevated metal concentrations to small streams that reach the Humboldt River, and these contaminants and are not detectable in the Humboldt."

In 2007, USGS analyzed fish from the river's south fork and reported mercury concentrations ranging from 0.061 to 0.082 micrograms per gram of tissue, significantly below EPA guidelines of 0.30 micrograms per gram.

In 2019, University of Nevada, Reno and USGS researchers analyzed samples collected along multiple points of river, concluded that concentrations of toxic elements, specifically arsenic—while consistently present throughout the sampled areas—did not reach levels posing severe environmental or public health risks and are the result of natural processes.

== See also ==
- List of Nevada rivers
- Sarah Winnemucca
