= Carlin Canyon (Nevada) =

Canyon in Elko County, Nevada, US

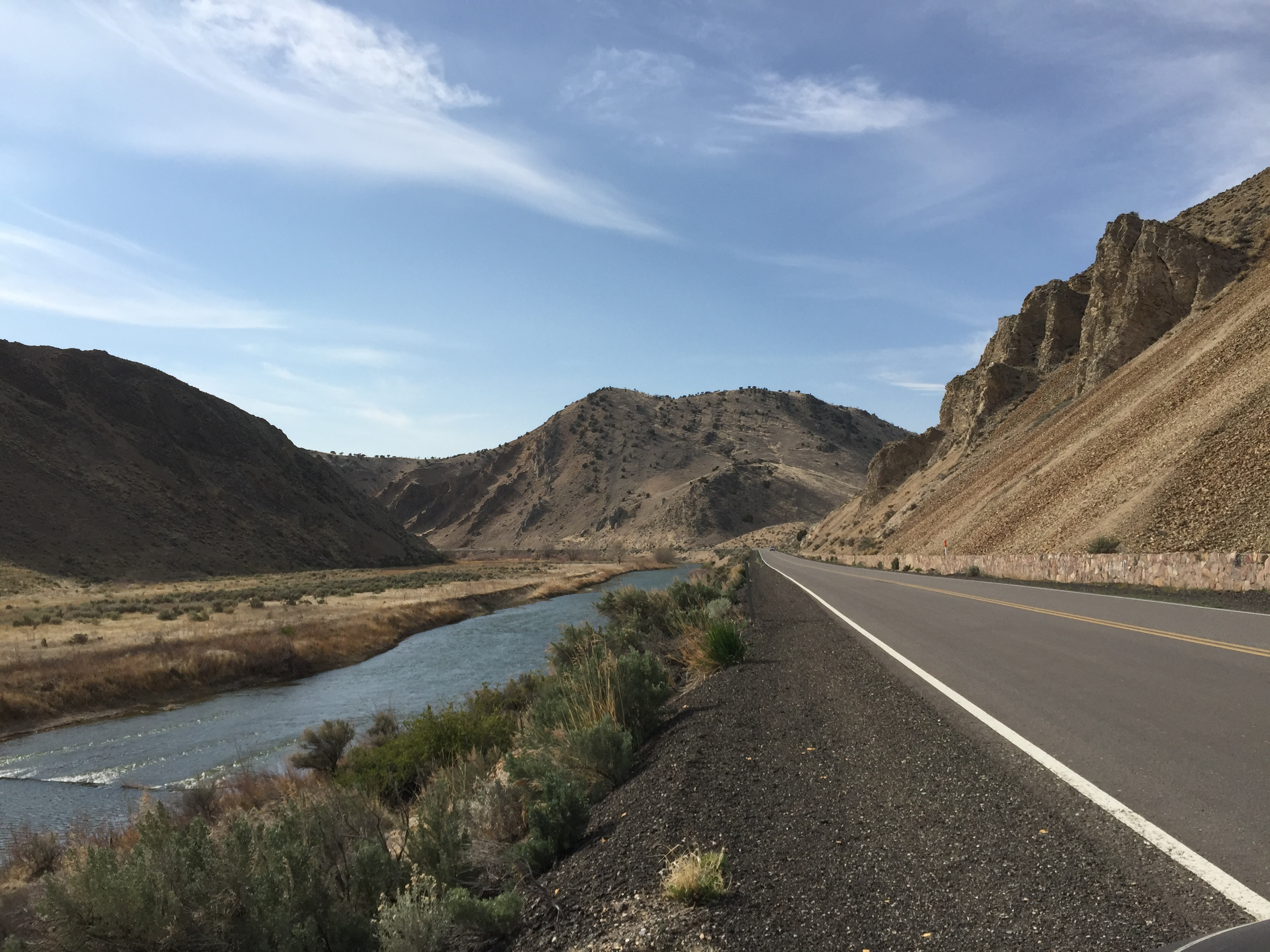
- View west along old U.S. Route 40 and the Humboldt River in the Carlin Canyon

- Location within Nevada
- Floor elevation: 4,928 feet (1,500 m) at the mouth

Geography
- Location: Elko County, Nevada, United States
- Coordinates: 40°44′03″N 115°58′53″W
- Traversed by: I-80
- Rivers: Humboldt River
- Interactive map of Carlin Canyon

Carlin Canyon is a steep-sided canyon carved by the Humboldt River in southwestern Elko County, Nevada, United States. The California Trail, First transcontinental railroad and Victory Highway have all passed through the canyon in the past. At present, Interstate 80 and the Union Pacific Railroad both traverse the canyon, though both bypass a sharp loop in the canyon via the Carlin Tunnel.

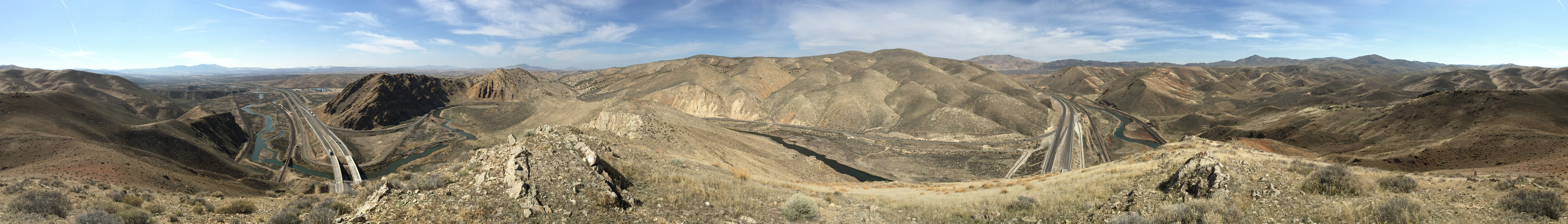
360-degree panorama from the hill directly above the Carlin Tunnel within the canyon
