= City of San Francisco (train) =

Chicago to San Francisco passenger express train

- Union Pacific train 101, the City of San Francisco, near Cheyenne, Wyoming on December 4, 1948

Overview
- Service type: Inter-city rail
- Status: Discontinued
- Locale: Western United States
- First service: June 14, 1936; 90 years ago
- Last service: June 10, 1972; 54 years ago
- Successor: San Francisco Zephyr
- Former operators: Chicago and North Western Railway; Milwaukee Road; Union Pacific Railroad; Southern Pacific Railroad; Amtrak

Route
- Termini: Chicago, Illinois (pre-1971); Denver, Colorado (post-1971); Oakland, California; San Francisco, California
- Stops: 37 (westbound); 38 (eastbound)
- Average journey time: 45 hours 45 minutes (westbound); 43 hours 44 minutes (eastbound)
- Train numbers: 103-101 (westbound); 102-104 (eastbound)
- Line used: Overland Route

Technical
- Track gauge: 4 ft 8 1/2 in (1,435 mm)
- Operating speed: 49.5 mph (westbound); 51.8 mph (eastbound)

The City of San Francisco was a streamlined through passenger train which ran from 1936 to 1971 on the Overland Route between Chicago, Illinois and Oakland, California, with a ferry or bus connection on to San Francisco. It was owned and operated jointly by the Chicago and North Western Railway (1936–55), Chicago, Milwaukee, St. Paul and Pacific Railroad (1955–71), the Union Pacific Railroad, and the Southern Pacific Railroad. It provided premium extra fare service from Chicago to San Francisco when introduced in 1936 with a running time of 39 hours and 45 minutes each way.

== History ==
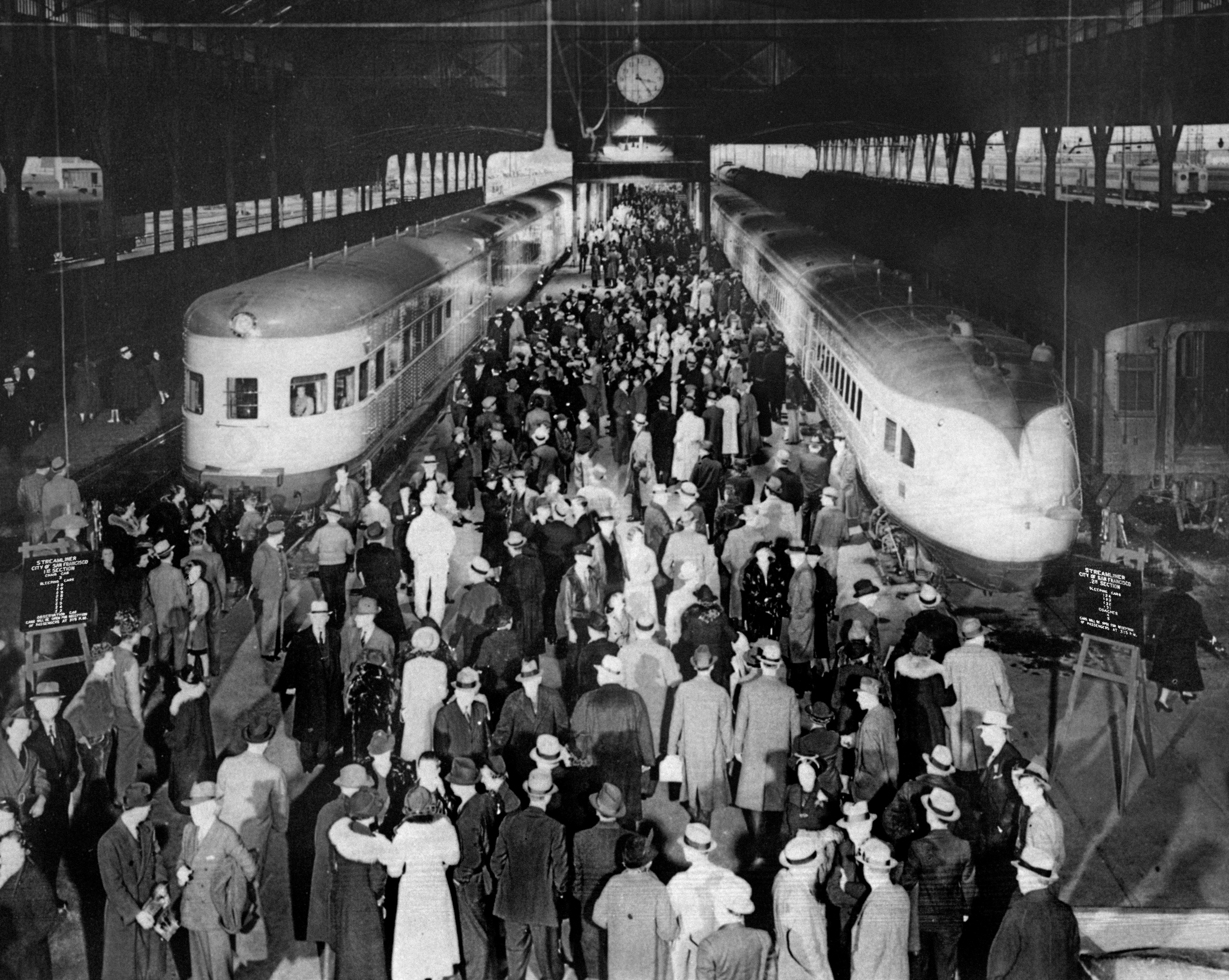
First run of the new (l) and last of the original (r) City train sets, January 2, 1938. Note the lower and tapered profile of the older cars.

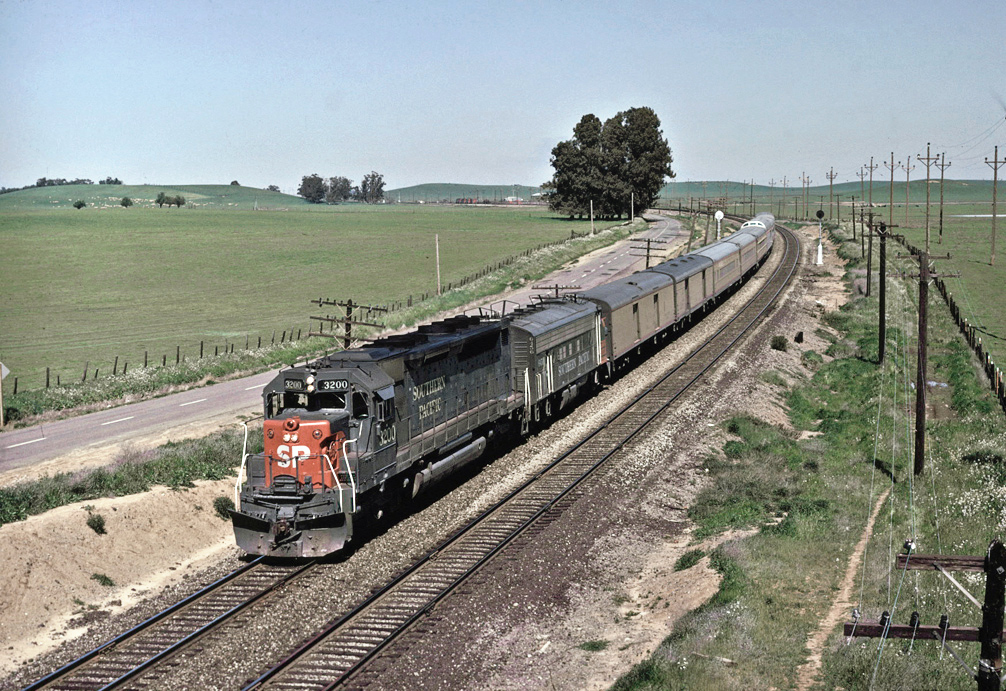
Southern Pacific SDP45 leads City of San Francisco west at SN overpass 38.29°N 121.9597°W, Cannon CA, in April 1971— just before Amtrak

The City of San Francisco (TR 101-102) made its first run between Chicago and Oakland/San Francisco on June 14, 1936.

On July 26, 1941, a second set of equipment entered service allowing departures ten times per month each way. The added service replaced the short-lived steam powered Pullman-built mostly heavyweight (steel) streamline Forty-Niner that had operated an almost ten-hour slower 49-hour run five times a month between Chicago and San Francisco from July 8, 1937 to July 27, 1941. Under an order of the War Production Board, no new head-end or passenger cars of any type (other than "military sleepers") were built and delivered to US railroads from mid 1942 until late 1945.

On October 1, 1946, service was increased to thrice weekly departures from both Chicago and San Francisco made every Tuesday, Thursday and Saturday evening. On September 1, 1947, the City became daily with the creation of additional train sets to support seven-day-a-week operation in both directions of its 39-and-a-half-hour service. This change relegated the long-standing (since 1887) Overland to a secondary, no longer "limited" train in providing daily service between Chicago and Oakland/San Francisco on the Overland Route.

Competing streamlined passenger trains were, starting in 1949, the California Zephyr on the Western Pacific (WP), Denver and Rio Grande Western (D&RGW), and Chicago, Burlington and Quincy (CB&Q) Railroads, and starting in 1954, the San Francisco Chief on the Atchison, Topeka and Santa Fe Railway (AT&SF).

On October 30, 1955, the Milwaukee Road replaced the Chicago and North Western between Chicago and Omaha. In 1960 the City of San Francisco was combined with the City of Los Angeles east of Ogden.

On July 16, 1962, the SP's San Francisco Overland (TR 27-28) ended its long run as a separate San Francisco/Oakland to Ogden year-round daily train when that service was consolidated with the City of San Francisco except for occasional summer and holiday seasonal extra section runs of the Overland which service ended on January 2, 1964.

On May 1, 1971, Amtrak took over all long-distance inter city passenger operations in the United States, discontinuing the MILW-UP-SP City of San Francisco. Amtrak retained the name for the thrice-weekly Denver–San Francisco/Oakland portion of the run until June 1972, when the entire Chicago-San Francisco/Oakland route became daily again as the San Francisco Zephyr. Amtrak replaced its service between Chicago and San Francisco/Oakland on July 16, 1983 with its current daily train, the California Zephyr, when a portion of the route was moved from Union Pacific tracks in Wyoming to those of the Denver and Rio Grande Western Railroad in Colorado.

=== Incidents ===
On August 12, 1939, the City of San Francisco derailed near Palisade, Nevada. Two dozen passengers and crew members were killed with many more injured. The incident was ruled an act of sabotage, but remains unsolved despite years of investigation.

On January 13, 1952, the westbound City of San Francisco was trapped in a blizzard at Yuba Pass in the Sierra Nevada, 17 miles (27 km) west of Donner Pass (Track #1 at 39.3262°N 120.593°W). Snow drifts from 100-mile-per-hour (160 km/h) winds blocked the train, burying it in 12 feet (3.7 meters) of snow and stranding it for six days. The event made international headlines. During the effort to reach the train, the railroad's snow-clearing equipment and snow-blowing rotary plows became frozen to the tracks near Emigrant Gap. Hundreds of workers and volunteers, including escaped German POW Georg Gaertner, rescued stranded passengers by clearing nearby Route 40 to reach the train. The 196 passengers and 30 crewmembers were evacuated within 72 hours of rescuers reaching the train. Upon evacuation, they traveled on foot to vehicles that carried them the few highway miles to Nyack Lodge. The train itself was extricated three days later on January 19.

== Operations and equipment ==
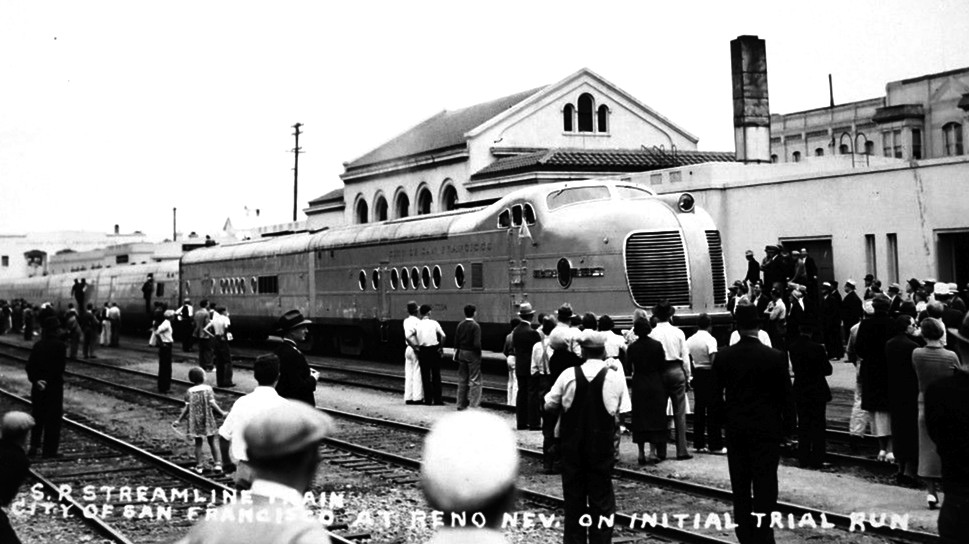
The M-10004 trainset at Reno, Nevada on a trial run

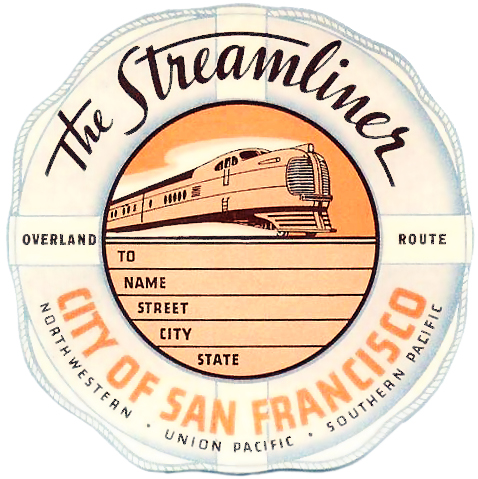
City of San Francisco baggage label 1936

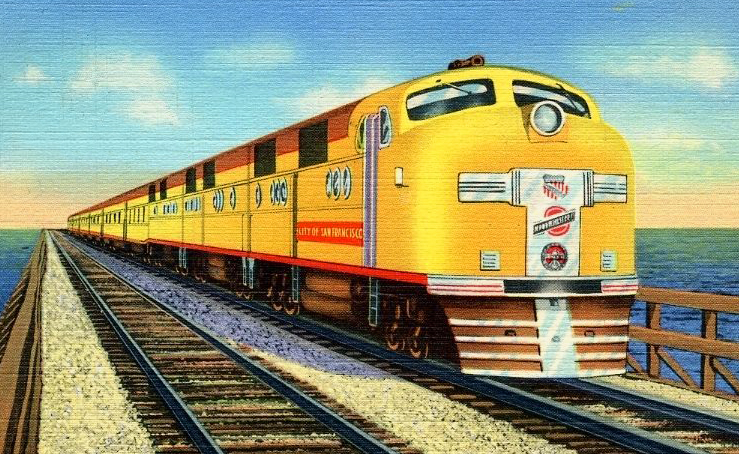
The new 17-car City consist crossing over the Great Salt Lake (Lucin Cutoff) c. 1939

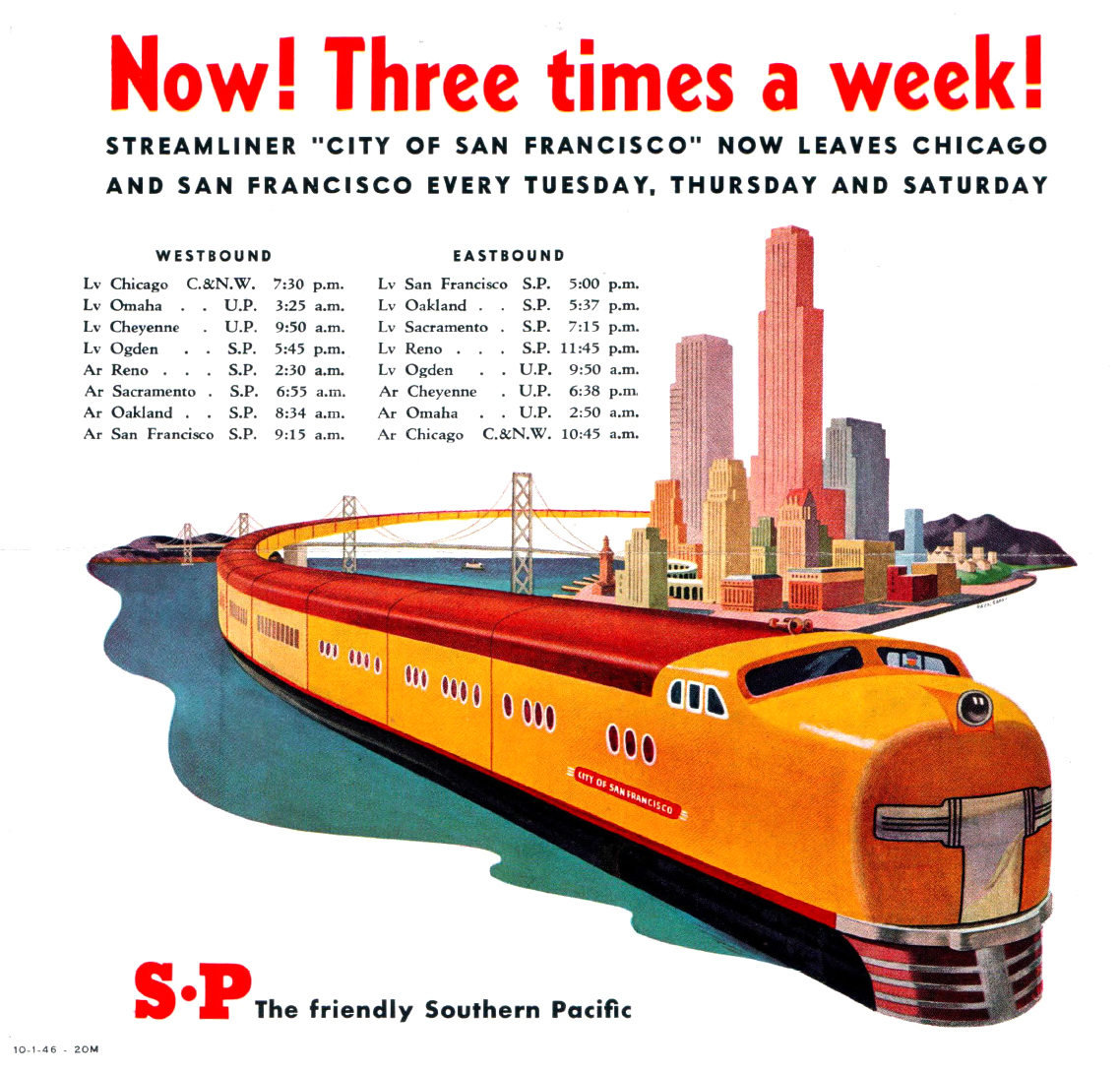
SP mailer, Oct 1, 1946

A consist is the group of rail vehicles (cars plus locomotives) making up a train.

The 1936 City of San Francisco had a Pullman-built 11-car articulated lightweight streamline consist: two 1,200 hp (890 kW) diesel-electric power unit cars (M-10004A/B), a baggage-mail car, a baggage-dormitory-kitchen car, a diner-lounge car, four named sleeper cars, a 48-seat chair car, and a 38-seat coach-buffet-blind end observation car.

The City's original train set was replaced on January 2, 1938, with an all new 1/4-mile-long (400 m), semi-articulated 17-car lightweight streamline consist made up of one EMC-E2A and two EMC-E2B 1,800 hp (1,300 kW) diesel-electric power unit cars (SF 1-2-3) built by the Electro-Motive Corporation (now EMD), and 14 aluminum-alloy girder-type Pullman-built cars consisting of an auxiliary power-baggage-dormitory car, a 54-seat chair car, a 32-seat coffee shop-kitchen car, a 72-seat diner, a dormitory-buffet-lounge car, eight named sleeper cars, and an 84-foot 6-inch buffet-lounge-observation car (NOB HILL) said to be the "longest passenger car built in the United States" to that time.

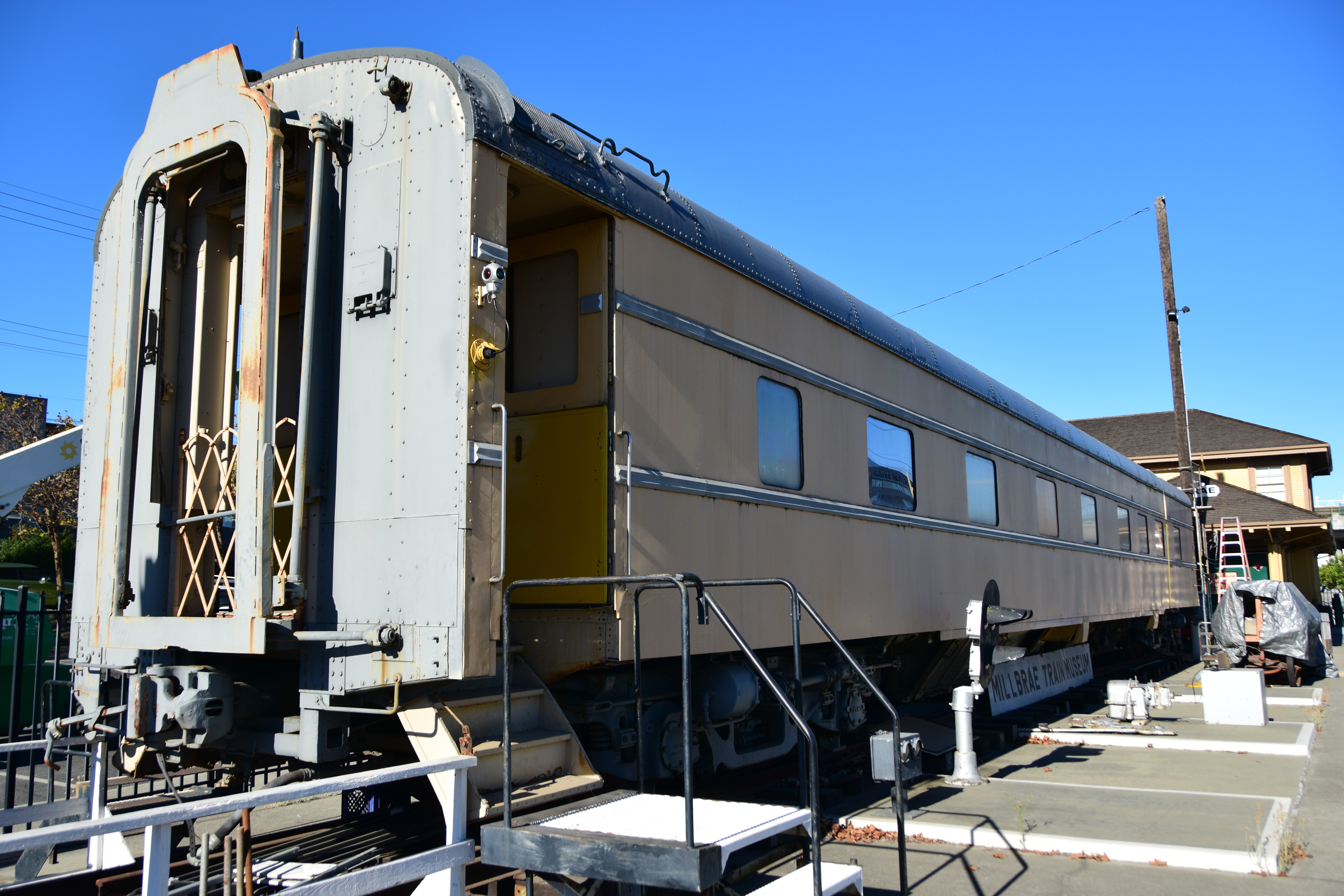
Former City of San Francisco Sleeper Civic Center

While costing over $2 million to build, operating costs (fuel, crew, etc) for the train were less than two cents per passenger-mile. After both the original and new train sets made a joint run from Oakland to Chicago on that date, the older 11-car consist was shopped for a seven-month rebuild and then used over the next decade as the City of Los Angeles, City of Denver, or City of Portland before being withdrawn in spring 1948 and eventually scrapped.

The City of San Francisco train sets were jointly owned by the C&NW, UP and SP with the exception of the sleepers which were Pullman-owned until 1945 when two of those cars were acquired by the C&NW and a dozen by the UP. The new train was capable of speeds up to 110 miles per hour (180 km/h) and accommodated 222 passengers. Sleeping car space was double that of conventional trains with 168 berths compared to 84 while chair car space was increased to 54. The new City consist had 60 compartments, drawing rooms, bedrooms, and "roomettes" instead of the regular nine for a larger variety of sleeping accommodations to choose from than on any train in America. Among the premium services provided on the train were stewardess-nurses, a barber shop, a shower bath, and an internal telephone system. All regularly assigned cars were also air-conditioned. Frequency remained at five trips per month each way.

From 1942 to 1946, the lounge-observation car Nob Hill and lounge-buffet car Marina were removed from the City of San Francisco's two train sets and placed in storage during WWII in compliance with a General Order of the Office of Defense Transportation (ODT) banning the carriage of strictly luxury cars without passenger revenue capacity. Those cars were replaced with sleepers.

A fifth consist made possible by the deliveries of new post war cars was added to the City of San Francisco in 1950.

As with the City of Los Angeles, many of the train's cars bore the names of locales around its namesake city, including Mission Dolores, the nickname given to San Francisco's Mission San Francisco de Asís.

== Other railroad uses of the name City of San Francisco ==
The City of San Francisco name has been applied to a 10/6 sleeping car built by Pullman Standard in the early 1950s. The car is now owned by the Boone and Scenic Valley Railroad and operates on the line's dinner and first class trains. Union Pacific itself has a dome lounge car used on excursion and executive trains which carries the City of San Francisco name.

== See also ==
- Passenger service on the Chicago and North Western Railway
- Passenger service on the Milwaukee Road
- Passenger service on the Southern Pacific Railroad
- Passenger service on the Union Pacific Railroad
