= Palisade Canyon =

Canyon in Eureka County, Nevada, USA

Coordinates: 40°34′51″N 116°19′12″W

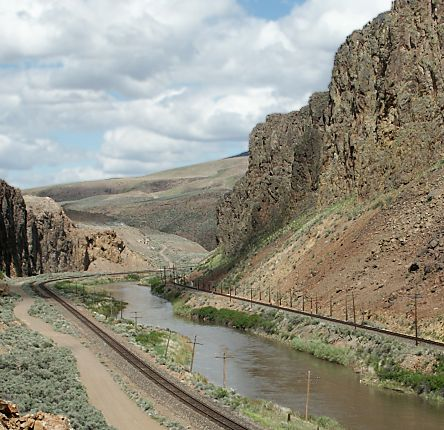
The Feather River Route and First transcontinental railroad in Palisade Canyon are on opposite sides of the Humboldt River, 2008

Palisade Canyon is a canyon along the Humboldt River in northern Eureka County, Nevada, United States.

== Description ==
The canyon runs along the Humboldt River roughly between State Route 278 upstream (about 7.5 miles [12.1 km] south–southwest of Carlin), and a point about 8 miles (13 km) west of Beowawe and State Route 306 downstream (about 32 miles [51 km] east–southeast of Battle Mountain).

The Humboldt River, rather than flowing into the ocean, eventually loses all its water to evaporation in the Humboldt Sink, and stream-gauge measurements undertaken by the United States Geological Survey suggest that Palisade Canyon is the point where the river's flow ceases to increase and begins to decrease.

The canyon was named from a fancied resemblance to the Hudson River Palisades.
