= Carlin, Nevada =

City in Nevada, United States

- City
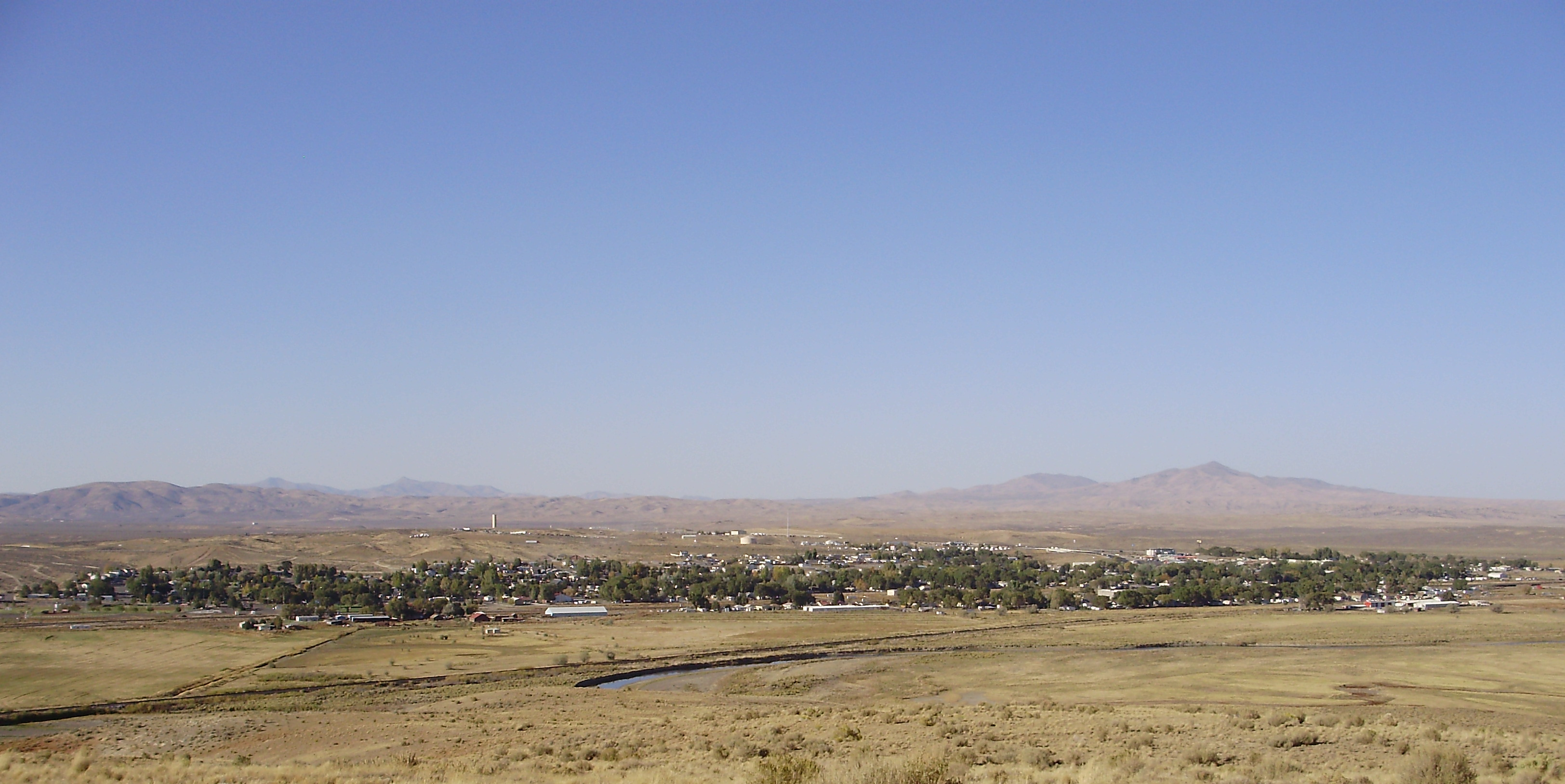

- Logo
- Motto: Where the Train Stops... & the Gold Rush Begins
- Location of Carlin, Nevada

- Location within the United States
- Coordinates: 40°43′05″N 116°07′46″W
- Country: United States
- State: Nevada
- County: Elko

Government
  - Mayor: Dana Holbrook
  - Vice Mayor: Margaret Johnston

Area
  - Total: 10.44 sq mi (27.05 km^{2})
  - Land: 10.44 sq mi (27.05 km^{2})
  - Water: 0 sq mi (0.00 km^{2})
- Elevation: 4,944 ft (1,507 m)

Population (2020)
  - Total: 2,050
  - Density: 196/sq mi (75.8/km^{2})
- Time zone: UTC−8 (Pacific (PST))
  - Summer (DST): UTC−7 (PDT)
- ZIP code: 89822
- Area code: 775
- FIPS code: 32-08900
- GNIS feature ID: 2409983
- Website: www.explorecarlinnv.com

Nevada Historical Marker
- Reference no.: 112

Carlin is a small city in Elko County in northeast Nevada, United States, and 23 miles (37 km) west of the city of Elko. As of the 2020 census, Carlin had a population of 2,050. Carlin sits along Interstate 80 at an elevation of approximately 4,900 feet (1,500 m). The city was named for Civil War general William Passmore Carlin. Its slogan is "Where the Train Stops... and the Gold Rush Begins".

== History ==
The town was founded in December 1868, at the eastern terminus of the Central Pacific Railroad's Humboldt Division. The railroad built extensive facilities, including a roundhouse, machine shops, and a new depot in 1906. An ice-harvesting industry also developed, supplying ice for the railroad's refrigerator cars.

The Southern Pacific Railroad maintained the Carlin Shops, a major repair and maintenance center, near the depot at the foot of Sixth Street in Carlin. Construction of the Carlin Shops began in 1869. Its history was documented around 1968 by the Historic American Engineering Record.

On August 12, 1939, the City of San Francisco train derailed while crossing a bridge near Carlin, killing 24 and injuring 121. The wreck appeared to have been caused by sabotage but remains unsolved to this day. The train was operated by a joint partnership of the Chicago and North Western Railway, the Southern Pacific Railroad, and the Union Pacific Railroad.

Carlin was the home of John "Rolling Thunder" Pope (1916–1997), who had worked as a brakeman on the railway.

== Geography ==
Carlin is located southeast of the Carlin Trend, one of the most productive gold mining areas in the United States. According to the United States Census Bureau, the city has a total area of 27.0 square kilometres (10.4 sq mi), all of it land.

=== Climate ===
Climate data for Pine Valley - Carlin 20S, Nevada, 1991–2020 normals, extremes 1982–present: 5,176 ft (1,578 m)
Month	Jan	Feb	Mar	Apr	May	Jun	Jul	Aug	Sep	Oct	Nov	Dec	Year
Record high °F (°C)	66 (19)	70 (21)	80 (27)	88 (31)	98 (37)	103 (39)	106 (41)	104 (40)	102 (39)	95 (35)	76 (24)	63 (17)	106 (41)
Mean maximum °F (°C)	51.1 (10.6)	57.1 (13.9)	66.5 (19.2)	77.4 (25.2)	85.9 (29.9)	93.5 (34.2)	99.2 (37.3)	97.5 (36.4)	90.4 (32.4)	82.0 (27.8)	63.0 (17.2)	51.0 (10.6)	96.2 (35.7)
Mean daily maximum °F (°C)	39.2 (4.0)	43.6 (6.4)	54.5 (12.5)	59.4 (15.2)	69.5 (20.8)	80.8 (27.1)	92.3 (33.5)	90.6 (32.6)	81.1 (27.3)	65.9 (18.8)	48.6 (9.2)	38.8 (3.8)	63.7 (17.6)
Daily mean °F (°C)	25.5 (−3.6)	29.7 (−1.3)	38.5 (3.6)	42.3 (5.7)	50.7 (10.4)	58.5 (14.7)	66.6 (19.2)	65.3 (18.5)	56.3 (13.5)	42.9 (6.1)	31.4 (−0.3)	24.6 (−4.1)	44.4 (6.9)
Mean daily minimum °F (°C)	11.9 (−11.2)	15.7 (−9.1)	22.4 (−5.3)	25.3 (−3.7)	31.8 (−0.1)	36.3 (2.4)	40.9 (4.9)	40.0 (4.4)	31.5 (−0.3)	19.8 (−6.8)	14.1 (−9.9)	10.4 (−12.0)	25.0 (−3.9)
Mean minimum °F (°C)	−8.9 (−22.7)	−1.8 (−18.8)	11.6 (−11.3)	13.7 (−10.2)	20.7 (−6.3)	26.7 (−2.9)	32.1 (0.1)	30.8 (−0.7)	19.4 (−7.0)	7.3 (−13.7)	−1.6 (−18.7)	−7.7 (−22.1)	−13.0 (−25.0)
Record low °F (°C)	−29 (−34)	−32 (−36)	−14 (−26)	−3 (−19)	9 (−13)	19 (−7)	12 (−11)	14 (−10)	4 (−16)	−10 (−23)	−21 (−29)	−40 (−40)	−40 (−40)
Average precipitation inches (mm)	1.11 (28)	0.83 (21)	1.02 (26)	1.23 (31)	1.62 (41)	0.86 (22)	0.37 (9.4)	0.44 (11)	0.58 (15)	0.77 (20)	0.83 (21)	1.05 (27)	10.71 (272.4)
Source 1: NOAA
Source 2: XMACIS2 (records & monthly max/mins)

== Demographics ==
Historical population
Census	Pop.	Note	%±
1930	825		—
1940	832		0.8%
1950	1,203		44.6%
1960	1,023		−15.0%
1970	1,313		28.3%
1980	1,232		−6.2%
1990	2,220		80.2%
2000	2,161		−2.7%
2010	2,368		9.6%
2020	2,050		−13.4%
U.S. Decennial Census

Carlin is part of the Elko Micropolitan Statistical Area.

=== 2020 census ===
As of the 2020 census, Carlin had a population of 2,050. The median age was 38.4 years. 22.4% of residents were under the age of 18 and 12.6% of residents were 65 years of age or older. For every 100 females there were 122.1 males, and for every 100 females age 18 and over there were 128.8 males age 18 and over.

0.0% of residents lived in urban areas, while 100.0% lived in rural areas.

There were 793 households in Carlin, of which 30.6% had children under the age of 18 living in them. Of all households, 47.7% were married-couple households, 25.7% were households with a male householder and no spouse or partner present, and 17.9% were households with a female householder and no spouse or partner present. About 28.0% of all households were made up of individuals and 11.6% had someone living alone who was 65 years of age or older.

There were 907 housing units, of which 12.6% were vacant. The homeowner vacancy rate was 2.2% and the rental vacancy rate was 14.5%.

Racial composition as of the 2020 census
Race	Number	Percent
White	1,670	81.5%
Black or African American	65	3.2%
American Indian and Alaska Native	33	1.6%
Asian	16	0.8%
Native Hawaiian and Other Pacific Islander	3	0.1%
Some other race	91	4.4%
Two or more races	172	8.4%
Hispanic or Latino (of any race)	228	11.1%

=== 2000 census ===
As of the census of 2000, there were 2,161 people, 792 households, and 579 families residing in the city. The population density was 234.6 inhabitants per square mile (90.6/km^{2}). There were 1,014 housing units at an average density of 110.1 units per square mile (42.5 units/km^{2}). The racial makeup of the city was 91.90% White, 0.05% African American, 1.76% Native American, 0.60% Asian, 0.05% Pacific Islander, 3.79% from other races, and 1.85% from two or more races. Hispanic or Latino of any race were 8.38% of the population.

There were 792 households, out of which 39.3% had children under the age of 18 living with them, 58.6% were married couples living together, 7.1% had a female householder with no husband present, and 26.8% were non-families. 21.6% of all households were made up of individuals, and 5.8% had someone living alone who was 65 years of age or older. The average household size was 2.73 and the average family size was 3.17.

In the city, the population was spread out, with 30.8% under the age of 18, 7.4% from 18 to 24, 31.1% from 25 to 44, 23.5% from 45 to 64, and 7.3% who were 65 years of age or older. The median age was 34 years. For every 100 females, there were 108.8 males. For every 100 females age 18 and over, there were 114.3 males.

The median income for a household in the city was $49,571, and the median income for a family was $51,716. Males had a median income of $47,396 versus $21,813 for females. The per capita income for the city was $19,377. About 4.1% of families and 7.8% of the population were below the poverty line, including 10.2% of those under age 18 and 3.0% of those age 65 or over.

== Arts and culture ==
The Carlin Museum, housed in an old schoolhouse that may date to 1870, preserves the town's heritage. The Carlin Historical Society plans to restore the building to its original state as much as possible.

Carlin has a public library, a branch of the Elko-Lander-Eureka County Library System.

== Government ==
Carlin uses a city council with five councilpeople, including the mayor of the city. As of February 2020, the current mayor of Carlin is Dana Holbrook.

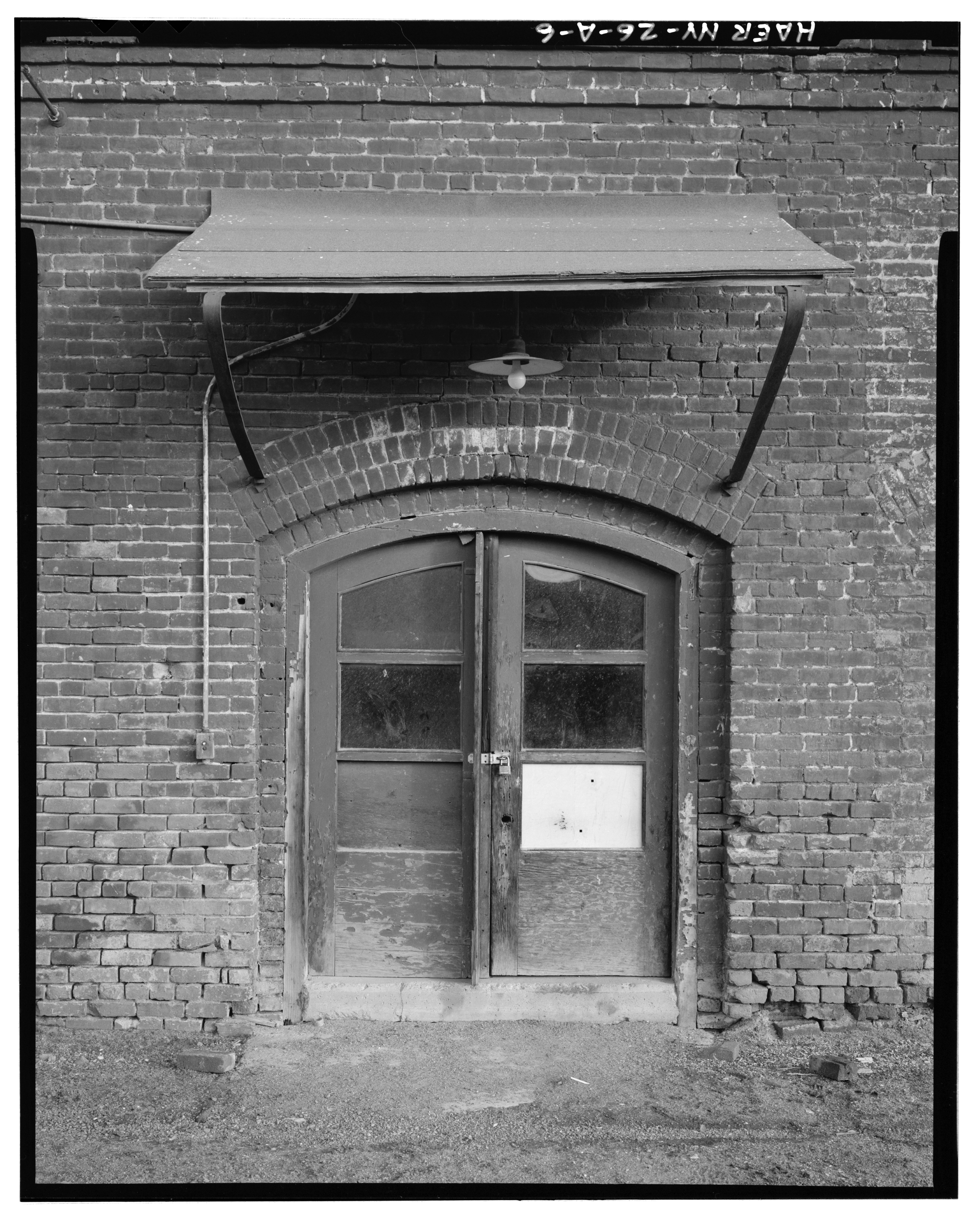
Door of SPRR Carlin Shops, circa 1968

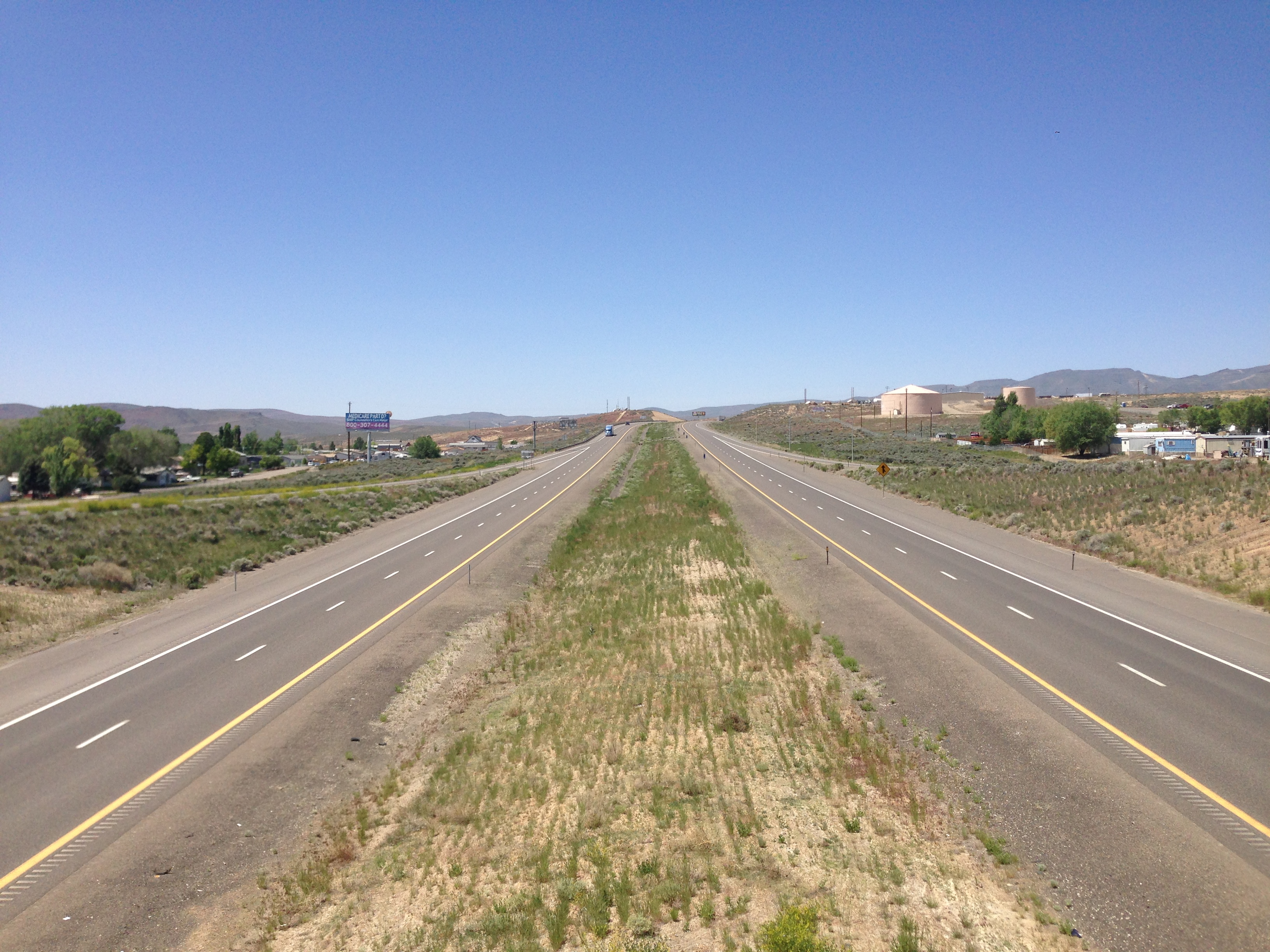
I-80 in Carlin

== See also ==
- Carlin Tunnel
- Gold mining in Nevada
- Newmont Mining Corporation has a large gold-mining operation near Carlin
