= Palisade, Nevada =

Unincorporated community in Nevada, US

- Unincorporated community
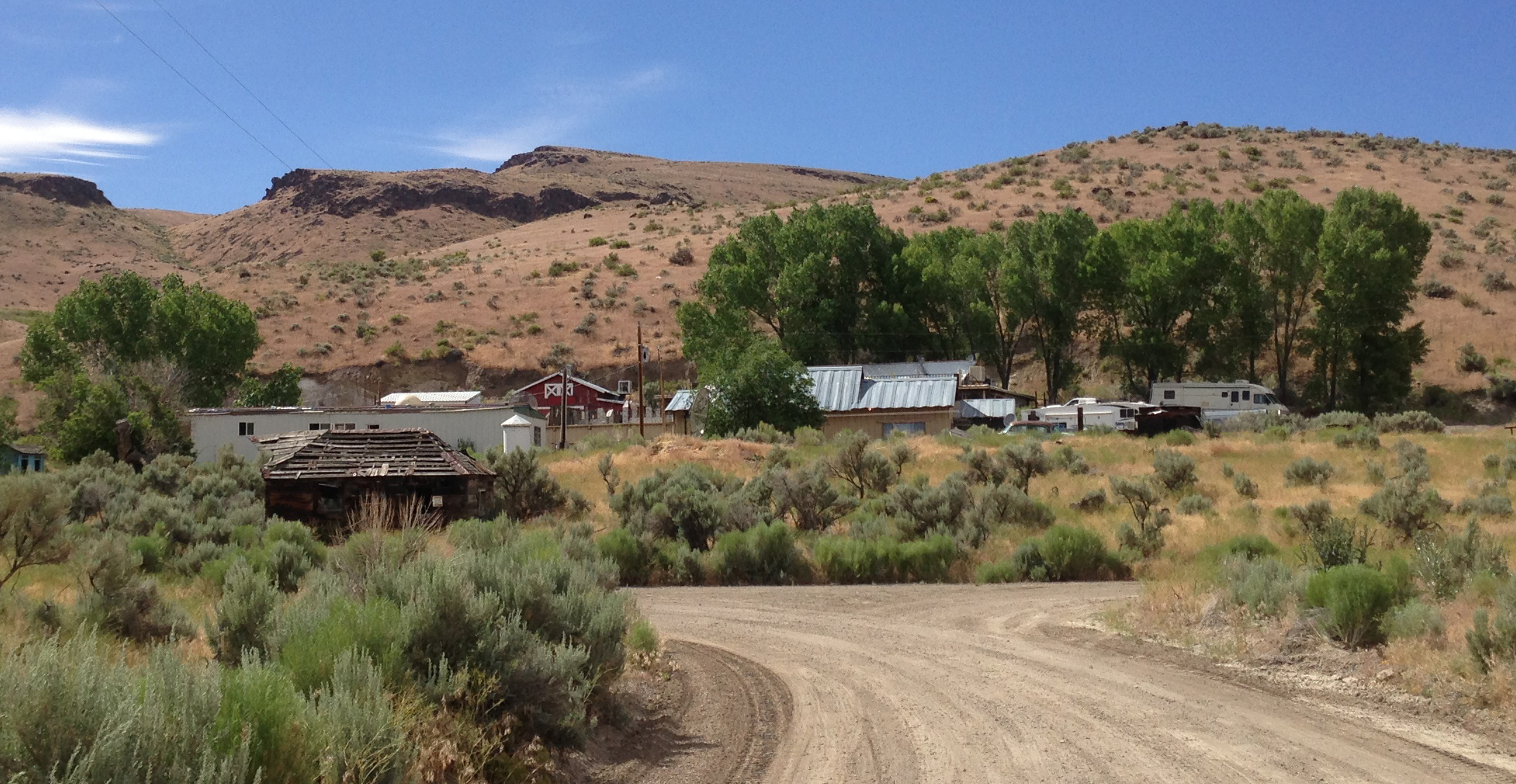

- Location within the state of Nevada
- Coordinates: 40°36′37″N 116°11′55″W
- Country: United States
- State: Nevada
- County: Eureka
- Elevation: 4,853 ft (1,479 m)
- Time zone: UTC-8 (Pacific (PST))
  - Summer (DST): UTC-7 (PDT)
- GNIS feature ID: 847450

Nevada Historical Marker
- Reference no.: 65

Palisade (originally called Palisades) is located in Eureka County in the northeastern section of the state of Nevada, in the western United States. It is about 10 miles (16 km) south of Carlin, and about 33 miles (53 km) southwest of Elko. Although now a virtual ghost town, it had a rich history following construction of the Transcontinental Railroad. The town takes its name from Palisade Canyon (also called "12-Mile" and "10-Mile Canyon"), an important obstacle to the construction and operation of the railroad, which lies to the west.

== History ==
The Palisade community was founded in 1868 as a station on the Central Pacific Railroad. It soon became the transportation hub for Mineral Hill, Hamilton Eureka and other eastern Nevada mining camps. A post office was established at Palisade in May 1870. After the Eureka and Palisade Railroad was established here in 1874, Palisade's population dramatically expanded. Houses and commercial stores were built and by the end of the 1870s, the town had multiple hotels, saloons, other businesses and residences. A school was built and the town had two churches. The local population reached 600.

Palisade was the site of an elaborate hoax during the early 1870s, probably to boost tourism. Whenever a train arrived, the residents were said to stage rampant gunfights and bank robberies. Nobody was privy to knowledge of the hoax except the residents, and the showmanship died off after several years. In reality, crime in Palisade was low and the town did not have a sheriff.

By 1882, the town had a new train station and telegraph office. The new station was used by both railroads. After 1885, the Eureka mines declined, as well as commercial train activity. With the decline of the railroad, and the subsequent loss of jobs, people in town started to move away. In 1908, a third railroad began running through town when the Western Pacific built its line to transport people and goods to northern Nevada. In 1910, flooding destroyed most of the town and damaged all three railroad lines. The town never regained its success after the flooding of 1910.

In 1932, according to legend, Palisade may have been the site of a possible assassination attempt on the life of President Herbert Hoover. Shortly before Hoover's train was to pass through the town, one railroad inspector said he encountered a vagrant by a trestle with 22 sticks of dynamite. Two men skirmished with the inspector and then fled, but another inspector disputed the story and said the vagrant did not have dynamite.

The Palisade post office was discontinued in 1961.

Since the 1920s, the town was owned by relatives of Atlanta businessman John Sexton, who sold the entire town at auction on April 26, 2005, in San Francisco. The town was sold to an unidentified bidder for $150,000. Sexton, who had not visited Palisade for some 35 years, said he sold the town to raise college tuition money for his daughter.

== Gallery ==
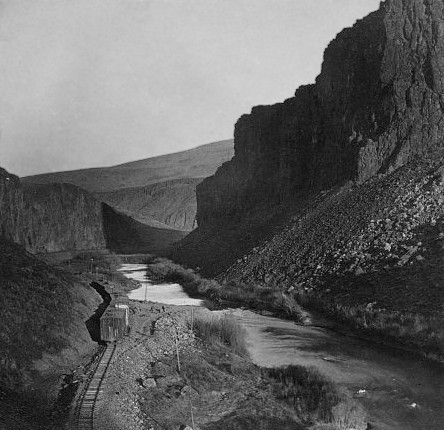
Palisade Canyon, during construction of the Transcontinental Railroad in 1868

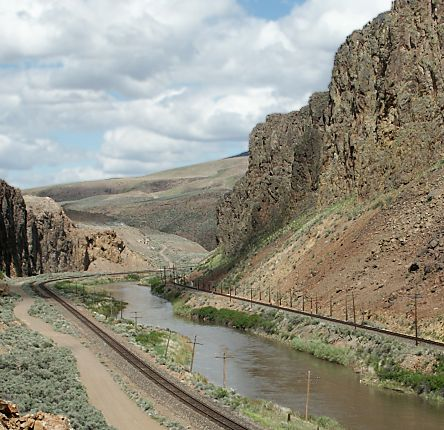
The same site, located just northeast of Palisade, 140 years later

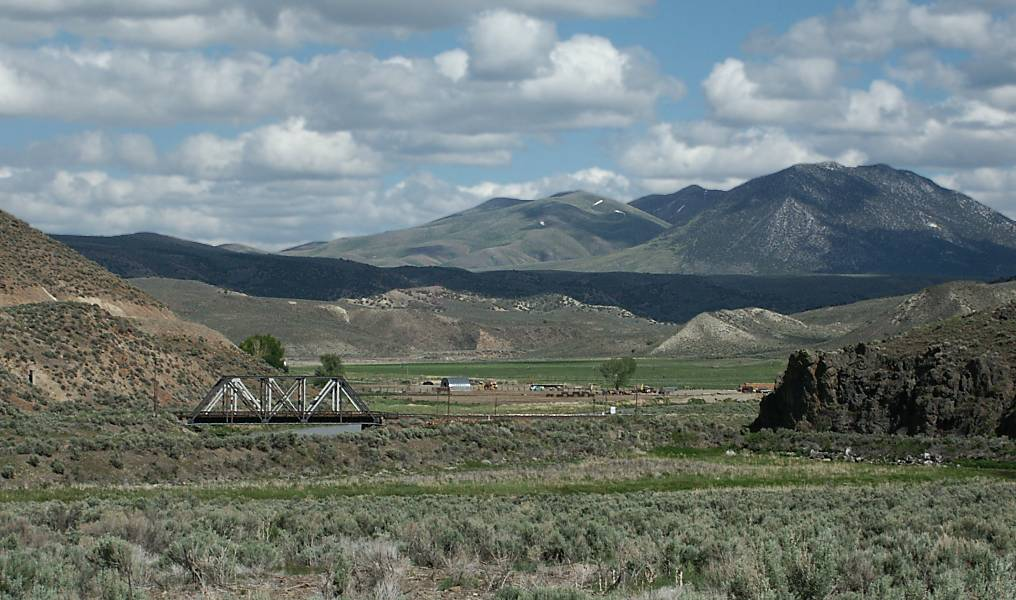
View from Palisade, Nevada, looking southeast towards Pine Mountain

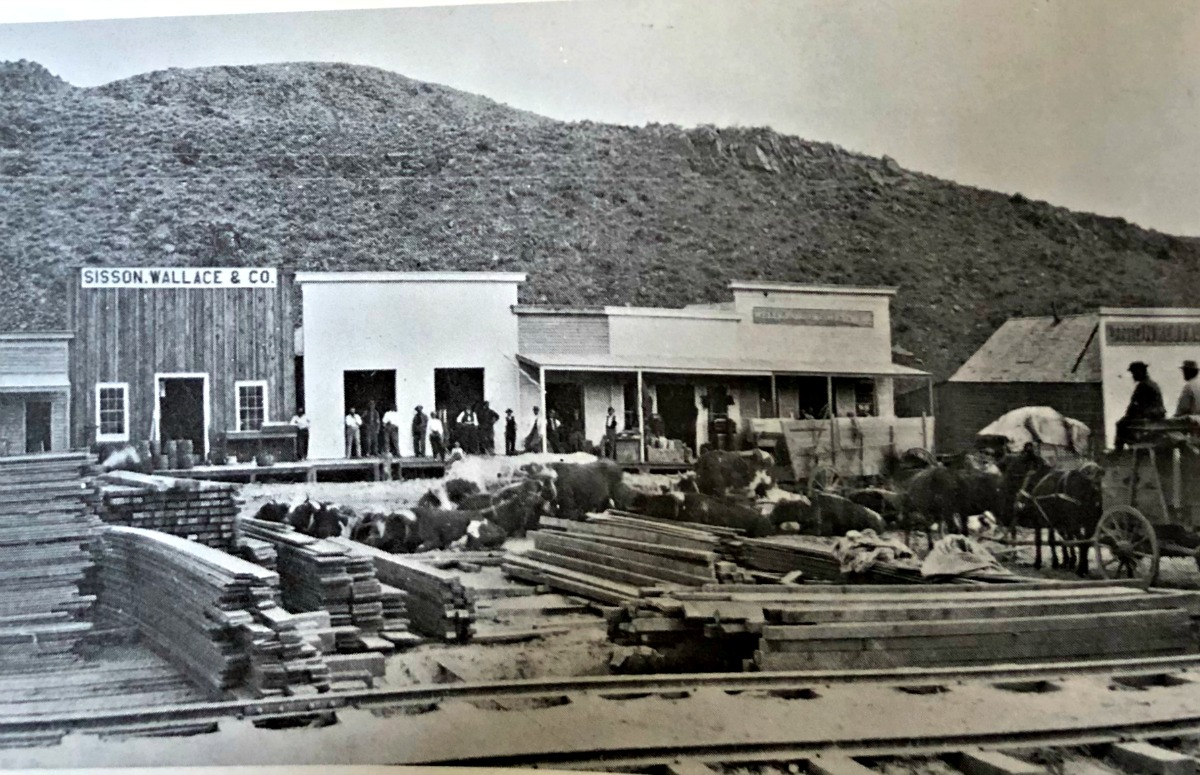
Palisade, 1870s

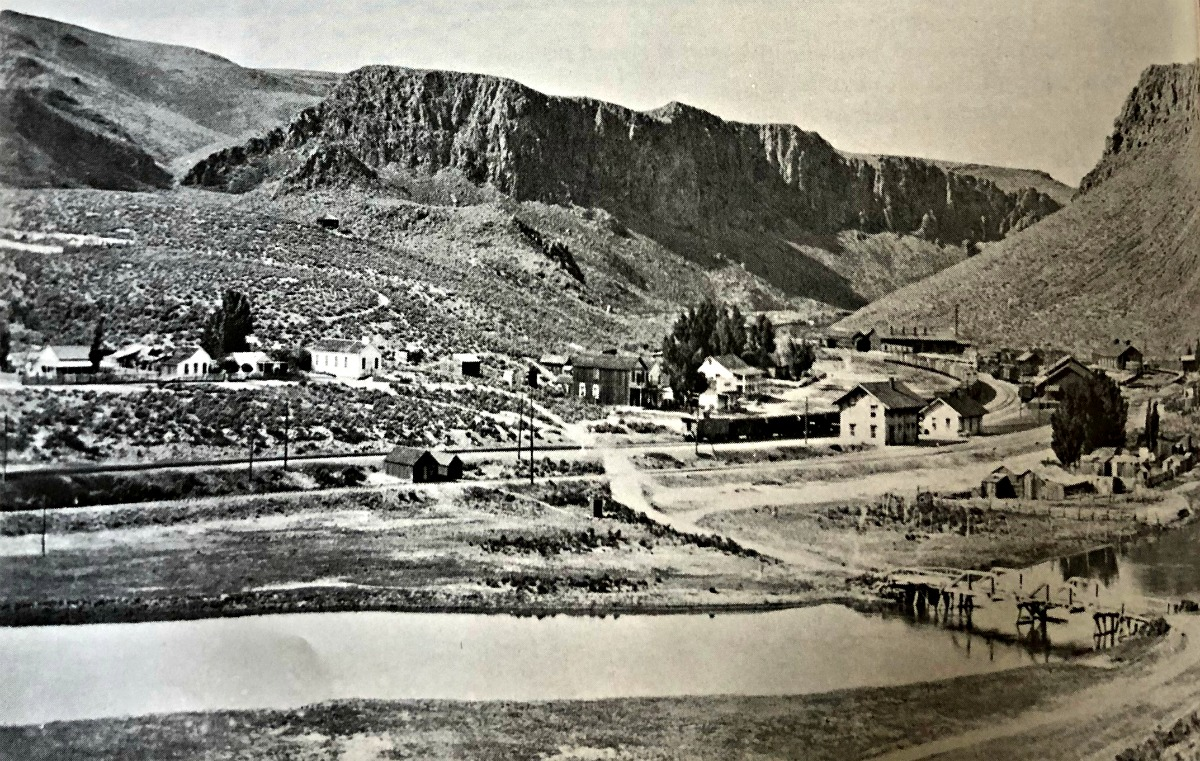
Palisade, 1880s
