= Gold mining in Nevada =

Active gold mines in Nevada, with Reno and Las Vegas

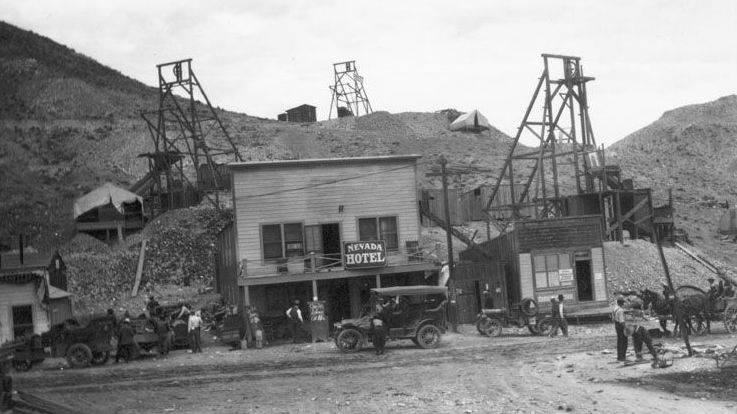
Rawhide, Nevada, 1915

Gold mining in Nevada, a state of the United States, is a major industry, and one of the largest sources of gold in the world. In 2018 Nevada produced 5,581,160 troy ounces (173.6 tonnes), representing 78% of US gold and 5.0% of the world's production. Total gold production recorded from Nevada from 1835 to 2017 totals 205,931,000 troy ounces (6,405.2 t), worth US$322.6 billion at 2020 values. Much of Nevada's gold production comes from large open pit mining using heap leaching recovery.

The Nevada mining industry supported an average 14,787 direct employees in 2018, with about 75,000 additional jobs related to providing goods and services needed by the mining industry. The average pay for mining industry employees during this time was $97,600 per year, the third highest average private employment sector in the state.

Major mining companies such as Newmont and Barrick Mining operate many of the state's gold mines. Active mines include those at Jerritt Canyon and the Carlin Trend.

Although Nevada was known much more for silver in the 19th century, many of the early silver mining districts also produced considerable quantities of gold. The Comstock Lode produced 8,600,000 troy ounces (270 t) of gold through 1959, and the Eureka district produced 1,200,000 troy ounces (37 t). The Robinson copper mine has produced well over 2,700,000 troy ounces (84 t) gold, along with over 4 billion pounds (1,500,000 tonnes) of copper.

== Carlin Trend ==
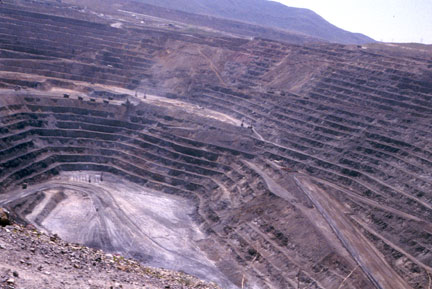
Goldstrike mine (Betz-Post) Mine in the Carlin Trend, the largest Carlin-type deposit in the world, has produced over 43 million ounces of gold in the past 30 years.

Gold was discovered in the vicinity of Carlin in Eureka County in the 1870s, but production was small. Glacier deposits were discovered in 1907, but the deposits were too small to cause much excitement. It was not until 1961 that Newmont discovered the large low-grade gold deposit at Carlin that the mining industry began to take notice. The Carlin mine began producing gold in 1965, but at a gold price of US$35 per troy ounce, ore grades were still too low to cause a rush to northern Nevada. It was not until the gold price escalated in the 1970s that mining companies began to target similar deposits.

The Carlin Trend, part of what is also known as the Carlin Unconformity, is 5 miles (8 km) wide and 40 miles (60 km) long running northwest–southeast, has since produced more gold than any other mining district in the United States. Production from the trend surpassed 50,000,000 troy ounces (1,600 t) of gold in 2002. The Carlin and other mines along the trend pioneered the method of open-pit mining with cyanide heap leach recovery that is today used at large low-grade gold mines worldwide.

New ore deposits are still being discovered and developed along the trend. The South Arturo deposit was discovered by Barrick Gold in 2005. The deposit contains an estimated 1,300,000 troy ounces (40 t) of gold.

== Goldfield ==
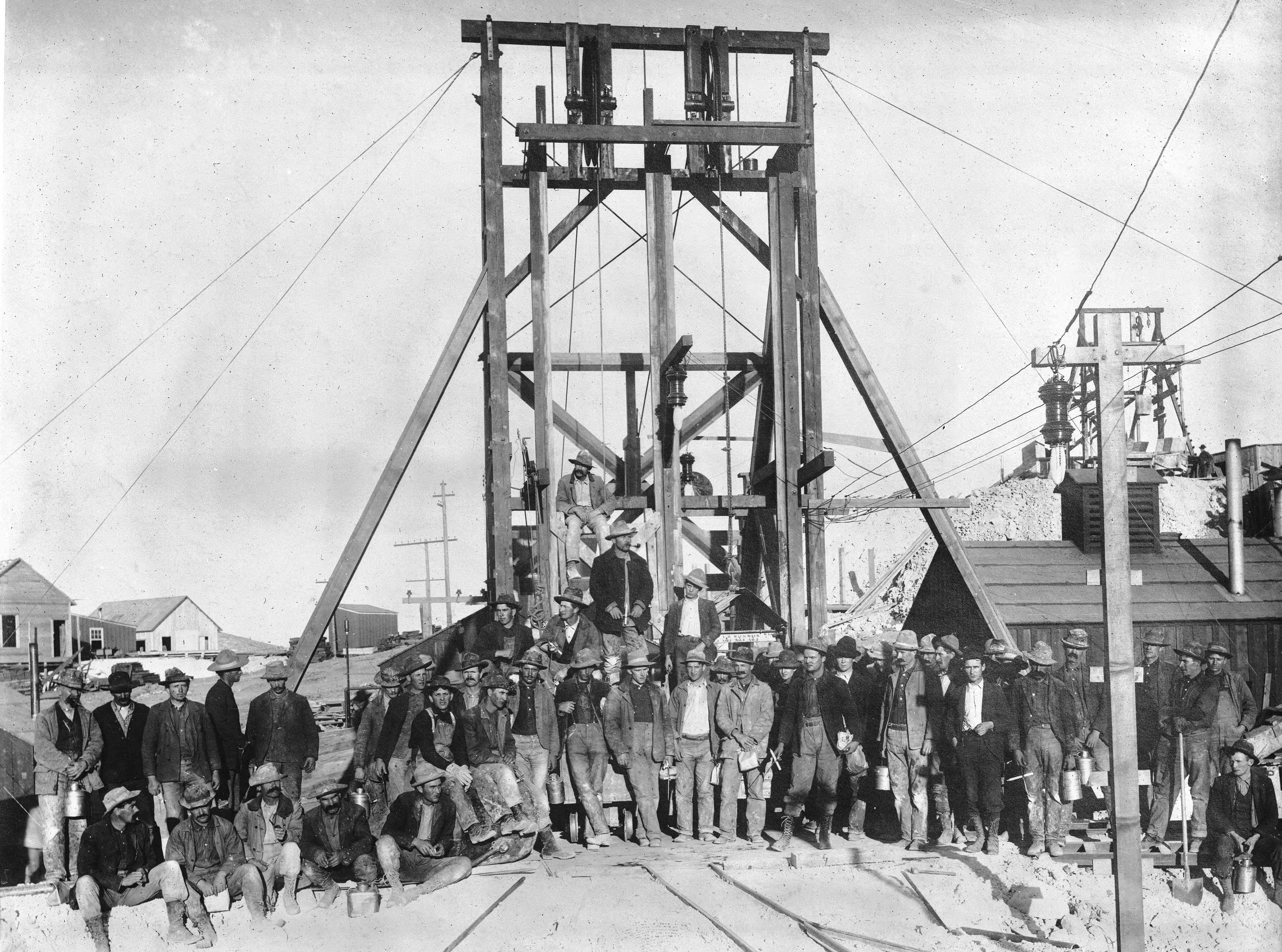
A group of miners pose in front of mine headframe in Goldfield c. 1905

Goldfield was discovered in 1902, and began major gold production in 1904. The ore occurs in altered shear zones in Tertiary dacite and andesite. Total gold production through 1959 was 4,200,000 troy ounces (130 t).

== Robinson/Ely ==
The Robinson district at Ely, Nevada produced about 3,000,000 troy ounces (93 t) of gold through 1990, as a byproduct of copper mining.

In 2017 the Robinson Mine produced 112,633,428 pounds of copper, 37,897 troy ounces of gold and 652,763 pounds of molybdenite with 617 employees.

== Gold royalties ==
All mineral and gold production on public and private lands in Nevada is subject to a Net Royalty payable to the State. The gross proceeds from the sale of minerals minus allowable deductions determine the taxable net proceeds. If the net proceeds from sales by a mine in the taxable year total $4 million or more, the tax rate is 5%. For less profitable mines the tax rate is graduated down to 2%. Miners' net proceeds are also subject to federal corporate income tax of 21%.

Because the NPM tax is an ad valorem property tax, the amount of the net proceeds times the property tax rate goes to the county where the mineral was extracted. Any additional amount of tax paid up to the 5% goes to the State.

In 2017-2018 the Nevada net proceeds royalty raised $155.1 million (down from $255.6 million in 2012) from gold and silver production, of which the counties received $87.5 million (down from $127 million in 2012).

== Gold Mining Companies in Nevada ==
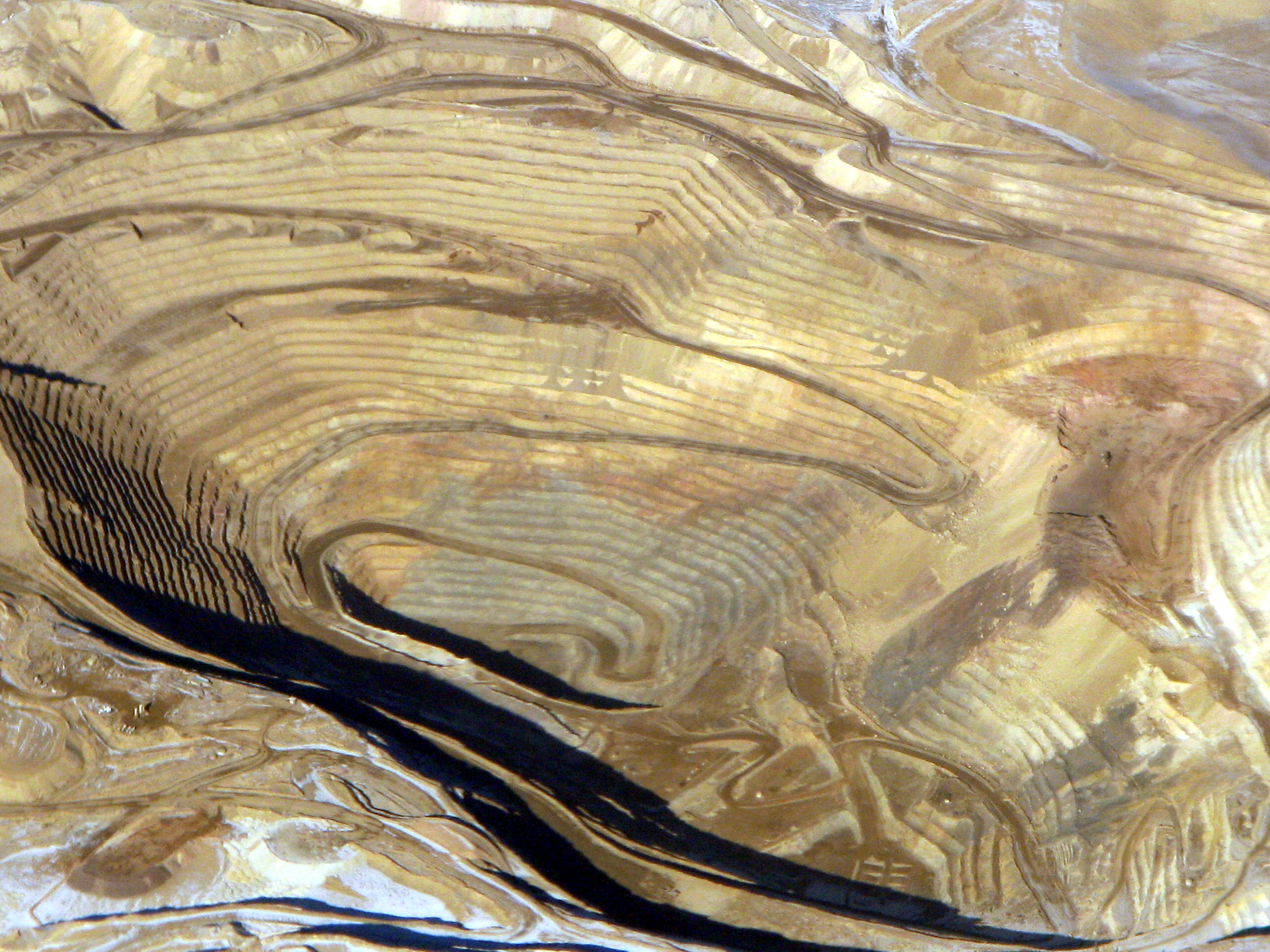
Aerial view of Round Mountain open pit, 2008.

- Barrick Gold
- Coeur Mining
- Hecla Mining
- KGHM Polska Miedź
- Kinross Gold
- Newmont
- SSR Mining
- Sprott Mining

== See also ==
- List of active gold mines in Nevada
- Bald Mountain mine
- Cortez Gold Mine
- Getchell Mine
- Goldstrike mine
- Marigold mine
- Nevada Gold Mines
- Robinson Mine
- Round Mountain Gold Mine
- Carlin–type gold deposit
- Gold mining in the United States
- Silver mining in Nevada
