= John Livermore =

John Sealy Livermore
- John Livermore in the field
- Born: April 16, 1918; San Francisco, California
- Died: February 7, 2013 (aged 94); Reno, Nevada
- Education: Stanford University, BA 1940
- Known for: Discovery of the Carlin gold deposit

John Sealy Livermore (April 16, 1918 – February 7, 2013) was an American geologist who discovered or helped to discover four major gold deposits in northern Nevada.

Livermore was born in San Francisco, California, and was descended from a pioneer California family with roots in Maine. An ancestor, Elijah Livermore, built a grist mill and a saw mill on the Androscoggin River in 1791. The town of Livermore Falls, Maine, is named after him.

His great-grandfather, Horatio Gates Livermore, came to California from Maine during the Gold Rush in 1850, and later became a California State Senator from Eldorado County. His great-grandfather and his grandfather, Horatio Putnam Livermore, who came to California in 1856, used their Maine mill experience to become involved in the earliest days of hydroelectric power, helping to build the original Folsom Dam. His father, Norman Banks Livermore was a founding board member of Pacific Gas and Electric. His mother, Caroline Sealy Livermore, was a conservationist in the San Francisco Bay Area, working on protection of the Marin Headlands and Richardson Bay. Mount Livermore on Angel Island is named after her. He had four brothers, environmentalist and timber executive Norman Livermore (1911-2006), Putnam Livermore, Robert Livermore and George Livermore.

The Carlin deposit, from which the current Nevada gold-mining industry grew, was his first discovery. In 1961, after reading an article by Ralph J. Roberts, Alignment of Mining Districts in North-Central Nevada, and then hearing a talk by Roberts, Livermore, then a Newmont Mining geologist, pursued Roberts' theory to track down the 4 million ounce gold ore body now known as the Carlin Mine. The entire Carlin Trend has now produced well over 50 million ounces of gold.

Carlin–type gold deposits are characterized by extremely fine-grained gold — gold that cannot be seen by the naked eye, nor concentrated by panning. Nevertheless, several small Carlin-type deposits were discovered in northern Nevada and worked as mines prior to the discovery of the Carlin orebody. John Livermore examined one such deposit at the Standard Mine near Lovelock, Nevada in the late 1940s and believed that other, possibly richer, "invisible gold" deposits remained to be found.

Guided by Ralph Roberts’ ideas, John Livermore and Alan Coope, a fellow Newmont geologist who had a strong background in geochemistry, began an intensive search for “invisible gold.” Success came quickly. In October 1961, they staked the claims that became the Carlin Mine.

Livermore then headed Newmont’s exploration effort in Canada in the 1960s. He returned to Nevada in 1971 to form Cordex Exploration. By 1970, only one other new gold mine, the Cortez mine near Crescent Valley, Nevada, had been discovered and developed in northern Nevada. Exploration had all but stopped. Livermore felt that a return to basic prospecting might lead to further discoveries.

Livermore hired Whit “Dee” DeLaMare, a mining engineer of long experience, to prospect on behalf of Cordex. DeLaMare’s work led to the discovery of the Pinson, Preble, Sterling, and Dee mines and development of the Getchell Trend, second only to the Carlin Trend in Nevada gold production. These successes and higher gold prices fueled a Nevada gold exploration boom during the 1980s. New gold mines were found and developed. Nevada gold production continues to expand.

Livermore remained active in geology, mineral exploration, and public service. He endowed a chair in Geophysics at the Mackay School of Mines, and supported major programs at Stanford University and the University of Nevada, Reno, usually anonymously. He died in Reno, Nevada, aged 94.

== See also ==
- Gold mining in Nevada
- Getchell Mine
