= Nevada State Route 278 =

State highway in Nevada, United States

State Route 278
- Eureka–Carlin Road

Route information
- Maintained by NDOT
- Length: 87.572 mi (140.933 km)
- Existed: 1976–present
- History: Part of SR 20 by 1929, changed to SR 51 by 1965; Became SR 278 in 1976

Major junctions
- South end: US 50 near Eureka
- North end: I-80 in Carlin

Location
- Country: United States
- State: Nevada
- Counties: Eureka, Elko

Highway system
- Nevada State Highway System; Interstate; US; State; Pre‑1976; Scenic
← SR 267	→ SR 289

State Route 278 (SR 278) is a state highway in Nevada. It runs from U.S. Route 50 (US 50) near Eureka north to Interstate 80 (I-80) in Carlin.

== Route description ==
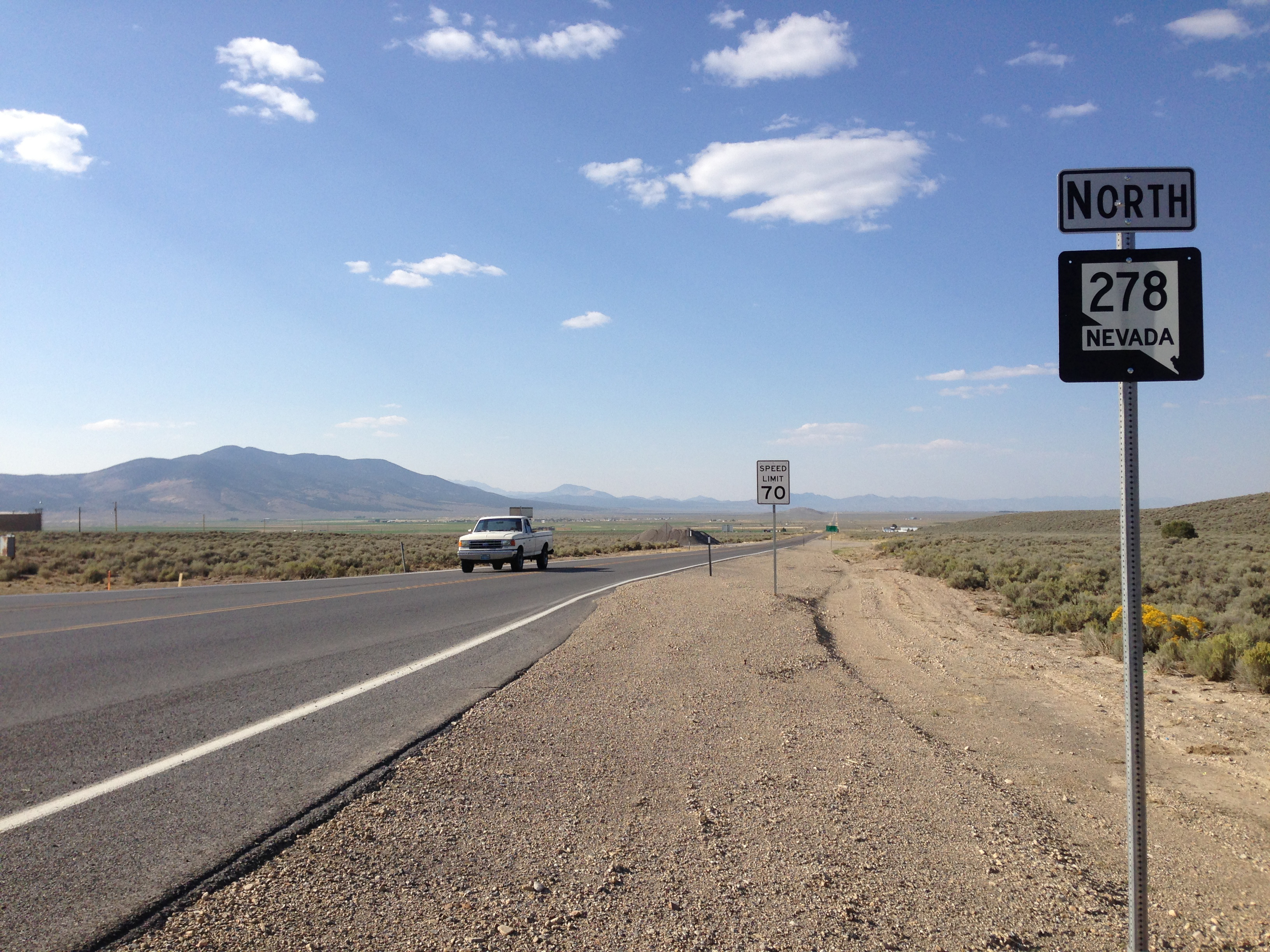
View north along State Route 278 at the southern end, near Eureka, September 2014

State Route 278 begins at a junction with US 50, about 3 miles (4.8 km) north-northwest of Eureka in southern Eureka County. The highway heads north-northwest from there, passing by the Eureka Airport and going through Diamond Valley. After about 15 miles (24 km), SR 278 curves westward to run between the Whistler and Sulphur Springs Ranges, turning north and cresting Garden Pass to enter Garden Valley.

SR 278 continues heading northward, eventually entering Pine Valley. After several miles, the highway shifts slightly more eastward as it approaches the Cortez Mountains and the Pinon Range. The route follows a creek northwestward, then curves to follow the path of the Humboldt River and Union Pacific Railroad northeastward. The route enters Elko County and soon after enters the city of Carlin. State Route 278 ends on the western edge of Carlin at West Carlin interchange on I-80 (exit 279).

== History ==
SR 278 originated as State Route 20 and was later renumbered State Route 51

A route approximating the alignment of Eureka–Carlin Road appeared on state highway maps as a narrow, unimproved roadway as early as 1927. By 1929, this road had been designated as State Route 20, and was shown to parallel the Eureka and Palisade Railroad connecting Eureka to State Route 1/US 40 (today's I-80) further west of Carlin via Palisade. SR 20 was mostly upgraded to a gravel road by 1946. Except for the portion between Palisade and US 40, the road was completely paved by 1956—a road connecting just south of Palisade directly to Carlin (approximating today's alignment of the northernmost reaches of SR 278) was also paved by this time. The Eureka–Carlin road portion of SR 20 was renumbered as part of State Route 51 by 1965.

The Eureka–Carlin road remained unchanged for several years after being renumbered to SR 51. However, the Nevada Department of Transportation began renumbering its state highways in the mid 1970s. On July 1, 1976, the road was renumbered again, to State Route 278, the designation it carries today. The number change was first seen on official state highway maps in 1978. The route has remain substantially unchanged since then.

== Major intersections ==
Note: Mileposts in Nevada reset at county lines; the start and end mileposts for each county are given in the county column

County	Location	mi	km	Destinations	Notes
Eureka; 0.000–82.603		0.000	0.000	Home Stake Road south	Dirt road continues beyond southern terminus
Eureka; 0.000–82.603		0.000	0.000	US 50 west (Lincoln Highway) – Carson City US 50 east (Lincoln Highway) – Eureka, Ely	Southern terminus
Elko; 0.000–4.969	Carlin			I-80 BL east / SR 221 east (Chestnut Street)	
Elko; 0.000–4.969	Carlin	4.969	7.997	I-80 west – Reno I-80 east – Elko	Northern terminus; Diamond interchange, I-80 Exit 279
Elko; 0.000–4.969	Carlin	4.969	7.997	James Creek Road north	Dirt road continues beyond northern terminus
1.000 mi = 1.609 km; 1.000 km = 0.621 mi

== See also ==
- List of state highways in Nevada
