= Nevada Gold Mines =

Mining company

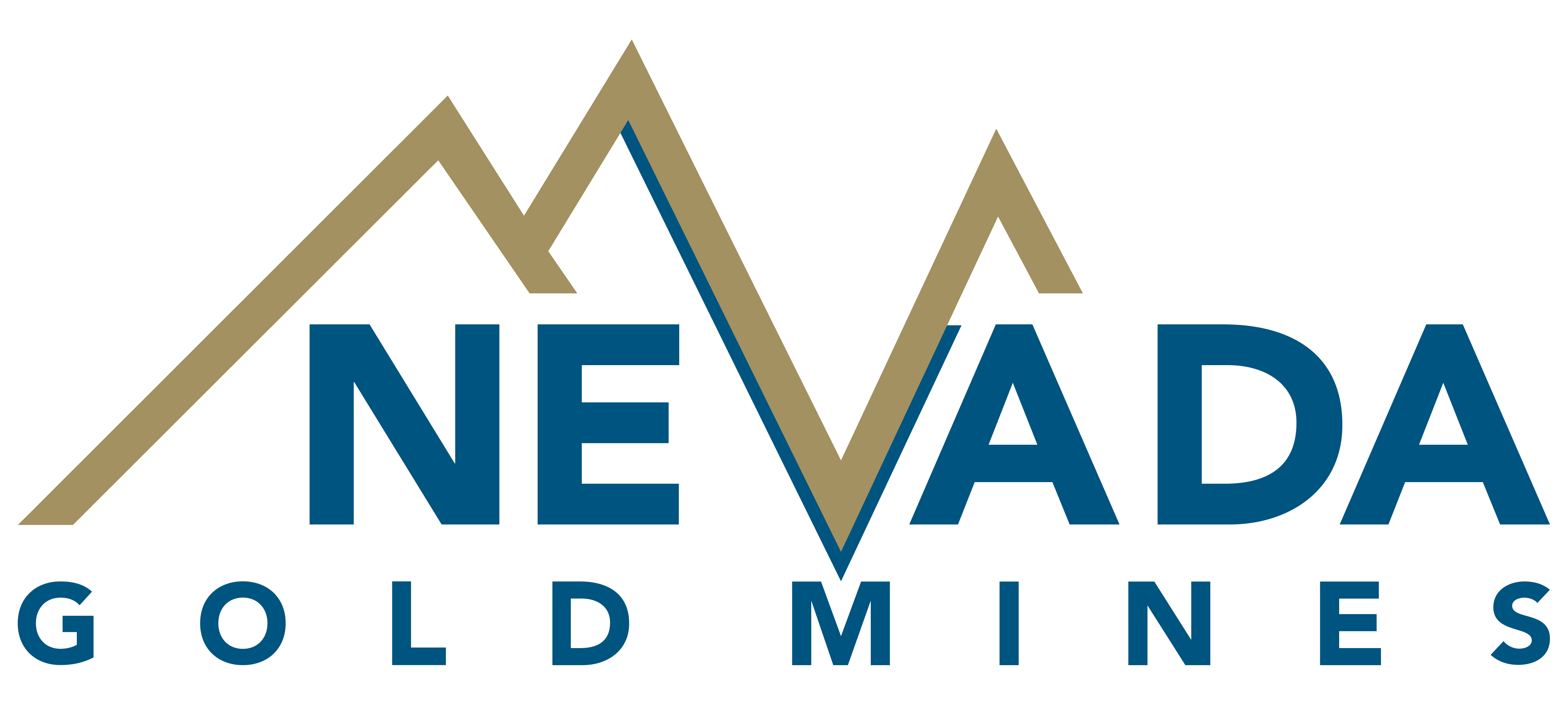
- Type: Joint Venture
- Industry: Mining
- Founded: 2019; 7 years ago
- Headquarters: Elko, Nevada, United States
- Products: Metal mining
- Number of employees: 7,000 (2020)
- Parent: Barrick Gold (61.5%); Newmont (38.5%)
- Website: nevadagoldmines.com

Nevada Gold Mines is an American gold mining company that was formed on July 1, 2019, as a joint venture between Barrick Gold (61.5% ownership) and Newmont (38.5% ownership) through the combination of their significant gold mining assets across northern Nevada. The assets in Nevada Gold Mines include 10 underground mines and 12 surface mines as well as related facilities.

Barrick Gold is the operator of Nevada Gold Mines. In 2023, they started to install 200 MW of Ohio made solar panels. The solar panels were installed and operational by 2024.

== History ==
Barrick and Newmont announced an implementation agreement to create the Nevada joint venture on March 11, 2019. Nevada Gold Mines was officially launched on July 1, 2019, as Nevada Gold Mines LLC.

At announcement, the companies stated that the combined Nevada operations had produced about 4.1 million ounces of gold in 2018 (prior to the launch of the joint venture).

In August 2024, Barrick announced completion of a second phase of a 200-megawatt solar power plant at Nevada Gold Mines and stated that the solar facility had the capacity to produce about 17% of NGM's annual power demand. In a November 2024 results release, Barrick further stated that the solar project was expected to reduce carbon dioxide equivalent emissions by 234 kilotonnes per year and to reduce NGM's total annual greenhouse gas emissions by 8% against a 2018 baseline.

== Ownership and governance ==
Nevada Gold Mines is owned 61.5% by Barrick and 38.5% by Newmont, with Barrick designated as operator.

A technical report filed with the U.S. Securities and Exchange Commission describes a joint venture board in which Barrick has the right to appoint three members and Newmont two members. The same filing describes arrangements including pro-rata purchase of refined doré by the owners and retained royalties granted in connection with the venture's formation.

In May 2025, Barrick Gold Corporation completed a corporate name change to Barrick Mining Corporation.

== Mining operations ==
Nevada Gold Mines operates open-pit and underground gold mines and associated processing facilities in northern Nevada, organized into the Carlin, Cortez, Turquoise Ridge and Phoenix operations. Barrick, as operator, reports Carlin, Cortez and Turquoise Ridge as separate operating segments. Barrick's 61.5% share of the joint venture's gold production was 1.59 million ounces in 2025, compared with 1.65 million ounces in 2024. On a 100% basis, the joint venture produced 2.68 million ounces in 2024. Newmont reported attributable production of 999,000 ounces from its 38.5% interest in 2025. Barrick's 2026 guidance for its share of production is 1.42 to 1.58 million ounces.

Nevada Gold Mines operations (production is Barrick's 61.5% share, in thousands of ounces of gold)
Operation	Location	Principal mines and deposits	Processing	2024	2025	2026 guidance
Carlin Complex	Elko and Eureka counties	Goldstrike, Gold Quarry, Leeville, South Arturo, Rain/Emigrant, Goldstar, and the Pete Bajo, Exodus, El Nino and Rita K portal mines	Goldstrike roaster and autoclave, Gold Quarry roaster, North and South leach areas	775	687	600–670
Cortez Complex	Lander and Eureka counties	Cortez Pits, Crossroads, Pipeline, Cortez Hills underground, Goldrush underground	Cortez oxide mill, heap leaches; refractory ore processed at Carlin	444	454	430–480
Turquoise Ridge Complex	Humboldt County	Turquoise Ridge underground, Vista underground, Mega and Vista open pits	Sage autoclave, Juniper oxide plant	304	341	300–330
Phoenix	Lander County, south of Battle Mountain	Bonanza and Fortitude open pits	Phoenix mill, heap leach, copper SX/EW plant	127	109	80–100
Total				1,650	1,591	1,420–1,580

Figures exclude Long Canyon, which is on care and maintenance. Production and guidance are from Barrick's annual information form and MD&A.

=== Carlin Complex ===
The Carlin Complex lies along the Carlin Trend in Elko and Eureka counties and was formed when Barrick's Goldstrike and Newmont's Carlin operations were combined into the joint venture in 2019. It includes open pits at Goldstrike, Gold Quarry, Goldstar (part of the Genesis/Tri-Star pits), Rain/Emigrant and South Arturo, which returned to production in December 2022, and underground operations at Goldstrike, Leeville and the Carlin portal mines. Ore is processed at the Goldstrike roaster and autoclave and the Gold Quarry roaster, with oxide and lower-grade ore treated on the North and South leach areas; the Gold Quarry concentrator (formerly Mill 5) is inactive. The complex also processes refractory ore from other joint venture operations.

Carlin produced 687,000 ounces attributable to Barrick in 2025 (2024: 775,000), below its guidance range, which Barrick attributed mainly to a slower-than-planned ramp-up of the Gold Quarry roaster and delayed access to higher-grade underground zones because of poor ground conditions. The shortfall was partly offset by additional high-grade ore shipped from Cortez for processing at the Carlin roasters. Barrick expects 600,000 to 670,000 ounces in 2026.

Ren is a new deposit at Goldstrike underground, north of the Meikle and Banshee deposits, and a key expansion project at Carlin. Barrick has estimated that it would average about 140,000 ounces a year (contained, 100% basis) once in full production, at an estimated capital cost of US$410 million to US$470 million (100% basis).

=== Cortez Complex ===
The Cortez Complex is about 100 km (62 mi) southwest of Elko in Lander and Eureka counties. The original Cortez mine went into production in 1969, and the Cortez Hills deposit was announced in April 2003. Barrick obtained its interest through its 2006 acquisition of Placer Dome and consolidated 100% ownership in 2008 by buying Kennecott's interest, before contributing Cortez to the joint venture in 2019. The complex comprises the Cortez Pits, Crossroads and Pipeline open pits and the Cortez Hills and Goldrush underground mines, with the Gold Acres and Robertson deposits also reported in its resource base. Gold is recovered at the Cortez oxide mill and on heap leach pads, while refractory ore is sent to the Carlin roasters.

Cortez produced 454,000 ounces attributable to Barrick in 2025 (2024: 444,000), in the upper half of its guidance range, helped by refractory ore processed at the Carlin roasters and the Goldstrike autoclave. Guidance for 2026 is 430,000 to 480,000 ounces.

Barrick includes Goldrush within Cortez. It describes Goldrush as an underground mine expected to produce more than 400,000 ounces a year (100% basis) once in full production by 2028, for an initial capital cost of about US$1 billion (100% basis); project spending was US$517 million as of June 30, 2026. Goldrush ore was already being mined and processed at the Carlin roasters during the ramp-up, and Barrick reported record underground tonnes mined at Cortez in the second quarter of 2026 as Goldrush ramped up. An employee at the Goldrush underground mine sustained fatal injuries on September 29, 2025.

=== Turquoise Ridge Complex ===
The Turquoise Ridge Complex in Humboldt County combines the former Turquoise Ridge mine, in which Barrick held 75% and Newmont 25% before the joint venture, with Newmont's Twin Creeks mine. Mining is carried out at the Turquoise Ridge and Vista underground mines and at the Mega and Vista open pits, and ore is processed at the Sage autoclave and the Juniper oxide plant.

Turquoise Ridge produced 341,000 ounces attributable to Barrick in 2025 (2024: 304,000), at the top of its guidance range after improvements to the processing plant and mining efficiency in the second half of the year. Barrick expects 300,000 to 330,000 ounces in 2026 because of lower underground grades under the mine sequence. In the second quarter of 2026 the underground mine achieved its best quarterly development rates since the joint venture was formed.

=== Phoenix ===
Phoenix is an open-pit mine south of Battle Mountain in Lander County, mining the Bonanza and Fortitude deposits. It was acquired by Newmont through its merger with Battle Mountain Gold and began operations in 2006. Phoenix has a mill and heap leach, and recovers copper as a by-product through a copper leach pad and solvent extraction–electrowinning plant. It produced 109,000 ounces attributable to Barrick in 2025 (2024: 127,000), and Barrick expects 80,000 to 100,000 ounces in 2026.

=== Former and inactive operations ===
Newmont developed the Long Canyon mine in Elko County, on the east side of the Pequop Mountains, after acquiring the project through its 2012 purchase of Fronteer Gold. It began operating in 2016. Long Canyon transitioned to care and maintenance at the end of 2023 and continues to produce residual ounces from its leach pad. In 2024 the joint venture decided not to pursue permitting for a second phase of mining, and Barrick later decided to place the mine into closure and removed its mineral resources from its reserves statement. Newmont's Lone Tree property, which was contributed to the joint venture in 2019, was divested in 2021 as part of an asset exchange with i-80 Gold.

=== Development projects ===
==== Robertson ====
Robertson is a planned open-pit mine in the Shoshone Range of Lander County, on the northern side of the Cortez district. In November 2024 the U.S. Bureau of Land Management signed a record of decision approving the project, covering about 5,990 acres. The approved plan provides for three open pits over about 12 years, using some facilities shared with Cortez. The joint venture classes Robertson as an emerging "Tier Two" asset, and Barrick has said it expected first production in 2027, subject to permitting.

==== Fourmile, Fiberline and Mike ====
Fourmile is a gold project wholly owned by Barrick, adjacent to Goldrush. Under the 2019 agreement that created the venture, Fourmile and Newmont's Fiberline and Mike projects were excluded from it pending a determination of their commercial feasibility. At the end of 2025, Fourmile's declared resource was 2.6 million ounces of indicated resources, and 13 million ounces of inferred resources at 16.9 grams per tonne, double the previous year's figure. A preliminary economic assessment published in September 2025 outlined a conceptual underground mine with an indicative capital cost of about US$1.5 billion to US$1.7 billion and gold production of about 600,000 to 750,000 ounces a year. Barrick budgeted US$70 million of capital in 2026 for construction and decline commencement at dedicated twin portals northwest of the deposit.

On August 10, 2026, Barrick and Newmont entered into a second amended and restated limited liability company agreement for Nevada Gold Mines LLC. Under it, Fourmile, Fiberline and Mike are to be contributed to the joint venture simultaneously, and Newmont is to pay Barrick US$1.95 billion in cash within 30 days of the Fourmile contribution. The agreement also changes how future contributions of development and exploration properties are valued and amends governance approval rights relating to the venture's senior leadership, and the companies entered into a confidential settlement of all outstanding disputes relating to the venture. Newmont expected the contributions to be completed in the fourth quarter of 2026, after which it would hold a 38.5% interest in Fourmile.

== See also ==
- Gold mining in Nevada
- List of active gold mines in Nevada
