= Cortez Gold Mine =

Gold mining and processing facility in Nevada, US

Cortez
- Location in Nevada
- Location: Lander County & Eureka County, Nevada; 40°14′45″N 116°42′40″W
- Production: 963,000 oz Au in 2019
- Financial year: 2019
- Opened: 1862
- Company: Barrick Mining (61.5%), Newmont (38.5%)
- Website: Barrick - Cortez property
- Acquired: 2006 (60%); 2008 (100%)

Cortez Gold Mine is a large gold mining and processing facility in Lander and Eureka County, Nevada, United States, located approximately 63 miles (100 km) southwest of Elko. It is owned as a joint venture between Barrick Mining (61.5%) and Newmont (38.5%), operated by Barrick, and comprises the Pipeline, Crossroads, and Cortez Hills open pit mines; and the Cortez Hills underground mine. Ore from the mines is treated at an oxide mill at the site and on leach pads, while refractory ore is shipped to Barrick’s Goldstrike operation for processing.

== Region history ==
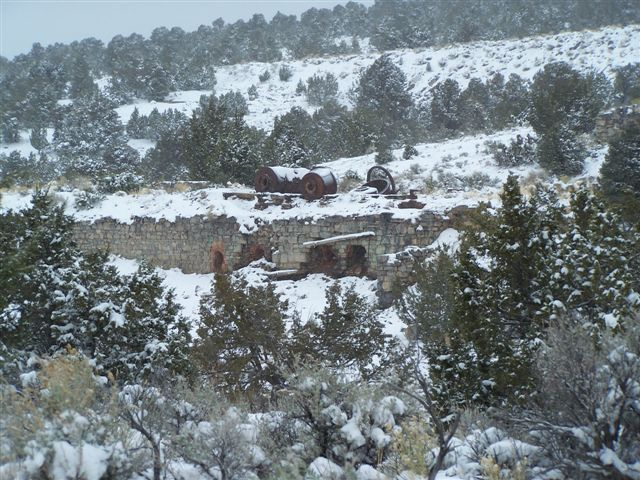
Abandoned mill in the Cortez Gold Mine Complex at the ghost town of Cortez, Nevada

The Cortez Mountains have been mined since 1862, with silver being the primary commodity until the 1940s. The Gold Acres operation in the Cortez Mountains included open pit and underground mines in the 1930s and 1940s. Cortez Gold opened in 1968 and production ended in 1976. The United States Bureau of Mines built a pilot plant in 1969 which would make heap leaching for gold commercially viable by 1971. The low grade ore and dump material from the Gold Acres operation was then heap leached. The Cortez mill was reopened as the price of gold increased in the early 1980s, feed for the mill was provided by the nearby Horse Canyon deposit between 1983 and 1987. Further exploration of the region was carried out by Cortez Joint Venture which involved Placer Dome and Kenecott ( at the time Kenecott was a BP Minerals subsidiary). The result of the joint venture's exploration was the 1991 discovery of the Pipeline orebody. The Pipeline orebody was located near the Gold Acres operation, instead of being located in the foothills, it was entirely within the Crescent Valley. The Pipeline orebody was much larger than the original orebodies in the region. The entire Pipeline complex contained 23 million ounces of gold between the original orebodies, the Pipeline orebody and the later discoveries of South Pipeline, Crossroads and Gap. The Cortez Joint Venture built the Pipeline Mine and mill in early 1996 following a series of ownership disputes with junior mining companies. Commissioning of the Pipeline mine cost US$250 million, and resulted an annual output between 1998 and 2005 of over one million ounces of gold per year. The Cortez Hills deposit was discovered in 2002, underground development to define the resource limits began in 2006. Barrick Gold acquired 60% in Cortez in 2006 when it purchased Placer Dome for US$10.4 billion, and acquired the remaining 40% from Rio Tinto in March 2008 for US$1.7 billion.

== Geology ==
The Cortez Mine is located in the Crescent Valley which is between the Shoshone and Cortez Mountains, a basin in the traditional Basin and Range setting of Nevada. Precious metal mineralization came during Jurassic-Miocene periods. The Pipeline complex lies within 600 feet (183 m) of silty limestone in what is called the Silurian Roberts Mountain Formation. Above this is Devonian Wenban Limestone, which acts as the host rock of the Cortez Hills deposit. Above the Devonian Limestone is Quaternary alluvium.

== Mining operations ==
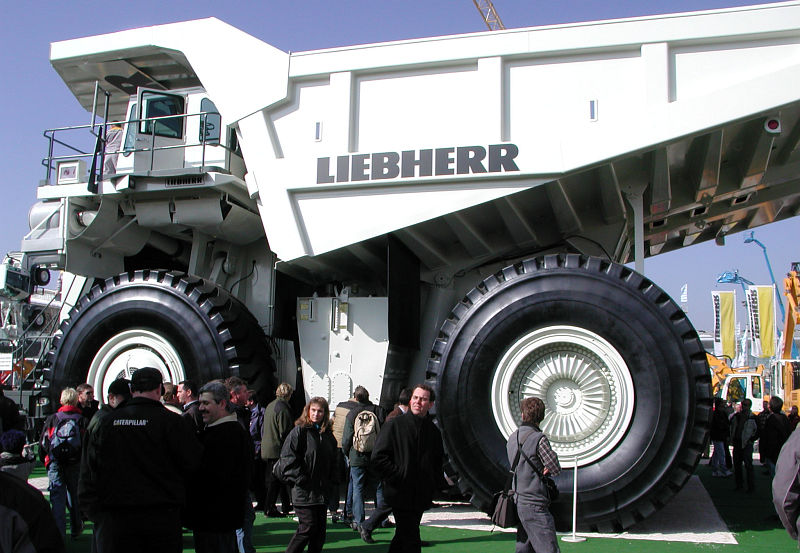
A Liebherr T 282 B 400-ton truck—the same model in operation at the open pits at Cortez

The Pipeline and South Pipeline deposits are currently being mined using traditional open pit mining techniques, while the Cortez Hills deposit will be mined out using both open pit and underground mining techniques.

=== Surface ===
Current haulage rates at Cortez are 350,000–400,000 short tons (320,000–360,000 t) per day of combined ore and waste, and will increase with the commissioning of the Cortez Hills open pit. Cortez currently has an average stripping ratio of 3:1. Ore in the open pit mines is hauled on surface using 400-short-ton (360 t) Liebherr T 282 B trucks. Cortez currently owns 24 T282Bs, which accounts for 10% of the total sales of T282 & T282B trucks worldwide.

=== Underground ===
The underground operation at Cortez Hills utilizes parallel 16 feet (4.9 m) wide by 18 feet (5.5 m) high, 10,000 feet (3,050 m) declines. Crosscuts connect the declines every 500 feet (150 m), the ramps are driven at a grade of 6% for their entirety. The declines are used to haul ore from the stopes to surface and to provide ventilation for the mining operation. The declines are accessed via portals on the wall of an old open pit, the haulage (west) decline brings fresh air into the mine and the east decline exhausts air to surface.

The declines and lateral development utilize welded wire mesh and shotcrete with swellex bolts for ground support. Open stopes will be backfilled with waste rock from the open pit hauled down the decline by empty ore trucks return from surface and mixed with cement underground. Barrick's Goldstrike Mine utilizes paste backfill, which is an alternative for Cortez in the future which may simplify the backfill process. Once the mine is in full operation it is estimated to have up to twelve production faces in operation producing 1,200 short tons (1,100 t) per day of ore in 2009.

== Processing operations ==
=== Pipeline deposits ===
Processing of ore from the Pipeline deposits is done by either cyanide heap leaching or milling at the Pipeline mill. Low grade open pit ore is heap leached without further crushing at one of the two leach pads currently in operation. The larger leach pad is 3.6 million ft^{2} (362,000m^{2}) with a 20,000 US gal/min (1,250 L/s) flow rate. The smaller pad is connected to the Pipeline mill and has a flow rate of 6,000 US gal/min (375 L/s). Higher grade ore is processed at the Pipeline mill utilizing CIC/CIL (carbon in column/carbon in leach).

=== Cortez Hills deposit ===
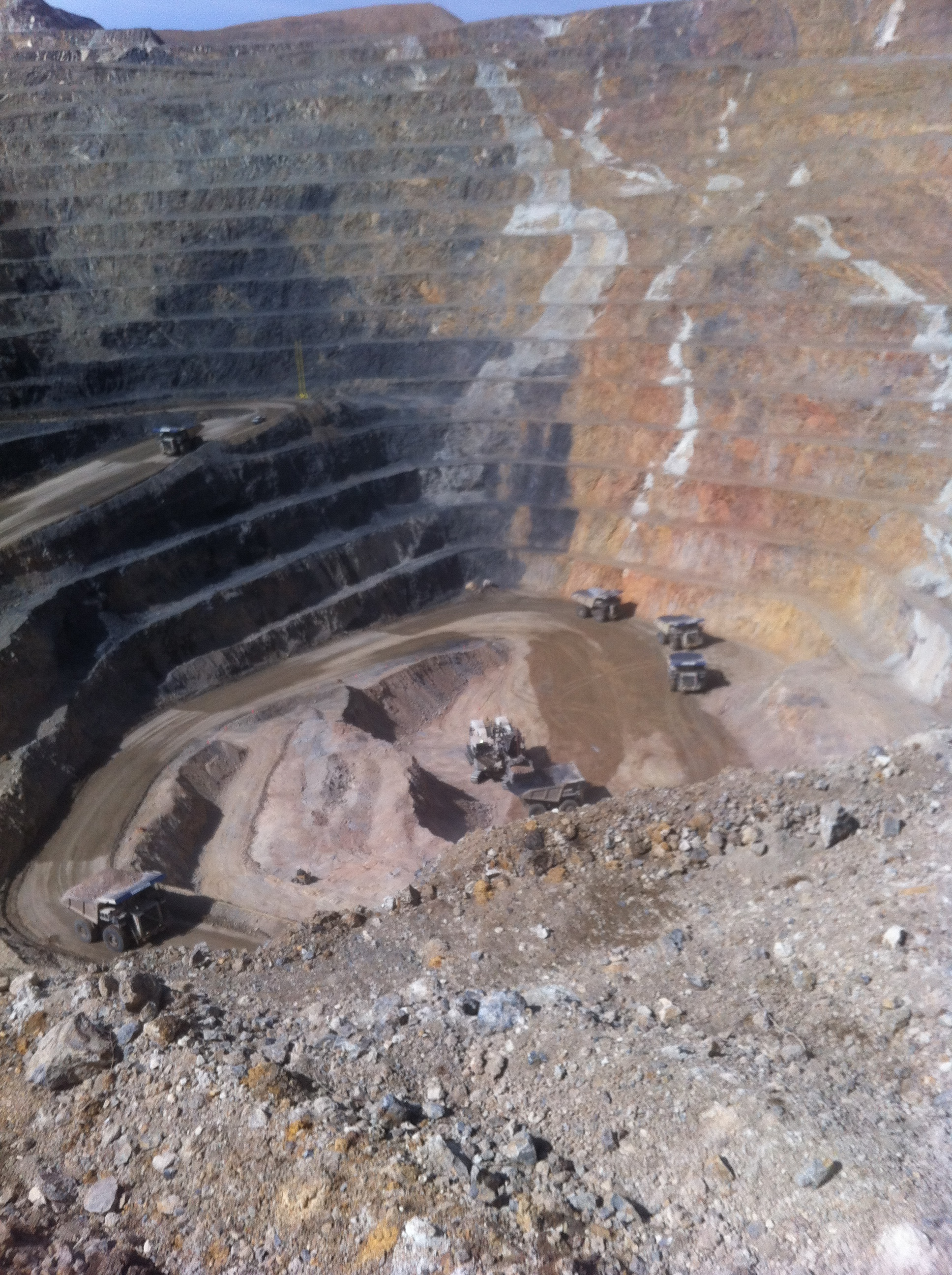
Cortez Hills pit in 2013.

Low grade ore from open pit at the Cortez Hills deposit will be heap leached at dedicated heap leach pads at Cortez Hills site, while ore from the underground mine will be mixed with higher grade open pit and will be sent 10 miles (16 km) to the Pipeline mill via the largest overland conveyor in Nevada.

== Environmental and social issues ==
=== Environment ===
In order to bring the Cortez Hills Mine into operation, Barrick will have to move a road that runs through the Cortez Canyon which will cost US$15 million. Barrick will reforest hillsides that were clearcut in the 1800s and remove an obsolete roaster that has not been utilized since the 1980s. Working with the United States Bureau of Land Management and the Nevada Department of Wildlife Cortez has already revegetated some of their old waste dumps by placing alluvium over the waste rock and planting local vegetation in the area

=== Water ===
Northern Nevada has a limited supply of surface water which is considered a precious commodity, however large amounts of water can be found underground. At the Pipeline, pit water is pumped from aquifers where it is pumped to ranch land to be reintroduced into the groundwater supply. The mine keeps two streams of water, a contact water stream in which the water has come into contact with the mining operation, and a non-contact water stream where the water has not come into contact with the mining operation. The contact water stream is recycled and reused in the mining operation where the noncontact water is pumped off site.

=== Native Americans ===
The Timbisha Shoshone Tribe are calling for a stop to the Cortez Hills expansion, saying the damage that will be done to the land is irreversible and prevents the use of the lands for religious purposes. Barrick had taken part in a collaborative agreement with leaders of the four remaining Shoshone Tribes.

A preliminary injunction requested by Western Shoshone activists was placed on Barrick to prevent the company from developing the Cortez Hills Mine expansion. Although the request was denied at the district level, a preliminary injunction was issued by the 9th Circuit, which could stop the project completely if the judge determines the project would cause the environment irreversible damage and restrict the religious freedom of the Western Shoshone. The focal point is Mount Tenabo (which Barrick would be mining the flank of, should the Cortez Hills Mine proceed as planned) and whether it is significant to the Western Shoshone culture as claimed. Barrick lawyers maintain that Mount Tenabo has been mined since 1862.

== See also ==
- Gold mining in Nevada
- List of active gold mines in Nevada
