= Cortez, Nevada =

- Ghost town
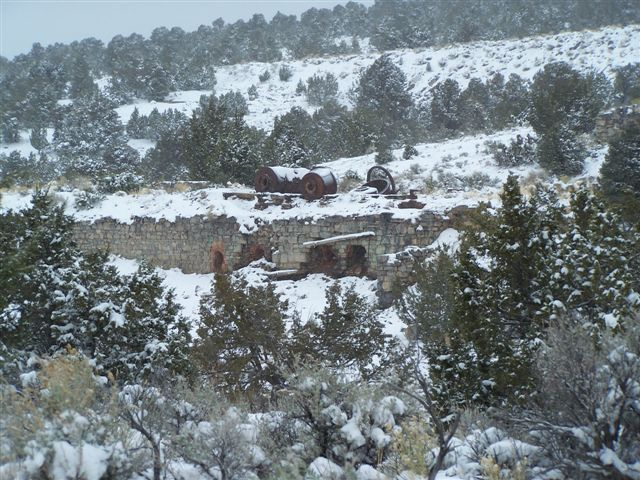

- Location within the state of Nevada Cortez (the United States)
- Coordinates: 40°08′28″N 116°36′12″W
- Country: United States
- State: Nevada
- County: Lander
- Time zone: UTC-8 (Pacific (PST))
  - Summer (DST): UTC-7 (PDT)

Cortez is a ghost town in Lander County, in the U.S. state of Nevada. The GNIS classifies it as a populated place.

== History ==
Located near Mount Tenabo, Cortez first attracted attention in 1862, when Mexican miners transported silver ore from the site to stamp mills in Austin, 80 miles (130 km) south. In the spring of 1863, a group of eight miners exploring the area, came across Native Americans collecting silver in gulleys southwest of the Mount Tenabo mountains. Investigating the source of the silver ore, the group climbed the rock face above, and located the ledges of silver. The discovery led to the organization of the Cortez district.

A few months later, roads were constructed from the town site to the mining area. Machinery to build an eight-stamp mill in town was transported from California. The community was named after Hernán Cortés, the 16th-century Spanish conquistador.

In 1864, Simon Wenban, one of the original eight miners, and George Hearst, father of William Randolph Hearst, became mining partners. Hearst sold his shares in the partnership in 1867, when the miners encountered problems that slowed operations. By 1870, Wenban had enlarged the mill in town, and was employing Chinese miners because they were willing to work for lower wages than American and Mexican workers. For the next 20 years, the mining district was profitable. A fifty-ton leaching plant was built in 1886, and ran continuously until the mid-1890s.

Cortez thrived until the depression of the 1930s. A post office was in operation at Cortez intermittently between 1868 and 1943.

In 1969, the Cortez Gold Mine was established in Cortez.

== See also ==
- Cortez Gold Mine
- List of ghost towns in Nevada
