= Dakota Gold Corp =

American gold mining company

Dakota Gold Corp.
- Homestake Gold Mine in 1877
- Formerly: Dakota Territory Resource Corp
- Company type: Public company
- Traded as: NYSE: DC
- Industry: Mining
- Predecessor: Homestake Mining Company
- Founded: April 9, 1876; 149 years ago in Homestake Mine
- Founder: George Hearst, Lloyd Tevis, and James Ben Ali Haggin,
- Headquarters: Lead, South Dakota, United States
- Area served: United States and Canada
- Products: Gold mining
- Number of employees: 41 plus 50 consultants and contractors (2023)
- Website: dakotagoldcorp.com

Dakota Gold Corp is an American gold mining company that owns land in the historic Homestake District of the northern Black Hills of South Dakota.

The area once produced the second largest amount of gold in U.S. history. Otherwise known as the Homestake Mine or the Homestake Deposit, the 100-square-mile area yielded approximately 44 million ounces of gold in its 136-year-history, placing it second in U.S. gold production only to the Carlin District of northeast Nevada, and ranking it the largest iron-formation-hosted gold deposit in the world. Mining was halted in 2002 but the company re-opened the mine around 2014. The company was formerly known as Dakota Territory Resource Corp and changed its name in 2022 to Dakota Gold Corp after a merger with JR Resources Corp.

The total mineral area that the company owns covers 3,057 acres, including: the Blind Gold, City Creek, and Homestake Paleoplacer Properties.

== History ==
During the Gold Rush of the late 19th century, brothers Fred and Moses Manuel and their partners, Alex Engh and Hank Harney, staked out an area in the northern Black Hills of what was then considered Dakota Territory (today Lead, South Dakota). On April 9, 1876, they discovered there an outcropping of a vein of ore, and quickly claimed the property theirs, naming it the "Homestake". Soon other miners followed suit, seeing great gold potential, and a town was built around the Homestake.

A year later, three entrepreneurs, George Hearst (father of the famous newspaper tycoon William Randolph Hearst), Lloyd Tevis, and James Ben Ali Haggin, bought the Homestake from them for $70,000, and founded the Homestake Mining Company. Because of the remote location, mining equipment had to be brought in from Nebraska, but eventually a mill began crushing ore in July 1878. A year later, the three partners sold shares in the Homestake Mining Company, listing it on the New York Stock Exchange (NYSE), which would become one of the longest-listed stocks in the history of the NYSE (NYSE:HM).

During the 1980s and 1990s, Richard Bachman, geologist, president and director of Dakota Territory Resource Corp, managed a team for Homestake Mining Company that was successful in uncovering and expanding new significant gold mineralization areas. While the mining at the Homestake Mine halted in 2002 due to low gold prices and high mining expenses, from 2011-2014, Dakota Territory Resource Corp acquired crucial sample data as well as mineral acres, broadening its property position in the Homestake District in efforts to restart a gold revitalization there similar to what was done two to three decades earlier. In a venture to continue exploration and development of this precious metals site, Dakota Territory Resource Corp breathed new life into this once-profitable gold mining area. They cited a commitment to exploration of gold with sustainable practices.

In 2022 the company merged with JR Resources Corp to form the renamed company Dakota Gold Corp which was listed on the New York stock exchange.

== Management Team ==
Richard Bachman, president and director, previously worked for 22 years at Homestake Mining Company in various capacities including regional geologist, managing an exploration program focused on the discovery of a repeat of the Homestake Mine. Gerald Aberle, vice president, COO, and director, also worked for 22 years with Homestake Mining Company, at the Homestake gold mine in Lead, South Dakota. He also consulted for 14 years with Homestake Mining Co. as well as Barrick Gold Corp. Wm Chris Mathers is CFO, and Anthony Kamin is director.
