= North Valmy Generating Station =

Power station in Nevada, United States

Coordinates: 40°52′50″N 117°9′8″W

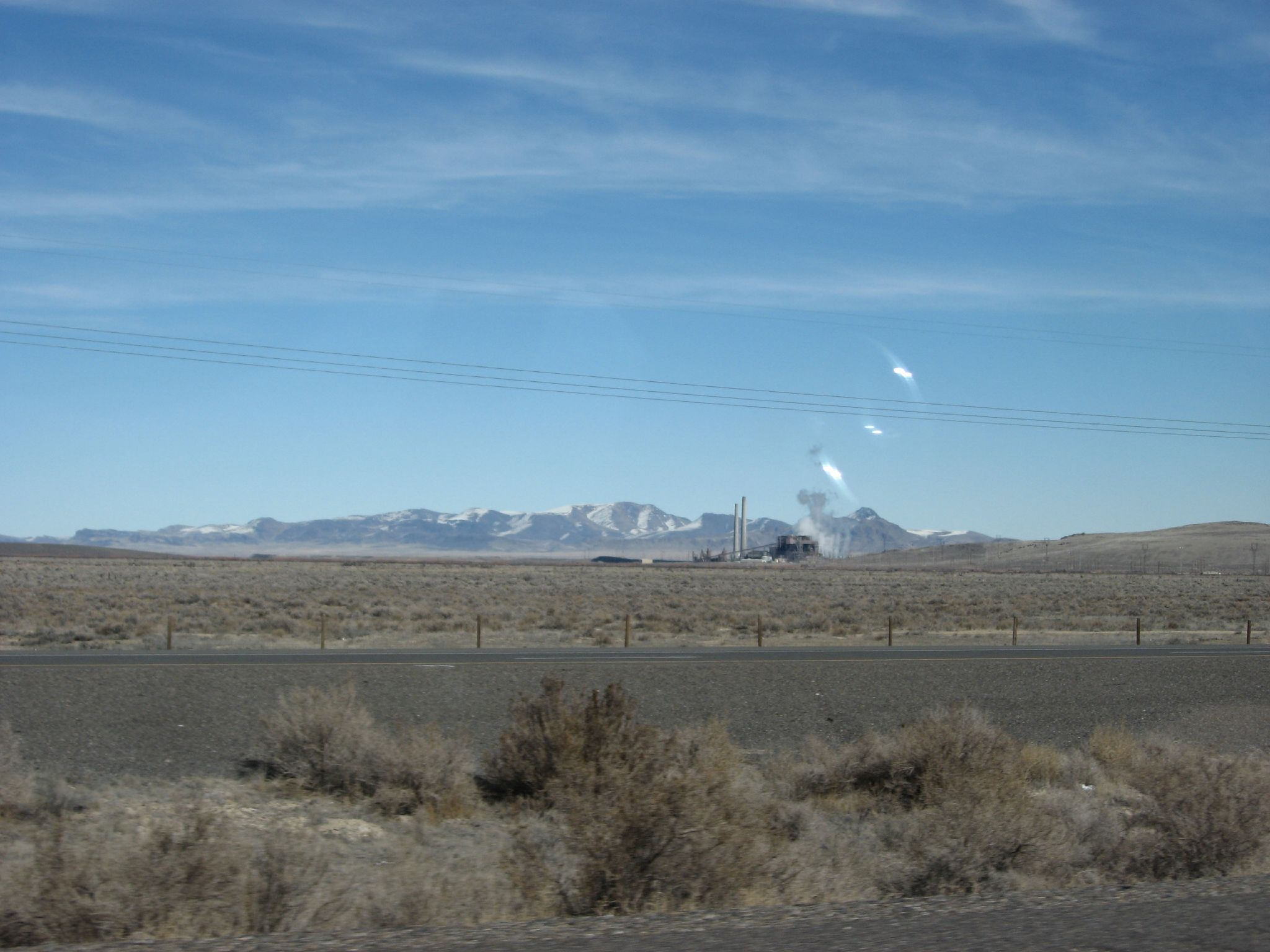
North Valmy Generating Station

North Valmy Generating Station is a 522-megawatt (700,000 hp) power station located near Valmy, Nevada. The plant is jointly owned by NV Energy and Idaho Power. It was converted from burning coal to natural gas in 2026.

This station can be seen from Interstate 80 near Golconda, NV. When It is run at high capacity it burned through over one hundred rail cars of coal per day. Coal was delivered to the location by the Union Pacific Railroad and originates in Utah and Wyoming.

== History ==
Construction was begun in 1979 by Sierra Pacific Resources on the plant. The first unit went on line in 1981 and is rated at 254-megawatt (341,000 hp) with a Babcock & Wilcox Boiler and Westinghouse turbine/generator. The second unit followed in 1985 and is rated at 268-megawatt (359,000 hp)with a Foster Wheeler Boiler and General Electric turbine/generator.

By 2012, it was anticipated that unit 1 will be taken out of service in 2022 and unit 2 by 2025. The owners plan 600 MW solar with 480 MW storage as partial substitutes, the plan for which was approved in January 2022. The two hybrid solar projects are expected to be completed in 2024.
