= Getchellite =

Sulfide-antimonide of arsenic, mineral

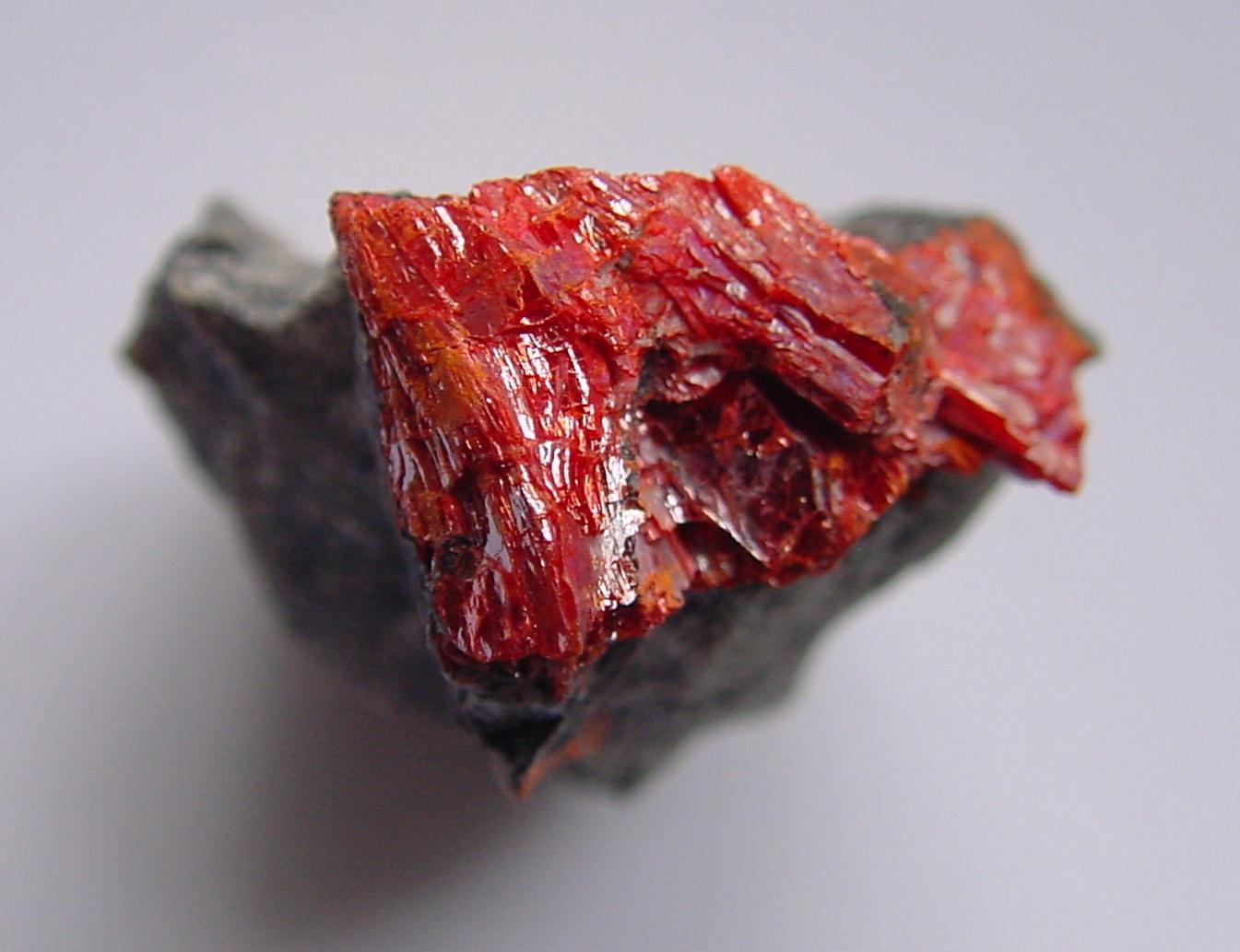
- Getchellite from Khaidarkan, Fergana Valley, Osh Oblast, Kyrgyzstan. Specimen size 3.6 cm.

General
- Category: Sulfide mineral
- Formula: AsSbS_{3}
- IMA symbol: Get
- Strunz classification: 2.FA.35
- Dana classification: 2.11.1.2
- Crystal system: Monoclinic
- Crystal class: Prismatic (2/m) (same H-M symbol)
- Space group: P2_{1}/a

Identification
- Formula mass: 293.81 g/mol
- Color: Dark red, sometimes with a purple to green iridescent tarnish
- Crystal habit: Subhedral crystals and massive with a platy texture
- Twinning: Simple and polysynthetic twins with the twin plane and composition plane parallel to {001}
- Cleavage: Perfect on {001}
- Fracture: Splintery
- Tenacity: Sectile; cleavage flakes are flexible and inelastic
- Mohs scale hardness: 1.5 to 2
- Luster: Vitreous to pearly on cleavage surfaces, otherwise resinous
- Streak: Orange red
- Diaphaneity: Transparent
- Specific gravity: 3.92 (observed) 4.0 (calculated)
- Optical properties: Biaxial (+), 2V=46°
- Refractive index: n = 2.720. Dispersion r > v strong
- Melting point: 340 °C to 355 °C
- Other characteristics: Not radioactive

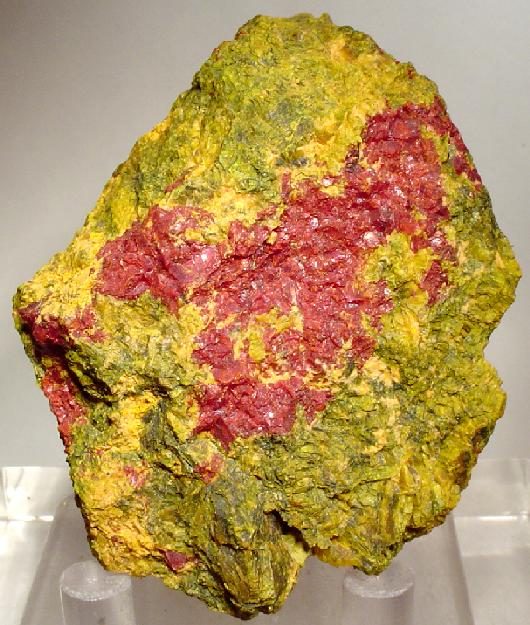
Red Getchellite and yellow Orpiment from the Getchell Mine, the type locality.

Getchellite is a rare sulfide of arsenic and antimony, AsSbS_{3}, that was discovered by B. G. Weissberg of the New Zealand Department of Scientific and Industrial Research in 1963, and approved as a new species by the International Mineralogical Association in 1965. Many metal sulfides are grey to black, but a few are brightly colored. Orpiment is yellow to brownish gold, cinnabar is deep red and getchellite is a bright orange red.

== Thermal properties ==
Getchellite turns darker red when heated, becoming black by the time it reaches its melting point. Close to this temperature it sublimes (changes directly from a solid to a vapor) and recrystallizes on cooler surfaces as minute acicular black crystals.
Melting point: 340 °C to 355 °C. Boiling point: near 470 °C.

== Structure ==
Each of the semimetal atoms, arsenic and antimony, is bonded to three sulfur atoms to form a trigonal pyramid characteristic of elements in group V of the periodic table. These (As,Sb)S_{3} pyramids form 8-membered (As,Sb)_{8}S_{8} rings which in turn combine to form sheets parallel to (001), with each sulfur atom bonded to two semimetal atoms. The occupancy of the metal sites is disordered, and within the sheets the 8-membered rings are orientated normal to the plane of the sheet. The sheet structure is responsible for the cleavage and twin planes of getchellite Unit cell a = 11.949 Å; b = 9.028 Å; c = 10.130 Å; β= 116.15°; V = 980.9 Å^{3}; Z = 8. Space group P2_{1}/a.

== Powder diffraction ==
X-Ray Powder Diffraction:
d spacing	2.89	4.44	3.63	2.54	2.33
relative intensity	10	8	7	6	6

== Discovery ==
In August 1962 Weissberg visited the Getchell mine at Adam Peak, about 32 km northeast of Golconda, in Humboldt County, Nevada, US. The purpose of his visit was to collect samples for a study of the relationship between various fairly common sulfides, not to look for new minerals. Getchellite was in some of the samples, but it was not discovered until the rocks were re-examined, a year later. The new mineral was named after the Getchell Mine, which in turn became the type locality. Samples from the mine are preserved as type material (a reference material for the mineral), at the Smithsonian National Museum of Natural History, Washington, D.C., US.

== Environment ==
At the type locality getchellite is found in an epithermal (formed at low temperature) arsenical gold deposit in a narrow, steeply dipping fault zone cutting across interbedded shales, argillites (lithified muds and oozes) and limestones, near an intrusion of granodiorite.
Associated minerals are orpiment, realgar, stibnite, cinnabar and quartz, as well as galkhaite, laffittite, chabournéite, christite, lorandite, marcasite, barite, fluorite and calcite.

== Distribution ==
Getchellite is found at the type locality in Nevada, United States, and also in Azerbaijan, China, Iran, Japan, Kyrgyzstan and Russia.

== Synthesis ==
Getchellite has been synthesized from As_{3}SbS_{6} glass in sodium sulfide solutions at 2600 C. and 1,000 bars pressure.
