= Silver mining in Nevada =

Silver mining in Nevada, a state of the United States, began in 1858 with the discovery of the Comstock Lode, the first major silver-mining district in the United States. Nevada calls itself the "Silver State." Nevada is the nation's second-largest producer of silver, after Alaska. In 2014 Nevada produced 10.93 million troy ounces of silver, of which 6.74 million ounces were as a byproduct of the mining of gold. The largest byproducers were the Hycroft Mine (1.82 million oz), the Phoenix Mine (1.65 million oz), the Midas Mine (1.49 million oz) and Round Mountain (0.58 million oz).

Silver mining in Nevada

== Rochester district ==
The Rochester district in Pershing County was discovered and named in the 1860s by prospectors from Rochester, New York. The district was not a large producer until the early 20th century. In its boom years from 1912 to 1921, the district produced 6.4 million troy ounces (200 metric tons) of silver, 52 thousand troy ounces (1.6 metric tons) of gold, and 110 thousand pounds (50 metric tons) of lead. The minerals occur in quartz veins contained in Triassic rhyolite.

The Rochester Mine is the only currently operating primary silver producer in Nevada and the second largest in the US, after the Greens Creek mine in Alaska. In 2015 it produced 4.6 million ounces of silver and 52,588 ounces of gold from an open pit and heap leaching operation. It is owned by Coeur Mining.

== Comstock Lode ==
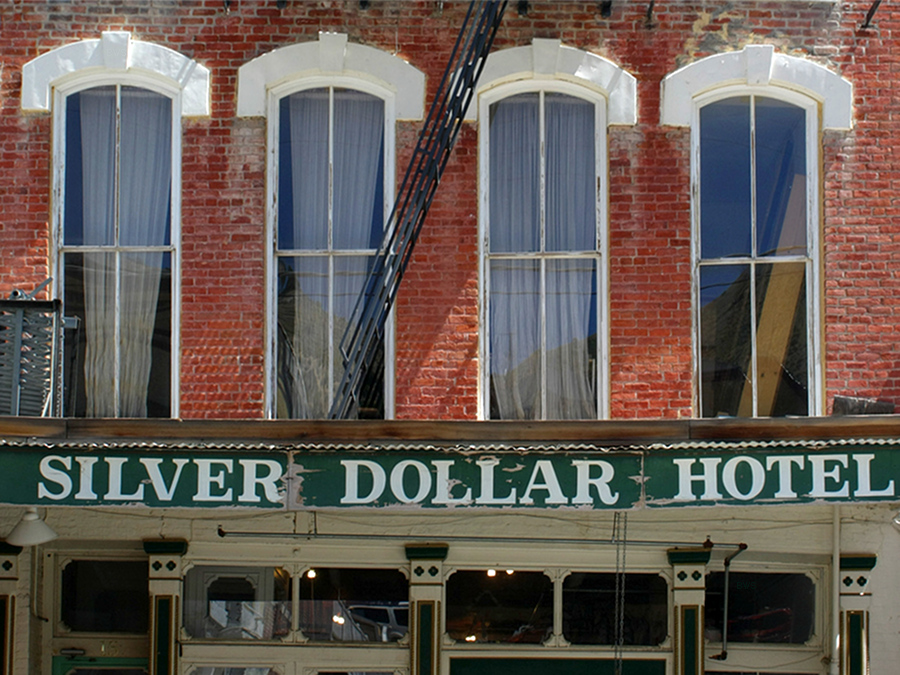
Upper facade of the Silver Dollar Hotel in Virginia City

The Comstock Lode had been a minor gold placer district since 1849. In 1859, several prospectors discovered its rich lode silver ore, and a great rush of miners poured eastward from California, and established Gold Hill and Virginia City, the principal towns of the Comstock Lode. The district has been mostly inactive since the 1920s.

The Comstock was the first important silver-mining district in the United States, and its discovery stimulated a great deal of prospecting for silver across the Great Basin area of the United States. The resulting silver rush led to many other silver discoveries in Nevada, including Austin (1862), Eureka (1864), and Pioche (1869).

The largest operating mine in the Comstock District is the Lucerne Mine near Gold Hill, which produced 222,416 ounces of silver and 19,601 ounces of gold in 2014.

== Reese River district ==
The silver deposits of the Reese River mining district were discovered in 1862. The town of Austin was established, and in 1863 became the county seat of the newly formed Lander County. By 1867, there were 11 ore-processing mills in the district. The ore deposits are veins in quartz monzonite and quartzite.

== Eureka district ==
The silver deposits at Eureka in Eureka County were discovered in 1864, but because of the high lead content of the ore, the silver could not be successfully recovered by amalgamation mills. Mining did not boom until after a smelter was built in the district in 1869. Most metal production occurred from 1869 to 1893.

The ore bodies are replacement deposits of silver and gold-bearing galena in Paleozoic sedimentary rocks. Early production was of the oxidized zone, where the galena was altered to cerussite and anglesite in a gangue of limonite, goethite, and calcite. When the miners extended the shafts down into the unoxidized zone, they mined the original sulfide minerals, and added zinc to the list of recoverable metals. Through 1964, Eureka made 4.0 million troy ounces (120 metric tons) of silver, 170 thousand troy ounces (5.3 metric tons) of gold, 370 million pounds (170 thousand metric tons) of lead, 14 million pounds (6,400 metric tons) of zinc, and 2.1 million pounds (950 metric tons) of copper.

== Pioche district ==
Mining in the Pioche district in Lincoln County began in 1869 from silver veins in the Cambrian Prospect Mountain quartzite. Replacement manto-type ore bodies were later discovered in the Highland Peak Limestone of Cambrian age.

== Tonopah district ==
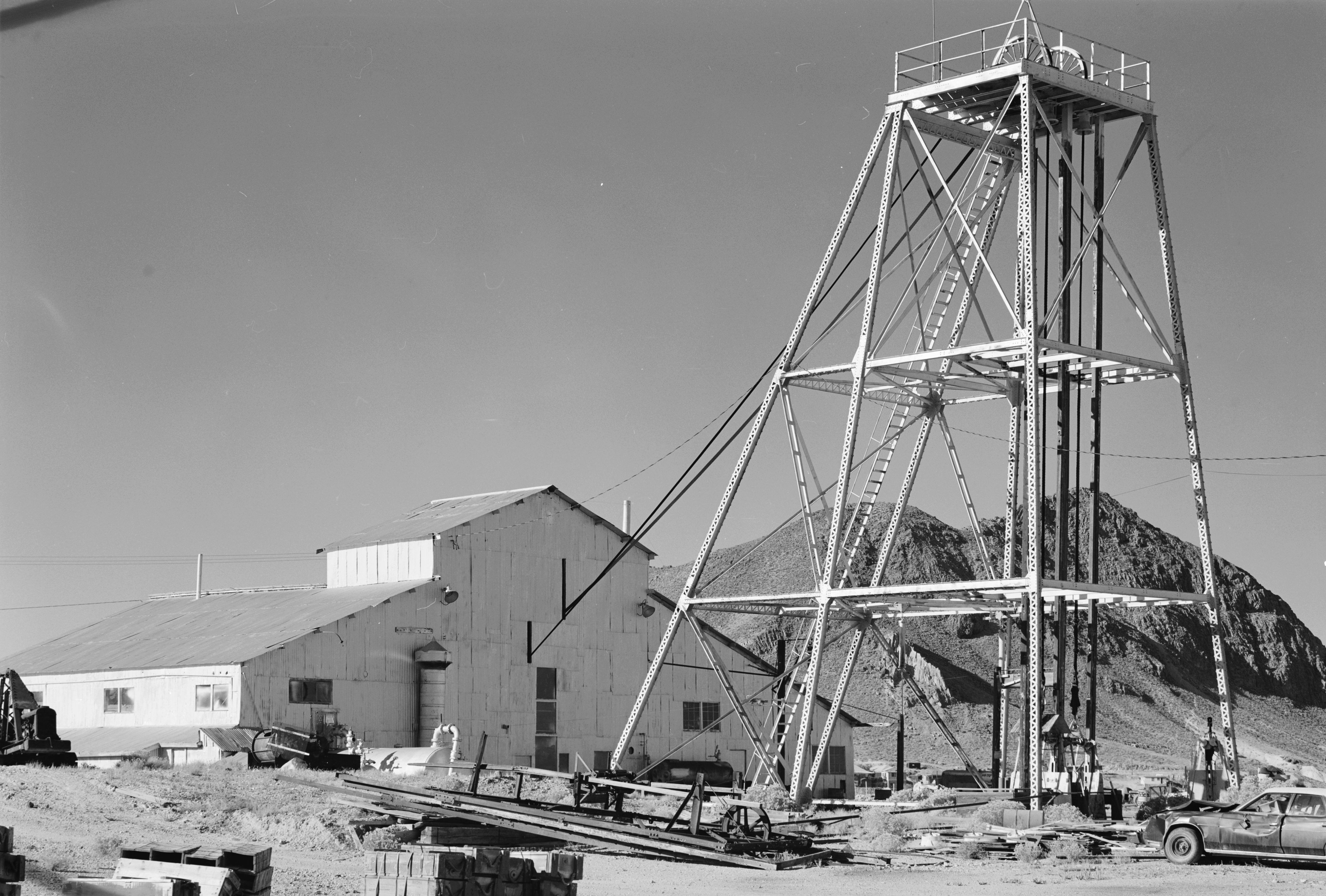
Mizpah mine, Tonopah

The last great silver-mining district to be developed in Nevada was Tonopah, in Nye County, discovered in 1900. The silver deposits are replacement veins in Tertiary volcanic rocks. Through 1921, the district produced 138 million troy ounces (4,300 metric tons) of silver and 1.5 million ounces (47 metric tons) of gold.

== See also ==
- Silver mining in the United States
- El Dorado Canyon (Nevada)
