= Valmy, Nevada =

- Census-designated place
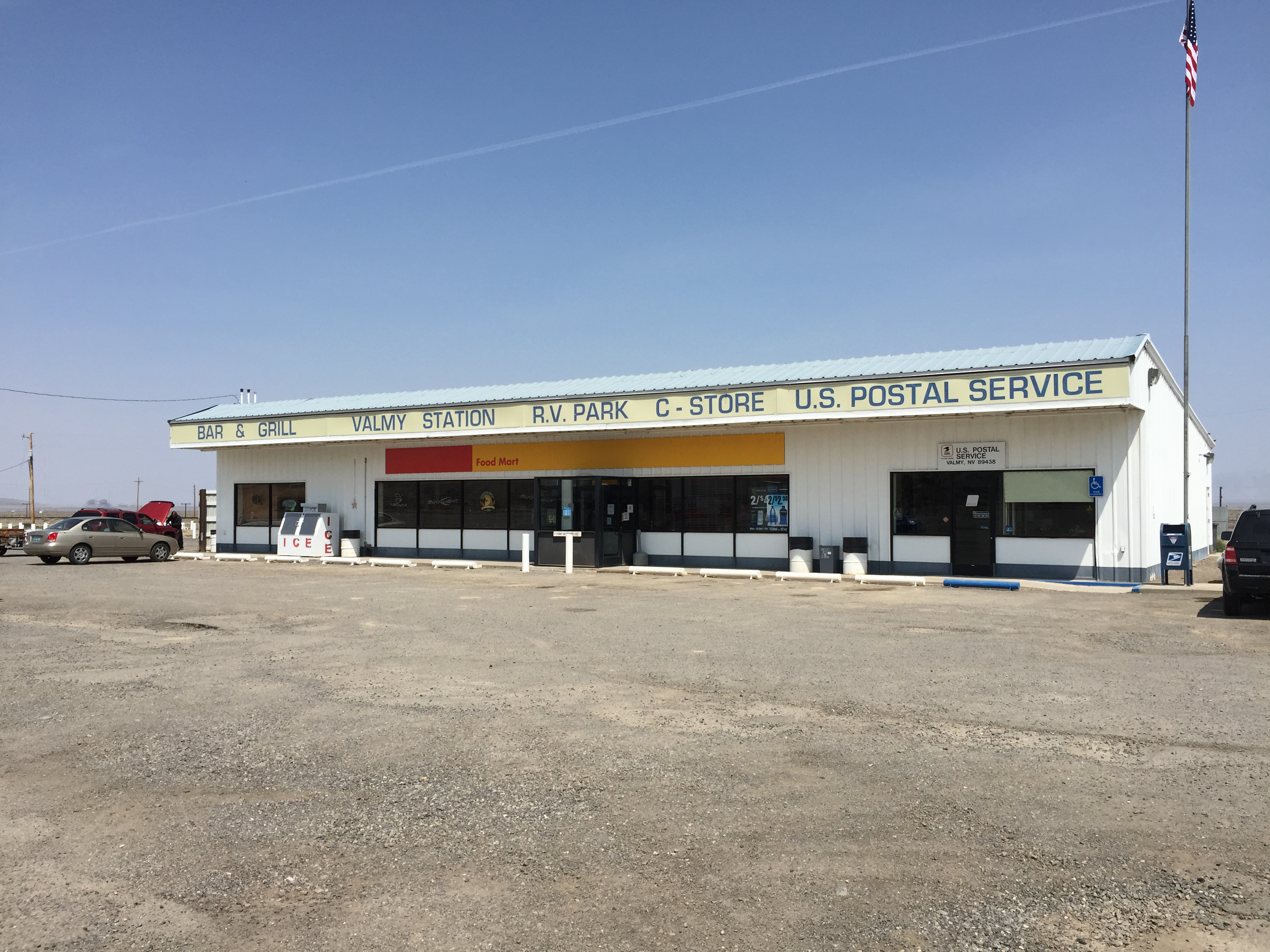
- Valmy Station and Post Office

- Location within the state of Nevada
- Coordinates: 40°47′34″N 117°07′36″W
- Country: United States
- State: Nevada
- County: Humboldt

Area
  - Total: 0.22 sq mi (0.57 km^{2})
  - Land: 0.22 sq mi (0.57 km^{2})
  - Water: 0 sq mi (0.00 km^{2})
- Elevation: 4,521 ft (1,378 m)

Population (2020)
  - Total: 26
  - Density: 118.3/sq mi (45.68/km^{2})
- Time zone: UTC-8 (Pacific (PST))
  - Summer (DST): UTC-7 (PDT)
- FIPS code: 32-78200
- GNIS feature ID: 2583961

Nevada Historical Marker
- Reference no.: 167

Valmy is a census-designated place in Humboldt County, Nevada, United States, named after the Battle of Valmy in France. The Lone Tree gold-mining complex is located adjacent to I-80; mining ended there in 2007, though a small gold resource remains in place there. In 2021, Nevada Gold Mines sold the mine to i-80 Gold, who hope to process ore there.

The Marigold mine is located further south of I-80 and has been in production since 1989.

Valmy is also home to the North Valmy Generating Station, jointly owned by NV Energy and Idaho Power.

Valmy has a post office with the ZIP code 89438. As of the 2020 census, Valmy had a population of 26.

== History ==
Established in 1910 by the Southern Pacific Railroad as a section point, it became Valmy on March 24, 1915. The post office from Stone House, Nevada, was moved to Valmy at that time. In 1932 Eugene DiGrazia bought Valmy's gas station, store, post office and bus depot.

== Popular culture ==
In August 1977, Eric Meola shot photographs of Bruce Springsteen in Valmy, including one in front of DiGrazia's gas station. In 2010, one of the photographs became cover art for The Promise.

== Demographics ==
Historical population
| Census | Pop. | Note | %± |
|---|---|---|---|
| 2020 | 26 | | — |
U.S. Decennial Census
