= Stone House, Nevada =

- Ghost town
- Location within Nevada Location within the United States
- Coordinates: 40°50′14″N 117°10′19″W
- Country: United States
- State: Nevada
- County: Humboldt
- Elevation: 4,459 ft (1,359 m)
- Time zone: UTC-8 (Pacific (PST))
  - Summer (DST): UTC-7 (PDT)
- GNIS feature ID: 858334

Stone House is a ghost town in Humboldt County, Nevada, United States.

A. Woodward, one of the signers of the 1851 "Washoe Code" that dealt with early land claims, was killed near this location in the autumn of 1851. Woodward had partnered with George Chorpenning on a monthly mail contract. Woodward was killed while fulfilling that contract.

A post office was located in Stone House from 26 November 1890 to 24 March 1915, when it was moved to Valmy, Nevada.

Note that there are at least two other locations named Stone House in Nevada. One in Nye County and another located in the Osgood Mountains of Humboldt County. In addition, there is Stonehouse located in White Pine County and Stonehouse Canyon, located near Farrell, Nevada in Pershing County.

== See also ==
List of ghost towns in Nevada
