= Goldstrike mine =

Gold mine in Eureka County in north-eastern Nevada

Goldstrike Mine
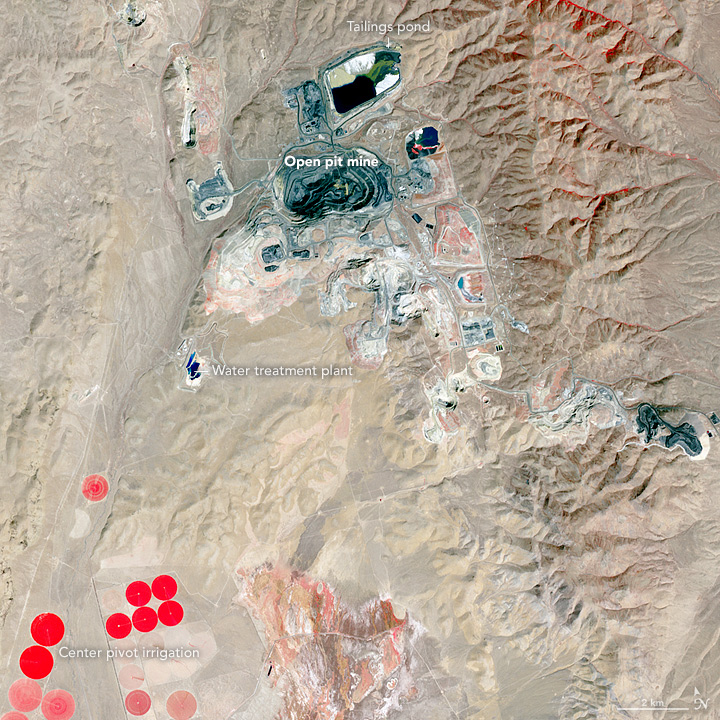
- Goldstrike Mine from space, 2016. The large Betze-Post open pit is labelled at top center. False color image: see source for details.

- Location in Nevada
- Location: Eureka County, Nevada, United States; 40°58′54″N 116°22′44″W
- Products: Gold
- Production: 795,664 ounces (22,556.7 kg)
- Financial year: 2018
- Opened: 1975
- Company: Barrick Gold
- Website: Goldstrike webpage
- Acquired: 1986

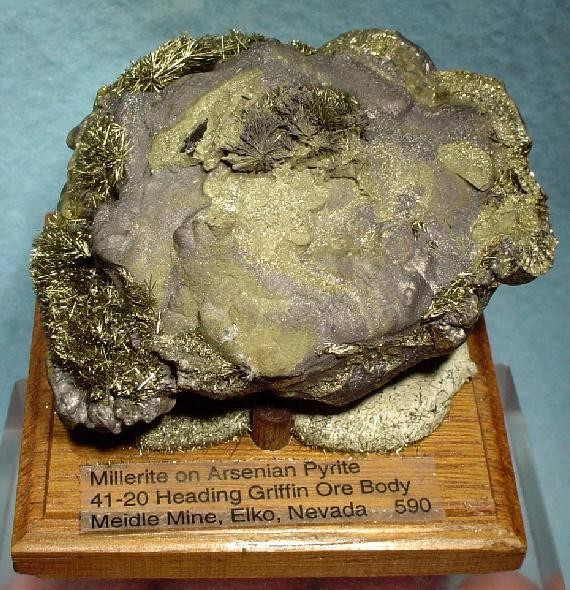
Millerite- Arsenian Pyrite specimen from the underground Meikle mine, Goldstrike complex.

Goldstrike is a gold mine in Eureka County in north-eastern Nevada. It is located on the Carlin Trend, a prolific gold mining district. It is owned and operated by Barrick Gold. Since Barrick acquired Goldstrike in 1986, until 2018 it produced 44.4 million ounces of gold.

== History ==
The first discovery of gold in the Goldstrike property was in 1962 by Atlas Minerals. Gold was first mined from the upper, well-oxidized portion of what became the Post deposit in 1975 by PanCana Minerals Ltd., in a small open-pit heap leach operation. In 1978, Western State Minerals Corporation entered into a joint venture (JV) with PanCana. The JV delineated ore reserves for the Post deposit in 1986. Barrick acquired 100% ownership of the property in December 1986, and mining started in 1987.

== Geology ==
The Goldstrike mine complex comprises the Betze-Post-Screamer and Meikle-Rodeo deposits. The Goldstrike mine adjoins Newmont Mining's Carlin mine complex. Goldstrike is northwest of the Carlin mine on the Carlin Trend.

Like most Carlin type gold deposits in Nevada the gold was epithermally deposited in carbonate or silicate sedimentary rocks. The heat source was magmatic but the exact mechanism is still under debate. The Betze-Post deposits are up to 6,000 feet (1,800 m) long, 600 feet (180 m) thick and 800 feet (240 m) wide. In 2018 the average gold grade was 0.109 troy ounces (3.4 g) per ton for open pit ore, and 0.274 troy ounces (8.5 g) per ton for underground pit ore, for a mine average of 0.230 troy ounces (7.2 g) per ton.

== Mining operations ==
The Goldstrike complex consists of three distinct mines: the large Betze-Post open-pit mine, and the Meikle and Rodeo underground mines. The ore from all three mines is milled, oxidized in either a roaster or an autoclave, then leached in either a carbon-in-leach (CIL) cyanidation circuit or a calcium thiosulfate circuit. The two treatment facilities treat ores from both the open pit and underground mines. Recovered gold is processed into doré on-site and shipped to outside refineries for processing into gold bullion.

In 2015 the Betze-Post open-pit mine produced 642,493 oz (18,214.4 kg) of gold and 87,223 oz (2,472.7 kg) of silver, while the Meikle-Rodeo underground operations yielded 411,003 oz (11,651.7 kg) of gold and 17,749 oz (503.2 kg) of silver. This was 24% of the total 5,339,659 oz (151,376.8 kg) output of all gold mining operations in Nevada for 2015. In 2018 Goldstrike produced 795,663 ounces of gold, making it the world's eighth largest gold mine.

== See also ==
- Gold mining in Nevada
- List of active gold mines in Nevada
