= Marigold mine =

Gold mine in Nevada, US

Marigold gold mine
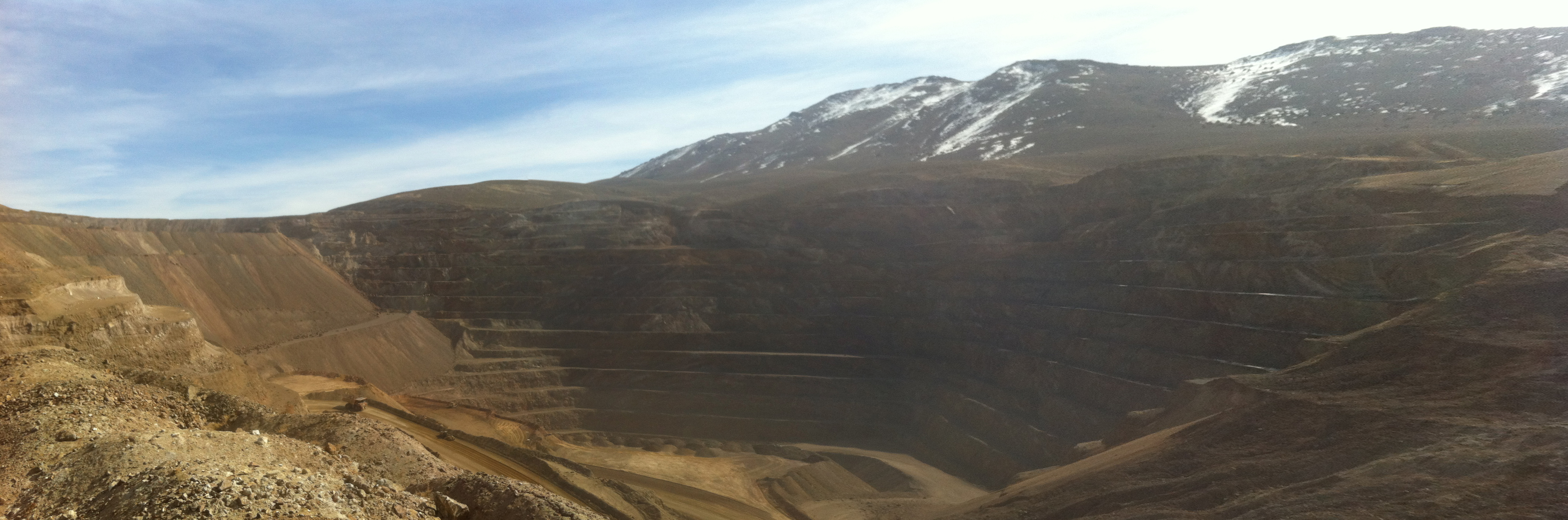
- Marigold mine in 2013

- Location within Nevada
- Location: Valmy, Nevada; 40°43′47″N 117°10′33″W
- Products: Gold
- Production: 205,161 ounces
- Financial year: 2018
- Type: Open-pit
- Opened: 1988
- Company: SSR Mining Inc.
- Website: ssrmining.com
- Acquired: 2014

The Marigold gold mine is an open-pit gold mine in Valmy, Nevada, 14 miles (23 km) west-northwest of Battle Mountain. The mine is owned and operated by SSR Mining Inc.

== History ==
The mine is located in northeastern Nevada, in eastern Humboldt County, 36 miles east of Winnemucca and four miles south of Valmy. The mine started production in 1989. SSR claims it was the first mine certified by the International Cyanide Management Code.

The mine was owned 66.7% by Goldcorp and 33.3% by Barrick Mining, until February 2014, when Barrick and Goldcorp sold the mine to SSR Mining, for $275 million.

In October 2017, a collision in the open pit portion of the mine killed two workers and injured others. Operations at the mine were suspended pending an investigation from the Mine Safety and Health Administration.

An estimated 80 million tonnes of ore are processed from Marigold annually. Its record year for gold extraction was 2023, with 278,000 ounces extracted that year. On December 30, 2024, the five millionth ounce of gold was extracted from Marigold Mine—three million being while in SSR's ownership. In 2025, its depletion was estimated for the mid-2030s.

== Geology ==
Gold mineralization at Marigold is finely disseminated within sedimentary and metasedimentary rocks, including limestone, siltstone, breccias, meta-basalts and quartzite. The mining operation comprises 11 open pits, eight waste rock stockpiles, three leach pads, two carbon-in-leach processing facilities and a carbon processing and refining facility.

As of 31 December 2018, the mine had Proven and Probable Reserves of 201.5 million tonnes at an average gold grade of 0.47 g/t, for 3.3 million ounces of gold. An anticipated mine-life, as of June 2018, of over ten years was estimated based on current Mineral Reserves.
