= Cortez Mountains =

Mountain range in Nevada, United States

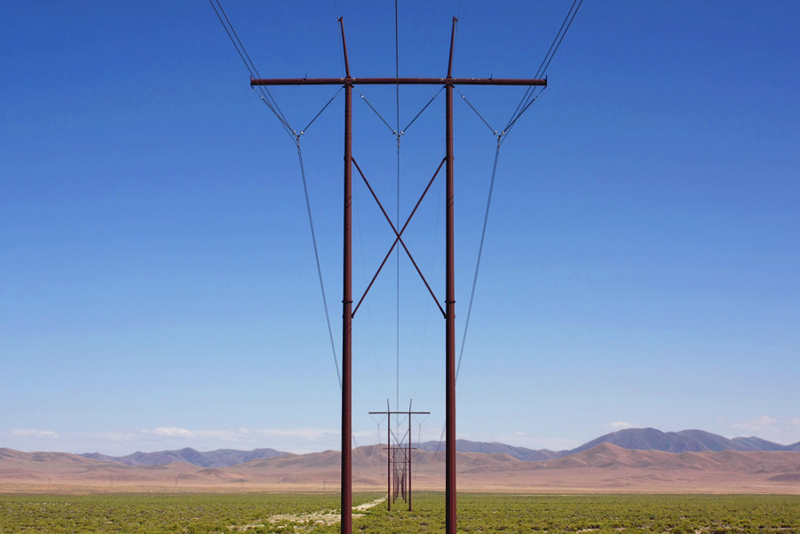
- HVAC transmission towers cross Crescent Valley eastward toward the Cortez Mountains in the distance.

Highest point
- Peak: Mount Tenabo
- Elevation: 2,790 m (9,150 ft)
- Coordinates: 40°09.80′N 116°34.99′W

Geography
- Location within Nevada
- Country: United States
- State: Nevada
- District(s): Eureka and Lander counties
- Range coordinates: 40°18′39.711″N 116°20′5.277″W
- Topo map(s): USGS Crescent Valley 30x60 and Battle Mountain 30x60

The Cortez Mountains are located in north central Nevada in the United States. The range lies in a southwest-northeasterly direction between Crescent Valley and Pine Valley. Mount Tenabo is the principal peak of the range, at 9,153 feet above sea level. Surrounding ranges include: the Shoshone Range to the northwest, the Pinon and Sulphur Springs ranges to the east, the Simpson Park Mountains to the south and the Toiyabe Range to the southwest across the narrow Cortez Canyon. The northeastern end of the range reaches the Humboldt River at Palisade about 9.5 miles (15.3 km) southwest of Carlin.

The Bureau of Land Management oversees 70% of the range, while privately held land accounts for the other 30%. Vegetation is primarily pinyon-juniper, montane shrub, and sagebrush steppe. At least four different species of mice live in the range. The side-blotched lizard and the chisel-toothed kangaroo rat are also found in the mountains.

The range is named after Hernán Cortés, the 16th-century Spanish conquistador.
