= Carlin–type gold deposit =

Sediment-hosted disseminated gold deposit

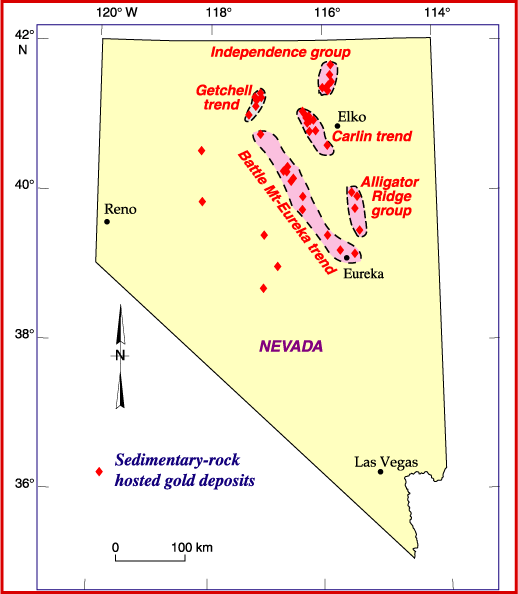
Sedimentary-rock hosted gold deposits in Nevada. All of the deposits shown that are north and east of the Battle Mountain-Eureka trend (and many of the others) are Carlin-type gold deposits. Source: USGS

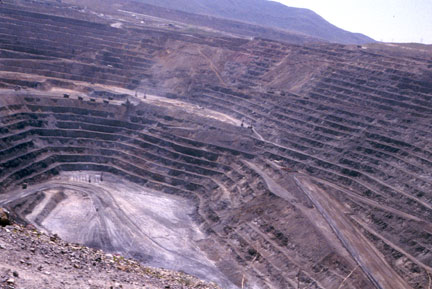
Goldstrike (Post–Betze) Mine, Carlin Trend, Nevada, the largest Carlin-type deposit in the world, containing more than 35,000,000 ounces of gold.

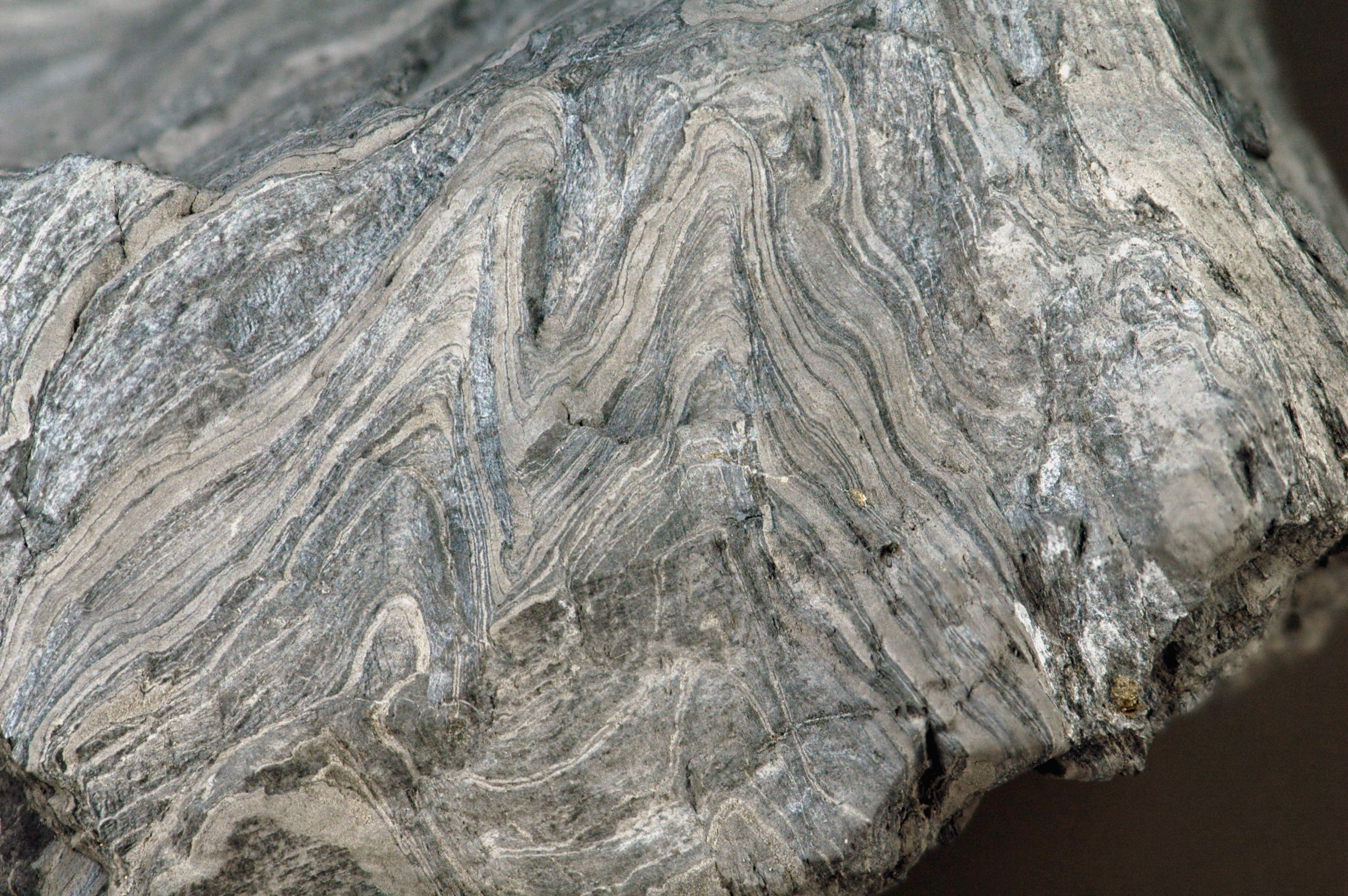
Turquoise Ridge (Getchell Mine) gold ore, FoV ~5 /cm across. Grade ~0.35 oz Au/ton. Altered Comus fm. mud/shale with highly contorted bedding (post-depositional, soft-sediment deformation). The rock has been decalcified and weakly silicified.

Carlin–type gold deposits are sediment-hosted disseminated gold deposits. These deposits are characterized by invisible (typically microscopic and/or dissolved) gold in arsenic rich pyrite and arsenopyrite. This dissolved kind of gold is called "invisible gold", as it can only be found through chemical analysis. The deposit is named after the Carlin mine, the first large deposit of this type discovered in the Carlin Trend, Nevada.

== Geology ==
The Carlin type deposits show enrichment in the elements gold, arsenic, antimony, mercury, thallium and barium. This enrichment is created by hydrothermal circulation with a temperature of up to 300 °C. The underlying rocks out of which the minerals are dissolved are normally silty carbonates, although silicates and other sediments are possible. The source of the heating for the water in the hydrothermal circulation is still under discussion. The material in the deposit is altered in a way that the carbonate minerals are either dissolved or converted to the silicates by silicate rich hydrothermal water. For example, dolomite is transformed into jasperoid. Another alteration is the formation of clay minerals by interaction of water and feldspar. The absence of base metal sulfides and the even distribution of the pyrite and arsenopyrite in the host rock are the most obvious difference to other sulfide deposits.

During the Eocene, fluids flowed through the lower plate of thrust faults and the underlying fractured carbonates. These fluids were magmatic, meteoric, and metamorphic in origin. A low pH in the fluids allowed for a significant amount of carbonate rocks to dissolve. The presence of carbonate in the water kept the fluids reduced. This reduction facilitated the movement of gold within sulfate rich epithermal fluids. The low temperature, low salinity fluids replaced the carbonate rocks with ore deposits that included gold. Later, when the Basin and Range began its extension, normal faulting took place, and the ore deposits were downfaulted and buried under alluvial sediment.

== Mining ==
The Carlin–type deposits represent some of the largest hydrothermal gold deposits in the world. The invisible nature of the gold in the deposit makes it difficult to find deposits of that kind. The class of deposit was defined after the Carlin mine became a mass producer of gold in the 1960s and it was recognized that other deposits of that type should exist. Most of the mines in the Great Basin in the United States belong to the Carlin type. Similar "Invisible Gold" deposits have also been found in northern Canada, China, Iran, and Macedonia; but the relationship between these deposits and those in Nevada are debated.

== See also ==
- Gold mining in Nevada
