= Mount Tenabo =

Mountain in Nevada, U.S.

- Location within Nevada

Highest point
- Elevation: 9,157 ft (2,791 m) NAVD 88
- Prominence: 3,153 ft (961 m)
- Coordinates: 40°09′47″N 116°35′05″W

Geography
- Location: Eureka County, Nevada, U.S.
- Parent range: Cortez Mountains
- Topo map: USGS Cortez

Mount Tenabo (Shoshoni: "Lookout Mountain") is the principal peak in the Cortez Mountains. The mountain is of cultural and religious significance to the Western Shoshone people.

== Etymology ==
There are various theories as to the name's etymology. The mountain may have been named by New Mexicans after an ancient pueblo, or Tenabo may be a Paiute word, meaning of "dark colored water".

== Geography ==
The summit elevation of Mount Tenabo is 9,157 feet (2,791 m), which is 5,000 feet (1,500 m) above the surrounding valleys. Its base is covered with scrub pine. The summit and 1,500 feet (460 m) below is overgrown with grass and shrubs. Approximately 25 miles (40 km) to the north is the Humboldt River and its valley. Eastward, there are hills and valleys. To the west is the Smoky Valley, Mount Hope, Bunker Hill, and other peaks of the Toiyabe Range. Mount Tenabo, east of and near the north end of the Toiyabe Range, is about 30 miles (48 km) south of Beowawe.

At an area approximately 3,000 feet (910 m) above the mountain's base, a vein of silver-bearing quartz cuts through obliquely, penetrating into the valley after for 18,650 feet (5,680 m). Its width is 400 feet (120 m). This vein (stratum) contains ore beds, and is encased in crystalline limestone.

== History ==
Silver ore was discovered at Mount Tenabo in 1862. By the later half of the 1860s, there were at least 20 working mills. In 2008, the Te-Moak tribe, the Timbisha tribe and others sought an emergency injunction that would have halted further development of Barrick Gold's Cortez Hills mining operation which includes facilities on the slopes of Mount Tenabo. As of July 2016, mining continues while the BLM prepares a court-ordered supplemental environmental impact statement.
