= Pinon Range =

Mountain range in Nevada, United States

Coordinates: 40°37′41″N 116°01′09″W

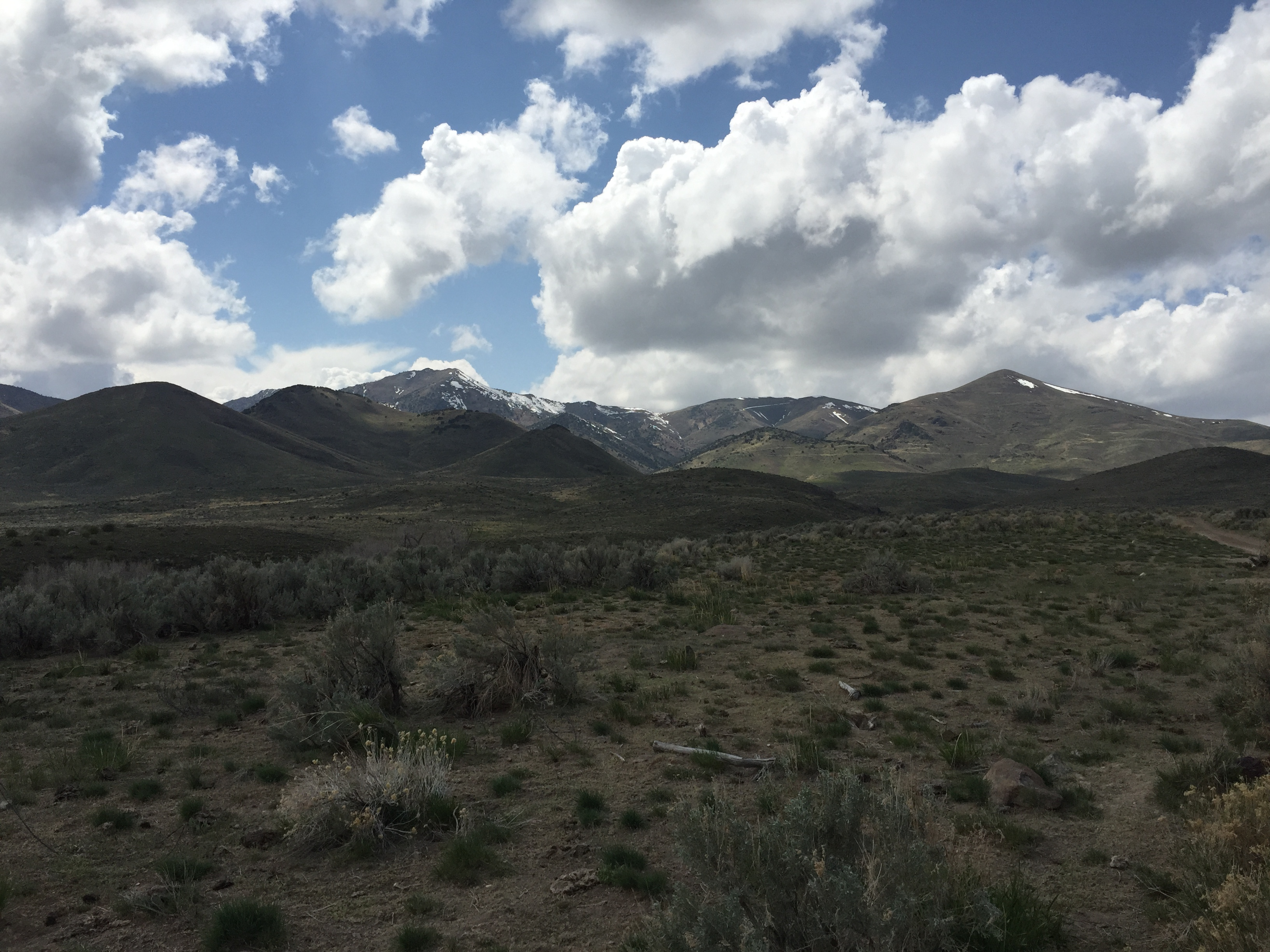
View of Bunker Hill in the Pinon Range

The Pinon Range is a north–south trending range in western Elko County, Nevada, in the Great Basin region of the western United States. The highest elevation in the range is 8,752 feet (2,668 m).
