= Bald Mountain mine =

Gold mine in Nevada, United States

Coordinates: 39°56′31″N 115°32′32″W

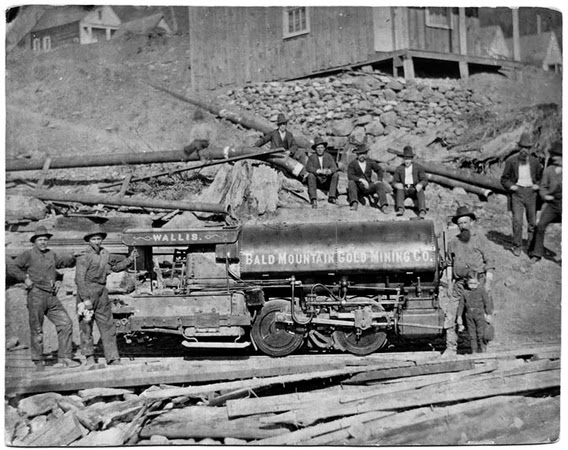
- 'Wallis' a 20 gauge mine locomotive of Bald Mountain Gold Mining Co
- Interactive map of Bald Mountain mine
- Location: White Pine County, Nevada, United States
- Products: Gold
- Production: 284,646 oz
- Financial year: 2018
- Company: Kinross Gold Corporation

The Bald Mountain Mine is a large gold mine in northern Nevada. It is an open-pit, run-of-mine, heap leach gold mine with conventional heap leaching technology and carbon absorption for ore treatment. The mine is located in White Pine County, Nevada, 110 kilometers southeast of Elko.

Proven and probable gold reserves were:

- December 31, 2011 .... 5.102 million ounces
- December 31, 2012 .... 5.161 million ounces
- December 31, 2013 .... 2.500 million ounces
- December 31, 2014 .... 1.361 million ounces
- December 31, 2015 .... 1.142 million ounces
- December 31, 2016 .... 2.133 million ounces
- December 31, 2017 .... 1,698 million ounces
- December 31, 2018 .... 1.347 million ounces

In January 2016, Kinross Gold acquired Bald Mountain along with a 50% interest of the Round Mountain gold mine from Barrick Gold Corporation for $610 million in cash.

== 2018 production ==
In 2018, 284,616 ounces of gold (2017: 282,715 oz) were produced, at a cost of $547 per ounce, a 15% improvement on the previous year's cost.

== See also ==
- Kinross Gold
