= Round Mountain Gold Mine =

Gold mine in Nevada, United States

Round Mountain
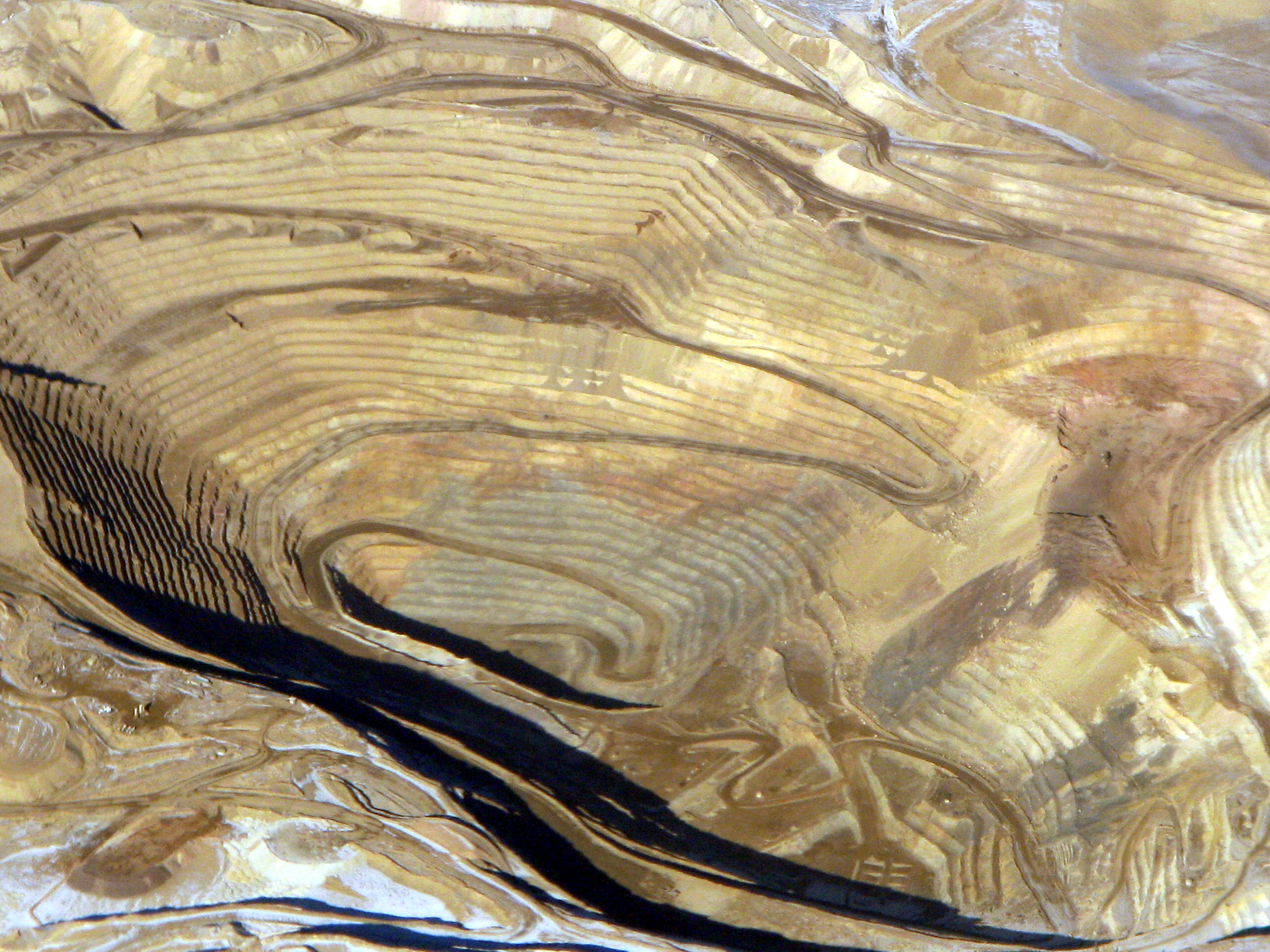
- Aerial photo of Round Mountain open pit in 2008

- Location of Round Mountain Gold Mine
- Location: Nye County, Nevada, United States; 38°42′36″N 117°03′58″W
- Production: 324,277 oz gold
- Financial year: 2020
- Opened: 1906
- Company: Kinross Gold Corporation
- Website: kinross.com
- Acquired: 2003

The Round Mountain Gold Mine is an open pit gold mine in Round Mountain, Nevada. The mine is operated and owned by Kinross Gold.

== History ==
Mining at Round Mountain occurred as early as 1906, using underground techniques. The mine produced 350,000 ounces of gold through underground mining over a sixty-year period, before converting to an open pit. In 2003 Kinross acquired 50% of the Round Mountain mine from Echo Bay Mines through a merger. In 2016, Kinross purchased the remaining 50% from Barrick Gold Corporation.

== Description ==
The Round Mountain Gold Mine is owned and operated by Kinross Gold. Until early in 2016, it was a 50:50 joint venture between Barrick Gold and Kinross Gold, with Kinross as the operator. The mine is 55 miles (89 km) north of the town of Tonopah, with a workforce of approximately 750 people. In 2010, expansion of the mine was approved by the Bureau of Land Management. The expansion would include increasing the depth and width of the pit, and increasing the capacity of related mining and mineral processing infrastructure. The expansion was appealed by the non-governmental organizations Great Basin Resource Watch and the Western Shoshone Defense Project. The groups also appealed the construction of Gold Hill, a second pit near Round Mountain, that is part of the expansion. As of summer 2011, road construction and environmental mitigation began for the Round Hill expansion. Ore from the Gold Hill site is processed on site on a leach pad, while the pouring of gold bars takes place at the Round Mountain facility.

== Geological Setting ==
The Round Mountain Mine is a low sulfidation epithermal deposit.

== See also ==
- Kinross Gold
- List of active gold mines in Nevada
