= Getchell Mine =

Gold mine in Nevada, United States

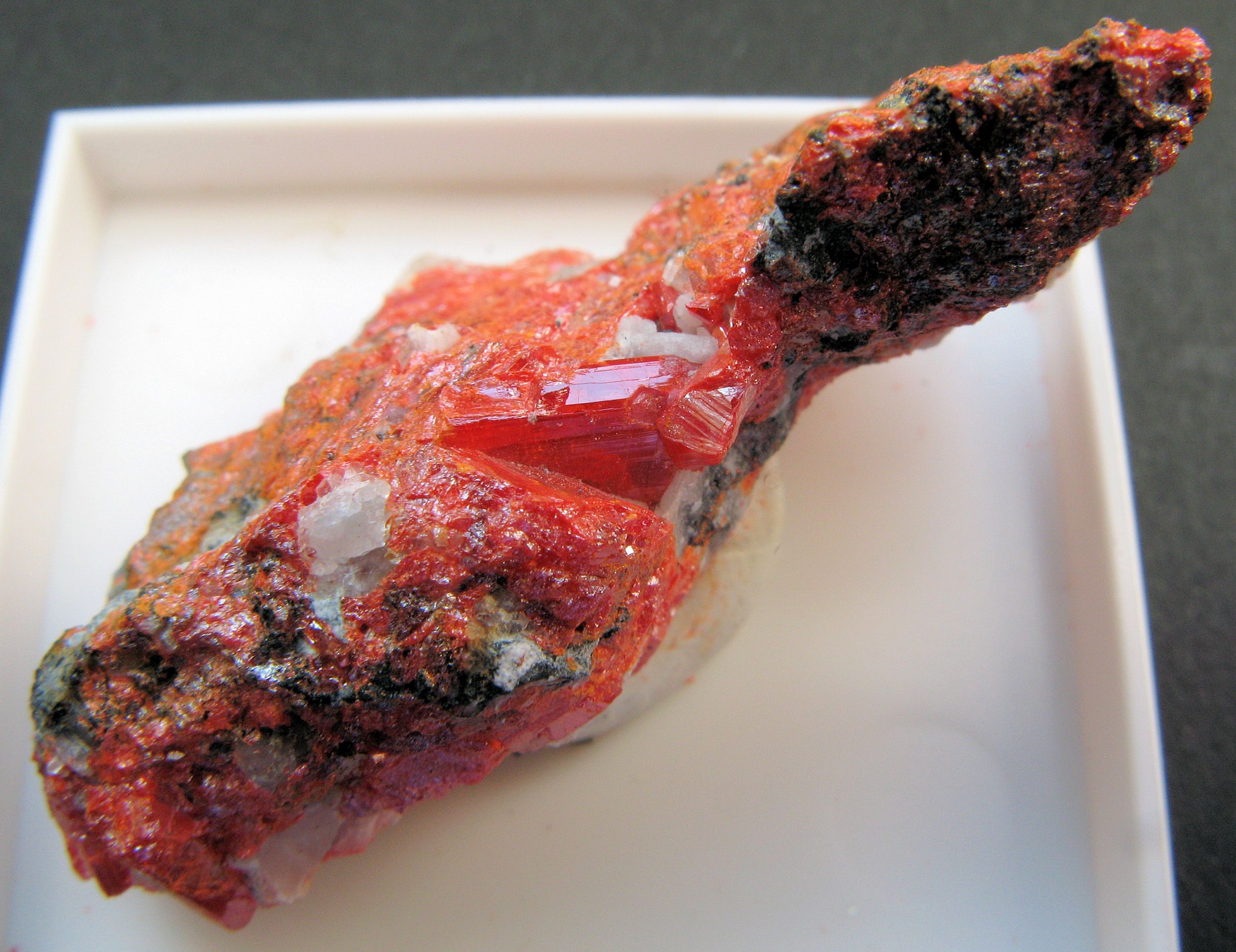
- Realgar from the Getchell Mine. Characteristic traces of silver, arsenic, antimony, mercury, thallium and barium are associated with Carlin-type mineralization, and are widely used as pathfinders in geochemical prospecting for gold.

- Location within Nevada
- Location: Nevada, United States; 41°13′19.68″N 117°15′3.48″W

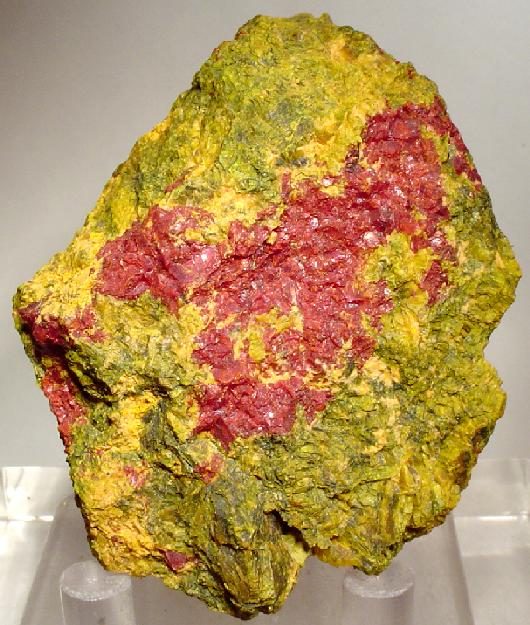
Getchellite (red) & Orpiment (yellow) from the old Getchell open pit. Don't lick your hands after handling these rocks!

The Getchell Mine is an underground gold mine in the Potosi Mining District of Humboldt County, Nevada, on the east flank of the Osgood Mountains, 35 miles northeast of Winnemucca. Prospectors Edward Knight and Emmet Chase discovered gold in 1933 and located the first claims in 1934. With the financial backing of Noble Getchell and George Wingfield, the Getchell Mine, Inc. was organized in 1936 and the mine was brought into production in 1938.

The mining operation currently consists of two underground mines, Getchell and Turquoise Ridge, operated as the Turquoise Ridge Joint Venture. Barrick Gold is operator and 75% owner with Newmont Mining owning the remaining 25%. The mining methods currently used are cut-and-fill and long hole stoping. The refractory gold ore is treated by pressure oxidation technology at the Twin Creeks Sage autoclave and gold recovered using conventional carbon-in-leach technology.

The gold deposit is a sediment-hosted disseminated Carlin–type deposit, with sub-micron sized gold distributed in pyrite and marcasite.

The mineral getchellite, a rare sulfide of arsenic and antimony, AsSbS_{3}, was discovered at and named after the Getchell mine.
