= SSR Mining =

Mining company

SSR Mining Inc.
- Formerly: Silver Standard Resources Inc.
- Company type: Public
- Traded as: TSX: SSRM; Nasdaq: SSRM; Russell 2000 component; ASX: SSR
- Industry: Mining & Exploration
- Founded: 1946; 80 years ago
- Headquarters: Denver, Colorado, U.S.
- Key people: Rod Antal (president, CEO, & director Alison (CFO)
- Products: Gold; Silver; Copper
- Number of employees: 2,429 (December 31, 2021)
- Website: ssrmining.com

SSR Mining Inc., formerly Silver Standard Resources is a Denver-based gold, silver, copper, lead and zinc producer that owns the largest silver mine in Argentina. In addition it engages in exploration activity throughout the Americas (5 countries) and Turkey. In 2020, SSR Mining merged with Alacer Gold. Since the merger, the company has moved headquarters to Denver, Colorado. Rodney P. Antal is now the president and CEO of SSR mining (replacing Paul Benson after the merger closed). In February 2021, SSR Mining announced that Alison White would be the new executive vice president and CFO (replacing Greg Martin). In addition, the rest of the executive team at SSR mining was added following the closure of the merger between SSR and Alacer Gold. Stewart Beckman is the executive vice president and COO (replacing Kevin O'Kane at the time of merger); F. Edward Farid is the vice president and CCDO (chief corporate development officer). Michael J. Sparks is the vice president and chief legal and administrative officer. In addition, the rest of the leadership team and information can be found on their website. The merger created a company worth $4.0 billion

== Active mines ==
=== Puna Operations ===
The Puna Operations are in the Jujuy Province, Argentina. They include the Chinchillas and Pirquitas mines. The Pirquitas mine is located in north-west Argentina. Reserves there are enough to keep it producing for 14.5 years at an average annual rate of 10 million ounces for silver and 2,500 tonnes for tin. In 2010, its first year of production, it produced 6.3 million ounces of silver, almost 70% of that in the second half. According to an analyst at Blackmont it will become "one of the world's primary silver mines".

The Chinchillas mine supplies ore to the Pirquitas processing facility.

=== Marigold mine ===
Located in Humboldt County, Nevada, United States, the gold mine started operations in 1988.

=== Seabee Gold Operation ===
Located near Laonil Lake, Saskatchewan, Canada, the mine has started operations in 1991. The Seabee Mine Aerodrome services the mine

== Projects ==
In December 2010 it sold the Snowfield and Bruceback projects to Pretium Resources for C$442 million.

In August 2011 it sold Australian silver project Bowdens (97.1 million ounces in measured/inferred silver resources) to gold miner Kingsgate Consolidated for $75 million, $65 million of which will be paid when the deal closes (a portion of which is Kingsgate company shares).
