= Carlin Unconformity =

Geologic feature in Nevada, United States

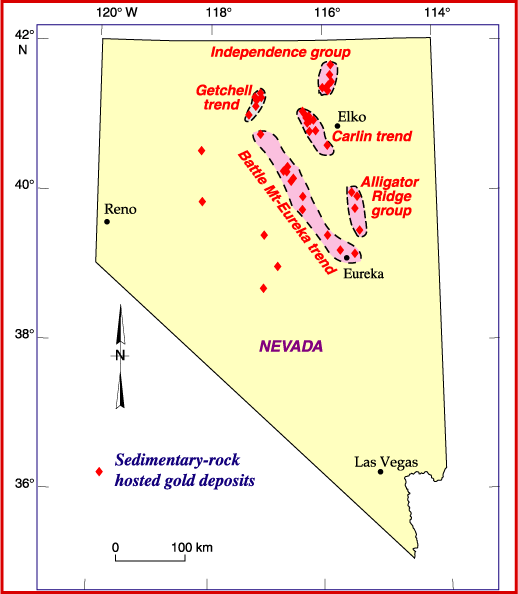
Carlin Trend, shown with other alignments of sediment-hosted gold deposits in Nevada. Source: USGS.

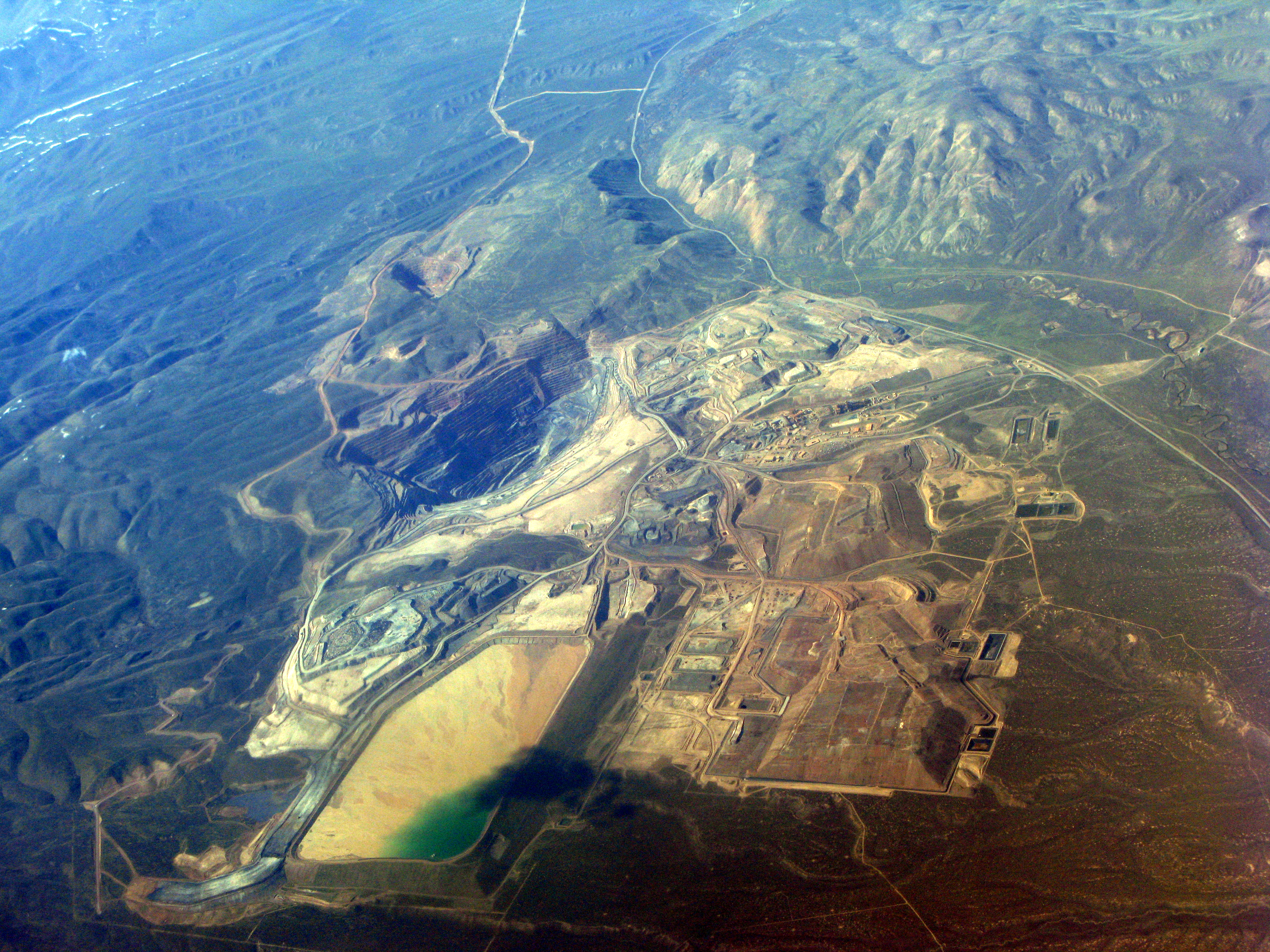
Newmont's Gold Quarry mine in 2009, on the Carlin Trend

The Carlin Unconformity or Carlin Trend is a geologic feature in northeastern Nevada which represents a period of erosion or non-deposition likely associated with a collision between a tectonic crustal block called a terrane and the North American Plate. The collision occurred during the Mississippian Period, about 350 million years before present. The collision is associated with the Antler Orogeny.

The collision induced higher crustal temperatures and pressures which produced numerous hot springs along the suture zone. Several episodes of subsurface magmatism are known to have occurred subsequent to the collision, associated with tectonic forces affecting the entire Basin and Range Province. During each of these episodes, and particularly during the Eocene epoch, hot springs brought dissolved minerals toward the surface, precipitating them out along fissures. Among these minerals were gold and silver.

The Carlin Gold trend is one of the world's richest gold mining districts. It is a belt of gold deposits, primarily in Paleozoic limy sediments, that is about 5 mi (8.0 km) wide and 40 mi (64 km) long, extending in a north-northwest direction through the town of Carlin, Nevada. Gold was first discovered in the area in the 1870s, but there was little production until 1909, and only about 22,000 ounces was produced through 1964. By 2008, mines in the Carlin Trend had produced over 70 million ounces of gold, worth around $85 billion at 2010 prices.

== See also ==
- Carlin–type gold deposit
- Gold mining in Nevada
- John Livermore
- Ralph J. Roberts
