= Gold mining in Alaska =

Gold mining in Alaska, a state of the United States, has been a major industry and impetus for exploration and settlement since a few years after the United States acquired the territory in 1867 from the Russian Empire. Russian explorers discovered placer gold in the Kenai River in 1848, but no gold was produced. Gold mining started in 1870 from placers southeast of Juneau, Alaska.

Gold occurs and has been mined throughout Alaska, except in the vast swamps of the Yukon Flats, and along the North Slope between the Brooks Range and the Beaufort Sea. Areas near Fairbanks and Juneau, and Nome have produced most of Alaska's historical output and provide all current gold production as of 2021. Nearly all of the large and many of the small placer-gold mines currently operating in the US are in Alaska. Seven modern large-scale hard-rock mines operated in Alaska as of 2019; five were gold-producing mines. There are also small-scale hard-rock gold-mining operations. In 2019, Alaska produced 539,390 troy ounces (16,777 kg), 8.4% of the total national production, second only to Nevada (76%). This total was in steady decline from a peak of 1,022,987 ounces (29,001.2 kg) in 2013, which had been the highest since 1906. 2019 production was from five major mines: Fort Knox, Pogo, Kensington, Greens Creek and Dawson.

For 2018, gold worth $888,302,130 accounted for 28% of the mining wealth produced in Alaska. In comparison, zinc and lead, mainly from the Red Dog mine, accounted for 66%; silver, mainly from the Greens Creek mine, accounted for 6.6%, and coal accounted for 1.1%. Alaska produced a total of 49,270,000 troy ounces (1,532,000 kg) of gold from 1880 through the end of 2018.

== Active mines ==
The following are active gold-producing mines and advanced lode exploration or development projects.

=== Lode (hard rock) mines ===
- The Fort Knox mine is located within the Fairbanks North Star Borough, 25 miles (40 km) northeast of Fairbanks. The mine site is located primarily on State of Alaska and the Mental Health Trust lands. The mine is wholly owned by Kinross Gold Corporation. The mine opened in 1996 and in 2019 produced 200,263 troy ounces (6,228.9 kg) of gold. Fort Knox is an open-pit operation using carbon-in-pulp, heap leach, and gravity processes to recover gold. At the end of 2015 there were reserves of 162.4 million tons at 0.012 ounce of gold per ton (0.37 g/t), sufficient to carry the mine plan into year 2020, within a total identified resource of 284.4 million tons at 0.013 ounce per ton (0.40 g/t), containing 1,900,000 troy ounces (59,000 kg) of gold. Total 2015 employment at Fort Knox was 657 full-time-equivalent positions.
- The underground Pogo gold mine is owned and operated by Northern Star Resources, on State of Alaska-owned land 38 mi (61 km) northeast of Delta Junction in the Goodpaster district. In 2019 it produced 154,589 troy ounces (4,808.3 kg) of gold from stacked, shallow-dipping quartz veins up to 65 ft thick (20 m). Pogo had 640 employees on site in 2018.
- The underground Kensington gold mine, owned by Coeur Mining, is located 45 air miles north of Juneau and 35 air miles (56 km) south of Haines, located in the Berners Bay mining district. Access to the mine is by air or sea. The ore deposit consists of multiple mesothermal quartz, carbonate, and pyrite vein swarms and discrete quartz–pyrite veins hosted in Cretaceous diorite. Ore is processed in a flotation mill that produces a gold-bearing concentrate. In 2019 127,914 troy ounces (3,978.6 kg) of gold were produced from 21,829 tons of concentrate that were shipped to an off-site refinery. The December 2015 Proven and Probable Reserve was 2.8 million tons of ore at 0.198 ounces of gold per ton (6.16 g/t) with 560,000 troy ounces (17,000 kg) of contained gold out of a total identified resource, inclusive of the Proven and Probable Reserve, of 6.7 million tons at 0.263 ounces of gold per ton (8.18 g/t). There were 332 full-time-equivalent employees at Kensington at the end of 2015.
- The Greens Creek mine is a silver-lead-zinc-gold mine owned and operated by Hecla Mining, located on private and federal land in the Admiralty mining district, 18 miles (29 km) southwest of Juneau. The Greens Creek deposit is a polymetallic, stratiform, volcanogenic massive-sulfide deposit that opened in 1989. In 2019, Greens Creek produced 56,625 troy ounces (1,761 kg) of gold. The mine also produced 9,890,125 troy ounces (307,617 kg) of silver, 51,532 tonnes of zinc and 18,245 tonnes of lead. As of December 31, 2019 Hecla reported a proven and probable reserve of 10.72 million tons of ore at 12.2 ounces of silver per ton, 2.80 g/t (0.09 oz/t) of gold, 2.8 percent lead, and 7.3 percent zinc. The estimated measured and indicated mineral resource was 8.645 million tons at 11.7 ounces of silver per ton, 0.1 ounce of gold per ton, 2.8 percent lead, and 8.1 percent zinc. In 2017 there were 414 local direct full-time-equivalent employees, part of a total of 975 direct, indirect, and induced employees.
- The Manh Choh gold mine is located near Tok that began operation in September 2023. It is jointly operated by a subsidiary of Kinross Gold Corporation and Contango Ore. It is expected to produce 225,000 troy ounces (6,998 kg) of gold over 4.5 years. The first gold bar was produced in July 2024 at the Fort Knox gold mine, where the ore is shipped via highway haul trucks.

==== Advanced gold-bearing hard rock exploration projects of note ====
- The Donlin Gold project, in the Kuskokwim Gold Belt, contains a Proven and Probable Reserve of 33.8 million ounces at a grade of 2.09 g/t (using a gold price of US$975/oz), within a Measured and Indicated Resource of 39 million ounces of gold at 2.03 g/t. Donlin is one of the largest known undeveloped gold deposits in the world. If developed according to plans published in spring 2009 it will be one of the largest gold mines in the world. A large and robust series of felsic sills and dikes host the gold in association with small-scale quartz (and lesser quartz and/or carbonate) veinlets. The sills intrude a thick sequence (5000+ feet) of non-metamorphosed, folded, graywacke, sandstone, and shale. The deposit occurs on private land owned by native corporations Calista Corporation and The Kuskokwim Corp. Donlin Creek LLC, equally owned by Barrick Gold and NovaGold Resources, holds a lease on the land and operates the project. Donlin Gold is expected to be a conventional open pit, truck-and-shovel operation. Production is expected to occur over 27 years.
- Pebble Copper, discovered in 1987, is one of the largest known copper-gold porphyry deposits in the world. It is located on State of Alaska-owned land. The deposit contains a measured and indicated resource of 6.46 billion tonnes of ore grading 0.34 g/t gold, 0.40% copper, and 0.024% molybdenum, for 70.6 million ounces of gold, 56.9 billion pounds of copper, and 3.42 billion pounds of molybdenum (at a 0.3% copper-equivalent cutoff grade).
- The Niblack prospect, a copper-gold-zinc-silver VMS deposit on southeastern Prince of Wales Island, in the Ketchikan Mining District. Mineralization occurs as massive sulfide bodies hosted within a local rhyolite belt within a package of deeply deformed and metamorphosed volcanic and sedimentary rocks. In the last ten years, significant underground and surface exploration occurred at this early-1900s mine site. At November 2011, an Indicated Resource estimate was 3.4 million tonnes of ore grading 0.81% copper, 1.32 g/t gold, 1.29% zinc and 20.10 g/t silver, containing 118.1 million pounds of copper, 317,220 troy ounces of gold, 215.0 million pounds of zinc, and 5.35 million troy ounces of silver.

=== Placer mining ===
Placer mining continues throughout Alaska. Placer mine production during the 5 years to 2014 has averaged 74,360 ounces of gold or 8 percent of the total gold produced in Alaska annually. All of these operations are seasonal, none employ more than a few dozen people. Many are family operations with roots reaching back several generations. The 2015 estimate of 120 full-time-equivalent jobs attributed to placer gold mining as reported by the Mine Safety and Health Administration is underreported and is considered a minimum estimate.

== Historical lode and placer gold mines ==
=== Southeast Alaska ===
==== Porcupine district ====
Over 81,000 troy ounces (5,600 lb; 2,500 kg) of placer gold came from the Porcupine district near Haines. Porcupine Creek, about 20 miles (32 km) north of Haines, is the site of an 1898 gold discovery; the creek has been intermittently placer mined ever since. Outside of the Porcupine basin only a few other creeks – Glacier, Nugget and Cottonwood – produced significant gold. The area around Reid Inlet, in modern Glacier Bay National Park and Preserve, hosted several hard rock gold prospects, including the LeRoy mine, which exploited quartz veins for about 10,000 ounces of gold production. The district, which includes Skagway and Haines, is bordered to the north and east by Canada. To the west is the Pacific Ocean and the Chichagof District lies to the south. The Discovery Channel series Gold Rush Alaska takes place in this region.

==== Juneau district ====
In 1880 a local inhabitant, Chief Kowee, revealed to prospectors Joe Juneau and Richard Harris the presence of gold in what is now named Gold Creek in Silver Bow Basin. The city of Juneau was founded there that year. The strike sparked the Juneau gold rush, which resulted in the development of many placer and lode mines including the largest, at the time, gold mines in the world – the Treadwell complex of lode mines on Douglas Island (across a narrow sea channel from Juneau) and the AJ lode mine, in Juneau itself.

Over 7 million ounces of lode gold and 80,000 troy ounces (2,500 kg) of placer gold have been recovered from the Juneau district.

==== Admiralty district ====
Most of the gold recovered from the Admiralty mining district (which consists of Admiralty Island) is a by product of silver and base metal mining. The Alaska Empire underground lode mine recovered gold from quartz veins in metamorphic rocks. Discovered and staked in the 1920s, production of about 20,000 tonnes of 0.25 ounce-per-ton gold ore occurred in the mid-1930s. The Funter Bay underground lode mine produced about 500 thousand tonnes of copper-nickel-cobalt ore, without gold, from a Mesozoic gabbro-norite pipe. No significant placer mining was done on Admiralty. About 500,000 ounces of gold, almost all from the currently operating Greens Creek lode silver mine, have been recovered from the Admiralty district.

==== Chichagof district ====
Chichagof mining district
- Location within Alaska
- Coordinates: 57°30′N 135°30′W

Approximately 800,000 ounces of gold have come from the Chichagof district. Chichagof, Yakobi, Baranof and smaller islands comprise the district. Numerous lode and placer prospects and mines exist in the district. Major production came from underground lode mines exploiting gold-in-quartz veins.

===== Apex-El Nido mine =====
The Apex-El Nido produced perhaps 50,000 ounces of gold from a mile of underground workings exploiting polymetallic quartz veins.

===== Hirst-Chichagof mine =====
From 1922 to 1933 the Hirst-Chichagof produced 133,000 ounces of gold and 33,000 ounces of silver from polymetallic quartz veins assaying nearly 1 ounce of gold per ton. There are over a mile of underground workings, reaching 2,000 feet (610 m) below the surface. Significant reserves remain, which have attracted exploration efforts in the 1980s and 1990s.

===== Chichagof mine =====
The Chichagof mine opened in 1905 and by 1942 had yielded 660,000 ounces of gold and 195,000 ounces of silver from quartz veins assaying over 1 oz gold per ton. There were several miles of workings on 5 levels. Six shafts reached a maximum of 2,750 feet (840 m) below sea level. Between 1981 and 1988 several thousand feet of new workings were dug, and engineering and environmental studies were done, but the project was abandoned.

==== Petersburg-Sumdum district ====
15,000 ounces of gold from placers, came from the Petersburg-Sumdum district which consists of; Zarembo, Etolin, and Wrangell Islands, and the mainland between the Juneau and Ketchikan districts. Many small lode deposits were located in the late 1890s and early 1900s. The most significant lode producer was the Sumdum Chief, which was discovered in 1889 and operated until exhausted in 1903. 24,000 ounces of gold were extracted from two quartz veins averaging ore of about 0.39 ounces per ton of both gold and silver. The mine reached a depth of 1,200 feet (370 m) and had a ten-stamp mill. In Windham Bay, a cluster of mineral claim holdings were consolidated in the 1920s; the Jensen mine was the most productive of these, producing about 50 ounces of gold. Several aerial tramways, thousands of feet long, connected various adits and mills.

==== Ketchikan district ====
Ketchikan mining district
- Location within Alaska
- Coordinates: 55°19′N 131°40′W

Approximately 58,000 ounces of lode gold and 4000 ounces of placer gold have come from the Ketchikan district, consisting of Dall, Prince of Wales, Revillagigedo, and smaller islands, as well some mainland, in the southernmost-part of Alaska. Numerous historical lode mines and prospects for base metals, uranium, rare earth elements (REE's), iron, and platinum group elements (PGE's), as well as gold exist in the Ketchikan district. Major gold production came from underground lode mines exploiting: gold-bearing quartz veins in metamorphic rocks (such as the Gold Standard, Sea Level, Dawson, Golden Fleece, and Goldstream mines); skarns (at the Jumbo and Kassan Peninsula copper-gold mines); zoned mafic-ultramafic plutons, as at the Salt Chuck silver-gold-copper-PGE mine; and VMS deposits such as Niblack.

A high-yielding mine in Ketchikan District is the Golden Fleece Mine, located about 0.2 mile north of the north end of James Lake on Prince of Wales Island, latitude: 55.152179, longitude: -132.056635. The mine was most active from 1901 to 1905.

=== Interior Alaska, north of the Yukon River ===
==== Chandalar District ====
Chandalar mining district
- Location within Alaska
- Coordinates: 67°40′N 148°30′W

The Chandalar district is the area around the upper drainage of the Chandalar River, includes some southern foothills of the Brooks Range, and extends to the crest of the Brooks Range. Discovery of placer gold in 1906 was quickly followed by lode discoveries. Most of the placer-producing creeks drain the area of lode mineralization. The district produced about 48,000 ounces of placer gold and 17,000 ounces of lode gold.

===== Little Squaw Creek =====
Little Squaw Creek drains an area cut by many auriferous veins. Some of the placers in the basin are exceptionally rich. By 1916 most of the shallow placers were playing out so miners shifted their interest to the placer drift mines (underground operations). The most notable of these is the Little Squaw Bench, including the Mellow Bench. Approximately 29,000 ounces of gold were recovered averaging 1.0 oz/cubic yard of gold in the gravels with spikes of up to 4.6 oz/cubic yard. Some individual nuggets were over 10 ounces. In 2010, gold production resumed with mining of the placer deposits by the Gold Rich Mining Company.

===== Little Squaw and Mikado lodes =====
In 1909 to 1915 development and underground gold mining occurred at the Little Squaw, with a few hundred feet of workings built and a few dozen ounces of gold recovered. The nearby Mikado mine enjoyed similar efforts around 1913. In the 1960s, 1970s and 1980s additional work was done. These later efforts probably recovered more than 10,000 ounces of gold. Significant efforts resumed in 2006, and are ongoing, to explore the Little Squaw placer and lode deposits.

==== Koyukuk-Nolan district ====
The district encompasses the upper Koyukuk River basin including the Alatna and Kanuti rivers and the village of Bettles. The district extends from the southern flank of the Brooks Range to the northern Ray Mountains, and is directly west of the Chandalar district. Much of the district is now in Gates of the Arctic National Park. Gold was discovered in placer deposits in the district in 1901. About 350,000 ounces of placer gold have been won from the area, perhaps 85% of it from near Wiseman. Mining continues today in the district. Much of the district is underlain by bedded Paleozoic rocks, a schist belt extends along the southern foothills of the Brooks Range. Cretaceous plutons intrude metamorphic rocks in the southern part of the district. Pleistocene ice sheets from the Brooks Range and cirque glaciers in the Ray Mountains covered much of the higher elevations. Glaciers are now restricted to the highest cirques of the Brooks Range.

===== Nolan Creek =====
Miners produced 235,000 ounces of gold from Nolan Creek between 1904 and 1999. Some of the placer gold is mined by underground methods in frozen gravels. A 42-troy ounce nugget, Alaska's twentieth-largest, came from Marys Bench on Nolan Creek. Placer mining activity continues, with a reserve of 214,760 ounces of gold reported in 2000.

===== Hammond River =====
Mining occurred on the Hammond River, a tributary of the Koyukuk River, from about 1900 to at least 2000. Exact production is unknown, but is estimated at 80,000 ounces.

A rich, deep channel was struck beneath the Hammond River in 1912, and during the following 4 years, over 48,000 oz gold were produced, including a 138.8-oz nugget. (Pringel, 1921; T.K. Bundtzen, written communication, 1999) Much of the gold was coarse: the third (146 troy oz.), fourth (139 troy oz.), 14th (61 troy ounces), and 17th (55 troy ounces) largest gold nuggets in Alaska were found on the Hammond River between Discovery claim and Vermont Creek a distance of 4 miles. Only the richest ground was possible to mine as the Hammond River was one of the most remote placer districts in North America until 1975 when the Dalton Highway for the Alaskan Pipeline project was completed. Historically the Hammond River is one of the largest gold producers in the Koyukuk district. Gold was discovered on the Hammond River, just above the lower canyon mouth, about 2 miles upstream from the Koyukuk River. In the early years, attempts were made to mine the modern stream gravels. At the mouth of Swift Creek a wing dam was built to divert the river for mining, but numerous cobbles and small boulders made the venture unprofitable. Approximately 500 ounces was recovered with pick and shovels in Summer of 1902. Later, shafts sunk 66 feet to bedrock at the discovery site were reported to show the presence of gold in paying quantities. The majority of the gold production on the Hammond came out of the deep channel as early miners were unable to deal with the water and cobbles in the present river channel.

The Hammond River contains deep channel, bench, and modern stream placers. Much of the Hammond River gold is of the coarse nugget variety. Several nuggets weighing from 45 to 59 oz were found in the early days. In 1914 a 138.8 oz nugget (fourth largest in Alaska) was found in a mud-filled crack on bedrock near Gold Bottom Gulch (Engineering and Mining Journal, 1915, p. 1021; T. Bundzten, personal communication, 1999).

In 1914, on No. 4 Above, Hammond River (Goldbottom Gulch), J. C. Kinney and partners picked up nuggets from bedrock valued at about $20,000; one nugget, the second largest ever found in Alaska, was worth $2600. The rest of the dump when sluiced yielded a little less than the value of the "pickings." (Engineering and Mining Journal, 1914, p. 1062 Vol. 98 No. 24. (Gold at $20.00 per ounce.)

Placers on Slisco bench, an ancient buried channel of Hammond River near Vermont Creek on the west side of the present Hammond River contain a measured resource of 31,099 oz gold with grades of up to 0.3 oz/cy. Inferred resources on the same bench range from 50,000 to 150,000 oz. (2002) . Other benches of Hammond River between Discovery Claim and Slisco Bench have similar potential but have not been systematically prospected with modern technology.

U.S. Department of Interior BLM-Alaska Technical Report 50 Mineral Investigations in the Koyukuk Mining District, Northern Alaska

Maddren USGS Bulletin 532 1913

==== Hughes District ====
The Hughes district includes the basin of the lower Koyukuk River (below the Kanuti). Much of the area is a swampy, lake-studded lowland, from which rises rounded hills to elevations of several thousand feet.

Placer mines in the Zane Hills on Bear Creek, a tributary of the Hogatza River, are the biggest source of gold from the district. Placer deposits clustered near the village of Hughes and Indian Mountain are the other significant source of placer gold from the district. The district has produced about 245,000 ounces, with traces of copper, lead, zinc, tin, silver and platinum.

==== Melozitna District ====
On the northern side of the Yukon River, between the Melozitna and Ray rivers, most of the district is rolling ridges with highest elevations over 5,000 feet (1,500 m), where now-gone Pleistocene cirque glaciers developed. Placer gold was discovered in 1907, but activity was sporadic and poorly recorded. About 10,000 ounces of gold, with significant by-product tin, was won from placer deposits by the 1960s.

=== Interior Alaska, south of the Yukon River ===
==== Kaiyuh District ====
Kaiyuh and Ruby mining districts
- Location within Alaska
- Coordinates: 64°00′N 156°00′W

===== Illinois Creek Mine =====
The mine is located in the remote Kaiyuh Mountains of west-central Alaska about 40 miles (64 km) south of the Yukon River village of Galena. The Illinois Creek lode gold-silver mine exploited a shear-hosted gold deposit which was partly expressed as color anomalies visible from aircraft. Located on State of Alaska land, it was discovered in the 1980s. In February 1996 a feasibility study was completed, with the deposit estimated to contain about 350,000 ounces of gold and 2,500,000 ounces of silver. Construction began the next month, but was halted by winter conditions in November. By then, with the development uncompleted and six-million more than the total mine construction-and-operating budget of 26-million dollars already spent, USMX, the mining company that owned Illinois Creek, was millions of dollars in arrears on invoices and short on cash. New financing allowed construction to resume in 1997; the mine poured its first gold in June 1997. In 1998 the company entered bankruptcy. In 1999 the State of Alaska assumed control of the mine. A mine-to-reclaim arrangement between the state and a newly involved mining contractor resulted in the reclamation and closure of the mine by 2005. A bond is in place to provide environmental monitoring for 30 years.

==== Ruby-Poorman District ====
The Ruby-Poorman District lies south of the Yukon River. The district produced nearly a half million ounces of gold, all from placer mines. The largest gold nugget ever found in Alaska (294.1 troy oz) was recovered from Swift Creek in 1998. The placers are mostly deeply buried, and most were originally worked with shafts and drifts. Dozens of creeks in the district were mined, many more bear gold prospects. Cassiterite, platinum, scheelite, allanite, and native bismuth have been recovered along with gold from placer mines in the district.

==== Hot Springs District ====
This district, which produced about 576,000 ounces, includes placer mines at Manley and Eureka.

==== Rampart district ====
Nearly 200,000 ounces of gold was recovered from placer mines in the district.

==== Circle district ====
Circle mining district
- Location within Alaska
- Coordinates: 65°00′N 144°00′W

Over 1 million ounces of gold have been recovered from placer deposits in the Circle district. Uplands with thousands of feet of generally mild relief are underlain by a complex metamorphic terrane intruded by a broad range of igneous rocks. Many gold occurrences are known, but no gold lodes are identified. Placer mining has been reported for every year since 1894.

==== Eagle district ====
This small district includes the village of Eagle on the Yukon River, and borders Canada. About 50,000 ounces of gold, all from placer deposits, has been recovered from the district since gold was discovered in 1895 on American Creek and the Seventy-mile River.

==== Tolovana-Livengood district ====
Livengood is about 50 miles (80 km) northwest of Fairbanks on the Dalton Highway. In July, 1914 Jay Livengood and N.R. Hudson discovered gold on Livengood Creek. Hundreds of people arrived in the district the following winter. A post office existed at Livengood from 1915 to 1957. Only a few dozen people live at Livengood today, some only seasonally. A variety of creeks in the district were mined. Many gold lode occurrences are known and exploration continues for open pittable lode deposits. Over 500,000 ounces of gold have been recovered from placers in the district.

Early development and production was from relatively shallow pay in tributaries of Livengood Creek. By 1939, large, deeply buried (80 to 110 feet), thawed, bench placer deposits on the northwest limit of Livengood Creek valley were defined. The pay streak varied from 100 to 1,000 feet (300 m) wide and was at least 6 miles (9.7 km) long. Gold reserves of over 1 million ounces were defined by drilling prior to 1940. A dredge operated near the town of Livengood in 1940, 1946 and probably other years.

Alaska's 12th-largest (73 troy ounces) and 16th-largest (56 troy ounces) nuggets were found in the district, on Dome Creek.

==== Fairbanks district ====
Placer mining began near Fairbanks in July 1902, after Felix Pedro (real name Felice Pedroni), an Italian immigrant and Tom Gilmore discovered gold in the hills north of the Tanana and Chena Rivers in 1901. The district was and is a major producer of gold from both placer and lode deposits: placers have produced over 8 million troy ounces (250 tonnes) of gold, lodes have yielded over 4 million ounces.

==== Goodpaster district ====
Only a few thousand ounces of gold from placer mines, and a few hundred ounces from lode gold mines were produced from the Goodpaster district before the discovery of Pogo. The district is east of the Fairbanks and south of the Circle district.

===== Pogo mine =====
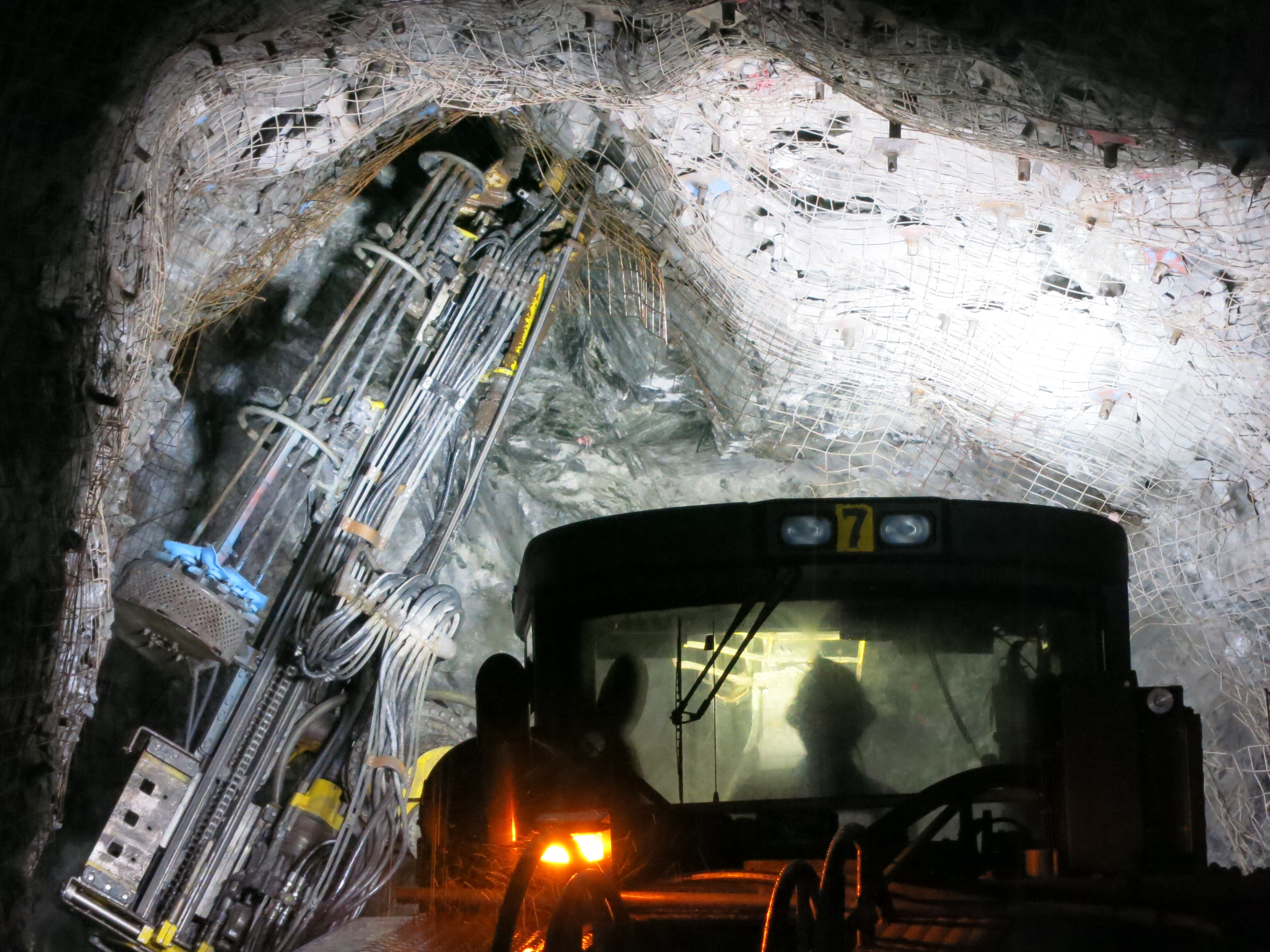
Northern Star's Pogo underground gold mine

The Pogo mine is located on a hillside above the Goodpaster River, about 85 miles (137 km) southeast of Fairbanks, Alaska. The deposit was discovered in 1995 by Sumitomo Metal Mining and Sumitomo Corporation on land owned by the State of Alaska. A private 49-mile (79 km) gravel access road and power line connects the mine to the Richardson Highway near Delta Junction. The mine is an underground operation that exploits two large (several meters thick) and high-grade gold-bearing quartz veins. Approximately half of the tailings are returned underground, the rest is interred in a dry stack tailings facility on the surface. The mine was developed, and originally operated, by Teck Cominco. Sumitomo Metal Mining (a non-operating partner and part-owner of the Pogo deposit since discovery) bought Teck's share of the mine in 2009. Sumitomo sold the mine to Northern Star Resources in 2018.

The mine was permitted in 2003 and the first gold ore bar was poured on February 12, 2006. 340 company employees and more than 200 contract employees were employed at the mine in 2018. The mine has estimated indicated and inferred mineral resources of 4.15 million ounces of gold at a grade of 14.7 g/t (JORC).

==== Fortymile district ====
Fortymile mining district
- Location within Alaska
- Coordinates: 64°00′N 142°00′W

The 1886 discovery of gold on Franklin's Bar on the Fortymile River touched off Interior Alaska's first gold rush. The mining boom ushered in a wave of settlement that forever changed the place, not only for its new residents but for the Athabascan Indians who occupied this region long before them. The miners who prospected nearly every creek in the region eventually extracted more than a half-million ounces of gold from the Fortymile, including a 56.8 troy ounce nugget, Alaska's 15th-largest. Reports of starvation and lawlessness among the miners resulted in the Army sending troops to the Eagle area to provide law enforcement in 1899. Soldiers soon began work on a trail from Valdez to Eagle.

Gold was first discovered in the Chicken Creek drainage in 1896, 10 years after the gold discovery on the Fortymile River. The F.E. Company, a subsidiary of the U.S. Smelting Refining & Mining Co., acquired most of the claims during the 1940s and dredged 2 miles (3.2 km) of the creek from 1959 to 1967. Since then, several family operations have mined on the creek. It is estimated that over 100,000 ounces of gold has been produced from the Chicken Creek drainage.

The beginning of the end of the Fortymile Gold Rush came in August 1896 when George Carmack reported the first gold strike along the Klondike River in Canada. Within a few years the once-booming towns in the Fortymile region were abandoned and forgotten. Some of the original Fortymile miners returned to the area after the Klondike Gold Rush passed. From 1887 to 1890 the Upper Yukon region was the richest and most productive mining area in the region. During those three years the area produced 1,200,000 ounces of gold, accounting for 5 percent of Alaska's total gold production.

==== Chisana-White River district ====
Gold production from this area is balanced between 78,000 ounces of placer and 66,000 ounces of lode gold. Directly south of the Fortymile district, the Chisana district includes headwaters of the Nabesna and White rivers, and tributaries of the Tanana River; it includes parts of the Wrangell Mountains and the Alaska Range. Difficulties of location, lack of water, and small deposit size limited placer activity. The Nabesna underground lode mine produced gold-copper-silver ore between 1930 and WWII.

==== Kantishna district ====
The Kantishna Gold Rush began soon after The Nome Nugget printed the headline “FOUND HIGH GRADE GOLD” on September 9, 1903. Located on the north flanks of Denali, the District was a hard place to operate a mine. Nevertheless, some of the largest gold nuggets found in Alaska have been found in the area, including the 9th largest (92 troy ounces). 92,000 ounces of placer gold and 8000 ounces of gold from lode mines has come from the district. Today, the district is located within Denali National Park and Preserve.

=== Southwestern Alaska ===
==== Kuskokwim Gold Belt ====
The Kuskokwim Gold Belt (KGB, also known as the Kuskokwim Mineral Belt) is a broad loosely geologically and geographically defined swath of country arcing for approximately 300 miles (480 km) across southwest Alaska. It lies northwest of the Alaska Range and is roughly centered on the Kuskokwim River basin. Geologically it is dominated by flysch of Cretaceous-age Kuskokwim Group sediments and a variety of igneous rocks. It also includes a variety of exotic terranes. In 1913, Alfred H. Brooks described it as, "a more or less broken belt of gold-bearing rocks which stretches northeastward from Goodnews Bay parallel to the lower course of the Kuskokwim, toward the Iditarod District, and a number of streams traversing this belt carry auriferous gravels." The KGB lies mostly within the southwestern part of the Tintina Gold Province or "Golden Arch" which lies roughly between the Denali-Farewell and Kaltag-Tintina fault systems and arcs up from southwest Alaska, through central Alaska, and down across the Yukon Territory to British Columbia.

The KGB includes all or parts of the historic Aniak/Tuluksak, Anvik, Bethel, Goodnews Bay, Iditarod-Flat, Innoko, Marshall, McGrath, Ruby, and Tolstoi mining districts, as well as newly realized gold-rich areas. Over 3.2 million ounces of gold have been recovered from the belt.

The first mineral discovery by the Russians in Alaska (a cinnabar-stibnite deposit) occurred in the Aniak district in 1838. Pay gold was found in 1901 on tributaries of the Kuskokwim River in the Aniak district.

==== Marshall-Anvik District ====
The Marshall and Anvik districts produced about 124,000 troy ounces of gold (8,500 lb; 3,900 kg) and minor amounts of platinum, mainly from Wilson Creek. The district has the Bering Sea to the west, the Yukon River to the south, and the Iditarod and Kaiyuh districts to the east.

==== Aniak District ====
Aniak mining district
- Location within Alaska
- Coordinates: 61°00′N 159°00′W

About 220,000 ounces of gold produced, mainly from the Tuluksuk River (where the town of Nyac is located) and Crooked Creek basins and with lesser production from Wattamuse and other creeks scattered around the district. Mining continues at present, but reserves are not known. Cinnabar (mercury sulfide) occurs in many of the placer mines in this district, most notably at Cinnabar Creek.

===== Donlin Creek =====
Placer mining began on benches and tributaries on the east side of Crooked Creek and its tributary Donlin Creek in 1910; a family-scale placer-mining operation continues today. Granitic dike swarms cutting the shales and sandstones of the Kuskokwim Group rocks in the hills east of upper Crooked Creek were recognized by USGS geologists in 1915 as the probable source of the placer gold.

In the 1970s Calista Corporation, an Alaska Native Corporation, as part of its land grant under ANSCA selected the land east of Crooked Creek, based on its mineral potential. In 1986 modern hardrock exploration of the Donlin area began with WestGold's efforts, which were abandoned after two years, due not to the lack of gold, but to the refractory (technically difficult to extract from the rock) nature of the gold. PlacerDome signed a lease with Calista and began exploration at Donlin in 1995. That effort continues today, having evolved to a 50:50 partnership between Barrick Gold and NovaGold Resources, in cooperation with Calista, the landowner. Over 150 million dollars have been expended on exploration, engineering, and environmental studies.

If eventually exploited, the mine will be an open pit several miles wide. Latest estimates (April 2009) report that Donlin contains 29.3 million ounces of proven and probable gold reserves (calculated at a gold price of $750) and an additional 10 million ounces of gold resource. The gold occurs within the crystal lattice of arsenopyrite associated with other metal sulfides in veins, veinlets, and disseminations mainly in the felsic dikes, but also in less common altered mafic dikes and in the sediments.

==== Iditarod District ====
The Iditarod district lies between the lower Yukon and Kuskokwim Rivers: the Aniak district abuts it to the south. A gold rush followed the discovery of gold on Otter Creek in 1909. Over 1.5 million ounces of placer gold and a few thousand ounces of lode gold have been recovered from the Iditarod area, making it one of the more important gold-mining districts in Alaska. Much of the gold-producing ground in the district was consolidated by the Morgan-Guggenheim consortium.

===== Tolstoi District =====
The drainage basin of Tolstoi Creek, a north-flowing tributary of the Dishna, roughly defines the district. The district lies between the Iditarod and Innoko districts. Placer gold and platinum were discovered by drifting in frozen gravels 35 feet deep on Boob Creek in the winter of 1915–1916. A gold rush occurred in the district the following winter. Historic production of 11,000 ounces of gold, as well as some byproduct platinum, is recorded for the district.

==== Innoko District ====
The Aniak district lies to the south, the Tolstoi district to the west. Almost 3/4 million ounces of placer gold has been won from Innoko River and its tributaries in the district. Lode gold production of 150 ounces is also recorded. Cripple, Colorado, Yankee, Games, Ophir, and Little Creeks had prominent placer mines: a third of the districts production came from Ganes Creek. Gold-bearing porphyritic intrusive rocks adjacent to the Ganes Creek and Colorado Creek placers are similar in composition and age to the dike swarms at 29-million ounce Donlin Creek.

===== Ganes Creek =====
The property is located approximately 40 km west of McGrath, and 440 km northwest of Anchorage. Games is famous for producing spectacular gold nuggets including the 5th (122 troy ounces) and 13th-largest (62.5 troy ounce) in Alaska. The presence of cobble-size quartz with sulfide boxwork and coarse gold suggest that the placer gold is primary, originating from bedrock sources. Historical production figures from Ganes Creek are in excess of 250,000 oz. gold; an additional estimated resource of 736,000 oz. of placer gold exists on patented claims.

==== McGrath-McKinley district ====
Almost 200,000 ounces of lode gold and over 130,000 ounces of placer gold have come from the district. The district lies on the northeast side of the Aniak district.

===== Nixon Fork mine =====
The Nixon Fork mine was an underground lode gold-copper mine located 32 miles (51 km) northeast of McGrath, Alaska. Placer gold was discovered nearby in 1917, by 1918 hardrock mining was underway, and continued intermittently until 1964. Ore consists of shoots of massive sulfides and native gold found with skarns along the contact of sedimentary rocks and the Mystery Creek quartz monzonite stock. The mine was reopened by Nevada Goldfields, Inc. in 1995 and operated until 1999. In 2005 resource and exploration development resumed. Gold production occurred in 2006 and 2007, and again from 2011 to 2013. Production has totaled 187,000 ounces of gold, 2,190,000 pounds of copper, and at least 11,000 ounces of silver.

==== Goodnews Bay District ====
Goodnews Bay mining district
- Location within Alaska
- Coordinates: 59°20′N 161°00′W

The district is in extreme southwestern Alaska, and borders the Bering Sea. About 600,000 ounces of platinum (plus some iridium, osmium, ruthenium, palladium, and rhenium) and 27,000 ounces of gold were won from placer deposits in the Salmon River from 1934 to 1976. Present reserves are unknown, but are the subject of ongoing exploration. The source of the platinum-group elements appears to be in the Red Mountain and Susie Mountain ultramafic rocks. Extensive geochemical and geophysical surveys during the past several years have identified areas with as much as 0.1 ounce per ton platinum in the soils, but no reserve has been demonstrated.

=== Seward Peninsula ===
Surveyors belonging to the 1865 Count Bendeleben expedition exploring a route across Siberia, the Bering Sea, and Alaska for a communications cable reported gold in the Fish River area of the Seward Peninsula. But it was not until the 1898 $1500-to-the-pan strike on Anvil Creek that gold-seekers came to the region.

==== Nome (Cape Nome) district ====
Placer gold deposits on Anvil Creek and on the Snake River, a few miles from the future site of Nome, were discovered in 1898 by Jafet Lindeberg, Erik Lindblom and John Brynteson, the "Three Lucky Swedes". Word of the strike caused a major gold rush to Nome in the spring of 1899. Over 3.6 million ounces of gold have been recovered from the Nome district, almost all of it from placer deposits. The Rock Creek mine, owned by Bering Straits Native Corporation, was constructed in 2007 by NovaGold Resources. The mine began producing gold in September 2008, but permanently ceased in November 2008 due to difficulties with the ore crushing and grinding circuit. It is now in closure and reclamation mode.

==== Council-Solomon District ====
Council mining district
- Location within Alaska
- Coordinates: 64°40′N 164°19′W

Over a million ounces of gold are reported recovered from the district.

==== Fairhaven Inmachuk District ====
The Fairhaven-Inmachuk district lies north of the Solomon District and extends north to Kotzebue Sound of the Chukchi Sea. The district (including Candle) produced about 600,000 ounces of gold with minor amounts of chromium, copper, lead, platinum, bismuth, tungsten, mercury, molybdenum, silver, and rare-earth elements.

==== Kougarok district ====
The district is the central part of the Seward Peninsula, draining into the Imruck Basin. Gold was discovered in 1900 and production from placer mines continues to this day. 177,000 ounces of gold have been recovered from the Kougarok district.

==== Koyuk district ====
84,000 ounces of placer gold came from the district, the southeastern part of the Seward Peninsula. Major producers were; the Ungalik River and its tributary, Bonanza Creek, which produced significant by-product tin, and Dime Creek, which also produced significant platinum. The district encompasses the basins of the Koyuk, Inglutalik, Ungalik, and Shaktoolik Rivers, all draining into northeastern Norton Sound.

==== Port Clarence district ====
Mainly a tin district, the westernmost Seward Peninsula, 42,000 ounces of placer gold have been recovered, much of it as a by-product of tin mining.

=== Southcentral Alaska ===
==== Resurrection Creek ====
Resurrection Creek was the site of Alaska's first gold rush in the late 1890s, and placer mining continues today. The Resurrection Creek watershed drains 161 square miles (420 km^{2}) on the north side of the Kenai Peninsula, and the community of Hope, Alaska is located at the mouth of Resurrection Creek. Charles Miller located the first claim on Resurrection Creek; then leased it to others for working. By 1893, about a dozen miners were working claims on Resurrection Creek. In 1894, more claims were established on Resurrection Creek.

==== Valdez Creek ====
Gold was first discovered near Valdez Creek in 1897 by W.G. Jack and his party, but they were forced to abandon the area soon after their discovery. The gold was then rediscovered on August 15, 1903. Valdez Creek, a tributary of the Susitna River, is located in central Alaska northeast of milepost 81 on the Denali Highway. A 52-troy ounce nugget (Alaska's 18th-largest) came from Lucky Gulch, a tributary of Valdez Creek. Cambior's Valdez Creek Mine recovered over 75,000 ounces of gold annually, making it the largest placer operation in North America in 1992. Produced 459,162 ounces of gold from 1984 to 1995. Substantial reserves remain upstream of the active mine. The mine has been shut down and the site reclaimed, but other small-scale placer and lode deposits remain nearby.

==== Chulitna-Yentna Mineral Belt ====
The Chulitna-Yentna mineral belt extends northeastward for 100 miles (160 km) or more along the southern flank of the west-central Alaska Range. The belt shares tectonic or compositional features comparable with some well-known mineral belts of the western Cordillera, including the Juneau gold belt.

==== Chulitna District ====
===== Golden Zone Mine =====
Golden Zone Mine. (Copper, gold, silver, arsenic, zinc). Pipe-like body produced 1,581 ounces of gold, 8,617 ounces of silver, and 21 tons of copper. Recent work indicates reserves of the Pipe, Bunkhouse and Copper King deposits as 13.3 million tons grading 0.095 ounces per ton of gold.

==== Yentna Cache-Creek District ====
Gold was discovered in the Yentna District (also known as the Cache Creek District) of the upper Susitna Valley in 1898, soon followed by claim staking. Placer mining was reported in the Cache Creek drainage of the Dutch Hills by 1906. Quaternary glaciofluvial deposits, alluvial deposits, and Tertiary conglomeratic white quartz-breccia units have been mined in the Dutch Hills. About 200,000 ounces (6.2 tonnes) of gold has been produced from these placer deposits.

==== Willow Creek Mining District ====
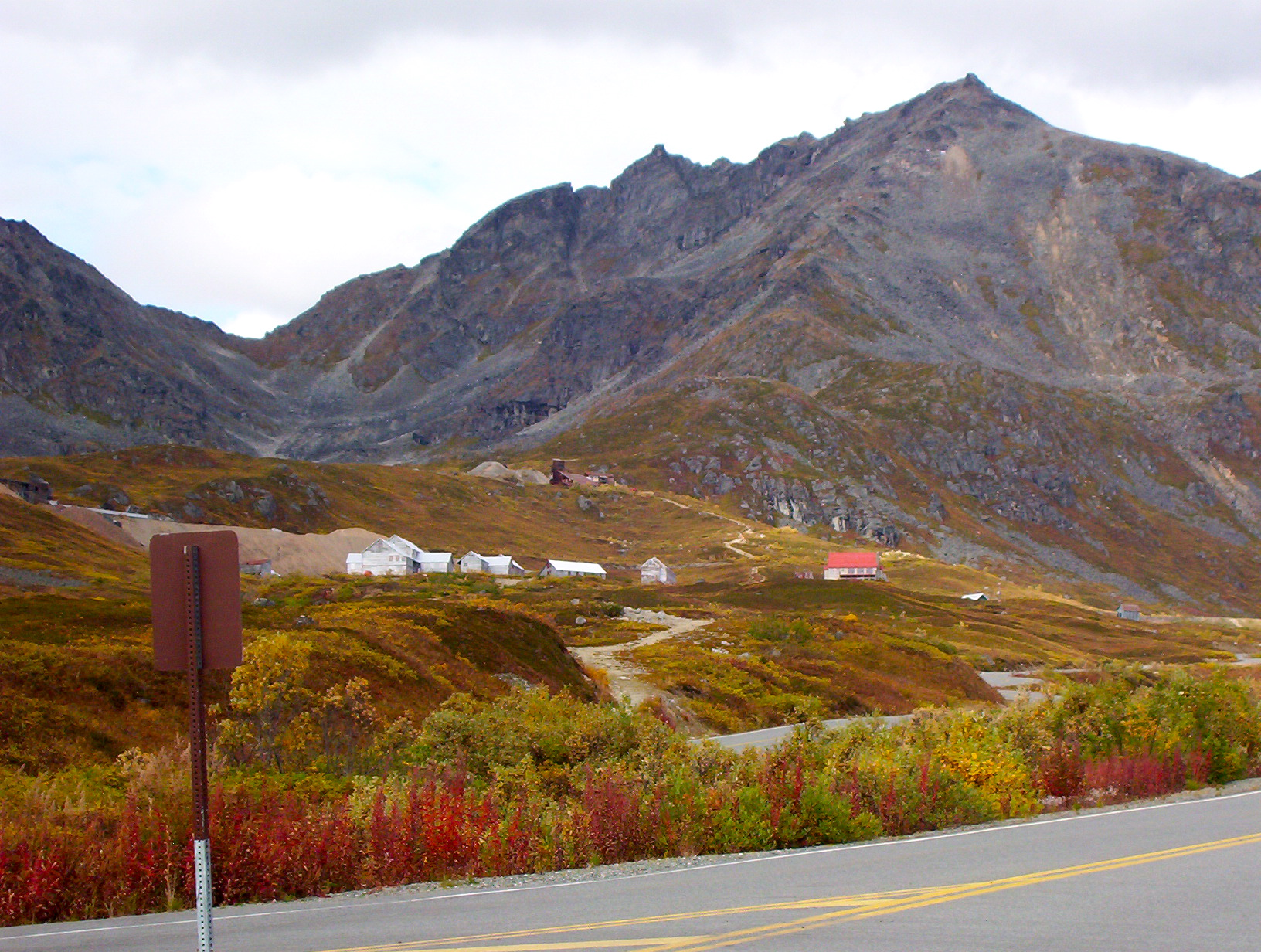
Independence Mine State Historical Park, in Hatcher Pass

Gold was first reported in what would become the Willow Creek Mining District (also known as the Independence Mine/Hatcher Pass District) by Robert Hatcher. Hatcher discovered and staked the first lode gold claim in the Willow Creek Valley in September 1906. Through 2006 the district produced 609,000 ounces of hard rock gold and 58,841 ounces of placer gold.

=== Northwestern Alaska ===
Drainage basins emptying into Kotzebue Sound of the Bering Sea, including the Noatak River and Kobuk River, define the Kiana, Shungnak, Noatak, and Selawick districts. The Noatak district is now within the Noatak National Preserve, only tiny gold placer production was recorded from some tributaries near the Noatak headwaters. The Selawick district has one creek where gold was produced by a 2-man operation for ten years during the 1950s and 1960s.

Kiana and Shugnak mining district
- Location within Alaska
- Coordinates: 67°00′N 159°00′W

==== Kobuk River district ====
In 1898, placer and lode gold were discovered on several of the Kobuk River's tributaries. This gold strike (which by some accounts was false) attracted nearly 2,000 people to Alaska, though only 800 actually stayed to find gold. Although mining has continued to take place in this area, little gold has been discovered.

==== Kiana district ====
Placer gold was discovered on Klery Creek in 1909. Almost all of the gold, over 40,000 ounces, from this area has come from tributaries of the Squirrel River. Mining has been nearly continuous in this area since discovery. Nephrite jade also occurs in this area.

==== Shungnak district ====
All of the 15,000 ounces of gold recovered came from streams draining the Cosmos Hills, a low range along the Kobuk Valley. Gold was discovered on Dahl Creek in 1898, which was the major producer. Copper, chromium, cadmium, and silver, were also recovered with the gold.

== Recreational gold mining in Alaska ==
Recreational mining, i.e., small-scale prospecting and mining using gold pans, sluiceboxes, rockers, suction dredges, and metal detectors, is enjoying a resurgence in Alaska.

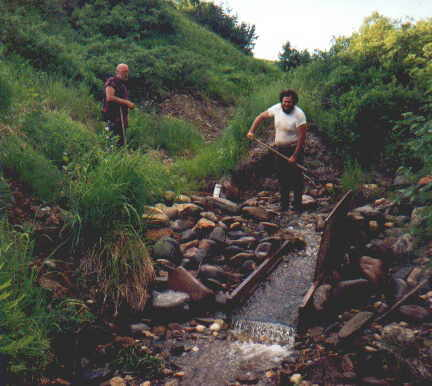
Miners working a sluice on Lucky Gulch, Blue Ribbon Mine, Alaska

There are many commercial ventures that charge fees to recreational miners located on historically rich placer ground, some are road-accessible, many are in remote fly-in locations, most offer lodging and a complete suite of services. Some State and Federal lands in Alaska are open to recreational mining with specific regulations. Popular areas include; areas of Chugach National Forest, areas within Alaska State Parks such as Chugach State Park, Kenai State Parks, and Independence Mine State Historical Park, the Caribou Creek recreational mining area along the Glenn Highwayand along the Dalton Highway.

The Hatcher Pass Public Use Area is located approximately fifteen miles north of Palmer on the Little Susitna River. The area is open to a variety of recreational activities, including recreational mining. A fact sheet provides details on recreational mining within the Hatcher Pass Public Use Area.

Near Fairbanks, both the Pedro Creek area (about 15 miles north of Fairbanks and the site of the original Fairbanks gold discovery by Felix Pedro in 1902) and Nome Creek area within the White Mountains National Recreation Area (approximately 60 miles north of Fairbanks). Gold mining on Nome Creek began in 1900 and was followed by a gold rush.

The Petersville State Recreational Mining Area

== See also ==
- Natural resources of the Arctic
- Gold mining in the United States
