= Murray Brook Mine =

Mine in New Brunswick, Canada

- Location in New Brunswick
- Location: Restigouche County, New Brunswick, Canada; 47°31′34″N 66°25′53″W
- Products: Gold, Silver
- Production: 1.014 Mtonnes ore
- Opened: 1989
- Closed: 1992
- Company: NovaGold Resources Inc
- Website: http://www.novagold.net/

The Murray Brook Mine is a VMS deposit in the Bathurst Mining Camp (BMC) of northern New Brunswick, Canada owned by NovaGold Resources. The deposit was discovered in 1955 and contains the largest gossan zone in the BMC. From 1989 to 1992 the gossan zone was processed for gold and silver. In 1992 copper rich ore was crushed and tested for heap leaching.

== See also ==
- Volcanogenic massive sulfide ore deposit
