= Atlantic Cable Quartz Lode =

- Location within Montana Location within the United States
- Location: Deer Lodge County, Montana, United States; 46°10′08″N 113°09′40″W

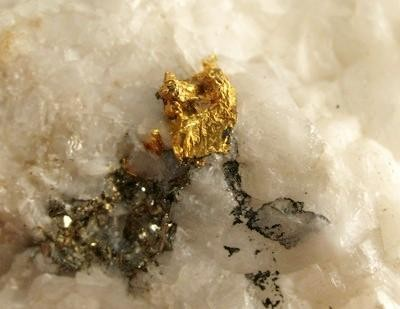
6 mm. gold crystal cluster on milky quartz, from the Atlantic Cable Quartz Lode

The Atlantic Cable Quartz Lode is a gold mine in Deer Lodge County, Montana. The mine is located in the southwestern area of Montana, between Drummond and Anaconda along the Pintler Scenic Route on Montana Highway 1, east of Georgetown Lake.

The gold mine was named on June 15, 1867, with the name commemorating the completion of the laying of the second transatlantic cable. The mine's founders were Alexander Aiken, John B. Pearson and Jonas Stough. They were camped on Flint Creek and their horses had drifted off. In tracking them to this location, the men were led to the discovery of the mine. Machinery for the first mill was imported from Swansea, Wales, and moved by wagon team from Corinne, Utah, the nearest railroad terminal.

In the 19th century, mining was irregular. The town which grew up around the mine, Cable, Montana, boomed and busted four distinct times: 1867–1869, 1873–1878, 1883–1891 and 1902–1940. The Atlantic Cable Quartz Lode mine was operated with varying success until about 1880, when extremely rich ore was located. A 500-foot piece of ground produced $6,500,000 in gold. W. A. Clark paid $19,000 for one chunk of ore taken from this mine in 1889 and claimed it was the largest gold nugget ever found.

In 1902, two brothers cleaned up the mine and obtained $18,000 from the first cleanup. By 1906, three shifts a day were running in the mill. By 1940, the mine was inactive and has remained that way.

== See also ==
- Gold mining in the United States
- Gold prospecting
- Gold rush
