= Fairbanks mining district =

- Alaska Mining District
- Location within Alaska
- Coordinates: 64°40′N 148°00′W

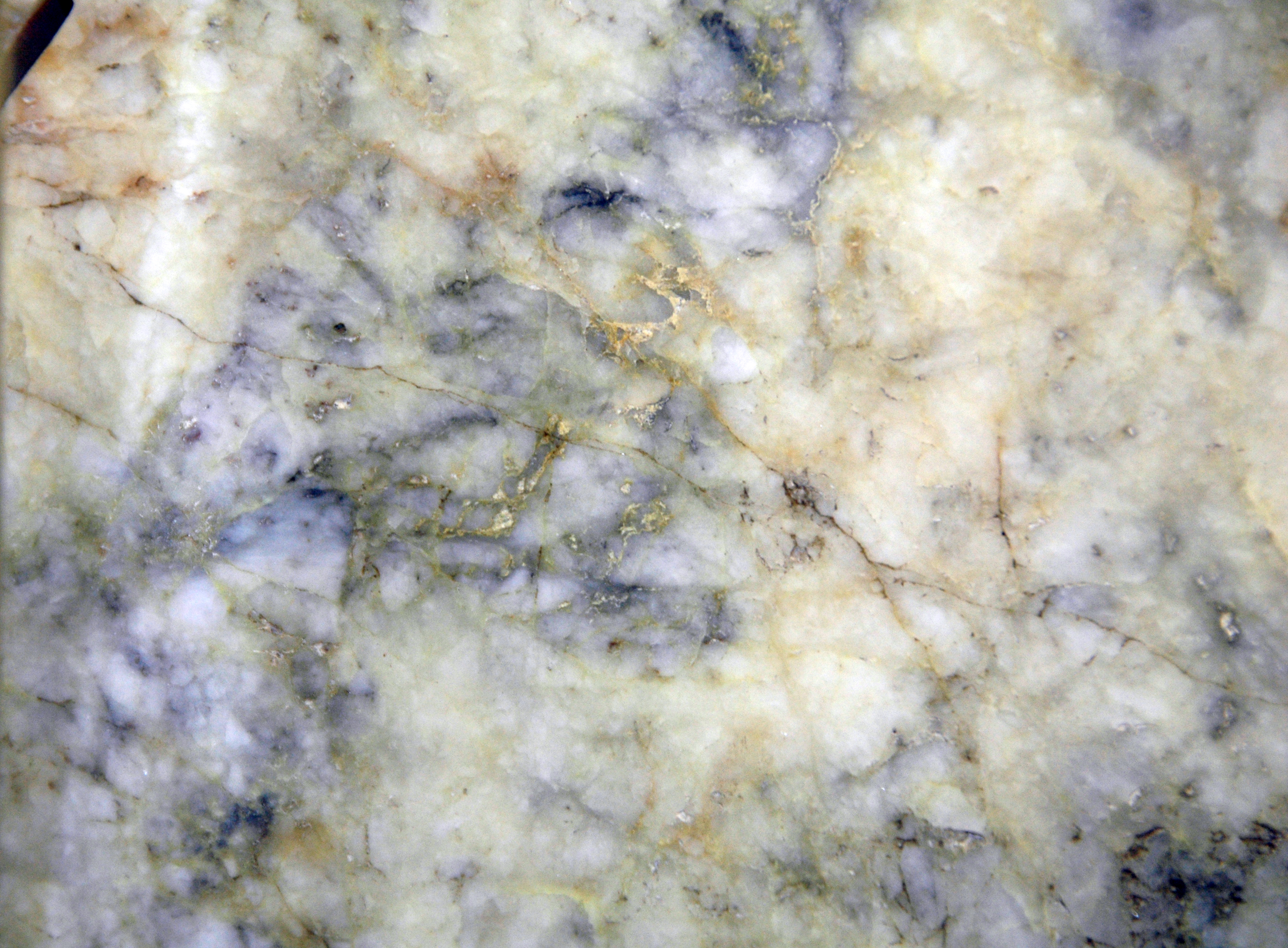
Gold-quartz-sulfide hydrothermal vein at the old Grant Mine, Fairbanks Mining District

The Fairbanks mining district is a gold-mining area in the U.S. state of Alaska. Placer mining began near Fairbanks in July 1902, after Felix Pedro (real name Felice Pedroni), an Italian immigrant and Tom Gilmore discovered gold in the hills north of the Tanana and Chena Rivers in 1901. Pedro died exactly eight years after finding the richest gold placer he would ever know. By 1903 a new rush started, and prospectors staked thousands of claims. However, mining results were disappointing during the summer of 1903, with little gold recovered. Then Dennis O'Shea struck it rich on Fairbanks Creek, No. 8 Above. This was one of the richest claims in the Fairbanks Mining District and paid as high as $136 to the pan (gold @ $20/ounce). Discoveries on Cleary and Ester Creeks followed, and almost two-thirds of the gold mined in the Tanana hills before 1910 came from these three creeks. Total production of gold was more than $30 million. Towns grew on every creek with a combined population of 1,600 residents.

The district was and is a major producer of gold from both placer and lode deposits: placers have produced over 8 million troy ounces (250 t) of gold, lodes have yielded over 4 million ounces (110 t).

== Ft. Knox mine (operating) ==
Today, the largest gold producer in Alaska is the Fort Knox Gold Mine, an open-pit mine 26 miles (42 km) north of Fairbanks in the Fairbanks mining district. Gold occurs in a Cretaceous porphyritic granodiorite pluton as finely-distributed particles in and on the edges of small quartz veinlets and swarms. A NW structural fabric partially controls vein orientations. Sulfide content is low. Ore is low-grade, averaging only 0.024 ounces (0.68 g) of gold per ton of ore. Creeks draining the pluton were among the many productive gold placers in the heart of the Fairbanks district, since the early 1900s; and bedrock occurrences of gold or bismuth/telluride minerals were found near the pluton by early miners. Bulk-tonnage potential of the pluton was not known until exploration in the 1980s. Mine construction began in 1995, gold production commenced in 1997 with 3.8 million ounces (110 t) of gold resource estimated. In 2006 gold reserves equaled 2.7 million ounces (77 t) with additional resources of 1.6 million ounces (45 t) of gold. A heap-leaching component is being added to the original carbon-in-pulp vat leaching gold-recovery process. The mine and mill employ approximately 400 people on two shifts, 24 hours per day, 365 days per year. The Fort Knox mine produced 333 thousand troy ounces (10.4 t) of gold in 2006.

The True North mine is a recently developed, and now suspended, open pit operation that delivered its ore to the mill at Fort Knox. It is located 25 miles (40 km) northeast of Fairbanks, on the northwest flank of Pedro Dome and approximately 11 miles (18 km) from the Ft. Knox Mine. Both True North and Ft. Knox are owned by Fairbanks Gold Mining Incorporated, a subsidiary of Kinross Gold Corporation.

== See also ==
- Fairbanks Gold Rush
- Gold mining in Alaska
