= Galore Creek mine =

Copper-gold deposit in British Columbia, Canada

Galore Creek project
- Galore Creek mine in British Columbia
- Location: Regional District of Kitimat–Stikine, British Columbia, Canada; 57°07′35″N 131°27′14″W
- Products: Copper, gold, silver
- Company: Teck Resources (50%) Newmont (50%)
- Website: www.gcmc.ca
- Acquired: 2018

The Galore Creek project is one of the largest undeveloped copper-gold deposits in Canada and in the world. The deposit is located in northwestern British Columbia along Galore Creek, a tributary of the Scud River, which in turn empties into the Stikine River. The deposit, situated within an alkalic, silica-undersaturated igneous intrusive complex, has estimated metal contents of 12 billion pounds of copper, 10.7 million oz of gold and 183.1 million oz of silver. It was owned 50% by Teck Resources and 50% by NovaGold Resources until 2018, when Newmont purchased NovaGold's share.

The project is currently in care and maintenance status, managing critical safety, environmental and regulatory compliance activities.
