= Scud River =

River in British Columbia

- Mouth of the Scud River

Location
- Country: Canada
- Province: British Columbia
- District: Cassiar Land District

Physical characteristics
- Source: Scud Glacier
  - location: Boundary Ranges
  - coordinates: 57°23′57″N 131°22′59″W
  - elevation: 1,170 m (3,840 ft)
- Mouth: Stikine River
  - coordinates: 57°16′47″N 131°49′22″W
  - elevation: 65 m (213 ft)
- Length: 62 km (39 mi)
- Basin size: 1,152 km^{2} (445 sq mi),
- Discharge
  - average: 110 m^{3}/s (3,900 cu ft/s)

Basin features
- Tributaries
  - left: Middle Scud Creek, Galore Creek, Contact Creek, Fishbone Creek, Devils Club Creek
  - right: Navo Creek
- Topo map: NTS104G Telegraph Creek

The Scud River is a tributary of the Stikine River in the northern part of the province of British Columbia, Canada. From its source at Scud Glacier in the Boundary Ranges of the Coast Mountains, the Scud River flows generally south and west for about 62 km (39 mi) to join the Stikine River.

The Scud's drainage basin covers 1,152 km^{2} (445 sq mi). The river's mean annual discharge is estimated at 110 m^{3}/s (3,900 cu ft/s), with most of the flow occurring between May and November. The Scud River's watershed's land cover is classified as 41.9% snow/glacier, 26.4% barren, 20.6% conifer forest, and small amounts of other cover. The mouth of the Scud River is located about 62 km (39 mi) north of Stikine, British Columbia, about 80 km (50 mi) southwest of the community of Telegraph Creek, about 190 km (120 mi) southeast of Juneau, Alaska, and about 340 km (210 mi) north of Prince Rupert, British Columbia.

The Scud River's drainage basin lies within the asserted traditional territory of the Tahltan First Nations people.

== Geography ==
The Scud River originates as meltwater from Scud Glacier. Scud Glacier runs southward from high peaks of the Boundary Range, including Dokdaon Mountain, Endeavor Mountain, and Ambition Mountain. After emerging from the toe of Scud Glacier the Scud River flows south for about 10 km (6.2 mi) to its confluence with Middle Scud Creek, which flows from glaciers on the slopes of Scud Peak and Mount Hickman to the northwest. The Scud River continues south for a few kilometers before turning west at the confluence of an unnamed tributary joining from the south. After flowing west for a few more kilometers, the Scud River is joined from the south by Galore Creek. Galore Creek has several tributaries, including Dendritic Creek.

The Scud River continues west and northwest for about 10 km (6.2 mi), where it is joined from the south by Contact Creek. Over the next several kilometers the Scud River passes south of Recumbent Mountain, and is joined by Navo Creek from the north, then Fishbone Creek and Devils Club Creek, from the north. In its last few kilometers, the Scud River runs close to the Stikine River, where there is a portage called Scud Portage. The lower Scud River passes between Cone Mountain and Mount Pereleshin.

For most of its course, the Scud River is heavily braided, with fluvioglacial features resulting from the retreating glaciers of the region.

== History ==
The Scud River lies within the traditional territory of the Tahltan First Nations people. The Tahltan people have occupied the territory since time immemorial.

The Tahltan people suffered major population and cultural losses from smallpox epidemics in 1832-1838 and 1847-1849.

In 1861 gold was discovered along the Stikine River, triggering the Stikine Gold Rush. The rush was fairly small, but it resulted in the creation of the Stickeen Territories, which was separated from the Hudson's Bay Company controlled North-Western Territory and merged into the Colony of British Columbia. Later the Stickeen Territories were dissolved, but the region remained part of British Columbia.

In the 1870s the Cassiar Gold Rush occurred near Dease Lake. The influx of miners into the region brought infectious diseases like measles and large amounts of alcohol, causing a further erosion of Tahltan culture, population, and traditional ways of life. The Tahltan people, whose population had fallen to several hundred, congregated at a communal village near the confluence of the Stikine and Tahltan Rivers, not far from Telegraph Creek. In the 1890s the Klondike Gold Rush resulted in many more miners passing through the region. It also resulted in Christian missionaries working to convert the Tahltan people to Christianity.

In the mid-late 20th century several mining companies prospected the Scud River basin for mining possibilities, including Kennco Copper, Silver Standard Mines Ltd., Homestake Mineral Development Company, Yukon Minerals Corporations, and others. A number of mining claims were made, the most significant being in the upper reaches of the Scud River tributary Galore Creek. Today the Galore Creek mine project remains undeveloped but the Galore Creek Mining Corporation is conducting feasibility and environmental studies with the goal of developing the mine.

== See also ==
- List of rivers of British Columbia
