= Admiralty mining district =

- Alaska Mining District
- Location within Alaska
- Coordinates: 58°05′N 134°38′W
- Country: United States
- State: Alaska

The Admiralty mining district is a mining area in the U.S. state of Alaska which consists of Admiralty Island. Silver and base metals are mined, with gold recovered as a by-product.

The Alaska Empire underground lode mine recovered gold from quartz veins in metamorphic rocks. Discovered and staked in the 1920s, production of about 20,000 tons of 0.25 ounce-per-ton gold ore occurred in the mid-1930s. No significant placer mining was done on Admiralty Island. About 500,000 ounces of gold, almost all from Greens Creek, have been recovered from the Admiralty district.

== Greens Creek mine (operating) ==
The Greens Creek mine in the Admiralty mining district is the 5th largest silver producer in the world; gold is a byproduct. The mine is an underground operation, with surface disposal of tailings onto two 29-acre (120,000 m^{2}) sites. The mine and mill site lie on 18 patented claims; the mine has mineral rights to 24 square miles (15,360 acres) of surrounding land owned by the Federal government. It is located approximately 20 miles (32 km) south of Juneau, Alaska, on Admiralty Island within the Admiralty Island National Monument. The mine produces silver, gold, zinc and lead from a structurally and mineralogically complex VMS deposit. Geologists discovered zinc anomalous stream sediments in the Greens Creek basin in 1973. Follow-up in 1974 led to discovery of a hillside secondary iron oxide gossan containing highly anomalous lead, zinc and silver. Core drilling to test the unoxidized bedrock under the gossan was initiated in 1975 and penetrated a 82 feet (25 m) thick lens of massive sulfide mineralisation. An extensive exploration drilling program began after the discovery hole and positive results led to full-scale development beginning in 1987 and production of metal concentrates in 1989. Production was halted due to low metal prices, for a few years in the mid-'90s. Concentrates are trucked 8 miles (13 km) from the mine/mill complex to a port on Hawk Inlet; from there they are shipped worldwide for smelting and refining.

In 2020 Greens Creek produced 10.5 million troy ounces of silver, 48,500 troy ounces of gold, 56,800 tons of zinc and 21,400 tons of lead. Proven and Probable Reserves at Greens Creek in 2020 were 111.4 million troy ounces of silver, 828,000 troy ounces of gold, and 652,420 tons of zinc contained in 8.978 million tons of ore grading approximately 12 opt silver, 0.09 opt gold, 7.4% zinc, and 2.8% lead. Exploration continues on surrounding lands. The mine is the largest taxpayer in the Juneau Borough. Two hundred and eighty people are employed by the mine, three-quarters of whom are residents of Southeast Alaska. Most mine workers commute from Juneau on a high-speed ferry operated by the company, which departs Juneau at 5:00AM and 5:00PM daily.

Metal sulfides were deposited by hydrothermal fluids on or in the sea floor of a tectonically-active basin. The deposit exhibits features of both VMS and SEDEX models. Most of the ore body is zinc-lead-silver-gold rich; some zones have elevated copper values. The deposit is hosted in metamorphosed, multiply deformed, and hydrothermally-altered mainly marine Triassic sediments and mafic volcanic rocks within the exotic Alexander terrane. Mineralization occurs as discontinuous vein or blanket-like bodies of laminated or replacement-textured massive sulfides; roughly along a structural lithology contact in the sediments. Pyrite, sphalerite, galena, and tetrahedrite/tennantite are the major sulfide minerals.

== See also ==
Gold mining in Alaska
