= NovaGold Resources =

Canadian mining company

NOVAGOLD
- Type: Public
- Traded as: TSX: NG; AMEX: NG
- Industry: Mineral exploration
- Founded: December 5, 1984
- Headquarters: Vancouver, British Columbia, Canada
- Key people: Gerald McConnell (CEO 1984-1999); Rick Van Nieuwenhuyse (CEO 1999-2012); Greg Lang (CEO 2012-current)
- Products: Gold
- Subsidiaries: NOVAGOLD Resources (Bermuda) Limited; Donlin Gold LLC (50%)
- Website: www.novagold.com

NOVAGOLD is a Canadian company that is pursuing the development of the Donlin Gold mine in Alaska. Headquartered in Vancouver, the company is listed on the NYSE American and the Toronto Stock Exchange. The company was founded in Dartmouth, Nova Scotia, in 1984, to pursue exploration and development of mining properties. While the company bought and sold numerous exploration rights across North America, they have principally focused on four properties. They developed and operated the Murray Brook Mine in Nova Scotia from 1989 to 1992 and developed the Rock Creek Mine in Alaska but defaulted on financial obligations forcing it to close shortly after opening in 2008. They conducted exploration and development work on the Galore Creek mine in British Columbia between 2003 and 2018 but sold its interests. The development of the Donlin Gold mine has been pursued since the formation of a joint venture with Barrick Gold in 2012.

== Corporate history ==
NovaCan Mining Resources was founded in 1984 in Dartmouth, Nova Scotia. The company was renamed to NOVAGOLD Resources Inc. in 1987, as it became listed on the Toronto Stock Exchange with a $2.5 million initial public offering. The company raised additional funds through private placements and they were able to buy and sell numerous mineral exploration properties. They were able to successfully acquire and develop the Murray Brook Mine. It was a small, low-grade mine that began to commercially produced gold and silver in 1989 and despite investment of advanced technology to expand its mine life, closed to 1992 still owing debt to the National Bank of Canada who financed its construction. Seeking to expand, NOVAGOLD sought to take over, but only acquired (71%) controlling interest, in Etruscan Enterprises Ltd. for its properties in the Northwest Territories. After Rick Van Nieuwenhuyse took over as president, and later as CEO, the company purchased the Alaska Gold Co. in 1998 for its Rock Creek property in Alaska.

NOVAGOLD re-located from Dartmouth to Los Gatos, California in 2000 as it pursued an interest in business to business e-commerce with the creation of a new subsidiary company called NovaXchange. However, by 2002, with all its mineral assets located in Alaska and Yukon, the company had re-located again to Vancouver. In 2003 it was listed on the American Stock Exchange. NOVAGOLD acquired SpectrumGold Inc. which had control of several mining prospects in Yukon. Before they were amalgamated, NOVAGOLD used SpectrumGold to purchase RioTinto and Anglo American's Galore Creek property in northwest British Columbia for US$20 million on condition of a pre-feasibility study (that evaluates mining options) was completed. SpectrumGold also acquired an 80% interest in the adjacent Copper Canyon property from Eagle Plains Resources.

With the Galore Creek and Donlin properties emerging as potentially developable mines, the stock price of NOVAGOLD had risen from $0.20 a share in 2000 to $10 in 2005. Share prices would spike to nearly $18 in July 2006 as Barrick Gold launched US$1.54-billion hostile takeover. At the time, Barrick was the world's largest gold mining company and had previously acquired Placer Dome, taking its 30% interest in the Donlin property. Several months prior Galore Creek's neighbouring owner, Pioneer Metals had filed a lawsuit against NOVAGOLD for a breach of contract and NOVAGOLD responded by seeking to acquire the company. At the same time as that Barrick made its offer to NOVAGOLD shareholders, it also made an offer that trumped NOVAGOLD's offer for Pioneer Metals. NOVAGOLD management and largest shareholders, which at the time was Neuberger Berman and Sprott Assets, resisted the takeover believing the shares to be under-priced. Barrick responded by lowering its ambition to just acquiring controlling interest (requiring only 50% of shares) as NOVAGOLD launched two lawsuits attempting to put off Barrick. Barrick successfully acquired Pioneer Metals and increased its offer to NOVAGOLD shareholders by 10%. By December Barrick was only able to acquire 14.8% of shares. A few months later, in 2007 as Barrick sold off its shares, NOVAGOLD and Teck Resources announced a 50-50 joint venture partnership to develop the Galore Creek mine and its shares peaked at $20. However, their stock price would collapse by the end of the year as an updated cost analysis revised the mine cost up to $5 billion and Teck withdrew support for proceeding at that price. A similar independent cost estimate moved Donlin project from US$2.5 to US$5 billion. Meanwhile, NOVAGOLD had developed the small Rock Creek gold mine near Nome, Alaska but it was forced to shut down shortly after beginning production as it defaulted on a loan and failed to fulfill environmental obligations. NOVAGOLD stock would bottom out under a dollar in late-2008, during the 2008 financial crisis.

NOVAGOLD rebuilt by selling a one-third stake in the company to Thomas Kaplan's Electrum Strategic Resources LLC. With this they were able to settle a class-action lawsuit by shareholder over misleading statement regarding the potential of a Galore Creek mine and buy out its partner, Copper Canyon Resources, on the adjacent property to Galore Creek. Meanwhile, they disposed of other assets to re-focused solely on advancing the development of the Galore Creek and Donlin properties. This included splitting off its copper assets to a new company called NovaCopper (later renamed Trilogy Metals) under Rick Van Nieuwenhuyse, with Greg Lang becoming the new CEO of NOVAGOLD, and selling the aborted Rock Creek mine. NOVAGOLD also sought buyers, beginning in 2012, for its stake in Galore Creek but it was not until 2018 that it was able to complete a deal with Newmont, leaving Donlin as its sole mining asset. Since then the company pursued project planning and permitting.

== Donlin Gold ==
NOVAGOLD acquired interest in the Donlin Gold property in 2001 when it paid US$12-million to Placer Dome for a 70% share. Barrick Gold acquired the other 30% and in 2007 created a joint venture with NOVAGOLD to develop the mine. Located 20 kilometers from Crooked Creek, Alaska on the Kuskokwim River, the Donlin Gold property is within the Kuskokwim Gold Belt and has estimated reserves of 39 million ounces of gold. As per the Feasibility Study, Donlin Gold has the potential to produce more than 1M ounces of gold annually over a 27-year mine life. Despite a 2012 cost estimate of $6.7 billion, and a lack of commitment by Barrick at that price, permitting has been pursued since then. The substantial costs of bringing power to the remote site, and other development expenses, gave Barrick reason to rethink its investment in the project. In August 2018, the project received permits from the Army Corps of Engineers, after an environmental review.

== Galore Creek ==
In 2003, NOVAGOLD first attained interest in the Galore Creek property. At the time, it had potential reserves of 5 million ounces of gold, 67 million ounces of silver, and 6 billion pounds of copper. Further exploration and feasibility work revised that upwards to 13 million ounces of gold, 156 million ounces of silver and 12 billion pounds of copper, and estimated a cost of US$1 billion to develop a mine. Located with the Stikine Gold Belt, approximately 150 kilometres northeast of Stewart, British Columbia, the project would require over a 100 kilometres of new road, power lines, and natural gas pipeline through mountainous terrain. Though cost projections were revised upwards, the development of the mine appeared to be feasible going into 2007, as NOVAGOLD was acquiring permits to mine, formed the 50/50 joint venture Galore Creek Mining Corporation with Teck Resources, and made the investment decision to proceed with construction of the mine. However, by the end of 2007, after Teck's review the cost estimate was revised to $5 billion, mainly on an unexpectedly complex water diversion and tailings pond requirements and updated material costs, and the project was halted. Despite efforts to re-design or move the tailings pond the project remained uneconomic, and NOVAGOLD sold its stake in 2018 to Newmont Mining for US$275 million.
