= Donlin Gold mine =

Major undeveloped gold deposit in Alaska

Donlin Gold Project
- Location within Alaska
- Location: Crooked Creek, Alaska, United States; 62°02′17″N 158°12′39″W
- Discovered: 1988
- Company: NovaGold Resources (50%), Barrick Gold (50%)
- Website: http://www.donlingold.com/

The Donlin Gold Project is a large, undeveloped, refractory gold deposit located 12 miles (19 km) north of Crooked Creek, Alaska, on the Kuskokwim River, about 280 miles (450 km) northwest of Anchorage. The deposit has proven and probable reserves estimated to be 33.9 million ounces of gold at a grade of 2.1 g/t and could produce an average of one million ounces annually over a 27-year mine life.

== Owners ==
The project is a partnership between NovaGold Resources, Barrick Gold, Calista Corporation, and The Kuskokwim Corporation. Calista is one of 13 regional Alaska Native corporations established as part of the Alaska Native Claims Settlement Act of 1971 (ANCSA) and under ANCSA has title to the subsurface estate in the region. The Kuskokwim Corporation (TKC) was formed in 1977 with the merger of 10 upper river village corporations and TKC has the surface estate in the region.

== Permitting ==
On July 20, 2021, the Alaska Department of Natural Resources granted Donlin Gold the right to lease state land to build a pipeline that will power its mine. On May 27, 2021, the commissioner for the Alaska Department of Environmental Conservation upheld a key state water quality certificate for the Donlin Gold project, citing numerous analyses performed by multiple federal and state agencies throughout the permitting process showed mining operations would meet state and federal environmental and water quality standards. Previously, on April 12, 2021, an administrative law judge recommended that the State of Alaska rescind the project's water quality certificate, required under the Clean Water Act, on the grounds that the State "erred in their hasty issuance" of the certificate, asking the State "to ensure protection of salmon streams." The public was given only 15 days to comment, during COVID-19 lockdown, on 12 different water rights permits for a mine that, if developed, would be one of the largest in the world, placed in the watershed of a major, salmon-bearing river.

== Drilling activities ==
Donlin Gold's drilling program for 2022 is budgeted at USD $60 million, their largest drill program in a decade according to spokeswoman Kristina Woolston.

== Social and economic impact ==
According to a March 8, 2022 study published by the Institute of Social and Economic Research at the University of Alaska Anchorage, much of Alaska's mining potential is dominated by two projects - the proposed Donlin Gold mine and projects in the Ambler mining district. The development of the Donlin Gold project would bring positive economic benefits to the Alaska Native regional and village corporations across the entire state, which under ANCSA Section 7(i) requires regional corporations to distribute 70% of net revenues from resource development on ANCSA land among the rest of the regional corporations, and in turn, Section 7(j) requires that half of the Section 7(i) payments received are distributed to the respective village corporations within each of the ANCSA regions. According to the Yukon-Kuskokwim Region's Comprehensive Economic Development Strategy 2018–2013 report (187 pages) prepared for the United States Department of Commerce, Economic Development Administration and published in July 2018, a potential Donlin gold mine could bring new employment opportunities and new infrastructure investment that could help lower energy and transportation costs. If the project moves forward, initial construction will require 3,000 workers and a $300 million payroll; normal production will require 800-1,200 workers and a $100 million annual payroll; infrastructure would include a port in Bethel, a small river port, a camp, a timber mill, a natural gas pipeline and a fiber optic cable.

== Local controversy ==
There are some published news articles about the environmental concerns of the Donlin mines proposed operations, and there is some local controversy. One main concern, voiced in the public comment section of the Environmental Impact Statement (EIS) issued by Donlin Gold Project, is that it may exceed Alaska's water and air quality regulations. The project's Clean Water Act permit has been challenged by the Orutsararmiut Native Council (ONS) on the grounds that there is no reasonable assurance that the project will comply with state water quality standards or Alaska's Antidegradation Policy. The proposed decision for the case is that Donlin Gold Project and the Alaska Department of Environmental Conservation, Division of Water, in issuing a certificate for Donlin, have not provided the necessary 'reasonable assurance' that water quality standards will be honored in order to proceed with mining operations. Three areas of concern are mercury levels in the water, water temperatures, and degradation of essential salmon habitat.

On May 27, 2021, the Alaska Department of Environmental Conservation, after extensive review, consistently and thoroughly supported the Donlin Gold project's clean water certificate, stating, "In this matter, Orutsararmiut (ONS) cherry-picked portions of the record describing potential impacts in a highly technical report and characterized them as conclusive. The Division consistently and thoroughly rebutted each of Orutsararmiut's assertions with analysis of relevant information and data using its subject-matter expertise," the state's notice stated. The Alaska Department of Environmental Conservation said its clean water certificate is "supported by a reasonable basis in law and substantial evidence in the record." The State said the ONS tribe's concerns had been addressed through conditions attached to the certification.

- Mercury is designated as a toxic substance under the Department of Environmental Conservation 2020 Water Quality Standards. The levels of dissolved mercury in freshwater, as defined by the Alaska Water Quality Standards is 1.4 μg/L for acute pollution (measured as the 1 hour average) or 0.77 μg/L for chronic pollution (measured as the 4 day average). Mercury levels already exceed the water quality standards in some instances in the watershed near the proposed site of the mine. Mining operations may increase mercury levels in the watershed, and this has been used to argue that there is not reasonable assurance that water quality standards will be honored.
- Another argument put forward by the ONS is that, due to a combination of mine operating procedures and a decrease in riparian habitat along the watershed, water temperature in the related watershed is predicted to increase, according to Donlin Gold Project's Final Environmental Impact Statement (FEIS), close to or above Alaska's water quality standards.
- Alaska has an antidegradation policy in compliance with the Federal Clean Water Act. According to federal regulations, all states must have an antidegradation policy, and this policy must, among other things, protect existing uses of any water body. Taking the existing use of salmon habitat into account, the ONS argues that the actions of the mining project do not provide reasonable assurance of compliance with the antidegradation policy, due to dewatering of the watershed, and removal of riparian habitat, which will significantly impact the salmon population.
