= Fort Knox Gold Mine =

Gold mine in Fairbanks mining district, Alaska, US

Fort Knox
- Fort Knox Gold Mine, Alaska
- Location: Fox, Fairbanks mining district, Alaska, Alaska, United States; 64°59′34″N 147°21′40″W
- Products: Gold
- Production: 237,925 gold equivalent ounces
- Financial year: 2020
- Type: Open pit
- Discovered: 1987
- Opened: 1996
- Company: Kinross Gold
- Website: Fort Knox
- Acquired: 1992

The Fort Knox Gold Mine is an open pit gold mine, 9 mi (14 km) east of Fox in the Fairbanks mining district of Alaska. It is owned and operated by Toronto-based Kinross Gold. Originally staked in 1913, after very minor mining at the location the property sat idle until being restaked in 1980. Following the initial exploration discovery in 1987, in 1992 the project was purchased by Amax Gold, which brought the mine to production. Amax Gold merged with Kinross Gold in 1998.

== History ==
The land that the Fort Knox mine sits on was originally staked in 1913 when a bismuth-bearing, gold-quartz vein was located. Minor mining occurred with a small shaft and a three-head stamp mill. There had been placer mining in the area as early as 1903 and in 1980 local prospectors Joe Taylor and George Johnson worked the placer deposits. In 1986, the property was leased to various mining companies. In 1992, Amax Gold purchased the property. Construction began 1995 with the first gold pour at the end of 1996. In 1998, Amax Gold merged with Kinross Gold.

== Geology ==
The Fort Knox gold is hosted by a late-Cretaceous granite pluton that intruded into the surrounding Fairbanks Schist. The pluton is described as "a light gray, fine grained granodiorite, medium grained biotite granite, and coarse grained, biotite granite porphyry, which form blocky bedrock exposures". Gold, bismuth and tellurium minerals occur in pegmatite and quartz veins and fractures within the pluton. The sulfide content is very low (<0.1%).

The Fort Knox gold deposit had pre-production Proven and Probable Reserves in 1996 of 158.3 million tonnes @ 0.83 g/t gold with a 0.39 g/t gold cut-off for 4.2 million ounces. After the production of over 7.5 million ounces, at 31 December 2019 Proven and Probable Reserves were 255.8 million tonnes @ 0.3 g/t gold for 2.80 million ounces.

== Description ==
The Fort Knox Gold Mine, located 15 mi (24 km) northeast of the city of Fairbanks, operates as a single large open pit. From 2001 to 2004, the True North Mine, a small satellite deposit was operated and the ore was processed through the Fort Knox mill. Production from Fort Knox is up to 45,000 tonnes (50,000 short tons) per day of low grade ore (1 gram per tonne), with two mineral processing streams, carbon-in-leach (CIL) for higher grade ore, and heap leaching for lower grade ore). Surpassing 7 million ounces in 2016, Fort Knox is the largest producer of gold in the history of the state of Alaska. The mine's life is expected to extend to 2027 following a $100 million expansion investment announced in 2018, increasing life-of-mine production by about 1.5 million gold equivalent ounces. In 2024 Fort Knox began processing ore from the Manh Choh mine near Tetlin, Alaska and poured the first gold ingot from Manh Choh ore on July 8, 2024.

=== Mining & milling ===
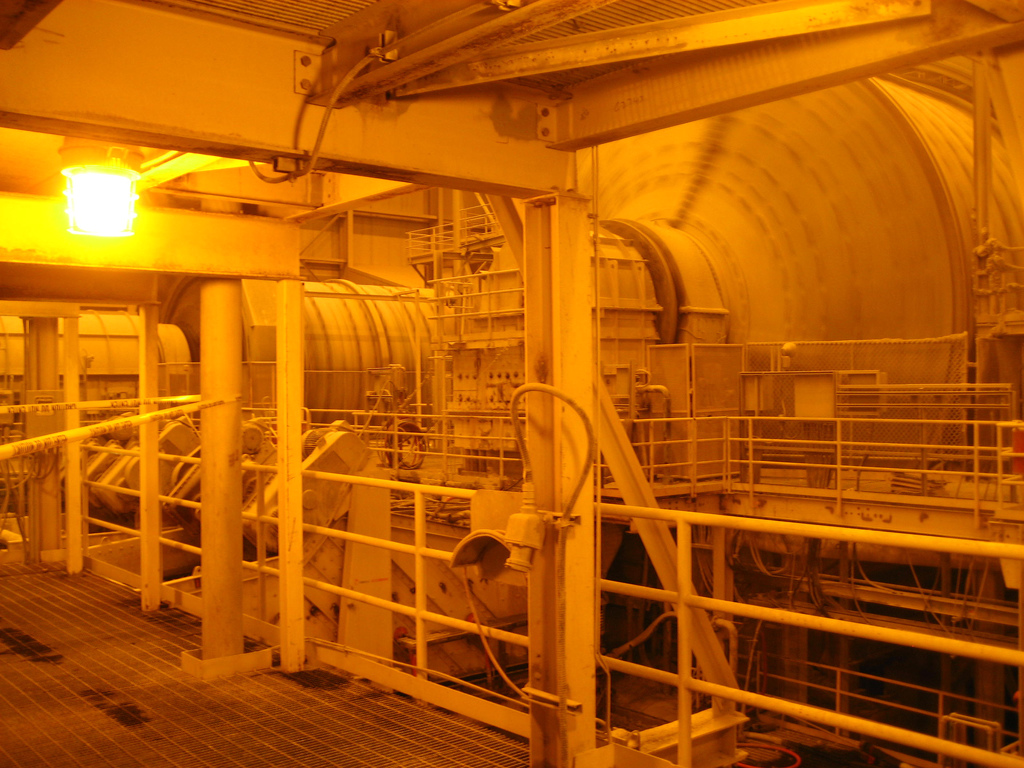
Semi-autogenous grinding mill (foreground) at Fort Knox

In 2003, the mine was scheduled to excavate up to 130,000 tonnes (140,000 short tons) per day with a 2.3:1 stripping ratio, operating seven days per week twelve months per year. Due to its very low sulfide content, waste rock from Fort Knox does not produce acid mine drainage. Ore from the mine is processed at the Fort Knox mill, a conventional crushing, grinding, CIL leaching, carbon stripping and electrolytic recovery process, with a capacity of 36,000 tonnes (40,000 short tons) per day. The mill consists of a gyratory crusher, a 34' x 15' semi-autogenous grinding mill, two 20' x 30' ball mills, and a gravity separation circuit with a Knelson concentrator. Gold not recovered by the Knelson concentrator is sent through the CIL circuit.

In 2009, a valley-fill heap leaching operation came on line. Lower grade ore is trucked to the facility from the mine.

== See also ==
- Red Dog mine
