= Pogo mine =

Gold mine in Alaska, United States

Pogo Gold Mine
- Location within Alaska
- Location: Delta Junction, Alaska, United States; 64°27′0″N 144°54′44″W
- Products: Gold
- Production: 205,878 troy ounces
- Financial year: 2020
- Discovered: 1995
- Opened: 2006
- Company: Northern Star Resources
- Website: www.nsrltd.com
- Acquired: 2018

The Pogo mine is a gold mine in the state of Alaska. By 31 December 2017 Pogo had produced 3.6 million ounces of gold at a grade of 13.6 g/t. Annual production for 2020 was 205,878 ounces. At 31 December 2019 the mine had Proven and Probable Reserves of 1.5 million ounces of gold at a grade of 7.5 g/t (JORC). It is located 30 miles (48 km) northeast of Delta Junction and 90 miles (145 km) east of Fairbanks. Northern Star Resources Ltd announced in May 2020 that it had entered into an agreement with the Japan-based Sumitomo Metal Mining Co and Sumitomo Corp to acquire the Pogo Gold mine.

== Orebody and mining method ==
The orebody consists of numerous highly irregular quartz veins, ranging in thickness from 2 to 40 ft (0.61 to 12.19 m) with 8 to 20 ft (2.4 to 6.1 m) being typical, and ranging in dip from horizontal to vertical with 30-45 degrees being normal. A complex system of faulting offsets the veins both parallel and perpendicular to the strike, resulting in a "chopped-up" orebody. Until 2019 the mine utilized drift-and-fill and overhand cut-and-fill mining methods when, under new owner Northern Star Resources, the mining method was changed to longhole stoping. Access to the orebody is via decline and spiral ramp. After blasting, ore is trucked to the central underground "ore bin", where it is then fed to a conveyor that takes it out of the mine directly to the mill. Typical daily production is about 2,500 tons of ore yielding approximately 1,000 troy ounces of gold.

Pogo uses a paste backfill system, where 20% of the mine's tailings from which gold has been extracted are mixed with cement and then pumped back underground to support subsequent further excavation. This has the additional environmental benefit of reducing the amount of tailings that need to be stored on surface, minimizing the footprint of the mine's dry-stack tailings storage facility.

== Moose incident ==
On October 5, 2004, during construction of the mine, a large moose with 60-inch (1.5 m) antlers got entangled in newly laid power cables and inadvertently lifted into the air as the cables were tensioned. After retrieval, the moose was in distress and was shot.
