= Interstate 80 in Nevada =

Section of Interstate Highway in Nevada, United States

Interstate 80
- Dwight D. Eisenhower Highway; Purple Heart Trail
- I-80 highlighted in red

Route information
- Maintained by NDOT
- Length: 410.458 mi (660.568 km)
- Existed: June 29, 1956–present
- Tourist routes: Lincoln Highway; Victory Highway
- NHS: Entire route

Major junctions
- West end: I-80 at the California state line in Verdi
- I-580 / US 395 in Reno; US 95 Alt. from Fernley to near Lovelock; US 95 near Lovelock to Winnemucca; US 93 in Wells; US 93 Alt. from Wells to West Wendover
- East end: I-80 at the Utah state line in Wendover, UT

Location
- Country: United States
- State: Nevada
- Counties: Washoe, Storey, Lyon, Churchill, Pershing, Humboldt, Lander, Eureka, Elko

Highway system
- Interstate Highway System; Main; Auxiliary; Suffixed; Business; Future; Nevada State Highway System; Interstate; US; State; Pre‑1976; Scenic
← US 50	→ SR 88

Interstate 80 (I-80) traverses the northern portion of the US state of Nevada. The freeway serves the Reno metropolitan area and passes through the towns of Fernley, Lovelock, Winnemucca, Battle Mountain, Carlin, Elko, Wells and West Wendover on its way through the state.

I-80 follows the historical routes of the California Trail, first transcontinental railroad and Feather River Route throughout portions of Nevada. Throughout the entire state, I-80 follows the historical routes of the Victory Highway, State Route 1 (SR 1) and US Route 40 (US 40). The freeway corridor follows the paths of the Truckee and Humboldt rivers. These rivers have been used as a transportation corridor since the California Gold Rush of the 1840s.

The Nevada portion of I-80 has been designated as the Dwight D. Eisenhower Highway and Purple Heart Trail.

== Route description ==
=== Truckee River ===
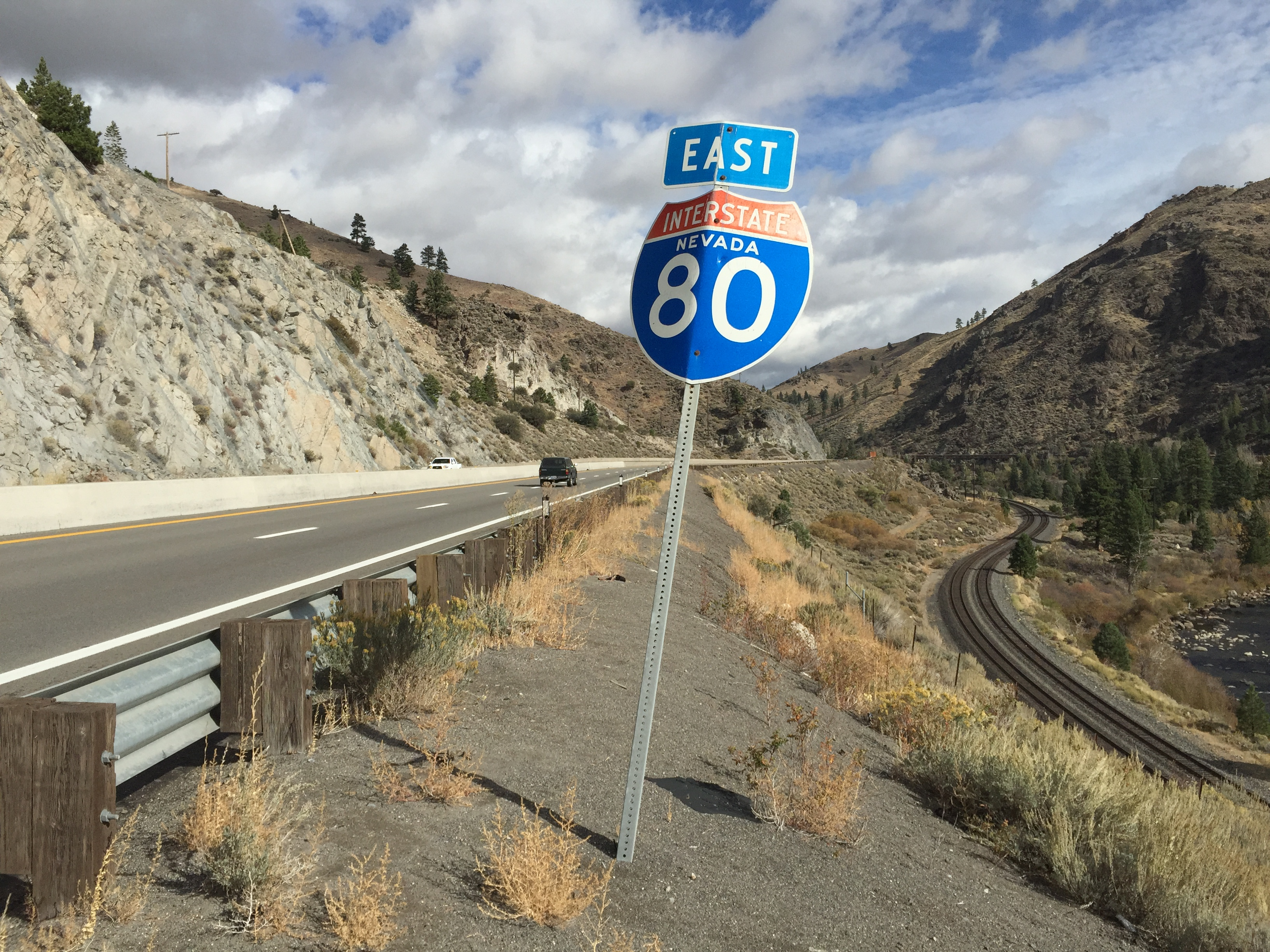
View east along I-80 just after entering Nevada from California. The first transcontinental railroad is visible on the lower right as seen in 2015.

I-80 enters Nevada in the canyon of the Truckee River, paralleling the California Trail and first transcontinental railroad. Upon exiting the canyon, the freeway serves the Truckee Meadows, a name for the urban area consisting of Verdi, Reno, and Sparks. The freeway passes north of downtown Reno in a depressed alignment before intersecting I-580/US 395. The interchange with US 395 is the busiest portion, averaging 122,000 vehicles per day in 2006. The freeway passes through downtown Sparks via a viaduct over the casino floor of the Nugget Casino Resort. After leaving the Reno metropolitan area, the freeway resumes following the Truckee River in a canyon to Fernley and passes the Northern Nevada Veterans Cemetery to the north. Traffic volumes drop to 26,600 vehicles per day by Fernley and continue dropping to 8,400 by the time the freeway reaches the center of the state. The freeway exits the Truckee River corridor near Wadsworth.

=== Lahontan Valley/Forty Mile Desert ===
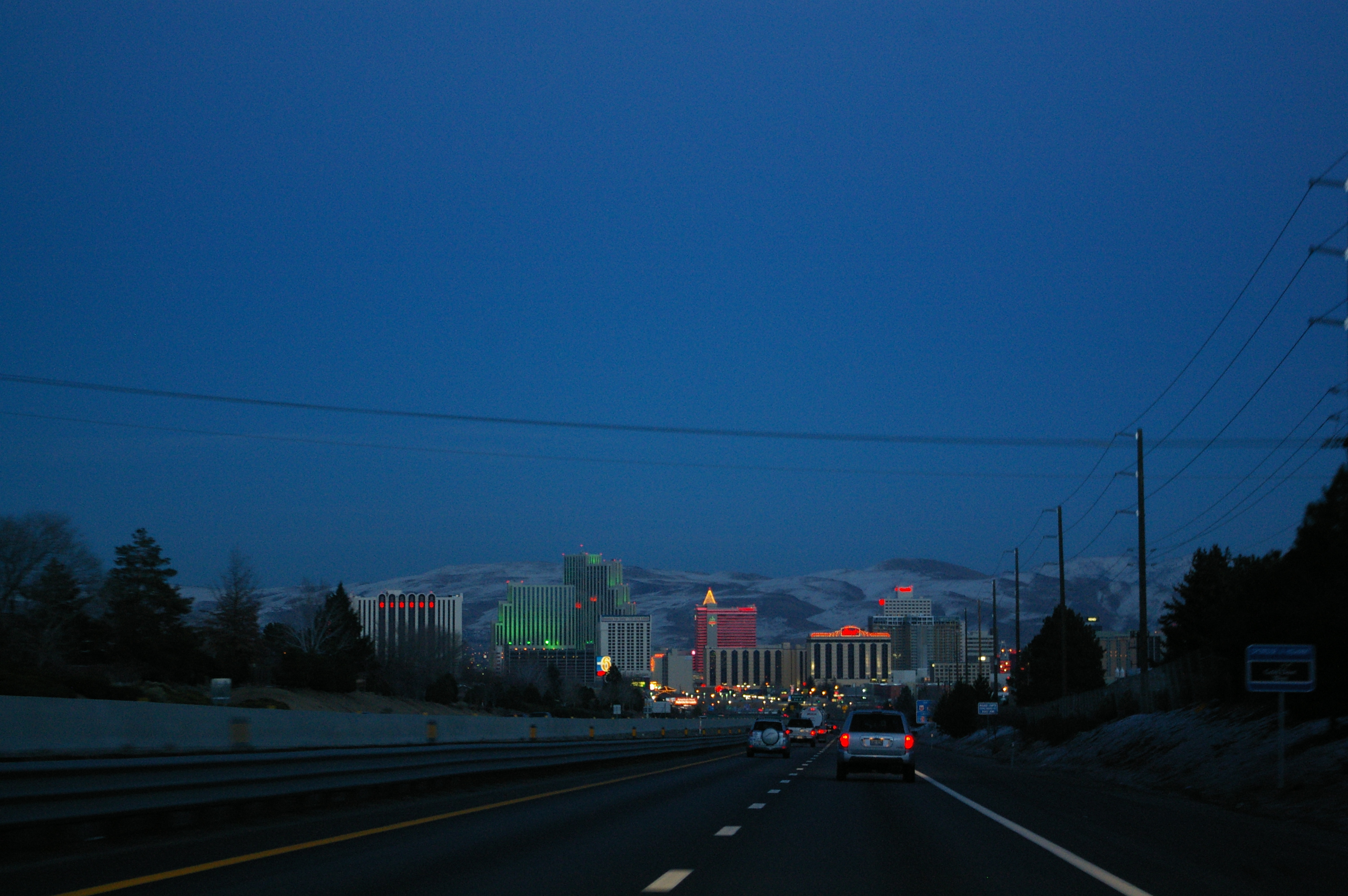
I-80 descending into Reno from the Sierra Nevada as seen in 2007

Past Wadsworth, the freeway cuts across the Lahontan Valley. The Lahontan Valley is a barren desert, sometimes called the Forty Mile Desert, from the era of the California Trail. The name comes from the California Gold Rush where the emigrants came into the Lahontan Valley via the Humboldt River. The travelers would have then to endure 40 miles (64 km) without usable water while crossing the valley, regardless of which of the two routes across the valley the travelers followed. I-80 closely approximates the path of the emigrants between the Humboldt and Truckee rivers.

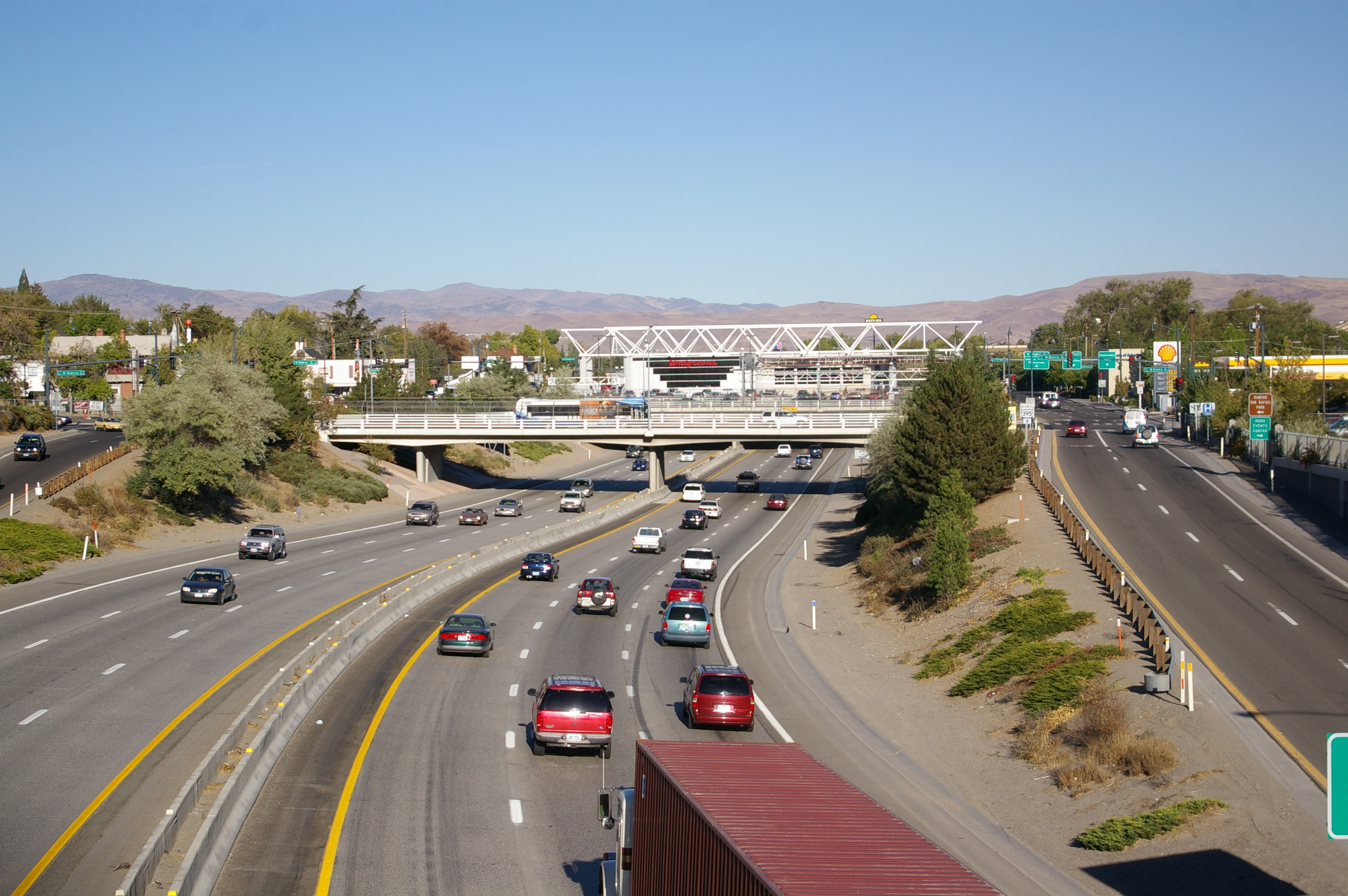
I-80 in Downtown Reno as seen in 2008

A marker stands at a rest area on the eastern edge of the valley, near the junction of I-80 and US 95, that honors travelers who suffered crossing the valley, thousands of whom abandoned possessions, animals, and even loved ones in the desert. Per the marker, this portion was the most dreaded portion of the California Trail. Between eastern Fernley and Winnemucca, the speed limit was raised from 75 to 80 mph (121 to 129 km/h) in 2017.

=== Humboldt River ===
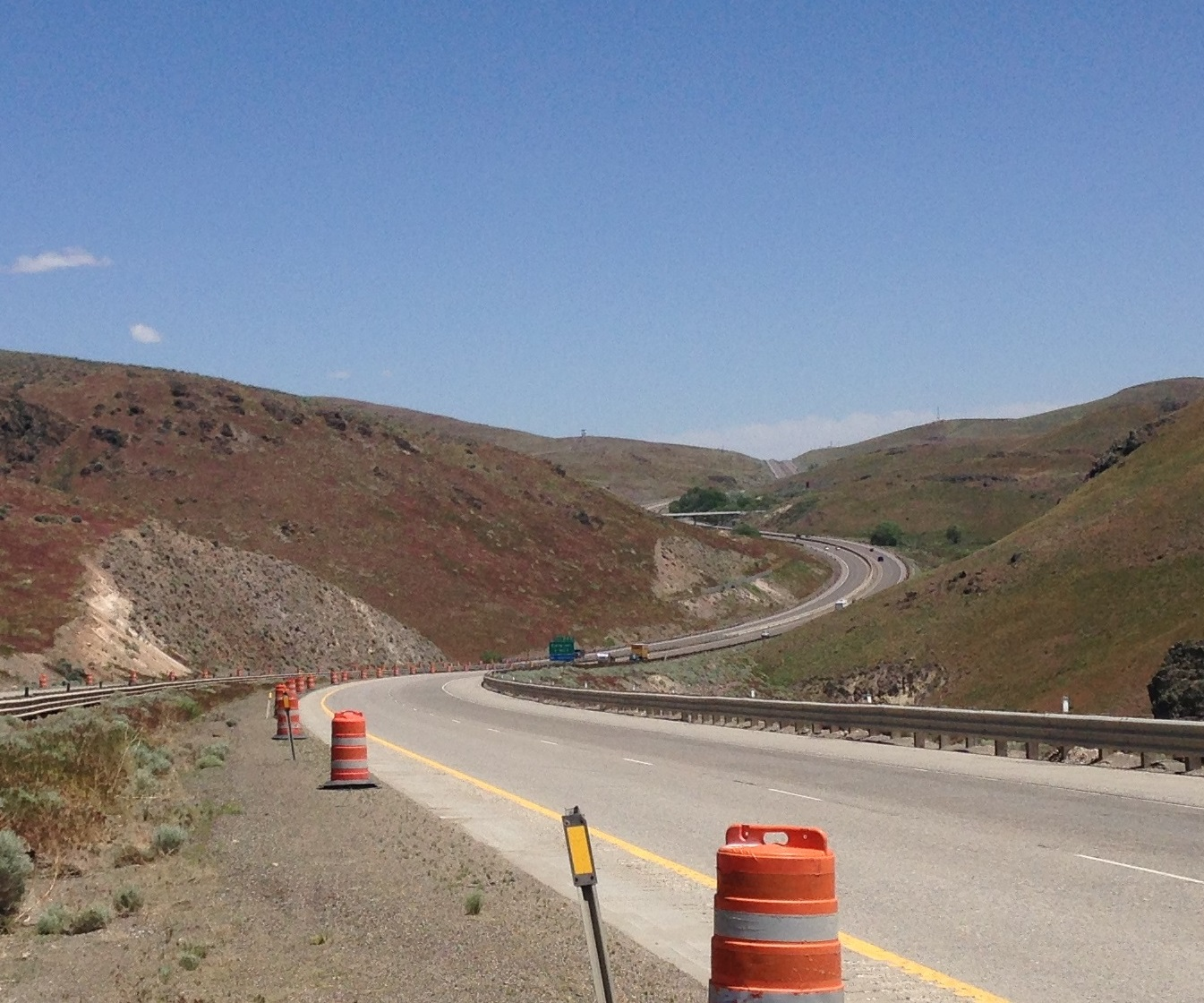
I-80 eastbound on the approach to Emigrant Pass as seen in 2014

For the next 246 miles (396 km), I-80 follows the Humboldt River. (Note: Using distance between Lovelock and Wells.) Along the way, the freeway passes through the towns of Lovelock, Winnemucca, Battle Mountain, Carlin, Elko, and Wells. At Winnemucca, I-80 is joined by the Feather River Route; I-80 runs parallel to this railroad until the Utah state line.

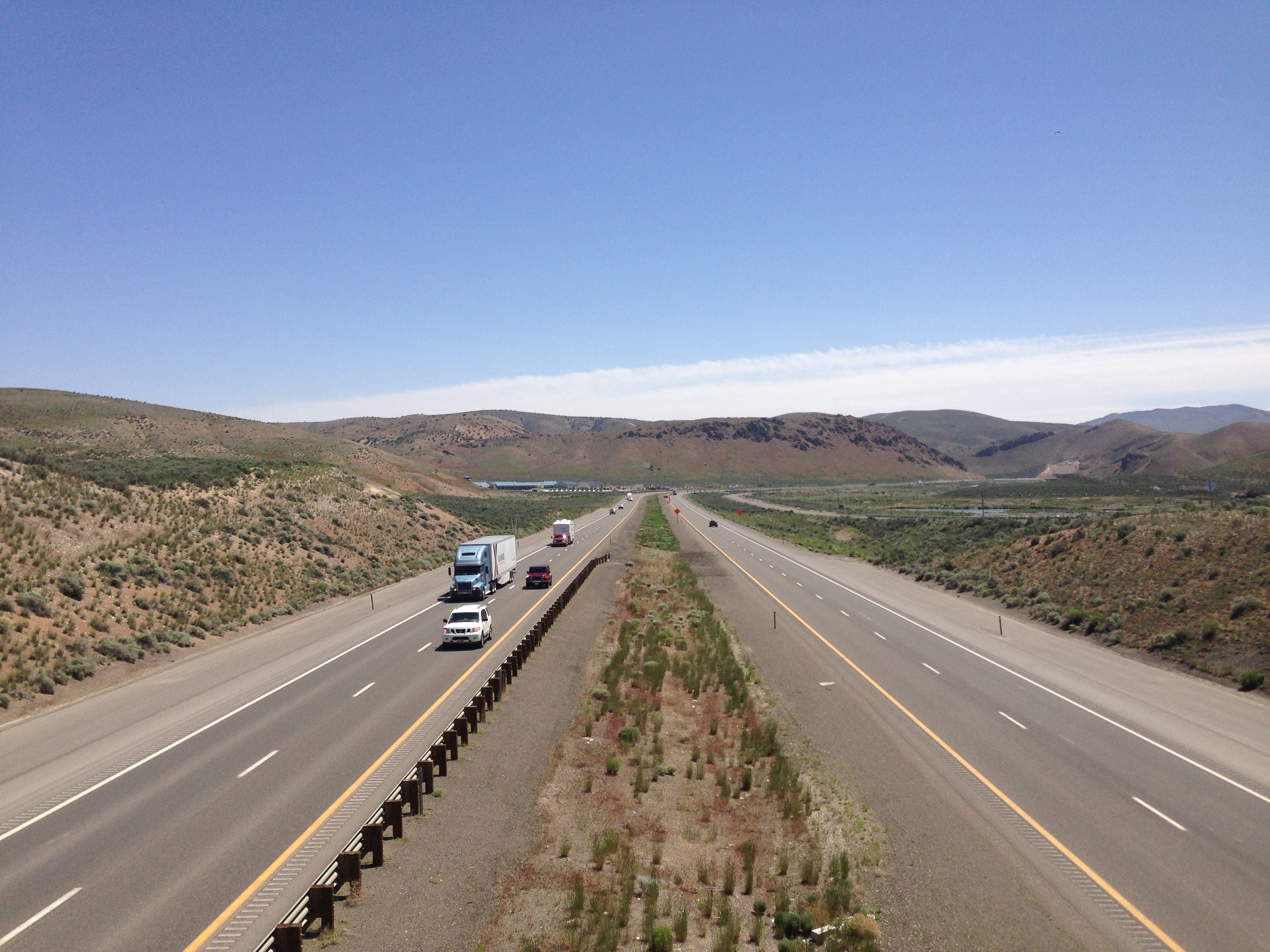
View east along I-80 from an overpass approaching Carlin Canyon as seen in 2014

The freeway is within visual distance of the river for most of this run. However, there are portions where the freeway bypasses bends by cutting across or tunneling under mountains along the canyon walls. Between Winnemucca and Battle Mountain, the freeway bypasses bends via side canyons and Golconda Summit, 5,159 feet (1,572 m). The highway also bypasses Palisade Canyon, between Beowawe and Carlin, via Emigrant Pass, 6,114 feet (1,864 m). Just east of Carlin, I-80 passes through the Carlin Tunnel to bypass curves of the river in the Carlin Canyon (between the Carlin Tunnel and Elko).

=== Eastern Nevada ===
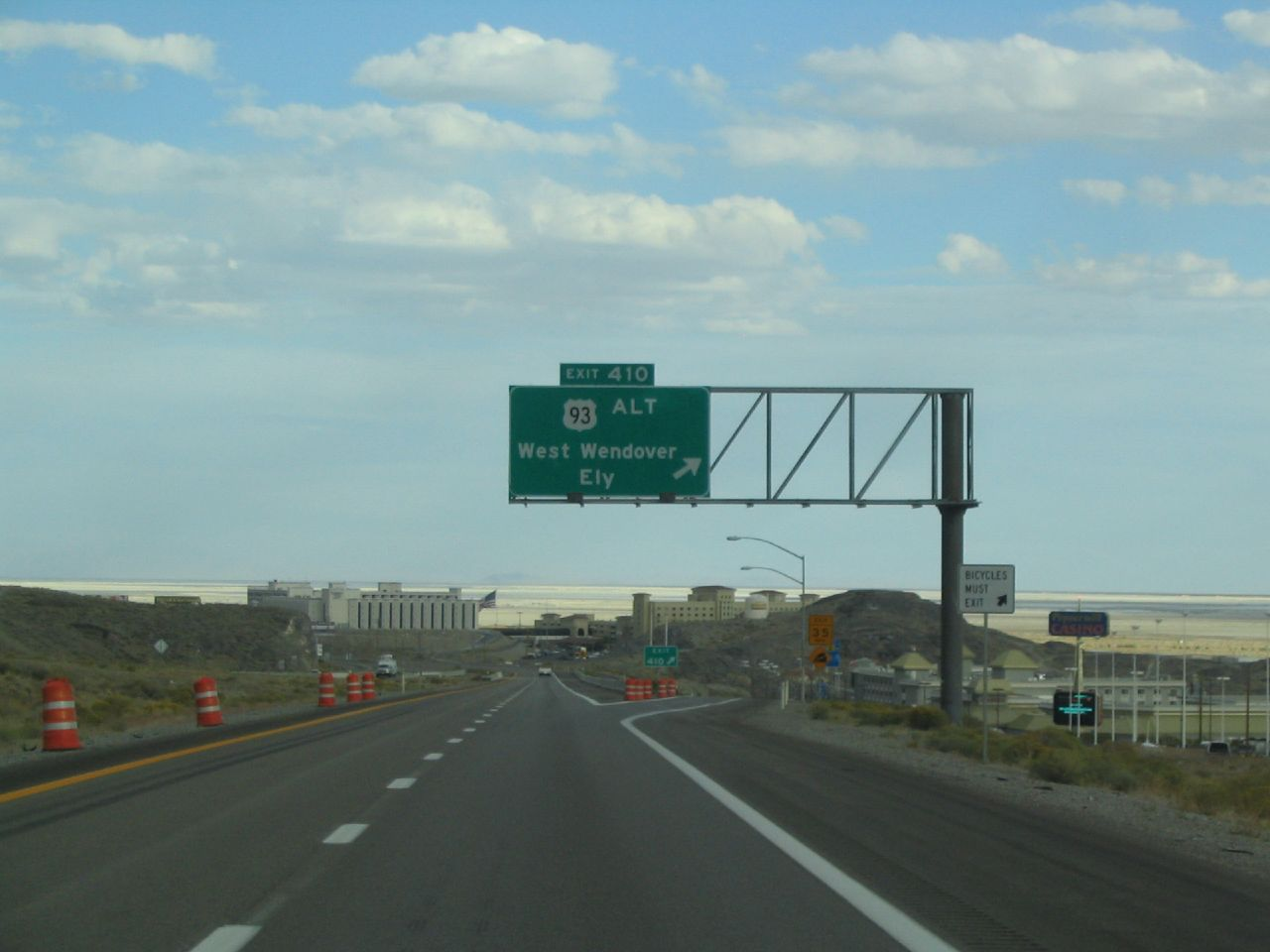
Approaching West Wendover from west as seen in 2007

After Wells, I-80 departs the Humboldt River, first transcontinental railroad, and California Trail. From this point east, the freeway follows the routes of the Hastings Cutoff, Feather River Route, former US 40, and SR 1. The freeway cuts across two mountain ranges before arriving at the Great Salt Lake Desert. The first is the Pequop Mountains via Pequop Summit, elevation 6,967 feet (2,124 m)—the highest point on I-80 in Nevada—and the second is the Toano Range via Silver Zone Pass at 5,955 feet (1,815 m). After crossing these mountains, the freeway arrives at West Wendover where the freeway enters both Utah and the Great Salt Lake Desert at the Bonneville Salt Flats.

=== Overlaps ===
Portions of I-80 run concurrently with three US Routes in Nevada:

- US 95 Alternate (US 95 Alt), which runs concurrently with I-80 between Fernley and Trinity Junction near Lovelock.
- US 95, which runs concurrently with I-80 between Trinity Junction and Winnemucca.
- US 93 Alt, which runs concurrently with I-80 between the cities of Wells and West Wendover.

== History ==
=== California Trail ===
The general route of I-80 was first used by California-bound travelers and was called the California Trail. From the Utah state line west to the Humboldt River, I-80 follows a modified routing of a lesser used branch of the trail called Hastings Cutoff. The cutoff rejoins the main route of the trail in the Humboldt River canyon. Through this portion of Nevada, the main route of the California Trail ran north of modern SR 233.

From Elko west to Lovelock, I-80 faithfully follows the California Trail. West of Lovelock, in the middle of the Humboldt Sink, the California Trail again splits into two branches. These branches, the Carson River route and the Truckee River route, are named for the waterways that guide each branch up the Sierra Nevada. I-80 follows the Truckee route, the Carson route is approximated by US 95, US 50, US 395, and SR 88/California State Route 88.

=== Transcontinental railroads ===
The route of modern I-80 was also previously used for the construction of two transcontinental railroads. The first transcontinental railroad, completed in 1869, closely follows the main line of the California Trail and I-80 west of Wells. The Feather River Route was constructed in 1909 and generally follows the Hastings Cutoff through Eastern Nevada. It also runs parallel to I-80 in Nevada east of Winnemucca.

=== Highways ===
State Route 1
- Location: California state line–Utah state line
- Existed: c. 1929–1939

U.S. Route 40
- Location: California state line–Utah state line
- Existed: 1939–1975

The first paved road across this portion of Nevada was the Victory Highway, designated in Nevada as SR 1. With the formation of the US Numbered Highway System, this route was numbered US 40. From the formation of the Interstate Highway System, the highway was gradually upgraded to Interstate Highway standards and signed as I-80. In 1974, officials in Utah initiated meetings with officials in Nevada and California to truncate the route of US 91. By that time, US 91 was mostly redundant with I-15. Nevada officials agreed and further suggested that both US 91 and US 40 be truncated. Nevada officials recommended the changes occur in 1975, when the last Nevada piece of I-15 was expected to be completed. The 1976 edition of the official highway map for Nevada was the first not showing the US 40 designation. Even though the US Route designation was removed, the freeway was not yet completed. The last piece of I-80 in Nevada to be finished was the Lovelock bypass which started construction in 1981. The 1982 Official Nevada Highway Map was the first to note I-80 as a contiguous freeway across the state. All of the business loops for I-80 in Nevada use the historical route of US 40.

I-80 is also known in Nevada as the Dwight D. Eisenhower Highway after the former president of the same name and the Purple Heart Trail after such military decoration.

== Future ==
There are plans to widen I-80 to three lanes in both directions from Vista Boulevard and Greg Street to SR 439 south (USA Parkway). This is due to the increase in traffic travelling between Reno and Sparks to the Tahoe Reno Industrial Center built up on USA Parkway, thousands of people traverse I-80 through the Truckee River Canyon every day and that section is still 2 lanes in each direction and accidents on this stretch of Interstate have risen tremendously since the Tahoe Reno Industrial Center has opened.

== Exit list ==
County	Location	mi	km	Exit	Destinations	Notes
Washoe	Verdi	0.000	0.000		I-80 west – Sacramento	Continuation into California
Washoe	Verdi			1	Gold Ranch Road (I-80 Bus. east) – Verdi	Westbound exit and entrance; former US 40 east
Washoe	Verdi	2.8	4.5	2	Gold Ranch Road (I-80 Bus. east to SR 425) – Verdi	No westbound entrance; former US 40 east
Washoe	Verdi	3.2	5.1	3	South Verdi Road	Westbound exit and eastbound entrance
Washoe	Verdi	4.8	7.7	4	Boomtown Garson Road	
Washoe	Verdi	5.7	9.2	5	SR 425 west (Old U.S. 40 (I-80 Bus. west)) – East Verdi	Westbound exit and eastbound entrance; former US 40 west
Washoe	Mogul	7.0	11.3	7	Mogul Road	
Washoe	Reno	7.7	12.4	8	West 4th Street (SR 647 east)	Eastbound exit and westbound entrance; former US 40 east
Washoe	Reno	9.2	14.8	9	Robb Drive	
Washoe	Reno	10.7	17.2	10	McCarran Boulevard West (SR 659)	Former SR 651
Washoe	Reno	12.5	20.1	12	Keystone Avenue (I-80 Bus. east)	Former SR 657
Washoe	Reno	13.3	21.4	13	Virginia Street (US 395 Bus.) – Downtown	Virginia Street was formerly part of SR 430/US 395; Sierra Street was formerly part of SR 660; serves Saint Mary's Regional Medical Center and University of Nevada, Reno
Washoe	Reno	14.1	22.7	14	Wells Avenue	Serves Renown Regional Medical Center, VA Sierra Nevada Health Care System and Reno-Sparks Livestock Events Center
Washoe	Reno	14.9	24.0	15	I-580 south / US 395 – Carson City, Susanville	Serves Reno–Tahoe International Airport and Reno-Sparks Convention Center; I-580 exit 36 and US 395 exit 68
Washoe	Sparks	15.4	24.8	16	Prater Way / East 4th Street (I-80 Bus. / SR 647 west)	Former US 40
Washoe	Sparks	16.1	25.9	17	Rock Boulevard (SR 668)	Serves Victorian Square; also signed for Nugget Avenue eastbound
Washoe	Sparks	16.8	27.0	18	SR 445 (Pyramid Way)	Serves Victorian Square
Washoe	Sparks	17.6	28.3	19	McCarran Boulevard East (SR 659 to I-80 Bus. west)	McCarran Boulevard was formerly part of SR 650; Victorian Avenue was formerly part of US 40 west
Washoe	Sparks	18.9	30.4	20	Sparks Boulevard	
Washoe	Sparks	19.7	31.7	21	Vista Boulevard / Greg Street	Serves Northern Nevada Medical Center
Washoe	Lockwood	22.6	36.4	22	Lockwood (Canyon Way)	
Washoe		24.0	38.6	23	Mustang (Mustang Ranch Road)	
Washoe		28.2	45.4	28	Patrick (SR 655 south / Waltham Way)	
Washoe	Clark	32.1	51.7	32	SR 439 south (USA Parkway)	Serves Tahoe Reno Industrial Center; replaced former Tracy, Clark Station exit on January 21, 2008
Washoe		36.9	59.4	36	Derby Dam	
Washoe		39.0	62.8	38	Orchard	
Washoe		40.2	64.7	40	Painted Rock (Painted Rock Road)	
Washoe	Wadsworth	44.0	70.8	43	Wadsworth (I-80 Bus. east / SR 427 east / Main Street / Cantlon Drive)	Main Street was formerly part of US 40 east; serves Pyramid Lake
Storey	No major junctions					
Lyon	Fernley	46.4	74.7	46	West Fernley (I-80 Bus. / SR 427 / Main Street)	Also signed "To US 95 Alt. south" eastbound; former US 40; serves Tiger Field, Wadsworth and Pyramid Lake
Lyon	Fernley	48.9	78.7	48	US 95 Alt. south (I-80 Bus. west) to US 50 Alt. – East Fernley	Western end of US 95 Alt. concurrency; former US 40 west/US 95 south
Lyon	Fernley	50.1	80.6	50	Nevada Pacific Parkway	Opened on June 19, 2009
Churchill		65.2	104.9	65	Nightingale Hot Springs	
Churchill		78.9	127.0	78	Jessup	
Churchill	Trinity	83.3	134.1	83	US 95 south (Veterans Memorial Highway) – Fallon, Las Vegas US 95 Alt. ends	Eastern end of US 95 Alt. concurrency; western end of US 95 concurrency
Pershing	Toulon	93.5	150.5	93	Toulon (Ragged Top Road / Frontage Road)	Serves Derby Field
Pershing	Lovelock	105.5	169.8	105	West Lovelock (I-80 Bus. east / SR 396 north / Cornell Avenue / Frontage Road)	Eastbound exit and westbound entrance; former US 40 east/US 95 north; serves Pershing General Hospital
Pershing	Lovelock	106.4	171.2	106	Downtown Lovelock (SR 398 north / Main Street)	Serves Pershing General Hospital
Pershing	Lovelock	107.2	172.5	107	East Lovelock (I-80 Bus. west / SR 856 / Cornell Avenue / Airport Road)	Westbound exit and eastbound entrance
Pershing	Lovelock	112.9	181.7	112	Coal Canyon (SR 396 south / Coal Canyon Road)	Former US 40 west/US 95 south
Pershing	Oreana	120.2	193.4	119	Oreana, Rochester (Unionville Road)	Former SR 400 north/SR 858 east
Pershing		129.6	208.6	129	Rye Patch Dam (SR 401 west)	
Pershing	Humboldt	138.7	223.2	138	Humboldt	
Pershing	Imlay	146.0	235.0	145	Imlay	
Pershing	Mill City	150.3	241.9	149	SR 400 south (Unionville Road) / Tungsten Road / Frontage Road – Mill City, Unionville	
Pershing	Mill City	152.1	244.8	151	Mill City, Dun Glen (Frontage Road / Dun Glen Road)	No westbound entrance
Pershing	Cosgrave	158.7	255.4	158	Cosgrave	
Humboldt	Rose Creek	168.4	271.0	168	Rose Creek (Rose Creek Road)	
Humboldt	Winnemucca	173.4	279.1	173	West Winnemucca Boulevard	Former US 40 east; serves Winnemucca Municipal Airport
Humboldt	Winnemucca	176.7	284.4	176	US 95 north (Veterans Memorial Highway / I-80 Bus. east) – Winnemucca Downtown West	Eastern end of US 95 concurrency; former US 40
Humboldt	Winnemucca	179.0	288.1	178	SR 289 – Winnemucca Downtown East	Serves Golden Valley Medical Center and Humboldt General Hospital
Humboldt	Winnemucca	180.8	291.0	180	SR 794 west (East Winnemucca Boulevard / I-80 Bus. west) / Pedroli Avenue	East Winnemucca Boulevard was formerly part of US 40 west
Humboldt	Button Point	187.7	302.1	187	Button Point	
Humboldt	Golconda	194.5	313.0	194	Golconda, Midas (SR 789 north / Morrison Avenue / Getchell Mine Road)	
Humboldt		200.5	322.7	200	Golconda Summit	
Humboldt		204.1	328.5	203	Iron Point (Summit Road)	
Humboldt		205.6	330.9	205	Pumpernickel Valley (Pumpernickel Loop Road)	
Humboldt	Stone House	212.5	342.0	212	Stone House (Stone House Road)	
Humboldt	Valmy	217.2	349.5	216	Valmy (Marigold Mine Road)	
Humboldt		222.7	358.4	222	Mote (Mote Road)	
Lander	Battle Mountain	230.2	370.5	229	SR 304 east (I-80 Bus. east / Front Street) / Allen Road – West Battle Mountain	Front Street was formerly part of US 40 east
Lander	Battle Mountain	231.7	372.9	231	SR 305 (Broad Street) – Downtown Battle Mountain	Serves Battle Mountain General Hospital
Lander	Battle Mountain	233.6	375.9	233	SR 304 west (I-80 Bus. west / Front Street) / Hill Top Road – East Battle Mountain	Front Street was formerly part of US 40 west; serves Battle Mountain Airport
Lander	Argenta	244.7	393.8	244	Argenta	
Eureka	Dunphy	254.5	409.6	254	Dunphy	
Eureka		261.4	420.7	261	SR 306 south – Beowawe, Crescent Valley	
Eureka		269.2	433.2	268	Emigrant (Primeaux Canyon Road)	
Eureka		271.6	437.1	271	Palisade (Frenchie Road)	
Elko	Carlin	280.0	450.6	279	SR 278 south (I-80 Bus. east / Bush Street / to SR 221 / Chestnut Street) / James Creek Road – West Carlin, Eureka	Chestnut Street was formerly part of US 40 east
Elko	Carlin	281.4	452.9	280	SR 766 (10th Street / Newmont Road) – Central Carlin	
Elko	Carlin	282.7	455.0	282	SR 221 west (I-80 Bus. west / Suzie Creek Way to Chestnut Street) – East Carlin	
Elko	Hunter	293.3	472.0	292	Hunter (Maggie Creek Ranch Road)	
Elko	Elko	299.2	481.5	298	SR 535 east (I-80 Bus. east / Idaho Street) – Elko West	Former US 40 east
Elko	Elko	301.9	485.9	301	SR 225 (Mountain City Highway) – Elko Downtown	Serves Elko Regional Airport and Northeastern Nevada Regional Hospital
Elko	Elko	304.4	489.9	303	Elko East (I-80 Bus. west / Jennings Way to Idaho Street)	
Elko	Osino	311.5	501.3	310	Osino (Idaho Street / Piute Road / Victory Boulevard)	Idaho Street was formerly part of US 40 west
Elko	Ryndon	315.5	507.7	314	Ryndon, Devils Gate (Scotts Road / Coal Mine Canyon Road)	CR 742
Elko	Ryndon	317.7	511.3	317	Elburz, Devils Gate (2nd Street / Old Devils Gate Road)	CR 745
Elko	Halleck	322.2	518.5	321	SR 229 east (Halleck and Secret Pass Road) – Halleck, Ruby Valley	
Elko		329.0	529.5	328	River Ranch	
Elko	Deeth	334.5	538.3	333	SR 230 – Deeth, Starr Valley	Former US 40 east
Elko	Welcome	344.4	554.3	343	Welcome, Starr Valley (SR 230 west)	Former US 40 west
Elko	Beverly Hills	348.2	560.4	348	Beverly Hills	
Elko	Wells	351.6	565.8	351	West Wells (I-80 Bus. east / SR 223 east / SR 231 south)	Former US 40 east
Elko	Wells	352.5	567.3	352A	US 93 – East Wells US 93 Alt. begins	Western end of US 93 Alt. concurrency; signed as exit 352 eastbound; serves Wells Municipal Airport
Elko	Wells			352B	East Wells (I-80 Bus. west / 6th Street)	Westbound exit only; former US 40 west
Elko	Moor	360.7	580.5	360	Moor	
Elko	Independence Valley	365.9	588.9	365	Independence Valley	
Elko	Pequop Summit	373.8	601.6	373	Summit	
Elko	Pequop	376.5	605.9	376	Pequop (Pequop Road)	
Elko	Oasis	379.4	610.6	378	SR 233 east (Montello Road) – Oasis, Montello	
Elko		388.1	624.6	387	Shafter (Shafter Road)	CR 789
Elko		399.2	642.5	398	Pilot Peak (Pilot Road)	CR 767
Elko	West Wendover	407.2	655.3	407	Ola	
Elko	West Wendover	410.4	660.5	410	US 93 Alt. south (I-80 Bus. east / Florence Way to Wendover Boulevard) – West Wendover, Ely	Eastern end of US 93 Alt. concurrency; serves Wendover Airport
Elko	West Wendover	410.458	660.568		I-80 east – Salt Lake City	Continuation into Utah
1.000 mi = 1.609 km; 1.000 km = 0.621 mi: Concurrency terminus; Incomplete access

== Notes ==
Interstate 80
Previous state: California	Nevada	Next state: Utah
