= Pequop, Nevada =

- Ghost town
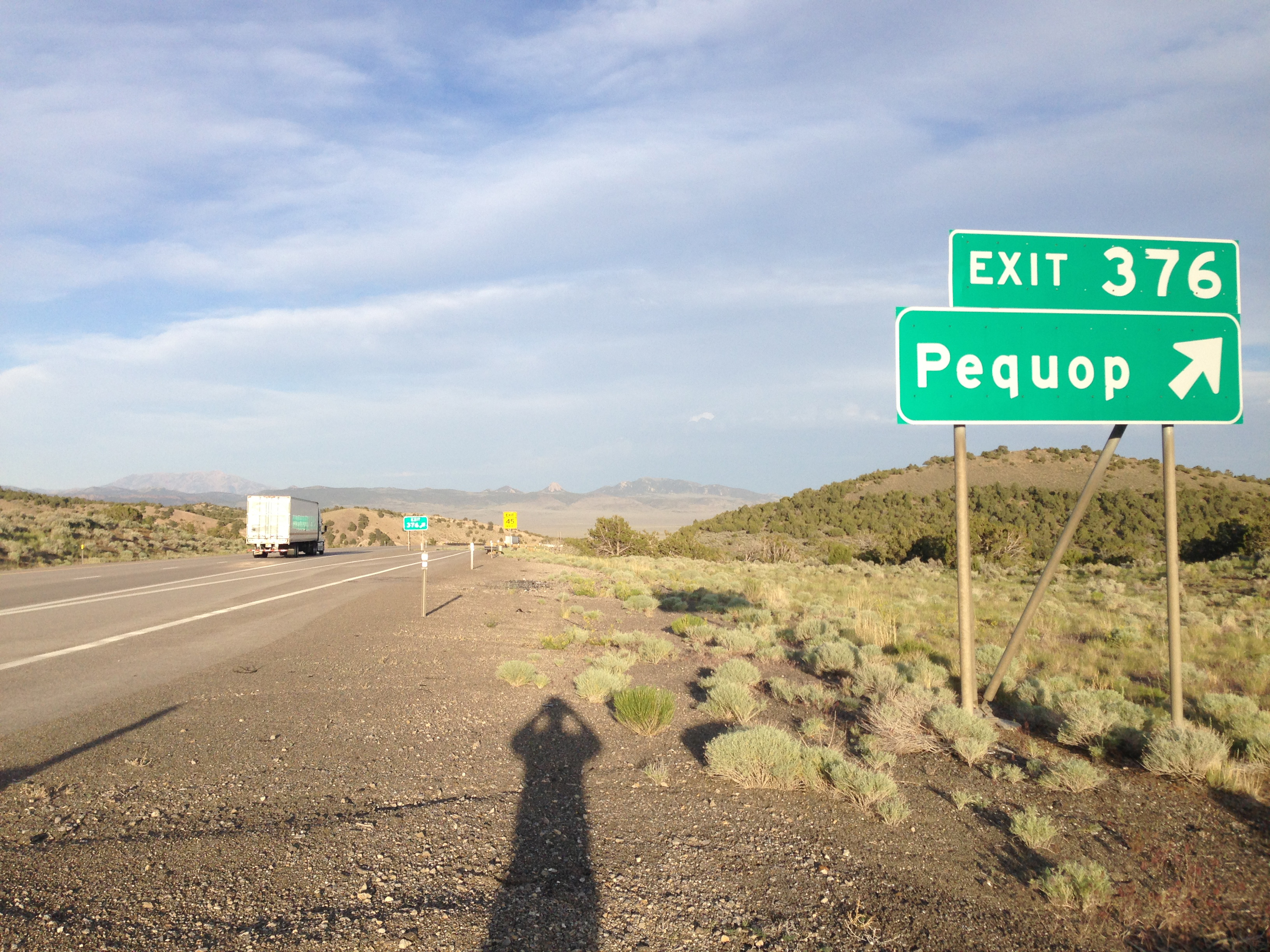
- Exit for Pequop along I-80

- Location within Nevada
- Country: United States
- State: Nevada
- County: Elko

Area
  - Total: 2.48 sq mi (6.42 km^{2})
  - Land: 2.48 sq mi (6.42 km^{2})
  - Water: 0 sq mi (0.0 km^{2})
- Elevation: 6,142 ft (1,872 m)

Population (2010)
  - Total: 709
  - Density: 286/sq mi (110.3/km^{2})
- Time zone: UTC-8 (Pacific (PST))
  - Summer (DST): UTC-7 (PDT)
- Area code: 775
- FIPS code: 32-53200
- GNIS feature ID: 856101

Pequop or Pequop Siding is a ghost town in Elko County, Nevada, United States. It was located west of Toano on the route around the north end of the Pequop Mountains between Cobre and Wells. It was first a stop station of the Central Pacific Railroad and later a non-agency station on the Southern Pacific Railroad. Several buildings were erected to house section crews.

== History ==
In November, 1870, Pequop siding was the site of the second robbery of the same train. The train was first robbed near Verdi, Nevada of about US$40,000 (equivalent to $1,018,000 in 2025) payroll intended for Virginia City. The train was robbed again near Moor (just east of Wells), or at Pequop Siding of about US$3,000 (equivalent to $76,000 in 2025). The robbers turned out to be deserters from Camp Halleck. One of the robbers was Edward Carr, who three weeks before the robbery had murdered Sally Whitmore, the madam of a brothel near Camp Halleck. One of Carr's gloves was found at the site of the robbery.

The end of the village was in the 1940s, when the introduction of diesel in locomotives made Pequop obsolete.
