= Rye Patch State Recreation Area =

Recreation area in Nevada, United States

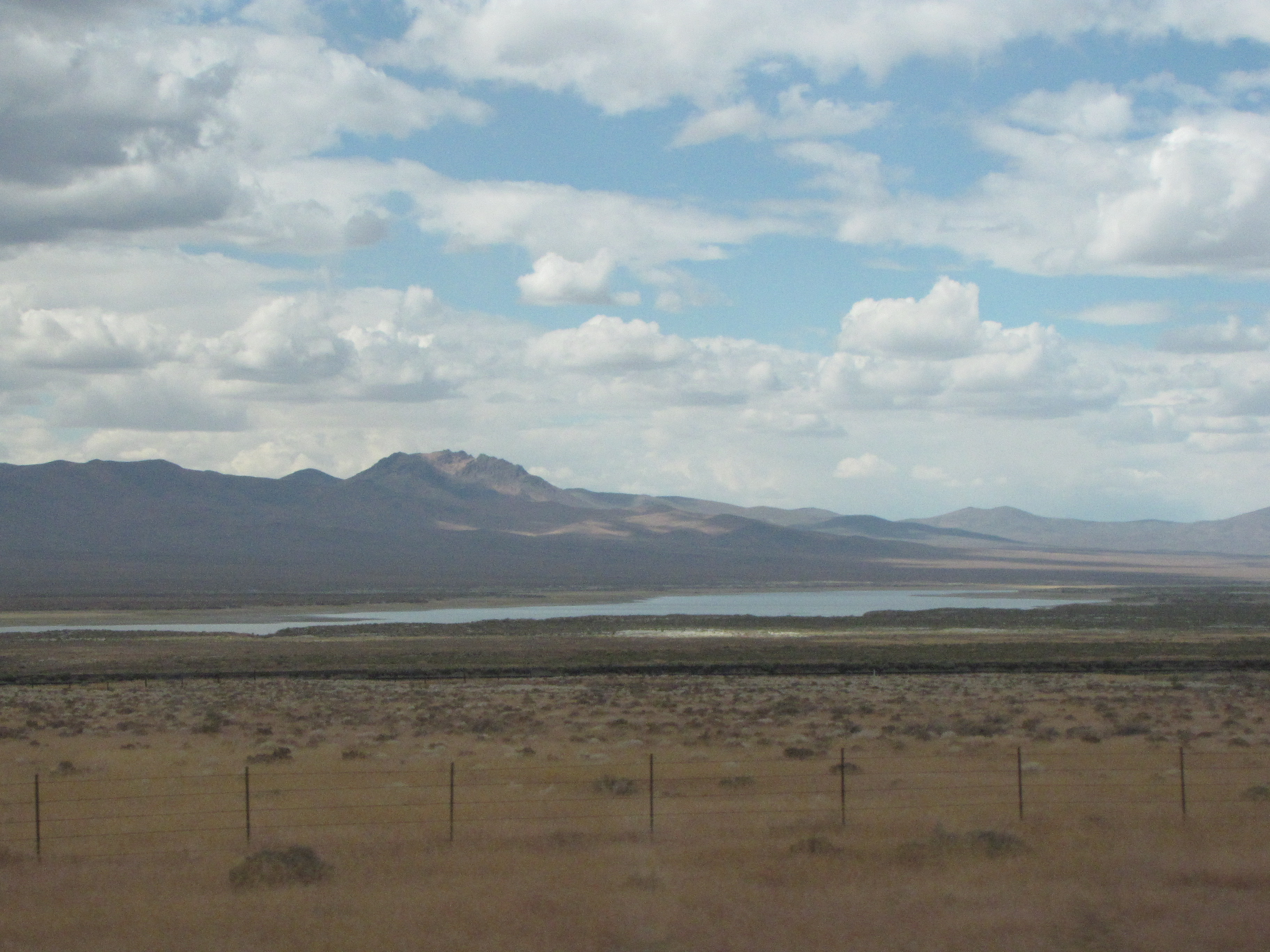
- Reservoir from I-80 south of Imlay

- Location within Nevada
- Location: Pershing County, Nevada, United States
- Nearest city: Lovelock, Nevada
- Coordinates: 40°41′53″N 118°17′14″W
- Area: 2,448.99 acres (991.07 ha)
- Elevation: 4,137 ft (1,261 m)
- Established: 1971
- Administrator: Nevada Division of State Parks
- Visitors: 25,556 vehicles (in 2017)
- Designation: Nevada state park
- Website: Official website

Rye Patch State Recreation Area is a 2,400-acre (970 ha) state park unit of Nevada, United States, adjoining Rye Patch Reservoir, an 11,000-acre (4,500 ha) impoundment on the Humboldt River, and the smaller Pitt-Taylor Reservoirs. The recreation area is located at the end of State Route 401 (Rye Patch Road), which connects to Interstate 80/U.S. Route 95 about 22 miles (35 km) northeast of Lovelock.

== History ==
The park is located in a part of Nevada that in prehistoric times was under Lake Lahontan. When the lake had receded lower than the present-day reservoir, by about 23,000 years ago, animals such as camels, horses, rabbits, and squirrels would drink from the river, and some of their fossils have been found about 14 miles (23 km) north of the dam. Archaeological evidence from Lovelock Cave and elsewhere shows that humans would camp along the Humboldt about 8,000 years ago.

In the mid-19th century, particularly during the California Gold Rush, travelers along the Humboldt would graze their cattle on the wild ryegrass in the area near present-day Rye Patch Reservoir, which was known as Lassen Meadows. At Lassen Meadows the Applegate-Lassen Cut-Off of the California Trail, which provided a quicker route to Goose Lake in northeast California and the California gold fields, left the main route of that trail and headed toward the Black Rock Desert.

The Rye Patch Dam was constructed between 1933 and 1936 by the Public Works Administration as a New Deal relief project during the Great Depression. In 1971 the reservoir was made a Nevada State Recreation Area.

== Activities and amenities ==
Among the facilities the park offers are a campground, picnic areas, and a launch for boating. Visitors can fish for crappie, wipers, white bass, channel catfish, black bass, and walleye.
