= Verdi-Mogul, Nevada =

- Former CDP
- Location of Verdi-Mogul, Nevada
- Coordinates: 39°30′52″N 119°57′26″W
- Country: United States
- State: Nevada

Area
  - Total: 24.2 sq mi (62.6 km^{2})
  - Land: 24.1 sq mi (62.4 km^{2})
  - Water: 0.077 sq mi (0.2 km^{2})

Population (2000)
  - Total: 2,949
  - Density: 122/sq mi (47.3/km^{2})
- Time zone: UTC-8 (Pacific (PST))
  - Summer (DST): UTC-7 (PDT)
- FIPS code: 32-79425

Verdi-Mogul is a former census-designated place (CDP) in Washoe County, Nevada, United States. For the 2010 census it was split into two separate CDPs, Verdi and Mogul. The communities lie on the western side of the Reno–Sparks Metropolitan Statistical Area, just off Interstate 80. The population of the combined CDP was 2,949 at the 2000 census.

== Geography ==
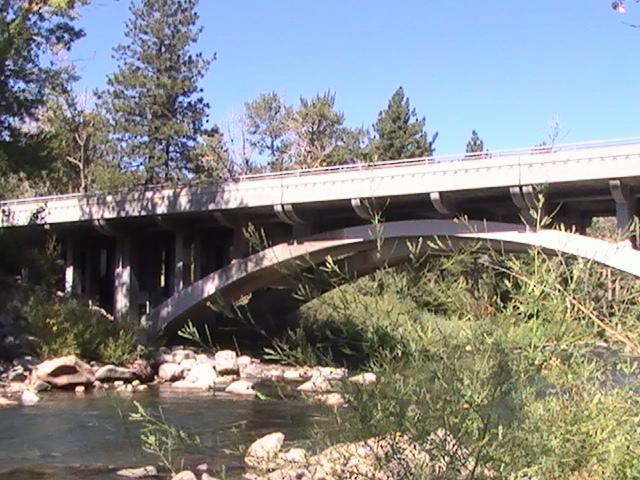
Third Street (Old U.S. Route 40) passes over the Truckee River, as seen from Crystal Peak Park in Verdi

The Verdi-Mogul CDP was located at 39°30′52″N 119°57′26″W (39.514409, -119.957145). The area is on the western border of Nevada, adjacent to the California state line at the 120th meridian west.

According to the United States Census Bureau, the CDP had a total area of 24.2 square miles (62.6 km^{2}), of which 24.1 square miles (62.4 km^{2}) was land and 0.1 square mile (0.2 km^{2}) (0.37%) was water.

== Demographics ==
As of the census of 2000, there were 2,949 people, 1,159 households, and 841 families residing in the CDP. The population density was 122.5 inhabitants per square mile (47.3/km^{2}). There were 1,213 housing units at an average density of 50.4 per square mile (19.5/km^{2}). The racial makeup of the CDP was 96.13% White, 0.51% African American, 0.20% Native American, 1.05% Asian, 0.78% from other races, and 1.32% from two or more races. Hispanic or Latino of any race were 3.29% of the population.

There were 1,159 households, out of which 34.1% had children under the age of 18 living with them, 62.6% were married couples living together, 6.6% had a female householder with no husband present, and 27.4% were non-families. 22.0% of all households were made up of individuals, and 5.6% had someone living alone who was 65 years of age or older. The average household size was 2.54 and the average family size was 2.98.

In the CDP, the population was spread out, with 25.3% under the age of 18, 5.0% from 18 to 24, 23.3% from 25 to 44, 36.2% from 45 to 64, and 10.3% who were 65 years of age or older. The median age was 44 years. For every 100 females, there were 102.1 males. For every 100 females age 18 and over, there were 100.9 males.

The median income for a household in the CDP was $67,708, and the median income for a family was $79,342. Males had a median income of $54,048 versus $36,793 for females. The per capita income for the CDP was $38,233. About 3.1% of families and 3.6% of the population were below the poverty line, including 3.0% of those under age 18 and 5.0% of those age 65 or over.

== History ==
Verdi was named after Giuseppe Verdi by Charles Crocker, founder of the Central Pacific Railroad, pulling a slip of paper from a hat and reading the name of the Italian opera composer.
