= Nevada State Route 401 =

Highway in Nevada

State Route 401
- Rye Patch Road
- SR 401 highlighted in red

Route information
- Maintained by NDOT
- Length: 2.347 mi (3.777 km)

Major junctions
- West end: Rye Patch State Rec Area
- East end: I-80 / US 95 northeast of Lovelock

Location
- Country: United States
- State: Nevada
- Counties: Pershing

Highway system
- Nevada State Highway System; Interstate; US; State; Pre‑1976; Scenic
← SR 400	→ SR 425

State Route 401 (SR 401) is a state highway in Pershing County, Nevada. The route, known as Rye Patch Road, serves the Rye Patch State Recreation Area.

== Route description ==
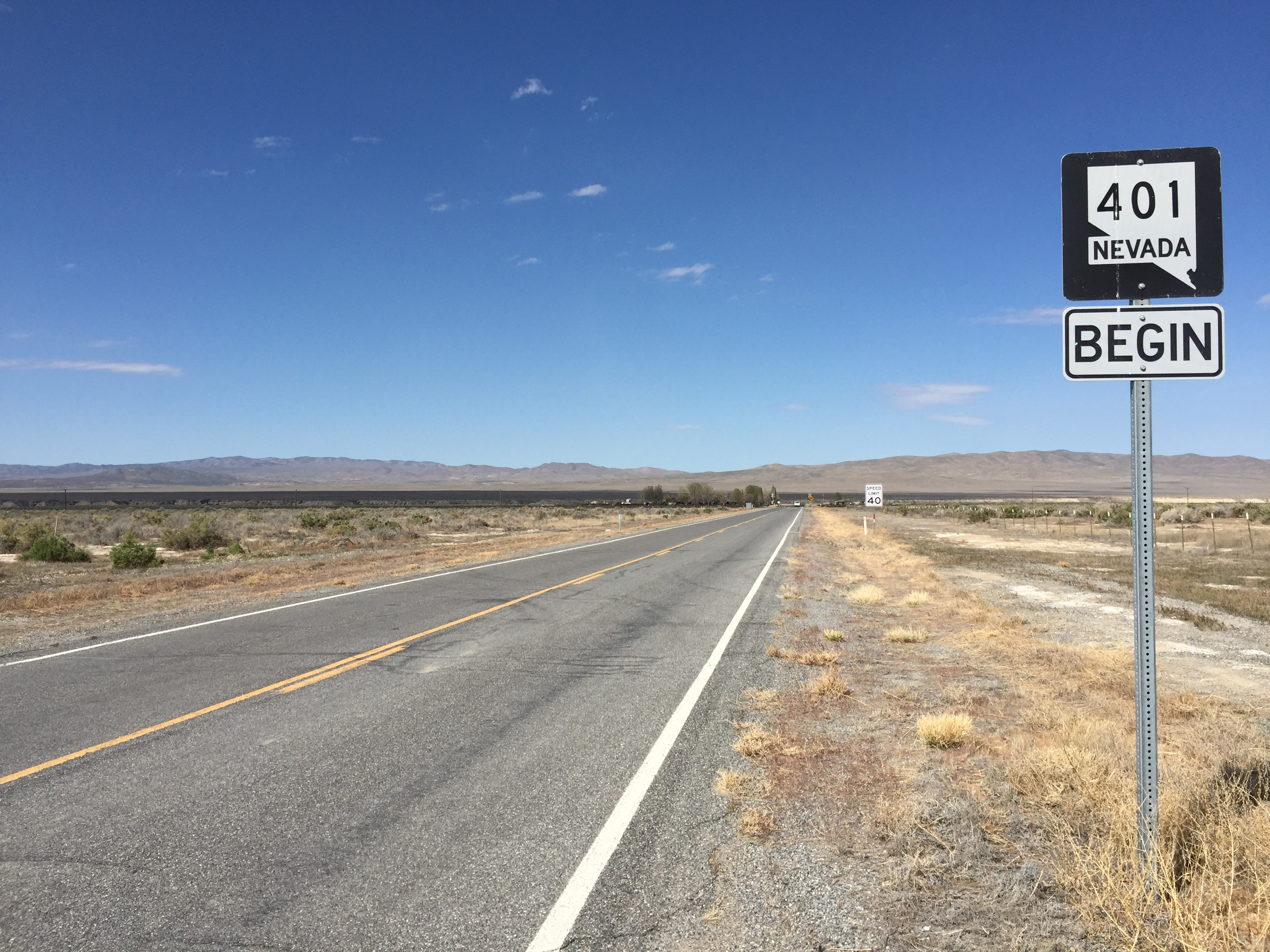
First reassurance sign along westbound SR 401

The western terminus of Rye Patch Road is at a parking lot adjacent to a day use area on the southwestern shore of the Rye Patch Reservoir. From there, SR 401 loops around to head eastward, providing additional campground and recreation area access. The highway follows the southern edge of the reservoir and crosses the Humboldt River on Rye Patch Dam before cutting through mountains and continuing eastward. SR 401 reaches its eastern terminus at Interstate 80/U.S. Route 95, about 22 miles (35 km) north-northeast of Lovelock.

== History ==
SR 401 was added to the state highway system on July 30, 1976.

== Major intersections ==
The entire route is in Pershing County.

Location	mi	km	Destinations	Notes
Rye Patch State Rec Area	0.00	0.00	Rye Patch west day use area	Western terminus
Rye Patch State Rec Area			Rye Patch Dam on Humboldt River	
	2.33	3.75	I-80 / US 95 – Lovelock, Winnemucca	Eastern terminus; I-80 exit 129
1.000 mi = 1.609 km; 1.000 km = 0.621 mi
