= Toulon (disambiguation) =

Toulon is a city on the south coast of France.

Toulon may also refer to:

- RC Toulonnais, a rugby union club in the French city
- Toulon-sur-Arroux, Saône-et-Loire, France
- Toulon, Illinois, United States
- Toulon, Kansas, United States
- Toulon, Nevada, United States
- Toulon Tournament, a soccer tournament
- Toulon (horse), a racehorse
- Mailu Island, known as Toulon Island, in Papua New Guinea
