= Ola, Nevada =

- Ghost town
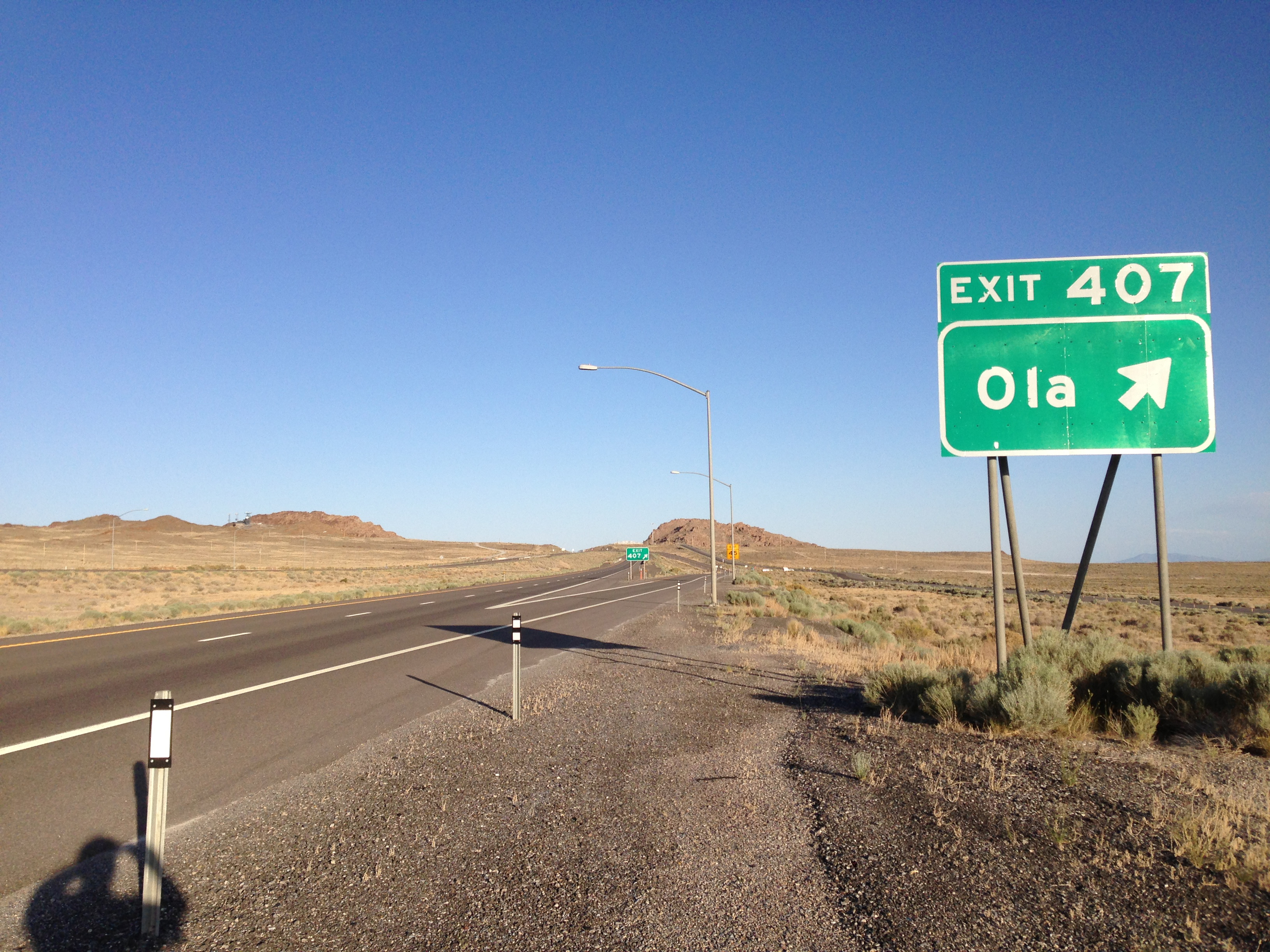
- Ola exit on Interstate 80, June 2014

- Location in the state of Nevada Ola (the United States)
- Coordinates: 40°43′17″N 114°08′48″W
- Country: United States
- State: Nevada
- County: Elko
- Elevation: 4,626 ft (1,410 m)
- Time zone: UTC-8 (PST)
  - Summer (DST): UTC-7 (PDT)
- GNIS feature ID: 856332

Ola is a ghost town and railroad siding in eastern Elko County, Nevada, United States.

== Description ==
The site of the former community is located on the western edge of the Great Salt Lake Desert, just west of West Wendover and about 3.2 miles (5.1 km) southwest of the Ola Interchange (Exit 407) on Interstate 80 in Nevada/U.S. Route 93 Alternate. Other than a railroad siding, almost nothing remains at the site.
