= Emigrant Pass (Nevada) =

Mountain pass in Eureka County, Nevada, USA

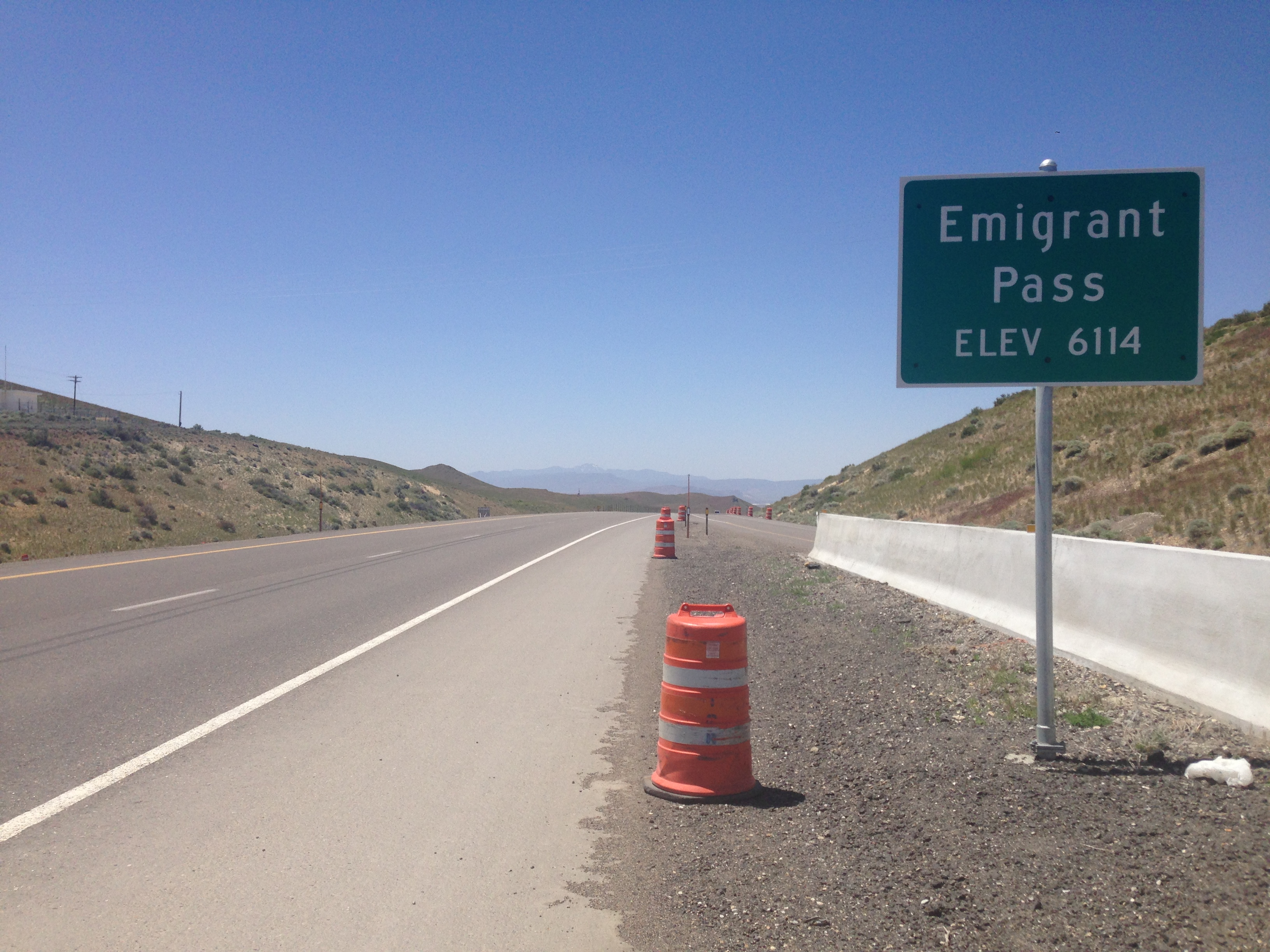
- Sign for Emigrant Pass along I-80
- Interactive map of Emigrant Pass
- Elevation: 6,125 ft (1,867 m)
- Traversed by: I-80 (Dwight D. Eisenhower Highway / Purple Heart Trail)

Third Approach
- Location: Eureka County, Nevada, United States
- Range: Emigrant Hills
- Coordinates: 40°39′19″N 116°16′25″W

Emigrant Pass is a mountain pass in Eureka County, Nevada, United States. It originally carried the California Trail over the Emigrant Hills of northern Eureka County, reaching a peak elevation of 6,125 feet (1,867 m). Interstate 80 now follows the California Trail's route over the pass. The small town of Primeaux is just west of the pass.
