= Nevada State Route 230 =

State highway in Elko County, Nevada, United States

State Route 230
- Starr Valley Road

Route information
- Maintained by NDOT
- Length: 13.085 mi (21.058 km)
- Existed: 1992–present
- History: 1962, Starr Valley Road constructed

Major junctions
- West end: I-80 in Deeth
- East end: I-80 in Welcome

Location
- Country: United States
- State: Nevada
- Counties: Elko

Highway system
- Nevada State Highway System; Interstate; US; State; Pre‑1976; Scenic
← SR 229	→ SR 231

State Route 230 (SR 230) is a state highway central Elko County, Nevada, United States. It is a southern loop route off of Interstate 80 (I‑80) between Elko and Wells, serving the communities of Deeth and Welcome and various ranches within Starr Valley. The road follows a U-shaped path and passes close to the East Humboldt Range. The road was constructed by 1962, but was not designated as a state highway until 1992.

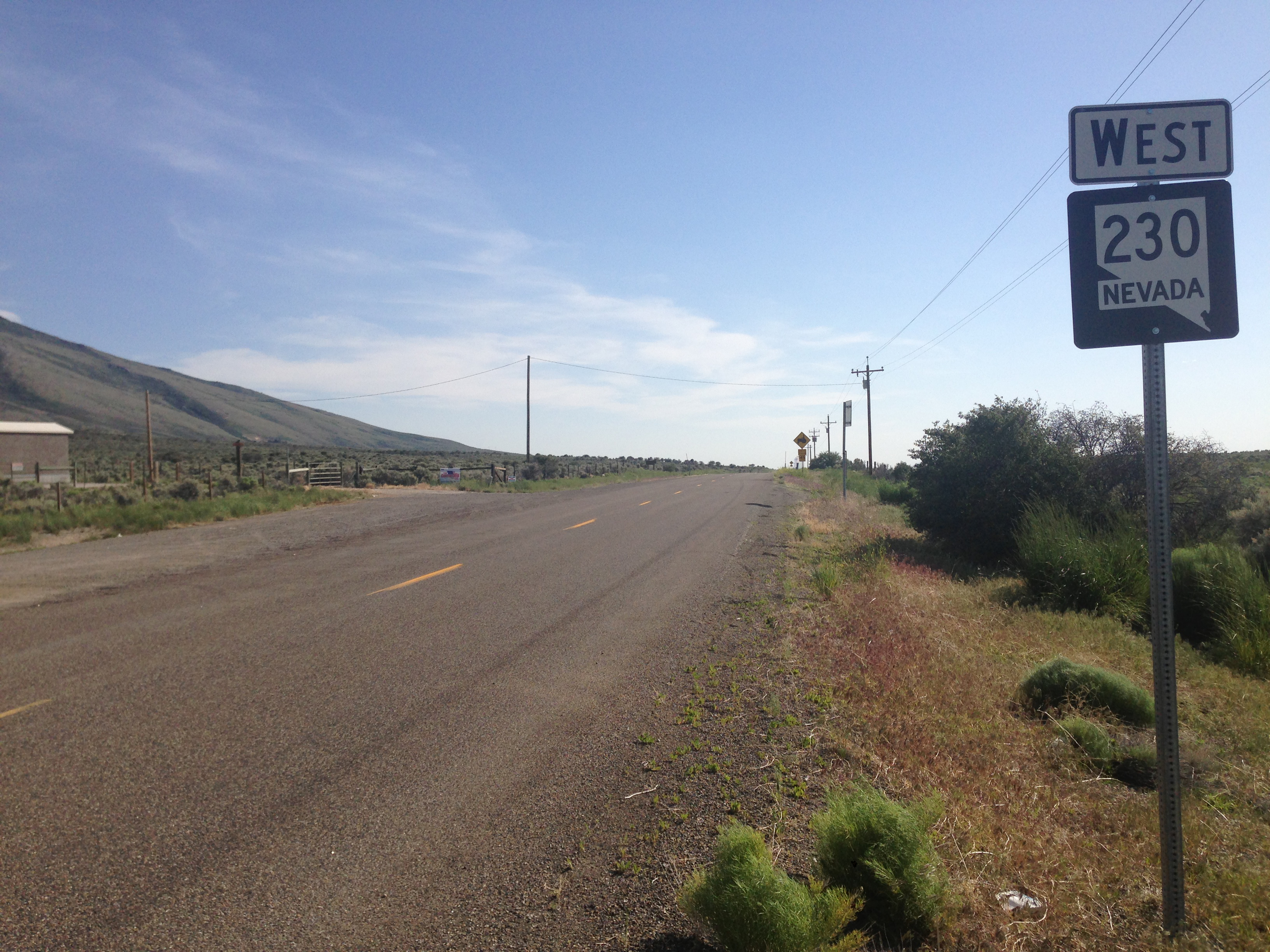
Looking westward along SR 230 in Welcome, June 2014

== Route description ==
SR 230 begins at I-80 at the Starr Valley Interchange, Exit 333. From its western terminus, SR 230 heads southward into the community of Deeth, where it meets County Road 753. After crossing over the Marys River and, quickly thereafter, the Humboldt River, SR 230 meets Starr Valley Loop (which continues south to Nevada State Route 229) before heading eastward. After about 1.7 miles (2.7 km), the route turns northeast, passing near the edge of the Humboldt National Forest. The road then turns abruptly northward to meet its end at the Welcome Interchange, Exit 343 of I‑80.

== History ==
The road has existed as Starr Valley Road since 1962, even before I-80 replaced U.S. Route 40 (US 40) in the area. After I-80 was designated in the area, the bridge over I-80 in Deeth was completed in 1965, and the bridge at the east terminus in 1968. The bridges over the Humboldt and Mary's Rivers were completed in 1983. It was not until 1992, however, until this road was formally designated a state highway by NDOT. Since establishment, the alignment of the route has not changed.

== Major intersections ==
The entire route is in Elko County.

Location	mi	km	Destinations	Notes
Deeth	0.000	0.000	I-80 – Elko, Wells	Interchange; western terminus; I-80 exit 333
Welcome	13.085	21.058	I-80 – Elko, Wells	Interchange; eastern terminus; I-80 exit 343
1.000 mi = 1.609 km; 1.000 km = 0.621 mi

== See also ==
- List of state highways in Nevada
