= Primeaux, Nevada =

Unincorporated community in Nevada, US

- Unincorporated community
- Location within Nevada Location within the United States
- Coordinates: 40°38′56″N 116°18′06″W
- Country: United States
- State: Nevada
- County: Eureka
- Elevation: 5,719 ft (1,743 m)
- Time zone: UTC-8 (Pacific (PST))
  - Summer (DST): UTC-7 (PDT)
- Area code: 775
- GNIS feature ID: 856111

Primeaux is an unincorporated community in Eureka County, Nevada, United States.

In 1926, the year after U.S. Route 40 was built, Roy Primeaux moved his cabins from Tuscarora, Nevada to a location just west of Emigrant Pass. Travelers would often need to stop at Primeaux for radiator water after climbing the pass. In addition to spring water, Primeaux Station offered gas, tires and cabins.

In the 1930s, Primeaux was a bus and tourist stop.

During World War II, Chinese relics from Tuscarora were exhibited at Primeaux.

In 1961, the station at Primeaux was auctioned off so that Interstate 80 could be built. The auction included the station (constructed of railroad ties), a two-story frame house, gas pumps and other items.
