= Jessup, Nevada =

- Ghost town
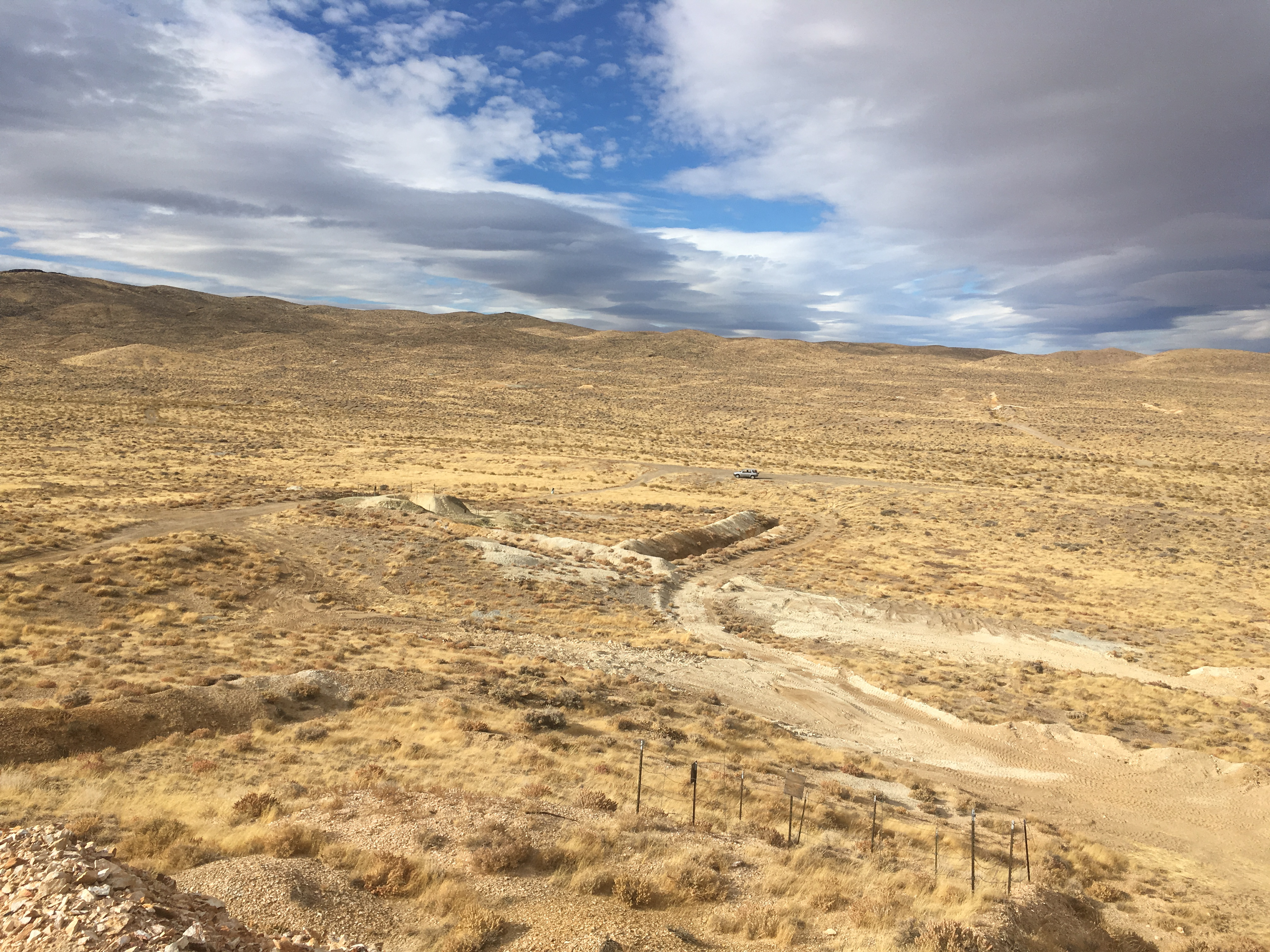
- Jessup site taken from a nearby hill

- Location within Nevada Location within the United States
- Coordinates: 39°56′55″N 118°52′30″W
- Country: United States
- State: Nevada
- County: Churchill County
- Elevation: 4,551 ft (1,387 m)

Jessup, also briefly known as White Canyon, is a ghost town in Churchill County, Nevada, United States. It was founded in 1908 after gold and silver mine claims were located. At its peak, it supported a population of around 300, with grocery stores and a post office, among other things. There are at least eight formerly active mines in the area. It is located a few miles north of Interstate 80 between Fernley and Lovelock. Southern Pacific provided prospectors access to the town by stopping in nearby White Plains. All that remains today is a few dilapidated wood buildings and abandoned mines.

== History ==
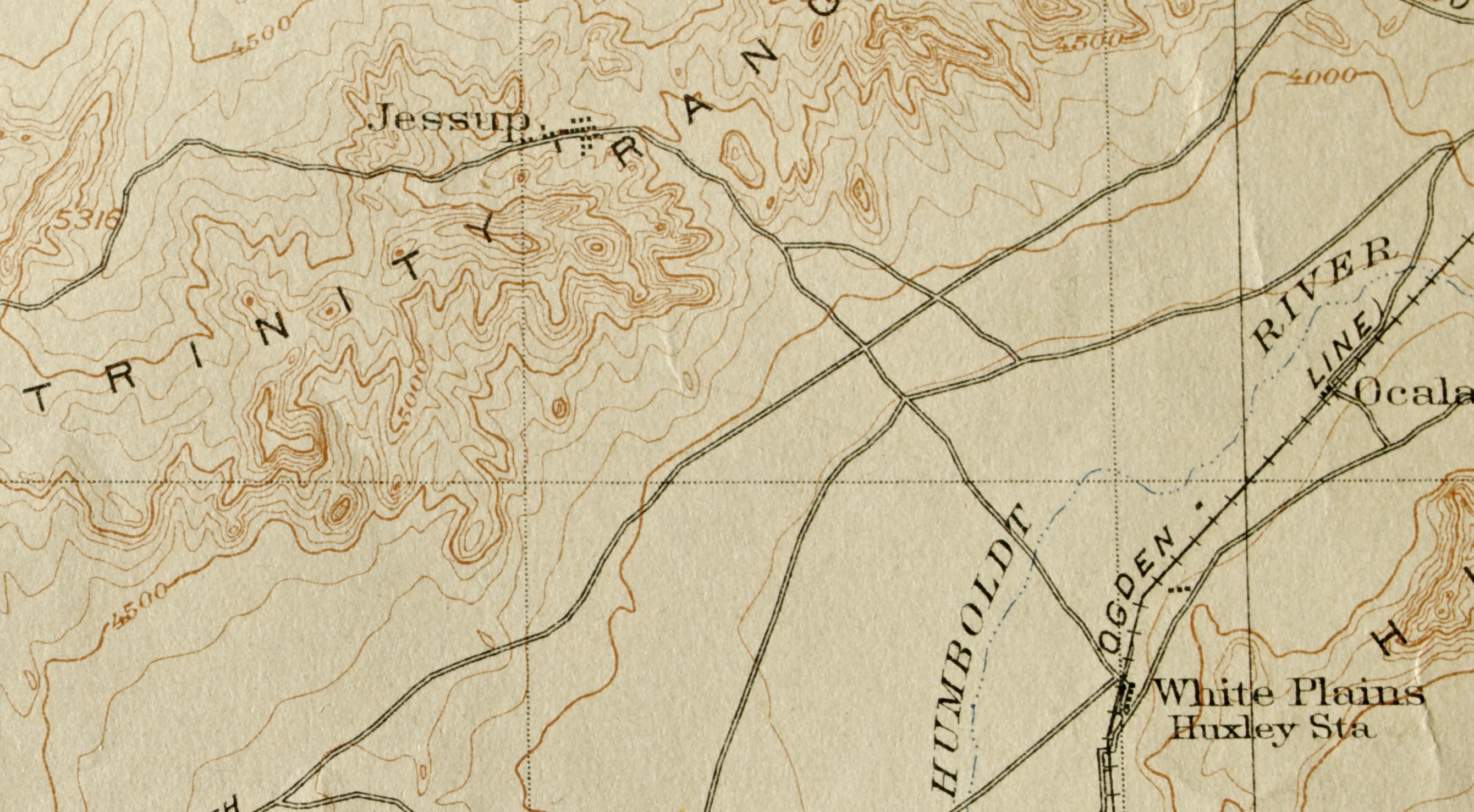
Topo map from 1910 showing Jessup.

The mining area was discovered by Frank Jessup and L.H. Murray in January or February 1908. Within a month of its founding, there were more than 300 people present with the population steadily growing. The Jessup Mining District was quickly established as the discovery was found to be of more worth than earlier expected. By April of that year, it was reported by the Reno Evening Gazette that lumber was coming in by the carloads and that wooden structures were quickly being erected to replace the tents located at the camp. There was such a shortage of wood that construction of a hotel and other buildings had to be put on hold until enough lumber could arrive in the town.

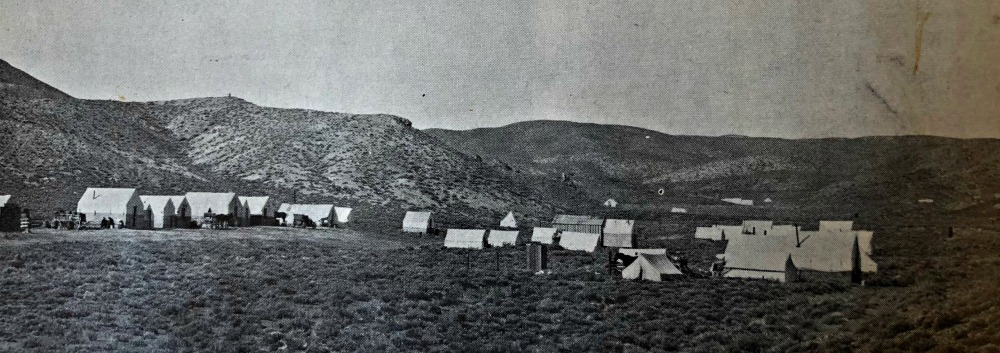
Early days in Jessup, 1908

A year after it was founded, citizens petitioned the county to build a new road to connect Jessup to Miriam. This new road would allow heavy loads and ore shipments to access the railroad without traversing the salt flats. These salt flats were often muddy, which caused delays. By summer of 1909, work had begun to slow. Despite this, there were continued investments made in the area surrounding Jessup.

Another discovery was made in the area in 1929.

== Geology ==
The Jessup area is located in a volcanic caldera with gold near the edge. Volcanism began with an eruption that was a few hundred meters thick and produced a tuff deposit. This eruption led to the caldera-forming collapse of the ground above the magma chamber. Erosion in the caldera has produced isolated pockets of andesite sand. Further eruptions caused a second caldera collapse.

Some of the rocks in the area have been dated to the Jurassic era. Basalt, andesite and rhyolite are among the volcanic material surrounding the ghost town.

== Legacy ==
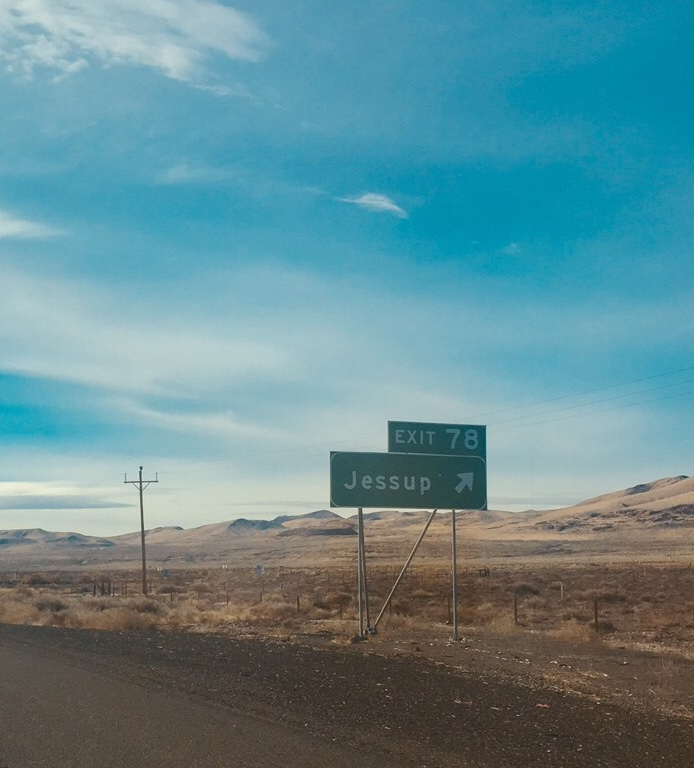
Exit sign off Interstate 80 showing Jessup.

Despite no longer having any residents, Jessup can be found on signs at Exit 78 on Interstate 80. It is accessible via the gravel road leading north from the junction. At the site, there is not much left aside from an old pickup and some rusted metal. There are abandoned mines in the area. Many of these mines have barbed wire fences around them. The area is heavily littered.

A few miles west of Jessup there is the remains of a cabin at one of the old claims. A little to the northeast there is the remains of another mining operation. Visitors can find the remains of a cabin there, as well as some old equipment.

Since 2012, Jessup has been the home of Nevada's tallest radio tower, The Shamrock-Jessup Tower which is home to six radio stations. The tower is 1,464 feet in elevation above ground.
