= Deeth, Nevada =

Unincorporated community in Nevada, U.S.

- Unincorporated community & Census-designated places
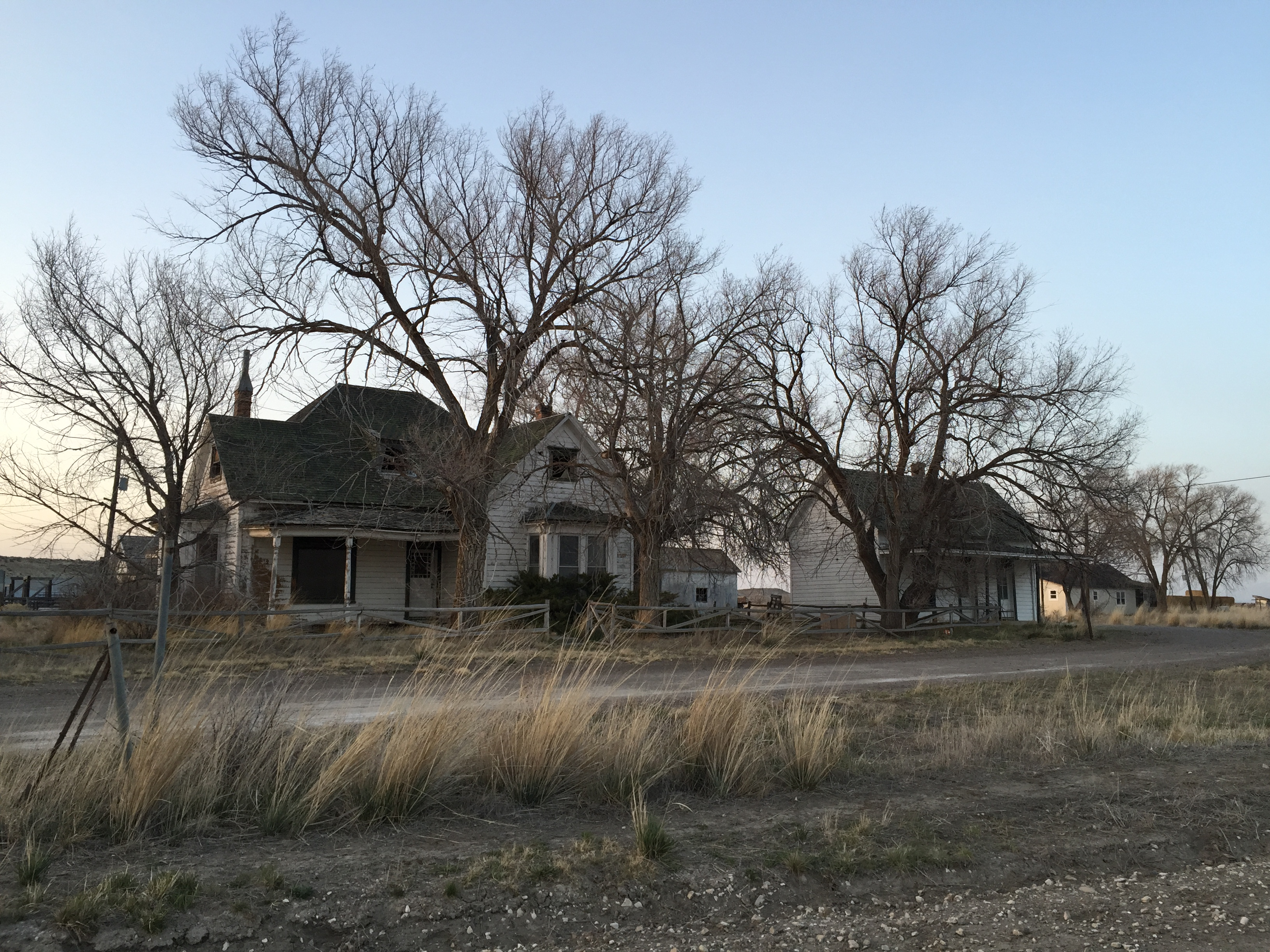
- Buildings in Deeth

- Location within the state of Nevada
- Coordinates: 41°03′56″N 115°16′29″W
- Country: United States
- State: Nevada
- County: Elko
- Elevation: 5,341 ft (1,628 m)
- Time zone: UTC-8 (Pacific (PST))
  - Summer (DST): UTC-7 (PDT)
- ZIP code: 89823
- Area code: 775
- GNIS feature ID: 845424

Deeth (Shoshoni: Teai) is an unincorporated community and census-designated place near the intersection of Interstate 80 and Nevada State Route 230 in Elko County, Nevada, United States.

== History ==
When the Central Pacific started running past this site in 1869, a branch line station with telegraph was established. In 1875, a post office was established for nearby ranches and farms. The community was named after a pioneer citizen.

As ranching and mining activity increased in the area the town grew in size. The Western Pacific began running through Deeth in 1910. At the time, the community had mercantile stores, a Mormon chapel, livery stables, hotels, saloons, a blacksmith and a population of approximately 250. Many dairies and farms were in the county, and this town served as a depot to ship cattle and a trading center for local ranchers and ranchers from nearby counties.

In 1915, a fire destroyed most of the town. The post office has been in operation at Deeth since 1875. Little remains of the original community.

== Climate ==
According to the Köppen Climate Classification system, Deeth has a warm-summer humid continental climate, abbreviated "Dfb" on climate maps.

Climate data for Deeth, Nevada, 1991–2020 normals, 1951-2020 extremes: 5340ft (1628m)
Month	Jan	Feb	Mar	Apr	May	Jun	Jul	Aug	Sep	Oct	Nov	Dec	Year
Record high °F (°C)	63 (17)	69 (21)	79 (26)	84 (29)	93 (34)	99 (37)	101 (38)	100 (38)	98 (37)	93 (34)	75 (24)	62 (17)	101 (38)
Mean maximum °F (°C)	48 (9)	54 (12)	65 (18)	74 (23)	84 (29)	90 (32)	96 (36)	95 (35)	90 (32)	80 (27)	65 (18)	50 (10)	95 (35)
Mean daily maximum °F (°C)	35.1 (1.7)	39.5 (4.2)	51.6 (10.9)	58.9 (14.9)	69.0 (20.6)	78.6 (25.9)	88.2 (31.2)	87.3 (30.7)	77.8 (25.4)	64.3 (17.9)	48.1 (8.9)	37.2 (2.9)	61.3 (16.3)
Daily mean °F (°C)	22.6 (−5.2)	27.0 (−2.8)	36.7 (2.6)	43.0 (6.1)	51.6 (10.9)	59.4 (15.2)	66.5 (19.2)	64.2 (17.9)	55.5 (13.1)	43.8 (6.6)	32.2 (0.1)	24.0 (−4.4)	43.9 (6.6)
Mean daily minimum °F (°C)	10.0 (−12.2)	14.5 (−9.7)	21.7 (−5.7)	27.2 (−2.7)	34.3 (1.3)	40.2 (4.6)	44.7 (7.1)	41.0 (5.0)	33.2 (0.7)	23.3 (−4.8)	16.4 (−8.7)	10.7 (−11.8)	26.4 (−3.1)
Mean minimum °F (°C)	−17 (−27)	−10 (−23)	3 (−16)	14 (−10)	21 (−6)	29 (−2)	34 (1)	29 (−2)	18 (−8)	8 (−13)	−3 (−19)	−14 (−26)	−21 (−29)
Record low °F (°C)	−36 (−38)	−31 (−35)	−22 (−30)	5 (−15)	9 (−13)	19 (−7)	26 (−3)	18 (−8)	8 (−13)	−5 (−21)	−18 (−28)	−42 (−41)	−42 (−41)
Average precipitation inches (mm)	1.23 (31)	1.08 (27)	1.18 (30)	1.67 (42)	1.74 (44)	0.81 (21)	0.34 (8.6)	0.48 (12)	0.63 (16)	1.03 (26)	1.00 (25)	1.16 (29)	12.35 (311.6)
Source 1: NOAA
Source 2: XMACIS2 (records)

Climate data for Deeth
Month	Jan	Feb	Mar	Apr	May	Jun	Jul	Aug	Sep	Oct	Nov	Dec	Year
Record high °F (°C)	63 (17)	69 (21)	78 (26)	84 (29)	93 (34)	99 (37)	101 (38)	100 (38)	98 (37)	86 (30)	75 (24)	62 (17)	101 (38)
Mean daily maximum °F (°C)	35.5 (1.9)	40.2 (4.6)	48.7 (9.3)	58.9 (14.9)	68.3 (20.2)	77.6 (25.3)	87.9 (31.1)	86.3 (30.2)	77.6 (25.3)	64.9 (18.3)	47.9 (8.8)	36.8 (2.7)	60.9 (16.1)
Mean daily minimum °F (°C)	8.8 (−12.9)	13.5 (−10.3)	20.5 (−6.4)	26.5 (−3.1)	33.9 (1.1)	39.7 (4.3)	43.3 (6.3)	40.6 (4.8)	32.2 (0.1)	23.1 (−4.9)	16.9 (−8.4)	9.6 (−12.4)	25.7 (−3.5)
Record low °F (°C)	−36 (−38)	−31 (−35)	−22 (−30)	5 (−15)	9 (−13)	19 (−7)	26 (−3)	18 (−8)	8 (−13)	−5 (−21)	−18 (−28)	−42 (−41)	−42 (−41)
Average precipitation inches (mm)	1.16 (29)	0.87 (22)	1.19 (30)	1.38 (35)	1.69 (43)	1.13 (29)	0.41 (10)	0.47 (12)	0.75 (19)	0.83 (21)	1.12 (28)	1.03 (26)	12.02 (305)
Average snowfall inches (cm)	5.9 (15)	3 (7.6)	3.2 (8.1)	1.9 (4.8)	0.4 (1.0)	0 (0)	0 (0)	0 (0)	0 (0)	0.3 (0.76)	1.8 (4.6)	5 (13)	21.6 (55)
Average precipitation days	7	6	8	7	7	5	3	3	3	4	6	6	65
Source: WRCC
