= Hunter, Nevada =

Ghost town in Elko County, Nevada, United States

Coordinates: 40°45′10″N 115°54′12″W

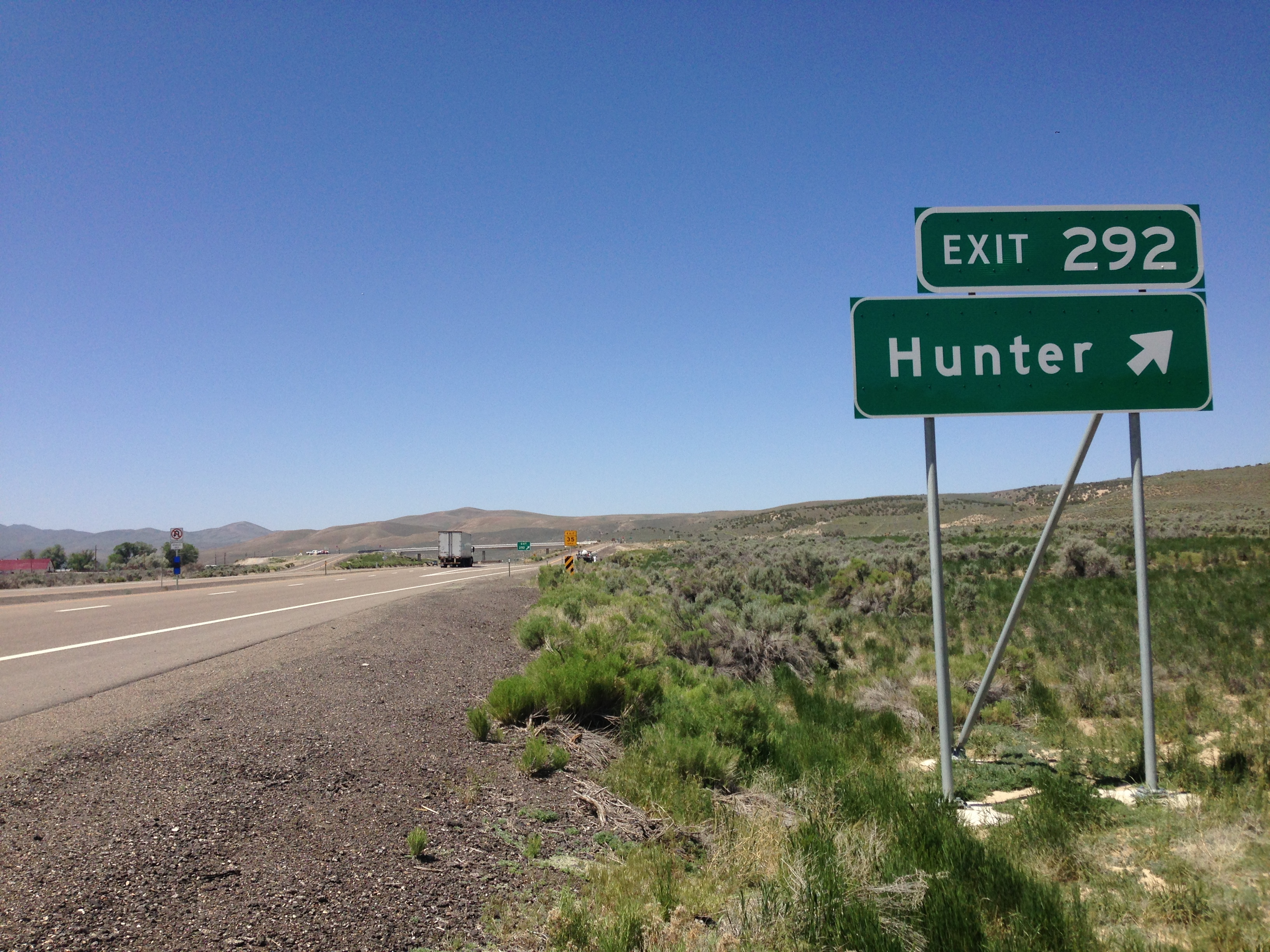
Hunter exit on westbound Interstate 80, May 2014

Hunter is a ghost town along the Humboldt River in Elko County, Nevada, United States.

== History ==
In 1871 lead and silver were found in Hunter. In 1877 a post office was established there. In those days, Hunter had six saloons, a blacksmith shop, restaurants, two stores and 40 to 50 homes. Mines were idle in 1884 but resurged by 1905. In 1872, mines at Hunter produced $208,000 in material. However, the Hunter District had to pay a high tax. Ore was discovered in the area, leading to mines that attracted more attention. This caused the population to reach a peak population of 80 inhabitants in 1877. By these times, Hunter had 40 houses, restaurants, several saloons and a post office. The early years of the 20th century were the start of the end of Hunter. Now, only smelter ruins mark the site of the old town.
