= Elburz, Nevada =

Unincorporated community in Nevada, U.S.

- Unincorporated community
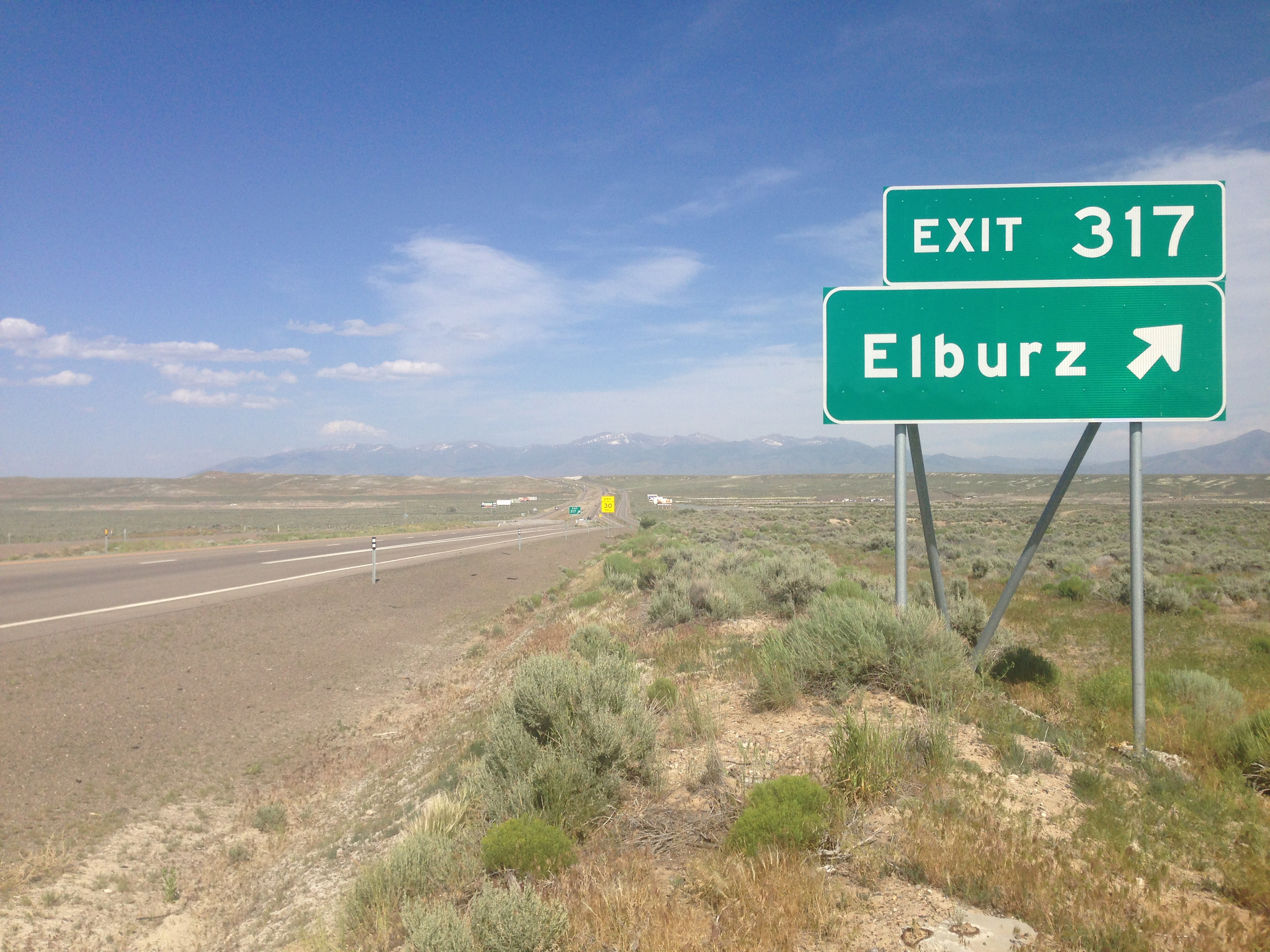
- Elburz exit on Interstate 80

- Location in the state of Nevada
- Coordinates: 40°55′43″N 115°30′05″W
- Country: United States
- State: Nevada
- County: Elko
- Elevation: 5,207 ft (1,587 m)
- Time zone: UTC-8 (PST)
  - Summer (DST): UTC-7 (PDT)
- GNIS feature ID: 856020

Elburz is an unincorporated community in Elko County, Nevada, United States. It is located along Interstate 80 between Elko and Wells.

The first permanent settlement at Elburz was made before 1910. The community received its name from the railroad.
