= Toulon, Nevada =

- Ghost town
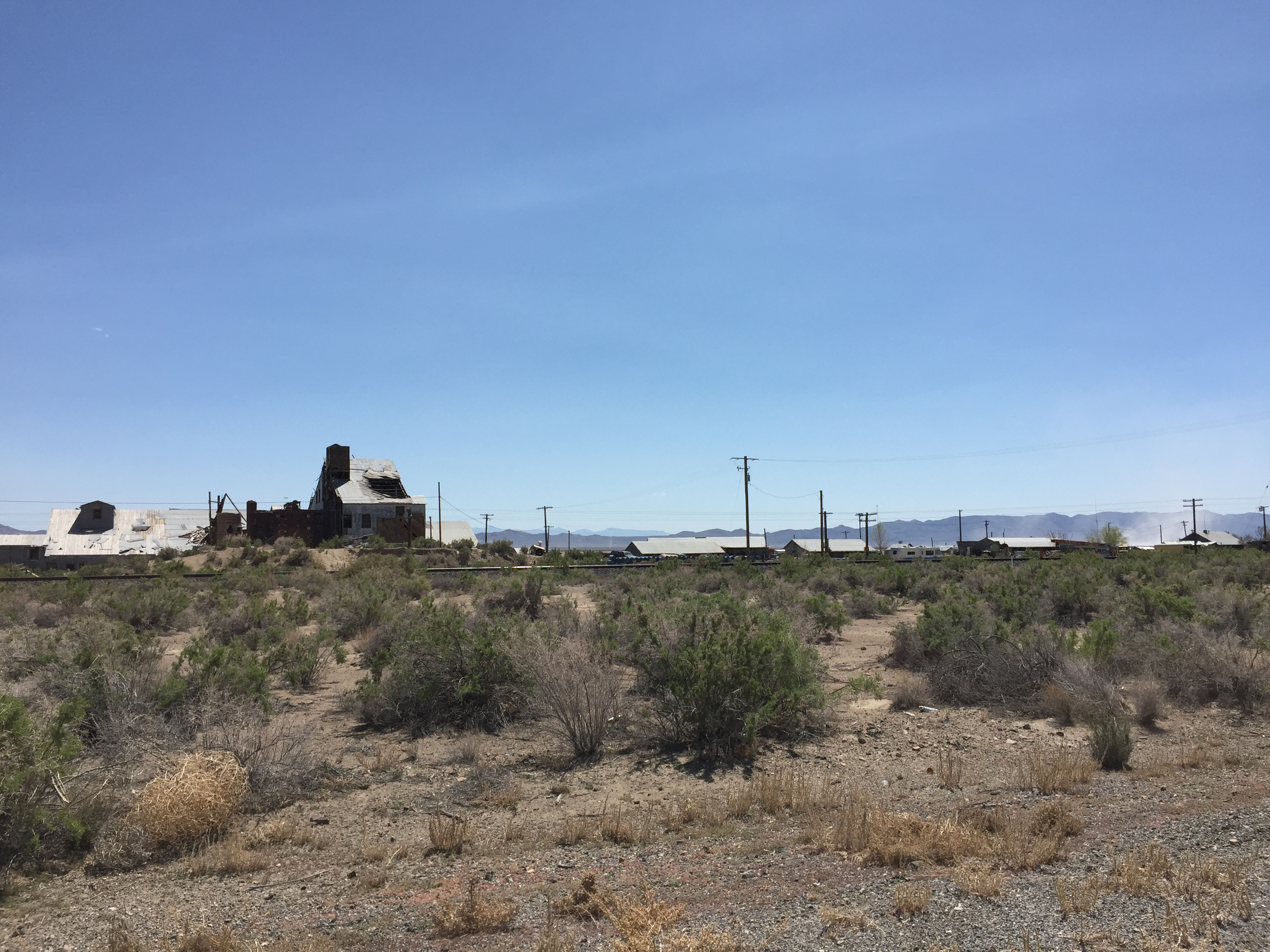
- Abandoned buildings in Toulon

- Location in the state of Nevada Toulon, Nevada (the United States)
- Coordinates: 40°03′46″N 118°38′42″W
- Country: United States
- State: Nevada
- County: Pershing
- Elevation: 3,927 ft (1,197 m)
- Time zone: UTC-8 (PST)
  - Summer (DST): UTC-7 (PDT)

Toulon is a former non-agency railroad station in Pershing County, Nevada, United States.

Carlson states that the name may commemorate Toulon, France.

Toulon is visible from Interstate 80.

== History ==
In between 1916 and 1918, a tungsten concentrator was erected at Toulon. The concentrator processed scheelite ore from the Ragged Top Mining District near Ragged Top Mountain. In 1918, the mill was turned in to an arsenic mill that processed ore from near Battle Mountain.

The mill was acquired in 1929, but remained idle until 1936, when it was refurbished. The mill played an important role refining tungsten ore from Nevada and California during WWII including a 1943 addition of a flotation plant. The plant was operated in the 1930s and 40s by Ott Heizer, who was the father of Robert Heizer, the archaeologist and grandfather of Michael Heizer, the land artist and sculptor.

== External Resources ==
- Toulon (nvexpeditions.com)
