= Nevada State Route 425 =

Highway in Nevada

State Route 425
- Interstate 80 Business, Third Street, Old U.S. 40
- SR 425 highlighted in red

Route information
- Maintained by NDOT
- Length: 3.437 mi (5.531 km)
- Existed: July 1, 1976–present

Major junctions
- West end: Gold Ranch Road in Verdi
- East end: I-80 in Verdi

Location
- Country: United States
- State: Nevada
- County: Washoe

Highway system
- Interstate Highway System; Main; Auxiliary; Suffixed; Business; Future; Nevada State Highway System; Interstate; US; State; Pre‑1976; Scenic
← SR 401	→ SR 427

State Route 425 (SR 425) is a 3.437-mile-long (5.531 km) state highway that serves the town of Verdi in Washoe County, Nevada. Interstate 80 Business is routed along the highway and extends beyond the terminus of the state route. SR 425 was formerly a part of SR 1 and U.S. Route 40 (US 40).

== Route description ==
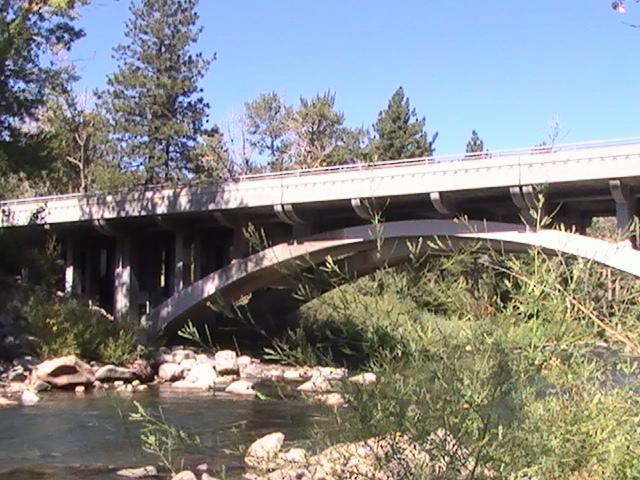
SR 425 crosses the Truckee River in Verdi as seen in 2008

SR 425 begins at the intersection of Third Street, Gold Ranch Road, and a state maintained frontage road in Verdi, near the West Verdi interchange (Exit 2) with Interstate 80. The highway follows Third Street northeast through the center of Verdi, then southeast to its terminus at the I-80 East Verdi interchange (Exit 5).

Although designated a state route and an Interstate business route, there are no route shields posted along the highway itself.

The I-80 business route extends beyond the end of SR 425. From the highway's western terminus, I-80 Business follows Gold Ranch Road an additional 0.939 miles (1.511 km) south to end at an I-80 westbound onramp.

== History ==
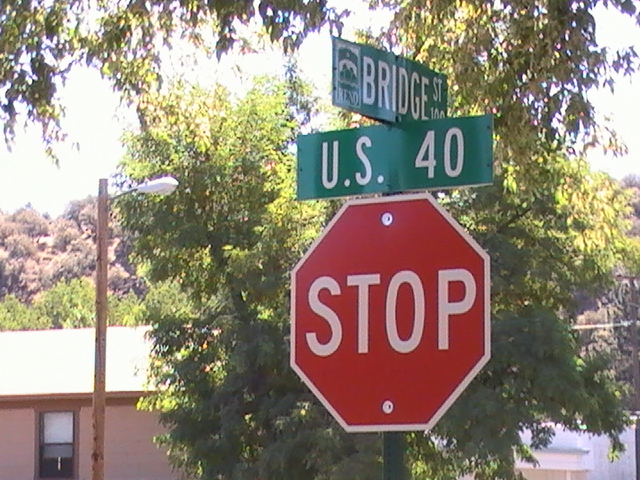
As of August 2008, some street signs along SR 425 still say "U.S. 40". US 40 was removed from Verdi in 1966.

The highway originally carried State Route 1 and later U.S. Route 40 on its trek west from Reno over Donner Pass towards Sacramento, California. As Interstate 80 was being completed in the 1960s, it was largely replacing US 40 throughout the western United States. US 40 was truncated to a western terminus in Reno by 1966, officially removing the route from Verdi; however, some 1970s era maps still showed US 40 in Verdi.

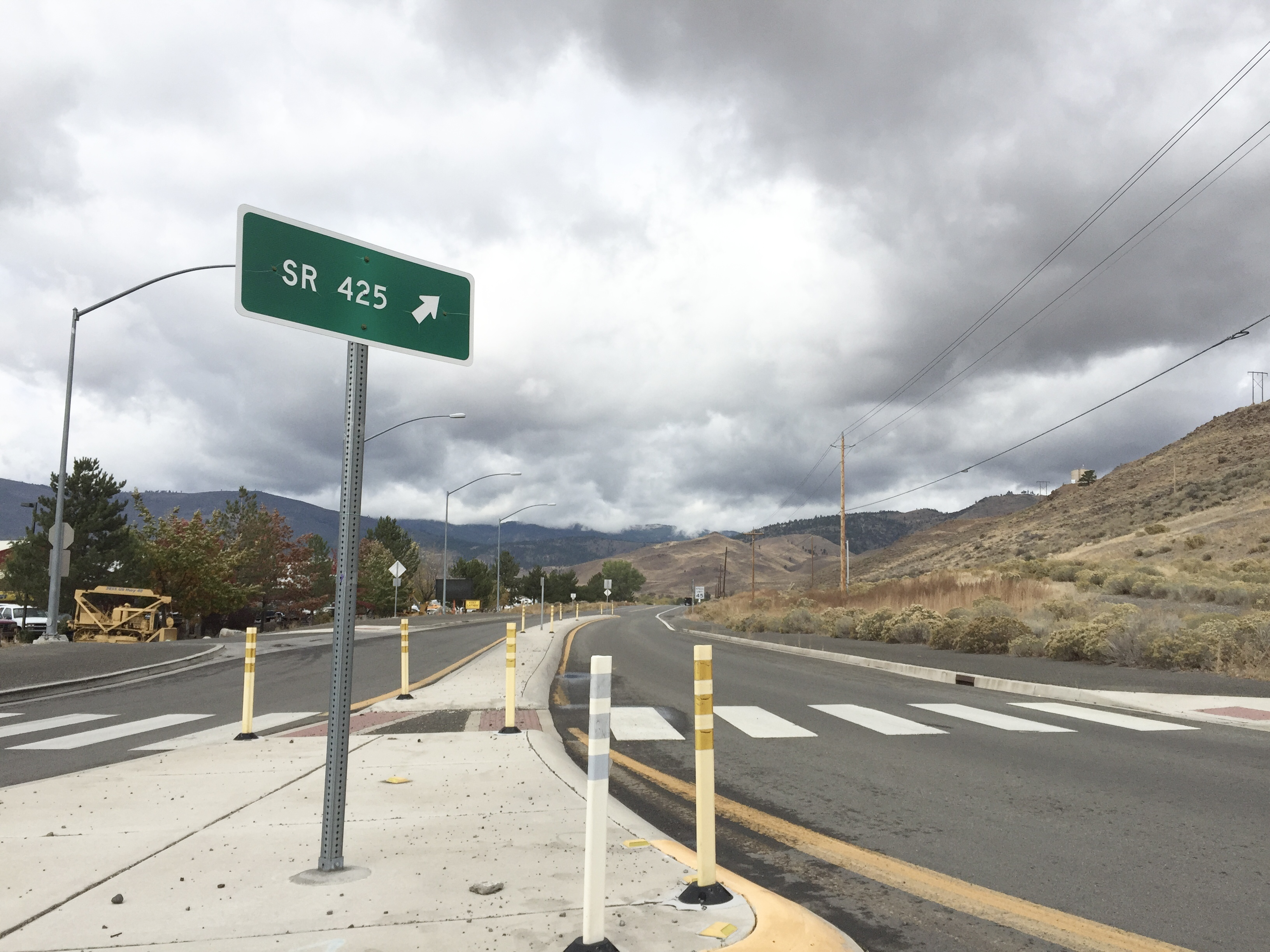
View west along SR 425 just east of Verdi as seen in 2015

With the Nevada state highway renumbering that occurred in the mid 1970s, State Route 425 was assigned to Old US 40 through Verdi.

== Major intersections ==
The entire route is in Verdi, Washoe County.

mi	km	Destinations	Notes
2.84	4.57	I-80 BL (Gold Ranch Road) / Frontage Road	To I-80 – Reno, Sacramento
6.20	9.98	I-80 east – Reno	I-80 exit 5
1.000 mi = 1.609 km; 1.000 km = 0.621 mi
