= Mogul, Nevada =

- Census-designated place
- Location of Mogul, Nevada
- Coordinates: 39°30′49″N 119°55′33″W
- Country: United States
- State: Nevada

Area
  - Total: 1.46 sq mi (3.78 km^{2})
  - Land: 1.45 sq mi (3.76 km^{2})
  - Water: 0.0039 sq mi (0.01 km^{2})
- Elevation: 4,701 ft (1,433 m)

Population (2020)
  - Total: 1,258
  - Density: 865.4/sq mi (334.15/km^{2})
- Time zone: UTC-8 (Pacific (PST))
  - Summer (DST): UTC-7 (PDT)
- ZIP code: 89523
- FIPS code: 32-48000
- GNIS feature ID: 2583942

Mogul is a census-designated place (CDP) in Washoe County, Nevada, United States. It lies on the western side of the Reno–Sparks Metropolitan Statistical Area, just off Interstate 80. As of the 2020 census, Mogul had a population of 1,258. Prior to 2010, the community was part of the Verdi-Mogul CDP.

== Geography ==
Mogul is located at 39°30′49″N 119°55′33″W (39.5138, -119.9260). It lies along Interstate 80, 6 miles (10 km) west of downtown Reno, near the western border of Nevada.

According to the United States Census Bureau, the CDP has a total area of 1.5 square miles (3.8 km^{2}), all land.

The area is served by the Washoe County School District.

== 2008 earthquake swarm ==
In February 2008, an earthquake swarm began and activity was high until June 2008. The total number of earthquakes in the area reached over 5,000 and ranged from negative magnitudes to a moment magnitude 5.0 mainshock on April 26, 2008.

== Demographics ==
Historical population
Census	Pop.	Note	%±
2020	1,258		—
U.S. Decennial Census
