= Verdi, Nevada =

- Census-designated place
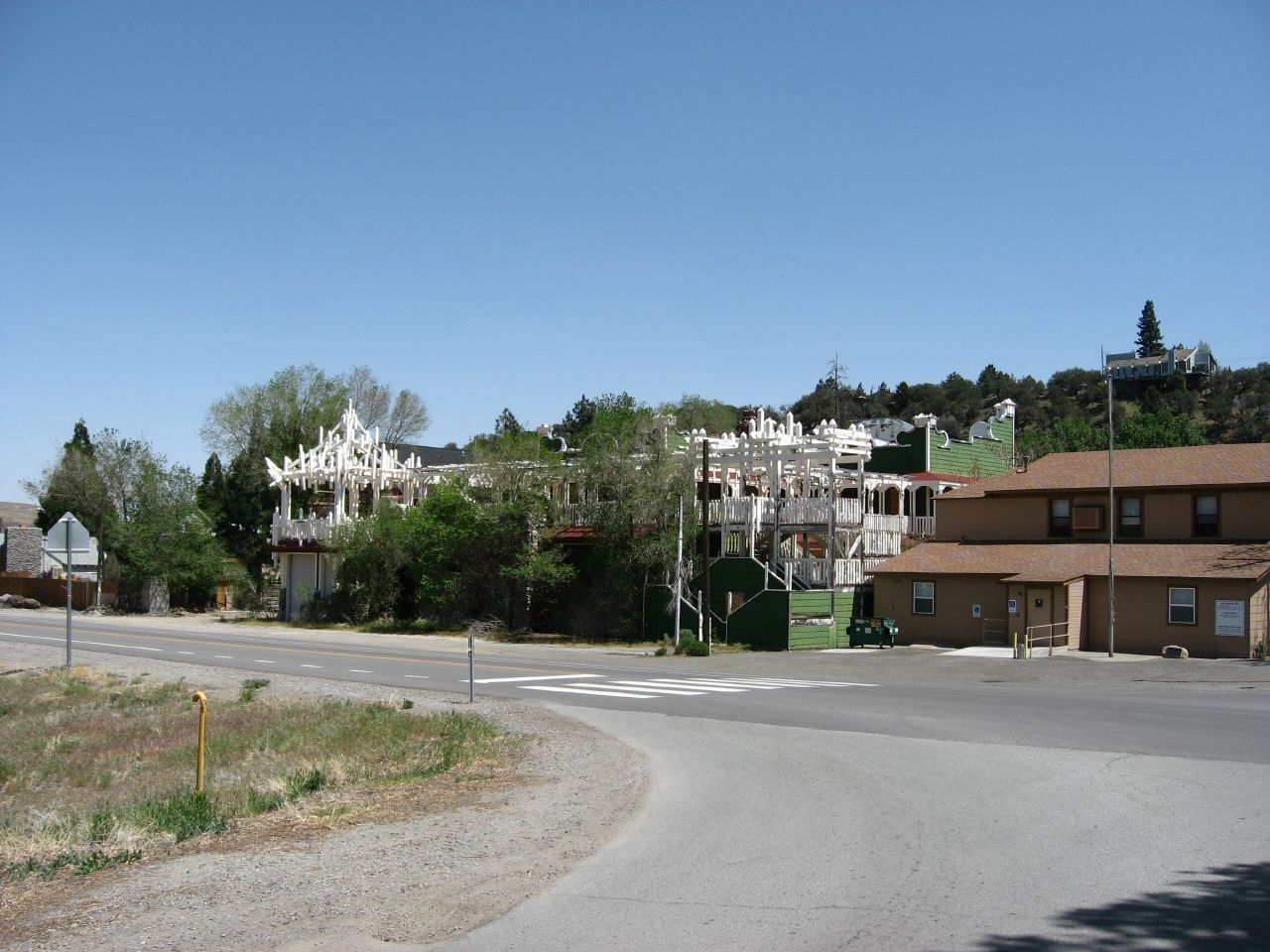

- Location of Verdi, Nevada
- Coordinates: 39°31′6″N 119°59′19″W
- Country: United States
- State: Nevada
- County: Washoe

Area
  - Total: 3.43 sq mi (8.89 km^{2})
  - Land: 3.31 sq mi (8.58 km^{2})
  - Water: 0.12 sq mi (0.30 km^{2})
- Elevation: 4,899 ft (1,493 m)

Population (2020)
  - Total: 1,396
  - Density: 421.2/sq mi (162.63/km^{2})
- Time zone: UTC-8 (Pacific (PST))
  - Summer (DST): UTC-7 (PDT)
- ZIP Code: 89439
- FIPS code: 32-79400
- GNIS feature ID: 0861844

Nevada Historical Marker
- Reference no.: 191

Verdi (/ˈvɜːrdaɪ/ VUR-dye) is a census-designated place (CDP) in Washoe County, Nevada, United States. It is on the western side of the Reno metropolitan area near Interstate 80 and stretches eastward towards its neighborhood-exclave of Lawton, Nevada, surrounded by Reno, Nevada, west of Mae Anne Avenue. The CDP of Verdi, California, lies immediately adjacent across the state line. Both are in the shadow of California's Verdi Range. As of the 2020 census, Verdi had a population of 1,396. Prior to 2010, the community was listed by the U.S. Census Bureau as part of the Verdi-Mogul CDP.

== History ==
It was originally known as O'Neil's Crossing, named for the man who built a bridge there in 1860.

=== Name ===
The town of Verdi was named after Giuseppe Verdi by Charles Crocker, founder of the Central Pacific Railroad, when he pulled a slip of paper from a hat and read the name of the Italian opera composer in 1868. The name is pronounced by the local population as VUR-dye.

=== 1870 train robbery ===
On November 4, 1870, five men robbed a train travelling from San Francisco to Virginia City near Verdi after blocking the track. The train was carrying approximately $60,000 of gold and silver, and the robbers were able to get away with approximately $41,000. The same train was robbed for a second time near Pequop, Nevada, in Elko County.

== Geography ==
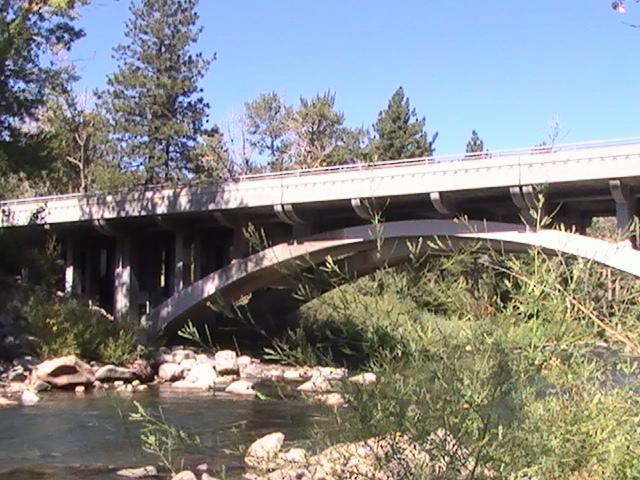
Third Street in Verdi, which becomes Fourth Street in Reno, (Old U.S. Highway 40) passes over the Truckee River, as seen from Crystal Peak Park.

Verdi is located at 39°31′6″N 119°59′19″W on the western border of Nevada, adjacent to the California state line.

The CDP has a total area of 3.5 square miles (9.0 km^{2}), of which 3.4 square miles (8.7 km^{2}) is land and 0.12 square miles (0.3 km^{2}), or 3.35%, is water.

=== 2008 earthquake swarm ===
In February 2008 an earthquake swarm began, which ended in June 2008. The total number of earthquakes in the census-designated place reached over 5,000 and ranged in magnitude from 0.7 to 4.7 on the Richter magnitude scale.

== Demographics ==
Historical population
Census	Pop.	Note	%±
2020	1,396		—
U.S. Decennial Census

As of the 2010 United States census, there were 1,415 people in the CDP. The population density was 416.2 inhabitants per square mile (160.7/km^{2}). There were 686 housing units at an average density of 201.8 per square mile (77.9/km^{2}). The racial makeup of the CDP was 95.5% White, 0.2% African American, 0.4% Native American, 0.9% Asian, 0.8% Native Hawaiian or Other Pacific Islander, 0.5% some other race, and 1.6% from two or more races. Hispanic or Latino of any race were 4.6% of the population.

There were 641 households, out of which 20.3% had children under the age of 18 living with them, 57.9% were headed by married couples living together, 4.4% had a female householder with no husband present, and 34.2% were non-families. 26.4% of all households were made up of individuals, and 10.3% were someone living alone who was 65 years of age or older. The average household size was 2.21, and the average family size was 2.66.

In the CDP, the population was spread out, with 14.4% under the age of 18, 6.6% from 18 to 24, 17.3% from 25 to 44, 41.6% from 45 to 64, and 19.9% who were 65 years of age or older. The median age was 52.2 years. For every 100 females, there were 106.3 males. For every 100 females age 18 and over, there were 106.3 males.

For the period 2007–2011, the estimated median annual income for a household in the CDP was $79,324, and the median income for a family was $96,518. Male full-time workers had a median income of $51,464 versus $77,000 for females. The per capita income for the CDP was $87,680. About 3.3% of families and 4.0% of the population were below the poverty threshold, including 24.0% of those under age 18 and 0% of those age 65 or over.

== Education ==
The Verdi area is served by the Washoe County School District.

== Economy ==
Verdi is home to two of the Nevada casinos and RV parks closest to California on I-80: Terrible's Gold Ranch Casino, now known simply as Gold Ranch Casino, at Exit 2 and the Boomtown Reno at Exit 4. Nearby is the Cabela's sporting goods store closest to California.
