= Moor, Nevada =

- Ghost town
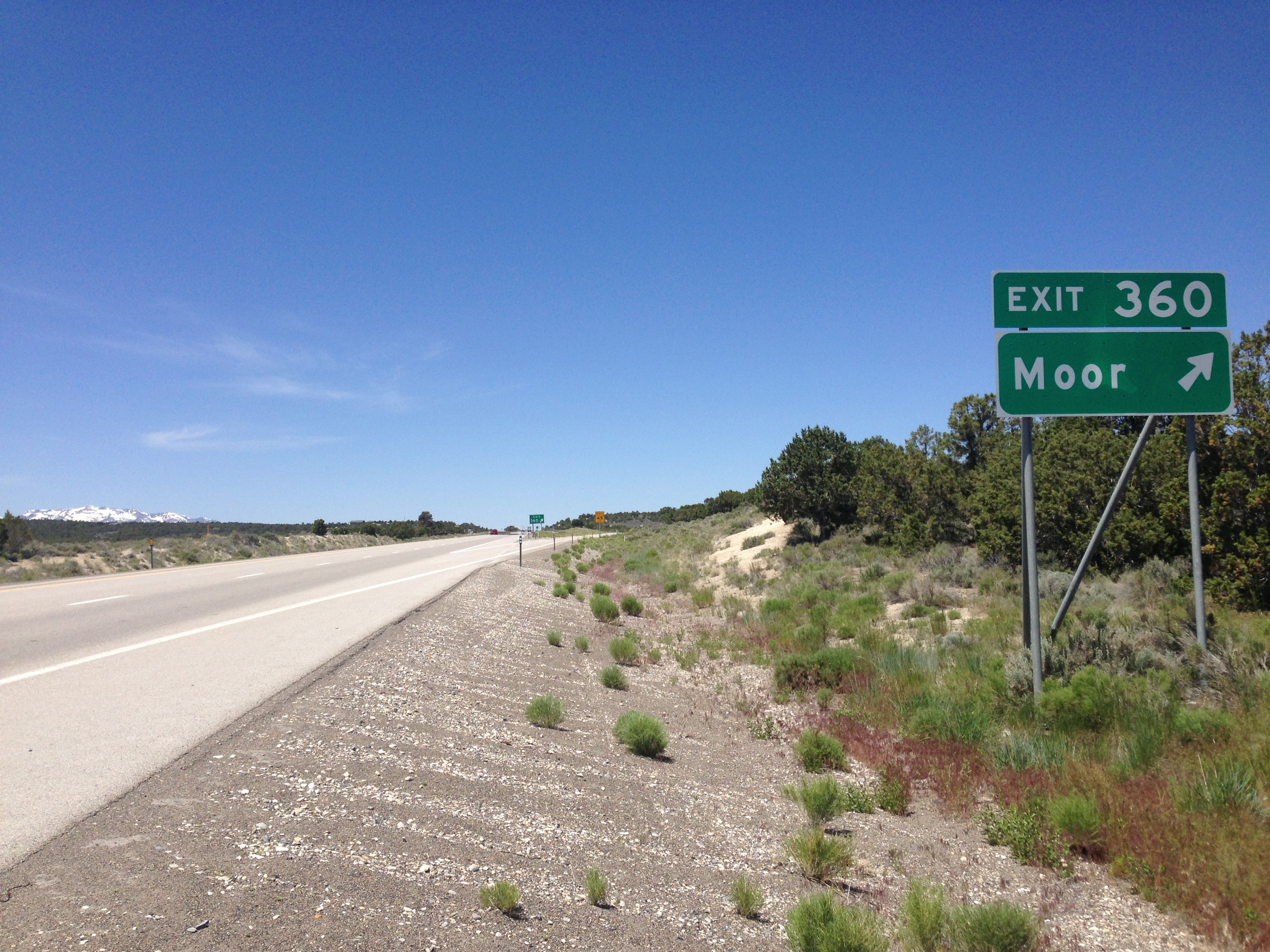
- Moor exit on Interstate 80

- Location in the state of Nevada Moor, Nevada (the United States)
- Coordinates: 41°07′02″N 114°48′54″W
- Country: United States
- State: Nevada
- County: Elko
- Elevation: 6,158 ft (1,877 m)
- Time zone: UTC-8 (PST)
  - Summer (DST): UTC-7 (PDT)

Moor is a ghost town in Ceder Pass in Elko County, Nevada, United States. It is located along Interstate 80 between Wells and West Wendover.

== History ==
The first settlement at Moor was made in 1869. Variant names were "Moor Siding", "Moores", and "Moors". The community was named after a railroad employee. In 1941, Moor had 17 inhabitants. Other than some remnants of building foundations and aged debris, little remains of the town today.
