= Rye Patch Reservoir =

Rye Patch Dam
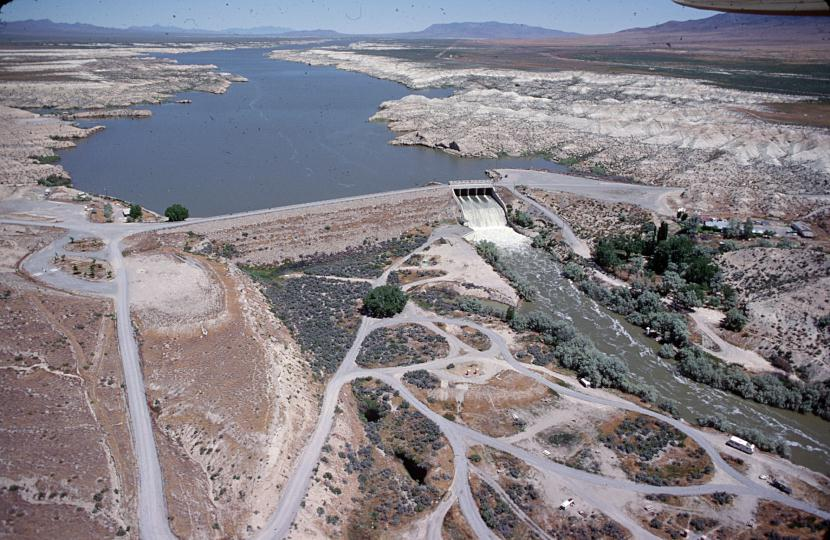

- Location of Rye Patch Dam in Nevada
- Location: Pershing County, Nevada
- Coordinates: 40°41′53″N 118°17′15″W
- Purpose: Irrigation
- Status: In use
- Opening date: 1936
- Operator: Pershing County Water Conservation District

Dam and spillways
- Type of dam: Earth-fill
- Impounds: Humboldt River
- Height: 78 ft (24 m)
- Length: 1,074 ft (327 m)

Reservoir
- Creates: Rye Patch Reservoir
- Total capacity: 213,000 acre⋅ft (263,000,000 m^{3})
- Surface area: 11,970 acres (48.4 km^{2})
- Normal elevation: 4,136 ft (1,261 m)

The Rye Patch Reservoir is a reservoir on the Humboldt River in the U.S. state of Nevada. It is located about 22 miles (35 km) northeast of the town of Lovelock, and is managed by the Pershing County Water Conservation District. The reservoir stores water for the agricultural area surrounding Lovelock, which is at the far downstream reach of the Humboldt, near the Humboldt Sink. Since the Lovelock area receives a mere 5.76 inches (146 mm) of rain annually, agriculture requires irrigation, but the high variability of the Humboldt (which often runs completely dry) means that water storage is necessary for irrigation to be feasible.

== Rye Patch Settlement ==
The settlement of Rye Patch got its start in the early 1860s, and at one time included a school and boarding house. Rye Patch was named for the wild dry grass that grew in the area. In 1869, the Central Pacific Railroad came to the region and the Rye Patch station opened. The stamp mill at Rye Patch processed ore from the mines at Star City, Unionville and Rochester until the late 1870s. The Rye Patch Post Office was in operation from June 1872 until November 1916.

== Rye Patch Dam ==
In 1933, the Bureau of Reclamation decided to build the Rye Patch Dam to impound the Humboldt and create the reservoir. The dam was built between 1935 and 1936 to the west of Rye Patch station. A New Deal project intended to help fight the Great Depression, the dam was funded by the Public Works Administration and employed workers from the Civilian Conservation Corps. The dam was expanded in 1975–1976, raising the dam three feet (1 m) to provide the reservoir with more storage capacity.

Rye Patch Reservoir also includes the Pitt–Taylor Reservoirs, two off-stream storage basins that predate Rye Patch. They were built in 1913 by Humboldt–Lovelock Irrigation, Light and Power Company, a private venture run by William C. Pitt, an upper Lovelock Valley rancher, and John G. Taylor, an upper valley farmer and sheep rancher. These reservoirs are less efficient than Rye Patch, losing much water to evaporation, so they are used only for additional capacity in high-flow years.

The reservoir has experienced sedimentation, a problem common to reservoirs in which sediment settles out of the river flow and decreases the capacity of the reservoir. A 1972 study estimated that the reservoir had lost 10% of its capacity to sedimentation since construction.

The reservoir has come under criticism, particularly from upstream users who accuse Lovelock farmers of attempting to monopolize the waters of the Humboldt for their own use. For instance, when the reservoir was nearly drained in 1992 to provide water to the farms, anglers at the Rye Patch State Recreation Area complained of a massive fish kill. The project has also been criticized for single-minded focus on irrigation and skewed cost-benefit ratios. Furthermore, a study by the Nevada State Museum in 1987 concluded that construction of the Rye Patch and Pitt–Taylor Reservoirs flooded archaeological and paleontological sites that showed evidence of prehistoric human habitation.

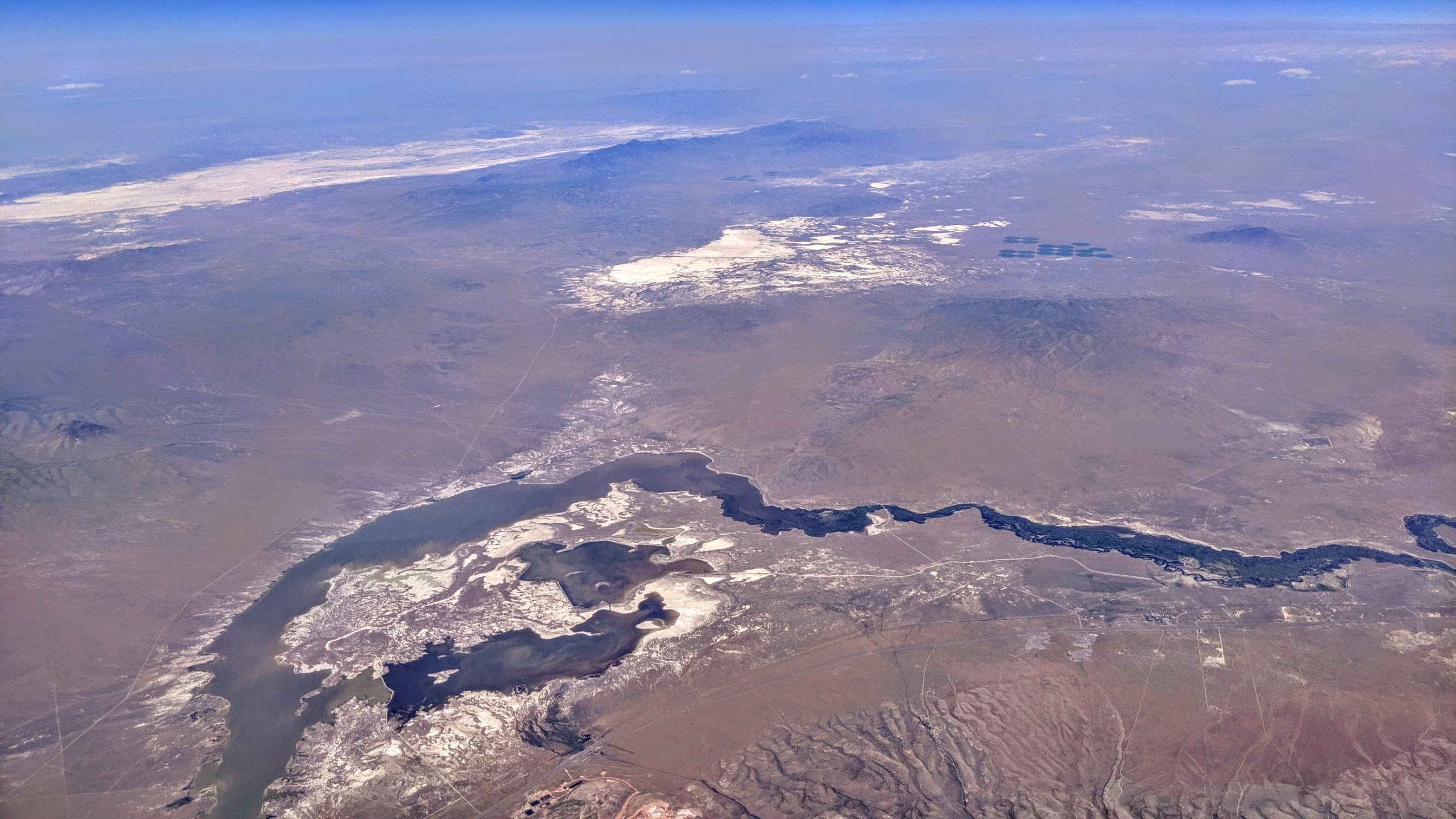
Aerial view of Rye Patch and Pitt–Taylor reservoirs and Lassens Meadows on the Humboldt River. The reservoirs are filled after the wet winter and spring of 2019.

== Climate ==
Climate data for Rye Patch Dam (1991–2020 normals, extremes 1935–present)
Month	Jan	Feb	Mar	Apr	May	Jun	Jul	Aug	Sep	Oct	Nov	Dec	Year
Record high °F (°C)	68 (20)	75 (24)	83 (28)	92 (33)	101 (38)	109 (43)	111 (44)	108 (42)	107 (42)	94 (34)	79 (26)	68 (20)	111 (44)
Mean daily maximum °F (°C)	43.2 (6.2)	49.6 (9.8)	58.8 (14.9)	64.7 (18.2)	74.4 (23.6)	85.0 (29.4)	95.4 (35.2)	92.8 (33.8)	83.7 (28.7)	69.4 (20.8)	54.1 (12.3)	42.6 (5.9)	67.8 (19.9)
Daily mean °F (°C)	31.7 (−0.2)	36.6 (2.6)	43.4 (6.3)	48.4 (9.1)	57.3 (14.1)	66.2 (19.0)	74.6 (23.7)	71.7 (22.1)	62.9 (17.2)	50.5 (10.3)	39.2 (4.0)	30.4 (−0.9)	51.1 (10.6)
Mean daily minimum °F (°C)	20.1 (−6.6)	23.6 (−4.7)	28.1 (−2.2)	32.1 (0.1)	40.2 (4.6)	47.3 (8.5)	53.7 (12.1)	50.5 (10.3)	42.1 (5.6)	31.5 (−0.3)	24.2 (−4.3)	18.3 (−7.6)	34.3 (1.3)
Record low °F (°C)	−29 (−34)	−21 (−29)	−10 (−23)	6 (−14)	12 (−11)	25 (−4)	30 (−1)	30 (−1)	17 (−8)	4 (−16)	−10 (−23)	−24 (−31)	−29 (−34)
Average precipitation inches (mm)	1.00 (25)	0.73 (19)	0.84 (21)	0.87 (22)	1.20 (30)	0.70 (18)	0.21 (5.3)	0.29 (7.4)	0.30 (7.6)	0.63 (16)	0.69 (18)	0.86 (22)	8.32 (211)
Average snowfall inches (cm)	0.8 (2.0)	0.2 (0.51)	0.1 (0.25)	0.3 (0.76)	0.0 (0.0)	0.0 (0.0)	0.0 (0.0)	0.0 (0.0)	0.0 (0.0)	0.0 (0.0)	0.3 (0.76)	1.6 (4.1)	3.3 (8.4)
Average precipitation days (≥ 0.01 in)	5.6	5.3	6.1	5.8	6.3	2.9	1.6	1.5	2.3	3.2	4.7	5.3	50.6
Average snowy days (≥ 0.1 in)	1.0	0.3	0.1	0.1	0.0	0.0	0.0	0.0	0.0	0.0	0.4	1.0	2.9
Source: NOAA
