= Battle Mountain =

Battle Mountain or Battle Mountains may refer to:

- Battle Mountain (British Columbia), a mountain
- Battle Mountain, Nevada, an unincorporated community and census-designated place
  - Battle Mountain Airport, Nevada
  - Battle Mountain High School (Nevada)
- Battle Mountains, Nevada, a mountain range
- Battle Mountain, Queensland, the site of a battle in the Kalkadoon Wars
- Battle Mountain, Virginia, a mountain
- Battle Mountain Forest State Scenic Corridor, a state park in Oregon
- Battle Mountain Formation, a geological formation in Colorado
- Battle Mountain High School (Colorado)
- North Battle Mountain, Nevada, an unincorporated community

== See also ==
- Battle of Battle Mountain, a 1950 engagement between United Nations and North Korean forces during the Korean War
- Downtown Battle Mountain, a 2007 album by Dance Gavin Dance
- Downtown Battle Mountain II, a 2011 album by Dance Gavin Dance
- Battlement Mountain (disambiguation)
