= Argenta, Nevada =

Ghost town in Lander County, Nevada, United States

- Ghost town
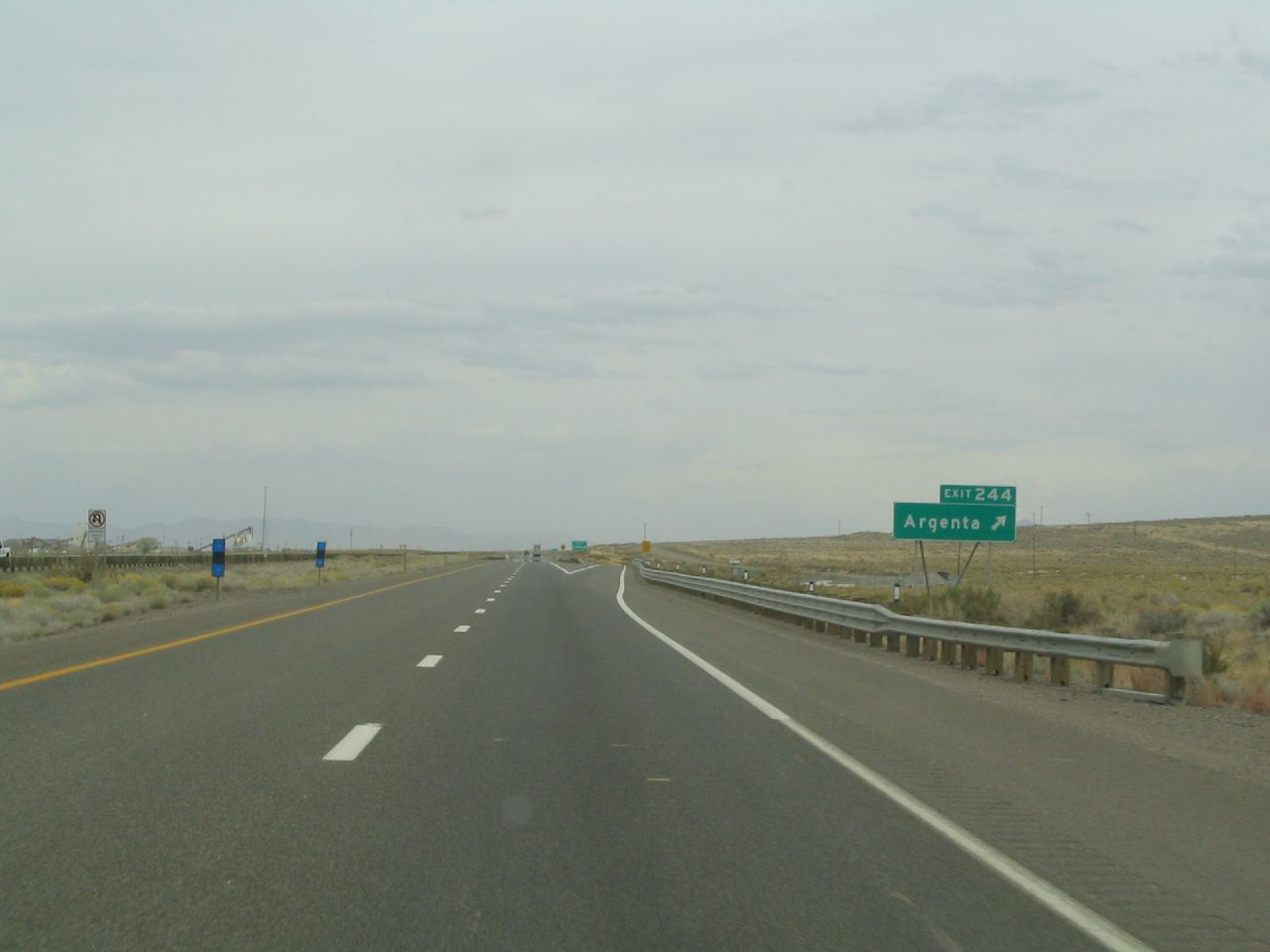

- Location within Nevada Location within the United States
- Coordinates: 40°40′28″N 116°42′20″W
- Country: United States
- State: Nevada
- County: Lander
- Elevation: 4,600 ft (1,400 m)

Population (2010)
  - Total: 0
- Time zone: UTC-8 (Pacific (PST))
  - Summer (DST): UTC-7 (PDT)

Argenta is a ghost town in Lander County, Nevada, in the United States.

== History ==
Silver was found in Argenta in 1866, a small camp was built and a little town established. Argenta's post office opened in December 1868. Argenta became in a shipping point for Austin, Nevada, and its residents had the hope that Austin would help make Argenta the railroad center of the Lander County. Unhappily, the center of attentions in Austin was Battle Mountain, Nevada, which was closer to the city and nearer Galena. People of Argenta understood that the future of the town was bedeviled. In December 1870, they moved everything and themselves to Battle Mountain, and Argenta became a ghost town. The name of the post office was changed from Argenta to Battle Mountain on February 24, 1874. There was no activity in Argenta until 1930 when barite was discovered in Argenta Mountain. From 1930 and 1969 over $3 million in barite was produced. The mine was active until 2015, when it was closed by its owner Baker Hughes.

== See also ==
- List of ghost towns in Nevada
