= Nevada State Route 304 =

Highway in Nevada

State Route 304
- Interstate 80 Business, Front Street
- SR 304 / I-80 Bus. highlighted in red

Route information
- Maintained by NDOT
- Length: 3.788 mi (6.096 km)
- Existed: July 1, 1976–present

Major junctions
- West end: I-80 northwest of Battle Mountain
- SR 305 in Battle Mountain; SR 806 in Battle Mountain
- East end: I-80 southeast of Battle Mountain

Location
- Country: United States
- State: Nevada
- County: Lander

Highway system
- Interstate Highway System; Main; Auxiliary; Suffixed; Business; Future; Nevada State Highway System; Interstate; US; State; Pre‑1976; Scenic
← SR 294	→ SR 305

State Route 304 (SR 304) is a state highway in Lander County, Nevada, United States. The road is the main street through the town of Battle Mountain, and is also designated Interstate 80 Business (I-80 Bus.). The highway was part of SR 1 and U.S. Route 40 (US 40) prior to the mid-1970s.

== Route description ==
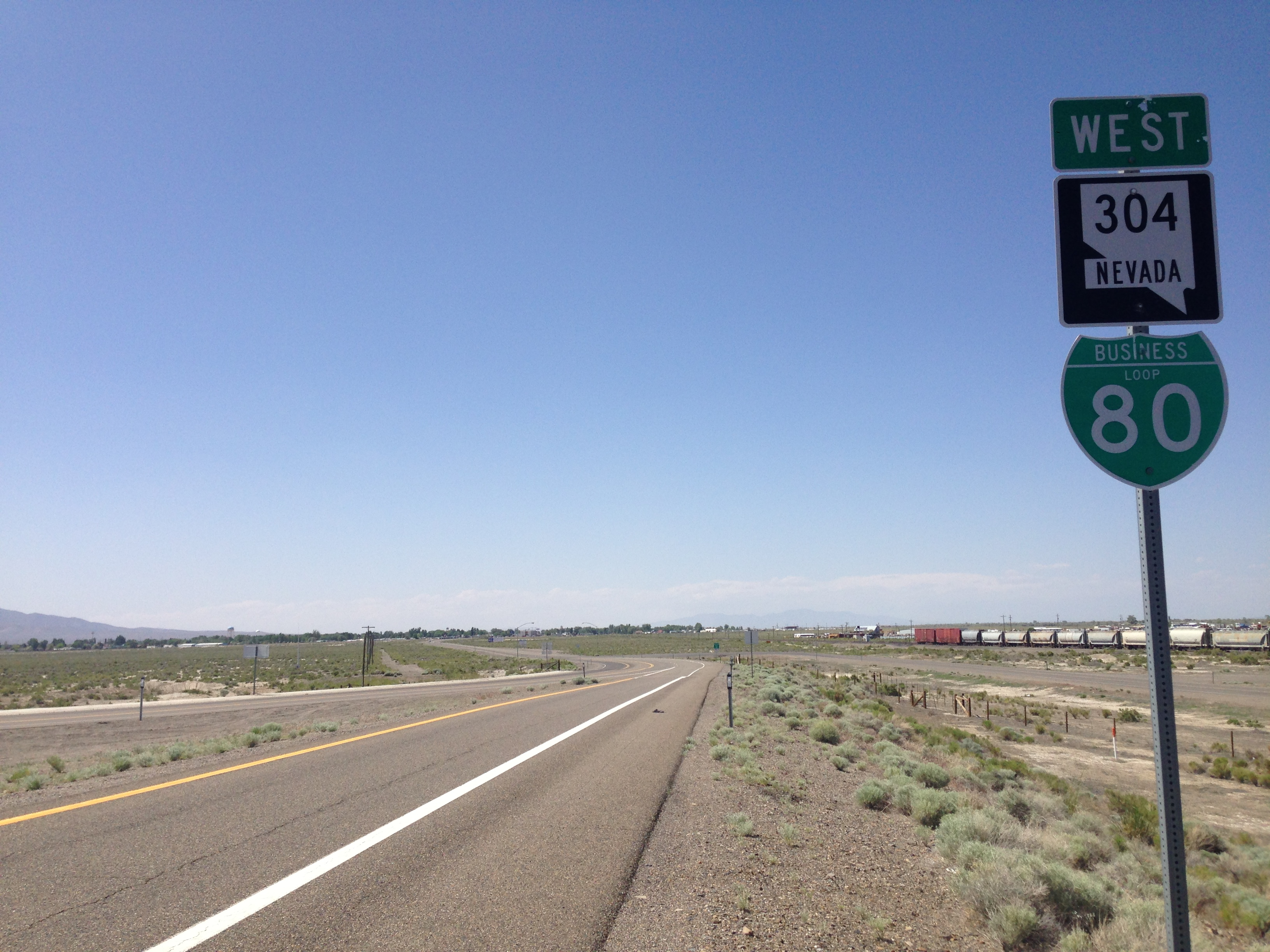
View west from the east end of SR 304, May 2014

SR 304 begins just west of the Interstate 80 (I-80) West Battle Mountain interchange northwest of Battle Mountain. The route heads briefly passes through a portion of the Te-Moak Tribe Indian reservation as it turns southeast into the town. The highway parallels the Union Pacific Railroad right through the middle of the Battle Mountain business district. SR 304 has a junction with State Route 305, which connects to Austin in southern Lander County, as well as State Route 806, providing access to mining districts north of the town. The route exits the town limits, crossing over the Reese River before turning south to reconnect to I-80 at the East Battle Mountain interchange and terminating just south of there.

The majority of State Route 304 is also designated Interstate 80 Business, a business loop of Interstate 80.

== History ==
SR 304 was part of State Route 1 and US 40 from the 1920s through the 1970s.

Front Street in Battle Mountain was formerly part of State Route 1, a route designated with the creation of the Nevada State Highway System in 1917. The adoption of the U.S. Highway System in 1926 by the Bureau of Public Roads created US 40 in Nevada, which was also routed along Front Street through Battle Mountain. Both SR 1 and US 40 were shown on Nevada state maps as early as 1929.

The State Route 304 designation was applied to Front Street through Battle Mountain on July 1, 1976, in the renumbering of Nevada's state highways. In this process, Route 1 was removed from the state highway system. US 40 was also gone in Nevada, having mostly been replaced by the freeway that would become I-80.

== Major intersections ==
The entire route is in Lander County.

Location	mi	km	Destinations	Notes
	0.00	0.00	I-80 – Winnemucca, Elko I-80 BL begins	Interchange; western terminus; I-80 exit 229; road continues as Allen Road
Battle Mountain			South Humboldt Street	Serves Battle Mountain General Hospital
Battle Mountain			SR 305 south (South Broad Street) – Austin	Northern terminus of SR 305
Battle Mountain			SR 806 north (North Reese Street) / South Reese Street – North Battle Mountain	Southern terminus of SR 806
	3.788	6.096	I-80 – Winnemucca, Elko I-80 BL ends	Interchange; eastern terminus; I-80 exit 233; road continues as Hill Top Road
1.000 mi = 1.609 km; 1.000 km = 0.621 mi

== See also ==
- List of state routes in Nevada
- List of highways numbered 304
