= Galena, Nevada =

Galena, Nevada is the name of two former communities:

- Galena, Lander County, Nevada, a ghost town
- Galena, Washoe County, Nevada, an abandoned town
