= Battle Mountains, Nevada =

Mountain range in Nevada, United States

- Location within Nevada

Highest point
- Peak: North Peak, Humboldt County
- Elevation: 2,606 m (8,550 ft)
- Coordinates: 40°40′30″N 117°07′57″W

Dimensions
- Length: 24 km (15 mi) N-S
- Width: 22 km (14 mi) E-W
- Area: 337 km^{2} (130 mi^{2})

Geography
- Country: United States
- State: Nevada
- Range coordinates: 40°37′2″N 117°7′12″W --
- Borders on: Fish Creek Range SW and Shoshone Range SE
- Topo map(s): USGS Antler Peak, Galena Canyon, North Peak, and Snow Gulch, Nevada 7.5 Minute Quads

The Battle Mountains or Battle Mountain Range is a mountain range in western Lander and southeastern Humboldt counties of Nevada. The communities of Battle Mountain and Valmy lie just to the east and north respectively along Interstate 80 in the Humboldt River valley. Nevada State Route 305 runs along the southeast side of the range from Battle Mountain toward Austin to the south.

The range is roughly circular in shape and exhibits radial drainage. The Humboldt River Valley lies to the northeast with the Sheep Creek Range beyond. To the northwest and west is Buffalo Valley with Buffalo Mountain and the Tobin Range beyond. The Fish Creek Range lies to the southwest and the Reese River Valley and Shoshone Range to the southeast.

== Peaks ==
Named peaks include:

Peak	Peak elevation	Coordinates
North Peak	8,550 ft (2,610 m)	40° 40′ 31″ N 117° 08′ 00″ W
Antler Peak	8,236 ft (2,510 m)	40° 35′ 57″ N 117° 08′ 03″ W
Long Peak	7,870 ft (2,400 m)	40° 37′ 08″ N 117° 06′ 08″ W
Chessor Mountain	6,018 ft (1,834 m)	40° 31′ 59″ N 117° 06′ 09″ W
Elephant Head	5,930 ft (1,810 m)	40° 36′ 42″ N 117° 01′ 09″ W

== Mining in the Battle Mountains ==
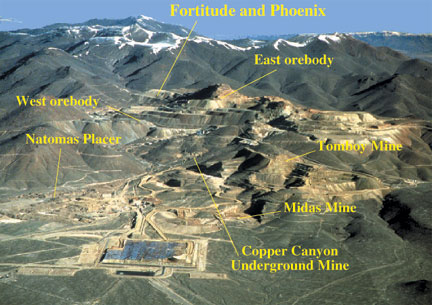
Mines of the Copper Canyon area

The range has a long history of mining following the original discovery in 1866. The earliest mining was around the old mining camp of Copper Basin in Long Canyon which lies 5.4 miles (8.7 km) west of the current town of Battle Mountain. The Copper Basin area was the original location of the Battle Mountain mining camp which later moved to the current location on the Humboldt as a mining support town. To the southwest about 4.2 miles (6.8 km) in Galena Canyon, the mining camps of Bannock, Copper Canyon and Galena were later developed with the Bannock camp established in 1909. The area produced copper, gold, silver, antimony, lead, zinc, tungsten, molybdenum, arsenic, turquoise, and nickel. The Marigold Gold mine is located in the north end of the range.
