= Nevada State Route 806 =

Highway in Nevada

State Route 806
- North Reese Road
- SR 806 highlighted in red

Route information
- Maintained by NDOT
- Length: 5.812 mi (9.354 km)
- Existed: 1976–present

Major junctions
- South end: I-80 BL / SR 304 in Battle Mountain
- North end: North Battle Mountain

Location
- Country: United States
- State: Nevada
- County: Lander

Highway system
- Nevada State Highway System; Interstate; US; State; Pre‑1976; Scenic
← SR 796	→ SR 823

State Route 806 (SR 806) is a short state highway in Lander County, Nevada connecting the town of Battle Mountain to North Battle Mountain. Prior to 1976, the route was part of a longer State Route 18A.

== Route description ==
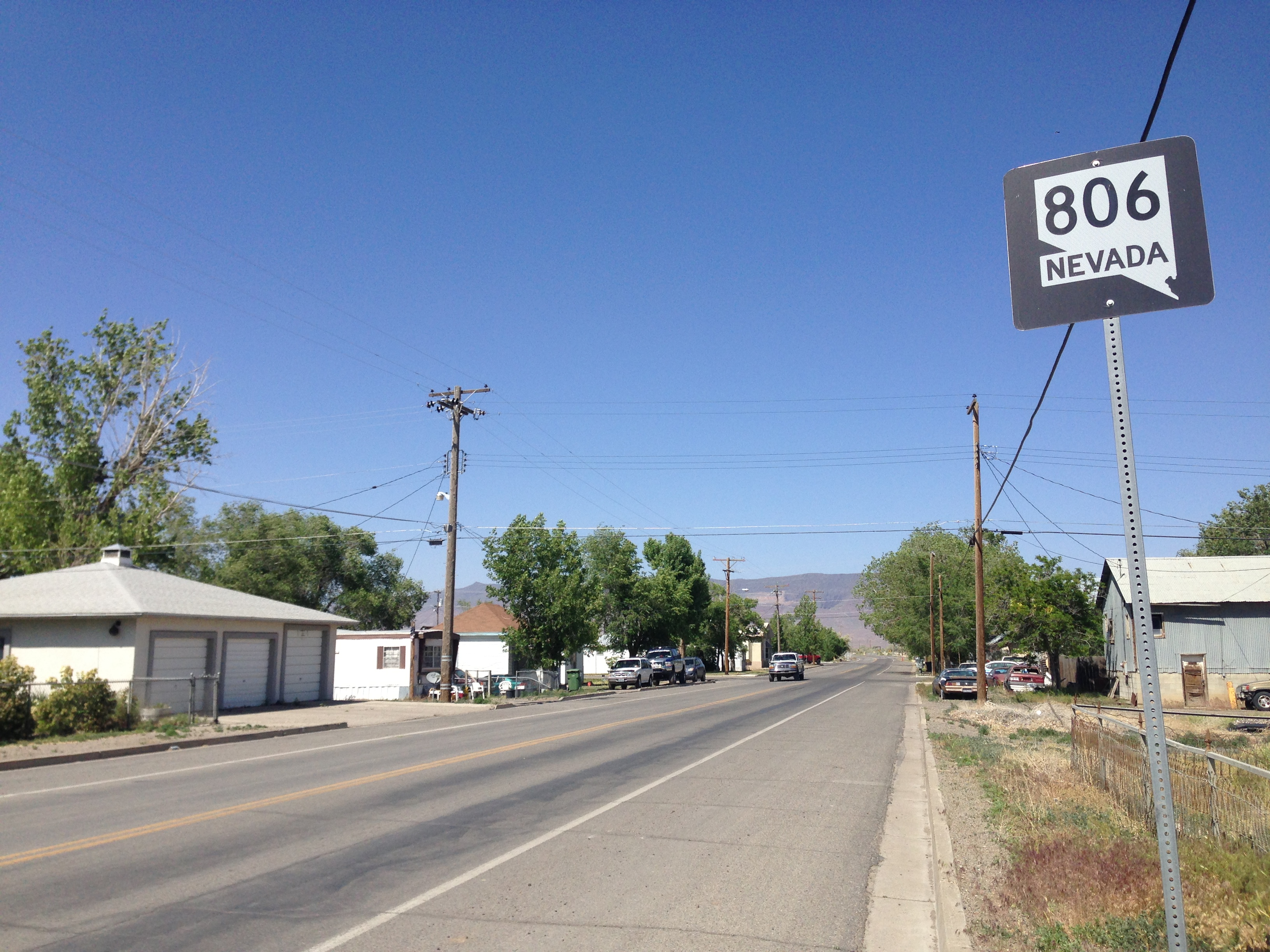
View north along SR 806 in Battle Mountain, Nevada

State Route 806 begins at the intersection of Front Street (Interstate 80 Business/SR 304) and Reese Street in the business district of Battle Mountain. From there, the route follows Reese Street northeast over the Union Pacific Railroad tracks towards the town's rodeo grounds. SR 806 then turns more northerly, crossing over the Reese River as it leaves the town limits. The route also bridges the Humboldt River as it heads northward towards the tip of the Sheep Creek Range. SR 806 comes to an end at a cattle guard just south of a branch of the Union Pacific railroad at North Battle Mountain.

== History ==
SR 806 was previously part of State Route 18A

SR 806 was originally part of former State Route 18A. That route, established by 1950, followed the present-day highway up to the railroad station at North Battle Mountain, then turned northwest paralleling the Western Pacific (now Union Pacific) railroad line and crossing into Humboldt County to end at a junction with State Route 18 just south of Getchell Mine. The route was about 41 miles (66 km) long, with most of that distance being unimproved surface. Most of the highway remained unimproved for several years, but the southernmost miles between Battle Mountain and the northern railroad crossing had been paved by 1963.

No major changes to State Route 18A were seen during its existence. The route lasted until the 1970s, when the highway disappeared from Nevada's state highway map on the 1973 edition. However, the south end of the route became State Route 806 in the renumbering of Nevada's state highways system that began on July 1, 1976.

== Major intersections ==
The entire route is in Lander County.

Location	mi	km	Destinations	Notes
Battle Mountain	0.00	0.00	I-80 BL / SR 304 (Front Street) – I-80	Southern terminus
North Battle Mountain	5.81	9.35	Reese Road	Northern terminus; continuation beyond terminus
1.000 mi = 1.609 km; 1.000 km = 0.621 mi
