= List of highways numbered 305 =

The following highways are numbered 305:

== Canada ==
- Manitoba Provincial Road 305
- New Brunswick Route 305
- Nova Scotia Route 305
- Prince Edward Island Route 305
- Saskatchewan Highway 305

== China ==
- China National Highway 305

== India ==
National Highway 305

== Japan ==
- Japan National Route 305

== Philippines ==
- N305 highway (Philippines)

== United States ==
- Interstates
  - Interstate 305 (multiple unsigned routes)
  - Interstate 305 (cancelled proposal)
- Arkansas Highway 305
- Connecticut Route 305
- Florida State Road 305 (former)
- Georgia State Route 305
- Hawaii Route 305
- Iowa Highway 305 (former)
- Kentucky Route 305
- Maryland Route 305
- Mississippi Highway 305
- Montana Secondary Highway 305
- Nevada State Route 305
- New Mexico State Road 305
- New York State Route 305
  - New York State Route 305 (former)
- North Carolina Highway 305
- Ohio State Route 305
- Pennsylvania Route 305
- Tennessee State Route 305
- Texas:
  - Texas State Highway 305
  - Texas State Highway Loop 305
  - Farm to Market Road 305
- Utah State Route 305 (former)
- Virginia State Route 305
- Washington State Route 305
- West Virginia Route 305

Other areas:

- Puerto Rico Highway 305
- U.S. Virgin Islands Highway 305

Preceded by 304	Lists of highways 305	Succeeded by 306
