= Telluride, Nevada =

- Ghost town
- Location within Nevada Location within the United States
- Coordinates: 40°33′39″N 117°11′12″W
- Country: United States
- State: Nevada
- County: Lander
- Elevation: 5,745 ft (1,751 m)
- Time zone: UTC-8 (Pacific (PST))
  - Summer (DST): UTC-7 (PDT)

Telluride is a ghost town in Lander County, state of Nevada in the United States.

== History ==
In 1875 or 1876, the Battle Mountain Mining Company built a 30-ton concentrator nearby at the mouth of Willow Creek to serve the mines of Copper Canyon. The concentrator closed in 1876.

In 1910, J. Hutchins found the Dollar Mine, located in an altitude of 7,500 feet (2,300 m). Due to heavy snows, the find was not made public until the spring of 1911. The camp was named in 1911. Although at the site there were the stores of several business and a saloon, the problem was the difficulty of access prevented further development for Telluride. The mine was closed in 1912 and people had abandoned the site. There were recent mining activity in the area and the only remains of the old site are scant ruins.
