= Jacobsville, Nevada =

- Ghost town
- Location within Nevada Location within the United States
- Coordinates: 39°30′04″N 117°10′52″W
- Country: United States
- State: Nevada
- County: Lander
- Named for: George Washington Jacob, an agent for the Overland Mail Company
- Elevation: 5,699 ft (1,737 m)

Jacobsville is a ghost town located in Lander County, Nevada, six miles west of Austin, on the east bank of Reese River, 0.7 mi N of US 50. Jacobsville was also known as Jacobs Spring, Jacobsville Station, Reese River and Reese River Station.

== Mail station ==
The station possibly began as a mail station operated by George Chorpenning's 1859 mail posts near the Reese River. The station was burned by Indians in 1860 and partially completed adobe structure was present on October 13 of that year when it was visited by Richard Francis Burton.

== Pony Express station ==
Reese River Station was a Pony Express station during the 18 months of its operation (April 3, 1860, to October 1861).

The ruins of the adobe Pony Express station were present northwest of Jacobsville in the early 1980s.

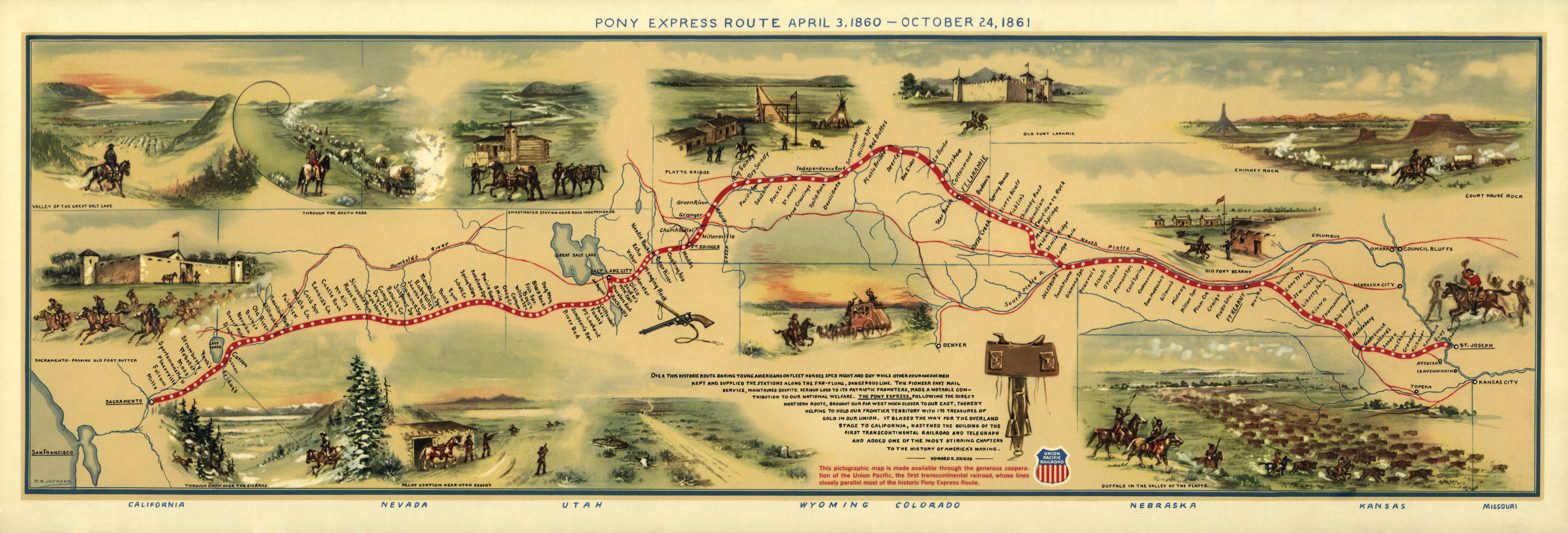
Illustrated Map of Pony Express Route in 1860 by William Henry Jackson The Pony Express mail route, April 3, 1860 – October 24, 1861 showing Reese River Station. Reproduction of Jackson illustration issued to commemorate the 100th anniversary of Pony Express founding on April 3, 1960. Reproduction of Jackson's map issued by the Union Pacific Railroad Company.

== Later history ==
In 1861, Mark Twain traveled through the area and in "Roughing It" he wrote, "On the eighteenth day we encountered the eastward-bound telegraph-constructors at Reese River station and sent a message to his Excellency Gov. Nye at Carson City (distant one hundred and fifty-six miles)."

On May 2, 1862, a former Pony Express rider named William M. Talcott discovered rich silver ore in Pony Canyon while cutting wood for Jacobs Station on the old Pony Express route and a maintenance point on the overland telegraph line. The result was a silver rush known as the Reese River excitement.

Jacobsville was the provisional Lander County seat from December 1862 to September 1863. A courthouse was built in Jacobsville, completed in August 1863, and moved to Austin in September.

Myron Angel wrote that "[In 1863, Jacobsville] had a population of three or four hundred; also contained two hotels, three stores, post-office, telegraph office, Court House and fifty residences."

The Jacobsville post office was in operation from March 1863 to April 1864.

By the late 1870s or early 1880s there was only a single farm house at the site.
