= Battle Mountain Airport =

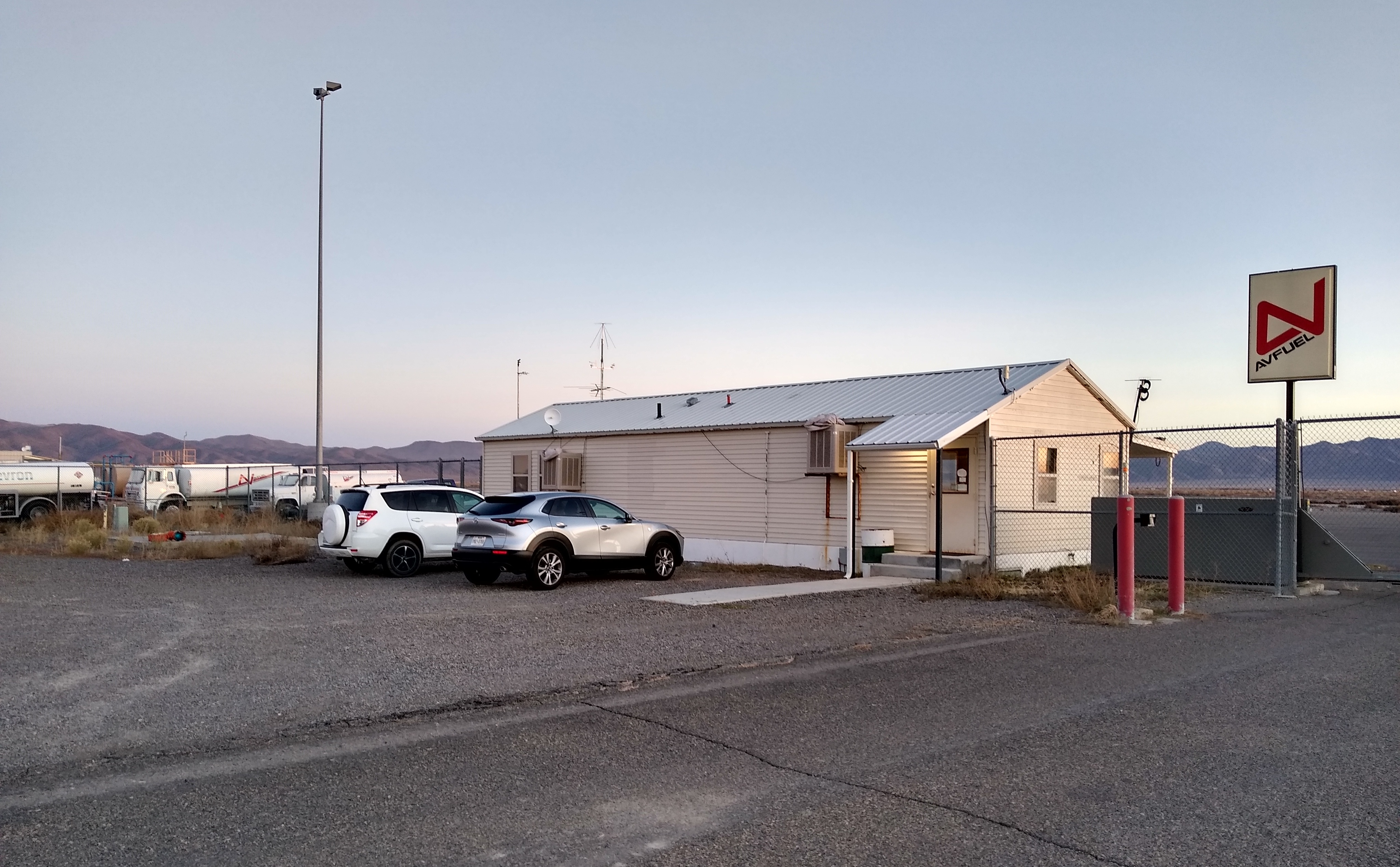
- IATA: BAM; ICAO: KBAM; FAA LID: BAM

Summary
- Airport type: Public
- Operator: Lander County
- Serves: Battle Mountain, Nevada
- Location: Lander County, near Battle Mountain, Nevada
- Elevation AMSL: 4,532 ft (1,381 m)
- Coordinates: 40°35′59″N 116°52′34″W
- Interactive map of Battle Mountain Airport

Runways
Direction	Length		Surface
Direction	ft	m	Surface
12/30	7,300	2,225	Asphalt
3/21	7,299	2,225	Asphalt

Helipads
Number	Length		Surface
Number	ft	m	Surface
H1	60	18	Concrete
H2	60	18	Concrete
- Source: Federal Aviation Administration

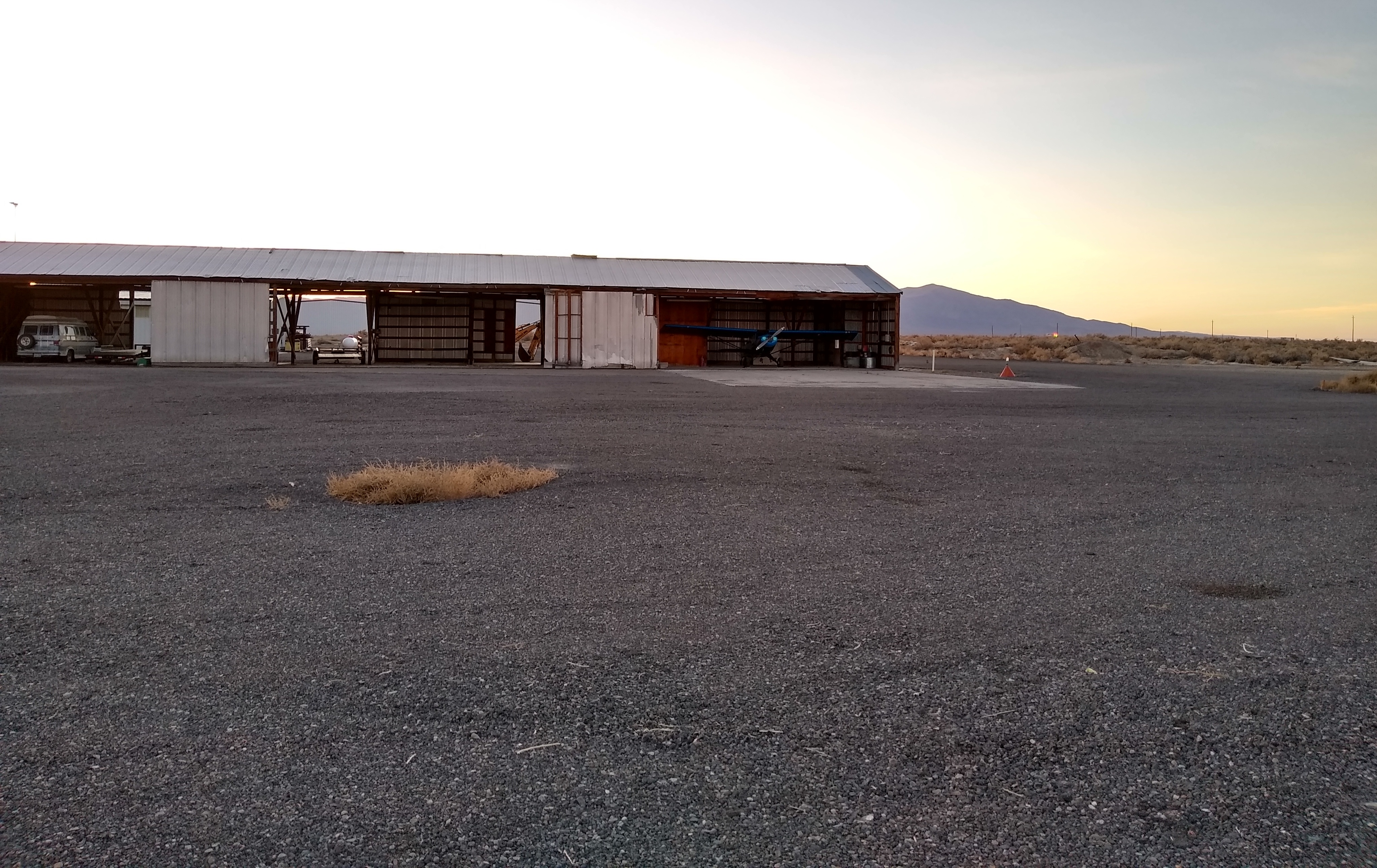
A plane at Battle Mountain Airport

Battle Mountain Airport (IATA: BAM, ICAO: KBAM, FAA LID: BAM), also known as Lander County Airport, is 3 miles (5 km) southeast of Battle Mountain, Nevada, United States. This general aviation airport is owned by Lander County and operated by the Battle Mountain Airport Authority.

== History ==
The airport was built by the United States Army Air Forces about 1942, and was known as Battle Mountain Flight Strip. It was an emergency landing airfield by the Reno Army Air Base for military aircraft on training flights. It was also designated as a CAA Intermediate Field for civil aircraft emergency use. It was closed after World War II, and was turned over for local government use by the War Assets Administration (WAA).

== Facilities ==
The airport covers 1,066 acres (431 ha) and has two runways and two helipads:

- 3/21: 7,299 x 150 ft (2,225 x 46 m), surface: asphalt
- 12/30: 7,300 x 100 ft (2,225 x 30 m), surface: asphalt
- Helipad H1: 60 x 60 ft (18 x 18 m), surface: concrete
- Helipad H2: 60 x 60 ft (18 x 18 m), surface: concrete

== Organizations ==
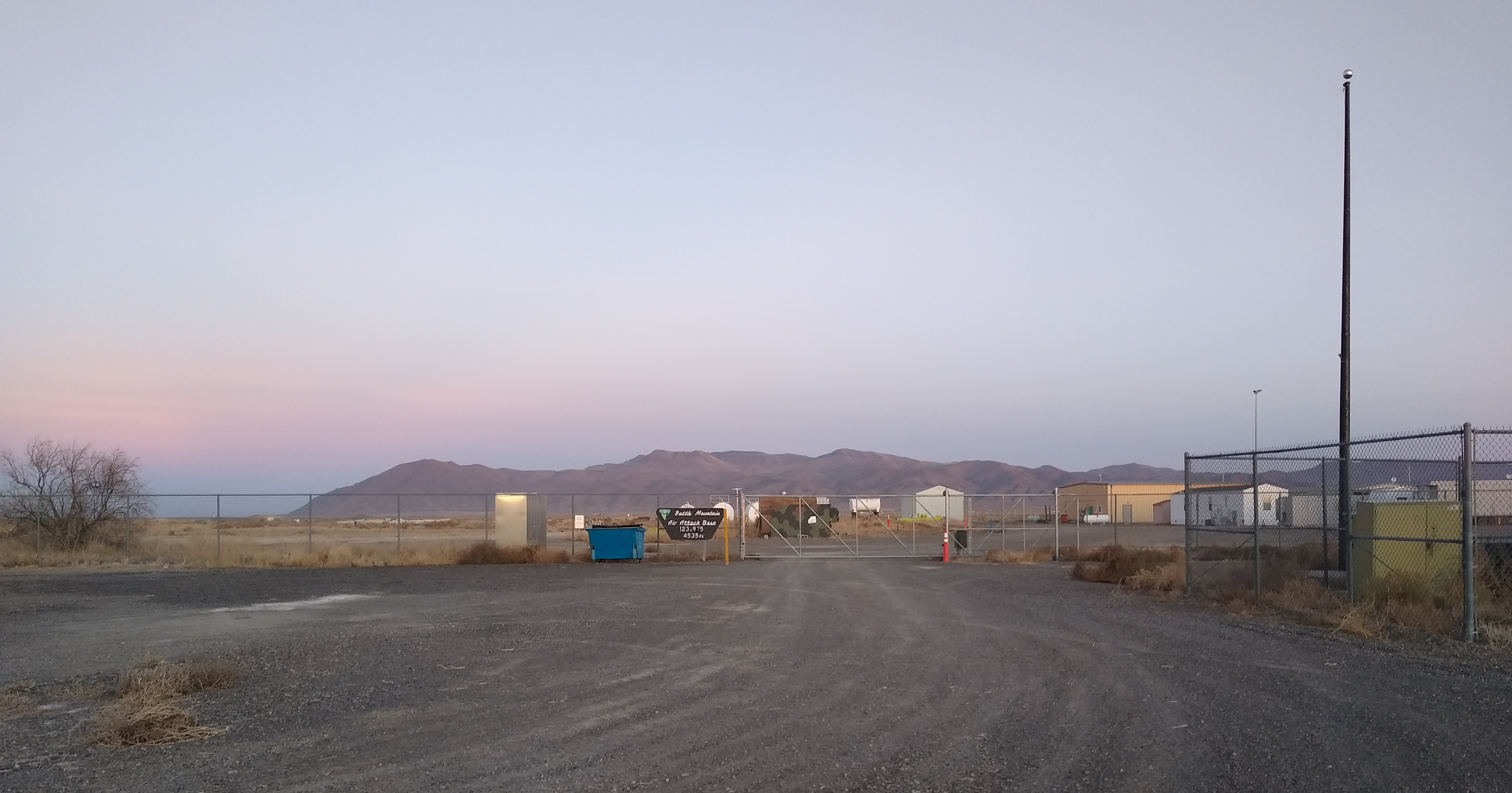
Battle Mountain Air Attack Base

BAM is home to the Battle Mountain Air Attack Base, which is run by the Bureau of Land Management. The Air Attack Base provides air tanker support for fire suppression in northern Nevada. The Nevada Division of Forestry also operates an air tanker base at BAM.

== Displays ==
Several aerospace exhibits are available at the airport.

== Popular culture ==
The airstrip at Battle Mountain was used as a setting by novelist Dale Brown in his techno-thriller novel Battle Born.

== See also ==
- List of airports in Nevada
