= List of highways numbered 311 =

The following highways are numbered Route 311:

== Canada ==
- Manitoba Provincial Road 311
- Nova Scotia Route 311
- Prince Edward Island Route 311
- Quebec Route 311

== China ==
- China National Highway 311

== Costa Rica ==
- National Route 311

== Cuba ==
- Santa Clara–Encrucijada Road (4–311)

== Japan ==
- Japan National Route 311

== United States ==
- U.S. Route 311
- Arkansas Highway 311
- Georgia State Route 311
- Hawaii Route 311
- Indiana State Road 311
- Kentucky Route 311
- Louisiana Highway 311
- Maryland Route 311
- M-311 (Michigan highway)
- Mississippi Highway 311
- Montana Secondary Highway 311
- New York:
  - New York State Route 311
  - County Route 311 (Albany County, New York)
  - County Route 311 (Westchester County, New York)
- North Carolina Highway 311 (former)
- Puerto Rico Highway 311
- South Carolina Highway 311
- Tennessee State Route 311
- Texas:
  - Texas State Highway 311 (former)
  - Texas State Highway Spur 311
  - Farm to Market Road 311
- Utah State Route 311
- Virginia State Route 311
- Washington State Route 311 (former)
- West Virginia Route 311
- Wyoming Highway 311

== United Arab Emirates ==
- E 311, also known as Sheikh Mohammed bin Zayed Road

Preceded by 310	Lists of highways 311	Succeeded by 312
