= List of highways numbered 300 =

The following highways are numbered 300:

== Australia ==
- Midland Highway (Victoria)
- Melba Highway (Victoria)

== Canada ==
- Manitoba Provincial Road 300

== Cuba ==
- Santiago de las Vegas–Cuatro Caminos Road (2–300)

== Japan ==
- Japan National Route 300

== Korea, South ==
- Daejeon Southern Ring Expressway

== Turkey ==
- D.300, a west–east state road in Turkey running from Çeşme, İzmir Province to Kapıköy at the Iranian border.

== United Kingdom ==
- A300 road

== United States ==
- Arkansas Highway 300
- Colorado State Highway 300
- Delaware Route 300
- Florida State Road 300
- Georgia State Route 300
  - Georgia State Route 300 Connector
  - Georgia State Route 300 (former)
- Iowa Highway 300 (former)
- Kentucky Route 300
- Louisiana Highway 300
- Maryland Route 300
- Minnesota State Highway 300 (former)
- Montana Secondary Highway 300
- New Jersey Route 300 (former)
- New Mexico State Road 300
- New York State Route 300
- Ohio State Route 300
- Pennsylvania Route 300 (official designation for Pennsylvania Route 283)
- Puerto Rico Highway 300
- South Carolina Highway 300
- Tennessee State Route 300 (unsigned)
- Texas State Highway 300
  - Texas State Highway Spur 300
  - Farm to Market Road 300
- Utah State Route 300 (former)
- Virginia State Route 300
- Washington State Route 300

Preceded by 299	Lists of highways 300	Succeeded by 301
