= List of highways numbered 309 =

The following highways are numbered 309:

== Canada ==
- Manitoba Provincial Road 309
- Nova Scotia Route 309
- Prince Edward Island Route 309
- Quebec Route 309
- Saskatchewan Highway 309

== China ==
- China National Highway 309

== Costa Rica ==
- National Route 309

== India ==
- National Highway 309 (India)

== Japan ==
- Japan National Route 309

== United Kingdom ==
- A309 road, Twickenham to Hook, London

== United States ==
- U.S. Route 309 (former)
- Arkansas Highway 309
- Connecticut Route 309
- Florida State Road 309 (former)
- Georgia State Route 309
- Kentucky Route 309
- Louisiana Highway 309
- Maryland Route 309
- Minnesota State Highway 309
- Mississippi Highway 309
- New Mexico State Road 309
- New York:
  - New York State Route 309
  - County Route 309 (Erie County, New York)
  - County Route 309 (Westchester County, New York)
- Ohio State Route 309
  - Ohio State Route 309 (former)
- Pennsylvania Route 309
  - Pennsylvania Route 309 Business
- Puerto Rico Highway 309
- South Carolina Highway 309 (former)
- Tennessee State Route 309
- Texas:
  - Texas State Highway 309
  - Texas State Highway Spur 309
  - Farm to Market Road 309
- Utah State Route 309
- Virginia State Route 309

Preceded by 308	Lists of highways 309	Succeeded by 310
