= Galena, Lander County, Nevada =

Ghost town in Nevada, US

Coordinates: 40°33′52″N 117°07′48″W

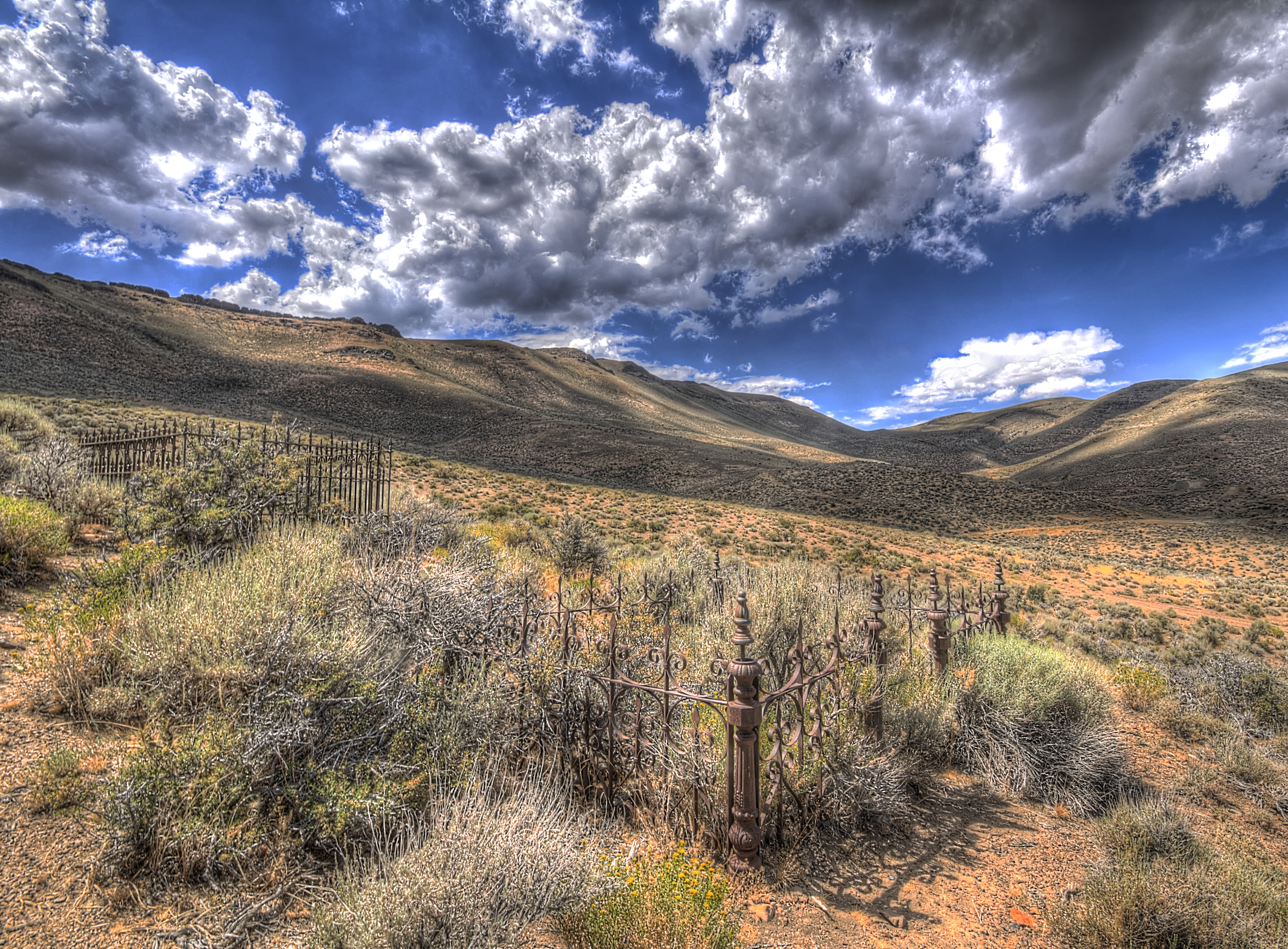
Galena, Lander County

Galena is a ghost town in Lander County, Nevada, about 11 miles (18 km) southwest of Battle Mountain.

== History ==
Galena was founded in 1869 as a mining community, particularly for silver. The community was named for deposits of galena ore near the original town site. The Galena post office was closed in 1907.

The settlement that was now a few hundred people began to give in to other mining towns. In 1886, the French Mining Company took over control of the mines and ended further development. Some mining activities resumed around World War I and continued sporadically into the 1960s.

The population was around 200 in 1940.

== See also ==
- Galena, Washoe County, Nevada – another ghost town of the same name
