= List of highways numbered 304 =

The following highways are numbered 304:

== Brazil ==
- BR-304

== Canada ==
- Manitoba Provincial Road 304
- Nova Scotia Route 304
- Prince Edward Island Route 304
- Saskatchewan Highway 304

== China ==
- China National Highway 304

== Costa Rica ==
- National Route 304

== Hungary ==
- Main road 304 (Hungary)

== Japan ==
- Japan National Route 304

== Thailand ==
- Highway 304 (Thailand)

== United Kingdom ==
- A304 road

== United States ==
- Arkansas Highway 304
  - Arkansas Highway 304N
- Florida State Road 304 (former)
- Georgia State Route 304 (former)
- Louisiana Highway 304
- Maryland Route 304
- Mississippi Highway 304
- Montana Secondary Highway 304
- Nevada State Route 304
- New Mexico State Road 304
- New York State Route 304
- North Carolina Highway 304
- Ohio State Route 304
- Pennsylvania Route 304
  - Pennsylvania Route 304 Truck
- South Carolina Highway 304
- Tennessee State Route 304
- Texas:
  - Texas State Highway 304
  - Texas State Highway Loop 304
  - Farm to Market Road 304
- Utah State Route 304
- Virginia State Route 304
- Washington State Route 304

Other areas:

- Puerto Rico Highway 304
- U.S. Virgin Islands Highway 304

Preceded by 303	Lists of highways 304	Succeeded by 305
