= List of highways numbered 303 =

The following highways are numbered 303:

== Canada ==
- New Brunswick Route 303
- Nova Scotia Route 303
- Prince Edward Island Route 303
- Quebec Route 303
- Saskatchewan Highway 303

== China ==
- China National Highway 303

== Costa Rica ==
- National Route 303

== India ==
- National Highway 303 (India)

== Japan ==
- Japan National Route 303

== Philippines ==
- N303 highway (Philippines)

== United Kingdom ==
- A303 road (Basingstoke-Honiton)

== United States ==
- Arizona State Route 303
- Arkansas Highway 303
- Alabama Highway 303
- Georgia State Route 303
- Indiana State Road 303
- Kentucky Route 303
- Louisiana Highway 303
- Maryland Route 303
- Minnesota State Highway 303 (former)
- New Jersey Route 303 (never built)
- New York:
  - New York State Route 303
  - County Route 303 (Albany County, New York)
  - County Route 303 (Erie County, New York)
  - County Route 303 (Westchester County, New York)
- North Carolina Highway 303 (former)
- Ohio State Route 303
- Pennsylvania Route 303 (former)
- South Carolina Highway 303
- Tennessee State Route 303
- Texas:
  - Texas State Highway 303 (former)
  - Texas State Highway Spur 303
  - Farm to Market Road 303
  - Urban Road 303 (signed as Farm to Market Road 303)
- Utah State Route 303
- Virginia State Route 303
- Washington State Route 303

Other areas:

- Puerto Rico Highway 303
- U.S. Virgin Islands Highway 303

Preceded by 302	Lists of highways 303	Succeeded by 304
