= Battle Mountain High School (Nevada) =

Location
- 435 Weaver Avenue; Battle Mountain, Nevada 89820; United States; 40.63430°N 116.93610°W

Information
- Type: Public
- Established: 1983
- School district: Lander County School District
- Principal: John Stern
- Staff: 15.00 (FTE)
- Grades: 9 to 12
- Student to teacher ratio: 20.53
- Color
- Mascot: Longhorn
- Website: http://bmhs.lander.k12.nv.us/

Battle Mountain High School is a secondary school in Lander County, Nevada. It was built in 1983, and continues to serve as Battle Mountain's primary high school today.

== Athletics ==
The athletics program at Battle Mountain is known as the Longhorns and are affiliated with the Nevada Interscholastic Activities Association.

=== Nevada Interscholastic Activities Association State Championships ===
- Baseball - 1976, 1978, 1981, 1986, 2002
- Golf (Girls) - 2008
- Wrestling - 1988, 1989, 1994, 2001, 2002, 2003, 2004, 2005, 2006, 2007, 2008, 2010, 2013, 2014, 2015, 2016, 2017, 2018
