= North Battle Mountain, Nevada =

Unincorporated community in Nevada, US

- Unincorporated community
- Location within Nevada
- Coordinates: 40°42′46″N 116°54′00″W
- Country: United States
- State: Nevada
- County: Lander
- Elevation: 4,501 ft (1,372 m)
- Time zone: UTC-8 (Pacific (PST))
  - Summer (DST): UTC-7 (PDT)
- Area code: 775
- GNIS feature ID: 847430

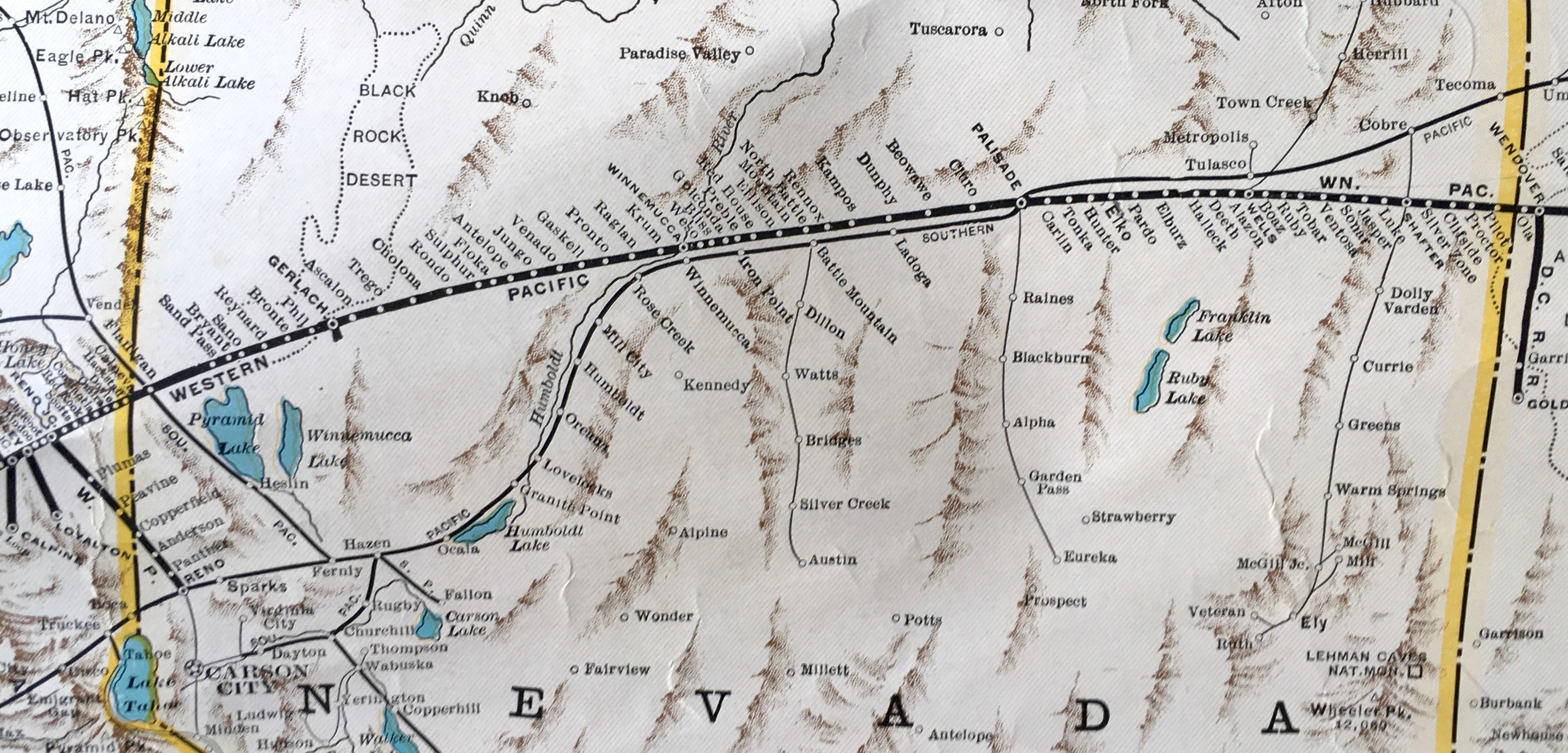
Western Pacific in Nevada 1931 showing "North Battle"

North Battle Mountain is an unincorporated community in Lander County, Nevada, United States. North Battle Mountain is located at the northern terminus of Nevada State Route 806 5 miles (8.0 km) north-northeast of Battle Mountain.

North Battle Mountain was a station on the Western Pacific Railroad.

North Battle Mountain is located North Battle Mountain Mining Area, which has barite, silver, lead, copper and gold resources.
