= List of highways numbered 307 =

The following highways are numbered 307:

== Brazil ==
- BR-307

== Canada ==
- Manitoba Provincial Road 307
- Nova Scotia Route 307
- Prince Edward Island Route 307
- Quebec Route 307
- Saskatchewan Highway 307

== China ==
- China National Highway 307

== Costa Rica ==
- National Route 307

== India ==
- National Highway 307 (India)

== Japan ==
- Japan National Route 307

== Mexico ==
- Mexican Federal Highway 307
- Mexican Federal Highway 307D

== Philippines ==
- N307 highway (Philippines)

== United Kingdom ==
- A307 road

== United States ==
- Florida:
  - County Road 307 (Gilchrist County, Florida)
  - County Road 307 (Gilchrist County, Florida)
- Georgia State Route 307
- Kentucky Route 307
- Louisiana Highway 307
- Maryland Route 307
- Montana Secondary Highway 307 (former)
- New York:
  - New York State Route 307 (former)
  - County Route 307 (Albany County, New York)
  - County Route 307 (Erie County, New York)
- North Carolina Highway 307
- Ohio State Route 307
- Pennsylvania Route 307
- Puerto Rico Highway 307
- Tennessee State Route 307
- Texas:
  - Texas State Highway 307 (former)
  - Texas State Highway Loop 307
  - Farm to Market Road 307
- Utah State Route 307 (former)
- Virginia State Route 307
- Washington State Route 307
- West Virginia Route 307

Preceded by 306	Lists of highways 307	Succeeded by 308
