= List of highways numbered 301 =

Route 301 or Highway 301 could refer to:

== Canada ==
- Manitoba Provincial Road 301
- Newfoundland and Labrador Route 301
- Nova Scotia Route 301
- Prince Edward Island Route 301
- Quebec Route 301
- Saskatchewan Highway 301

== China ==
- China National Highway 301

== Costa Rica ==
- National Route 301

== Germany ==
- Bundesstraße 301

== Japan ==
- Japan National Route 301

== Korea, South ==
- Sangju–Yeongcheon Expressway

== Philippines ==
- N301 highway (Philippines)

== United Kingdom ==
- A301 road

== United States ==
- U.S. Route 301 (former)
- U.S. Route 301
- Arkansas Highway 301
- Georgia State Route 301
- Indiana State Road 301
- Iowa Highway 301 (former)
- Kentucky Route 301
- Louisiana Highway 301
- Maryland Route 301
- Minnesota State Highway 301
- Mississippi Highway 301
- New York:
  - New York State Route 301
  - County Route 301 (Albany County, New York)
  - County Route 301 (Erie County, New York)
  - County Route 301 (Westchester County, New York)
- North Carolina Highway 301 (former)
- Ohio State Route 301
- Pennsylvania Route 301 (former)
- Tennessee State Route 301
- Texas:
  - Texas State Highway 301 (former)
  - Texas State Highway Loop 301
  - Farm to Market Road 301
- Utah State Route 301
- Virginia State Route 301

Other areas:

- Puerto Rico Highway 301
- U.S. Virgin Islands Highway 301

== Film ==
- Highway 301 (film), a 1950 film noir by Andrew L. Stone

Preceded by 300	Lists of highways 301	Succeeded by 302
