= List of highways numbered 302 =

The following highways are numbered 302:

== Canada ==
- Manitoba Provincial Road 302
- Nova Scotia Route 302
- Prince Edward Island Route 302
- Saskatchewan Highway 302

== China ==
- China National Highway 302

== India ==
- National Highway 302 (India)

== Japan ==
- Japan National Route 302

== Philippines ==
- N302 highway (Philippines)

== Thailand ==
- Thailand Route 302

== United Kingdom ==
- A302 road

== United States ==
- U.S. Route 302
- Connecticut Route 302
- Georgia State Route 302
  - Georgia State Route 302 Spur
- Kentucky Route 302
- Louisiana Highway 302
- Maryland Route 302
- Minnesota State Highway 302 (former)
- Mississippi Highway 302
- Montana Secondary Highway 302
- New York State Route 302
- North Carolina Highway 302 (former)
- Ohio State Route 302
- Pennsylvania Route 302 (former)
- South Carolina Highway 302
- Tennessee State Route 302
- Texas:
  - Texas State Highway 302
  - Texas State Highway Spur 302
  - Farm to Market Road 302
- Utah State Route 302
- Virginia State Route 302
  - Virginia State Route 302 (former)
- Washington State Route 302
  - Washington State Route 302 Spur

Other areas:

- Puerto Rico Highway 302
- U.S. Virgin Islands Highway 302

Preceded by 301	Lists of highways 302	Succeeded by 303
