= List of highways numbered 299 =

The following highways are numbered 299:

== Canada ==
- Quebec Route 299

== Japan ==
- Japan National Route 299

== United States ==
- U.S. Route 299 (former)
- Alabama State Route 299
- Arkansas Highway 299
- California State Route 299
- Delaware Route 299
- Georgia State Route 299
- Iowa Highway 299 (former)
- Kentucky Route 299
- Maryland Route 299
- Minnesota State Highway 299
- New York State Route 299
  - County Route 299 (Erie County, New York)
- Ohio State Route 299 (former)
- Oklahoma State Highway 299 (former)
- Pennsylvania Route 299
- Tennessee State Route 299
- Texas State Highway 299 (former)
  - Texas State Highway Spur 299
  - Farm to Market Road 299 (proposed)
- Utah State Route 299
- Virginia State Route 299

Preceded by 298	Lists of highways 299	Succeeded by 300
