= List of highways numbered 306 =

The following highways are numbered 306:

== Canada ==
- Nova Scotia Route 306
- Prince Edward Island Route 306
- Saskatchewan Highway 306

== China ==
- China National Highway 306

== Costa Rica ==
- National Route 306

== Hungary ==
- Main road 306 (Hungary)

== India ==
- National Highway 306 (India)

== Japan ==
- Japan National Route 306

== Philippines ==
- N306 highway (Philippines)

== United States ==
- Arkansas Highway 306
- Florida State Road 306 (former)
- Georgia State Route 306
- Iowa Highway 306 (former)
- Kentucky Route 306
- Louisiana Highway 306
- Maryland Route 306
- Mississippi Highway 306
- Montana Secondary Highway 306
- Nevada State Route 306
- New York:
  - New York State Route 306
  - County Route 306 (Albany County, New York)
  - County Route 306 (Erie County, New York)
- North Carolina Highway 306
- Ohio State Route 306
- Tennessee State Route 306
- Texas State Highway 306 (former)
  - Texas State Highway Loop 306
  - Farm to Market Road 306
- Utah State Route 306
- Virginia State Route 306
- Washington State Route 306 (former)

Other areas:

- Puerto Rico Highway 306
- U.S. Virgin Islands Highway 306

Preceded by 305	Lists of highways 306	Succeeded by 307
