= Pittsburg, Nevada =

Unincorporated community in Nevada, US

- Ghost town
- Location within Nevada Location within the United States
- Coordinates: 40°25′43″N 116°49′20″W
- Country: United States
- State: Nevada
- County: Lander
- Elevation: 6,132 ft (1,869 m)
- Time zone: UTC-8 (Pacific (PST))
  - Summer (DST): UTC-7 (PDT)

Pittsburg, Nevada is a ghost town in Lander County, Nevada. It was named for the industrial heritage of Pittsburgh, Pennsylvania.

The Post Office operated from 1888 until March 1892 as Pittsburgh, when the name was changed to Pittsburg. The Post Office continued to operate until 1893 and then from 1897 until 1900.
