= List of highways numbered 308 =

The following highways are numbered 308:

== Brazil ==
- BR-308

== Canada ==
- Manitoba Provincial Road 308
- Nova Scotia Route 308
- Prince Edward Island Route 308
- Saskatchewan Highway 308

== China ==
- China National Highway 308

== Costa Rica ==
- National Route 308

== Japan ==
- Japan National Route 308

== United Kingdom ==
- A308 road

== United States ==
- Arkansas Highway 308
- Florida State Road 308 (former)
  - County Road 308 (Putnam County, Florida)
    - County Road 308B (Putnam County, Florida)
- Georgia State Route 308
- Kentucky Route 308
- Louisiana Highway 308
- Maryland Route 308 (unsigned)
- Minnesota State Highway 308
- Montana Secondary Highway 308
- New York State Route 308
  - County Route 308 (Albany County, New York)
  - County Route 308 (Erie County, New York)
  - County Route 308 (Wayne County, New York)
- North Carolina Highway 308
- Ohio State Route 308
- Pennsylvania Route 308
- South Carolina Highway 308
- Tennessee State Route 308
- Texas State Highway 308
  - Texas State Highway Loop 308
  - Farm to Market Road 308
- Utah State Route 308 (former)
- Virginia State Route 308
- Washington State Route 308

- Puerto Rico Highway 308
- U.S. Virgin Islands Highway 308

Preceded by 307	Lists of highways 308	Succeeded by 309
