= List of highways numbered 310 =

The following highways are numbered Route 310:

== Canada ==
- New Brunswick Route 310
- Newfoundland and Labrador Route 310
- Prince Edward Island Route 310
- Saskatchewan Highway 310

== China ==
- China National Highway 310

== Costa Rica ==
- National Route 310

== Japan ==
- Japan National Route 310

== United States ==
- Interstate 310:
  - Interstate 310
    - Interstate 310 (former proposal)
  - Interstate 310 (Mississippi) (former proposal)
- U.S. Route 310
- Arkansas Highway 310
- Florida State Road 310 (former)
- Georgia State Route 310
- Hawaii Route 310
- Kentucky Route 310
- Louisiana Highway 310 (former)
- Maryland Route 310
- Minnesota State Highway 310
- Mississippi Highway 310
- Montana Secondary Highway 310
- New York:
  - New York State Route 310
    - New York State Route 310 (former)
  - County Route 310 (Erie County, New York)
  - County Route 310 (Westchester County, New York)
- Ohio State Route 310
- Pennsylvania Route 310
- Puerto Rico Highway 310
- South Carolina Highway 310
- Tennessee State Route 310
- Texas:
  - Texas State Highway 310
  - Farm to Market Road 310
- Utah State Route 310
- Virginia State Route 310
  - Virginia State Route 310 (former)
- Washington State Route 310
- West Virginia Route 310
- Wisconsin Highway 310
- Wyoming Highway 310

Preceded by 309	Lists of highways 310	Succeeded by 311
