= Nevada State Route 305 =

Highway in Nevada

State Route 305
- Austin – Battle Mountain Road
- SR 305 highlighted in red

Route information
- Maintained by NDOT
- Length: 87.717 mi (141.167 km)
- Existed: 1976–present

Major junctions
- South end: US 50 in Austin
- I-80 in Battle Mountain
- North end: SR 304 / I-80 BL in Battle Mountain

Location
- Country: United States
- State: Nevada

Highway system
- Nevada State Highway System; Interstate; US; State; Pre‑1976; Scenic
← SR 304	→ SR 306

State Route 305 (SR 305) is a state highway in Lander County, Nevada. It is the only state highway to connect the southern and northern areas of the county. It runs north from U.S. Route 50 at Austin to Battle Mountain, where it crosses Interstate 80 and ends at State Route 304.

== Route description ==
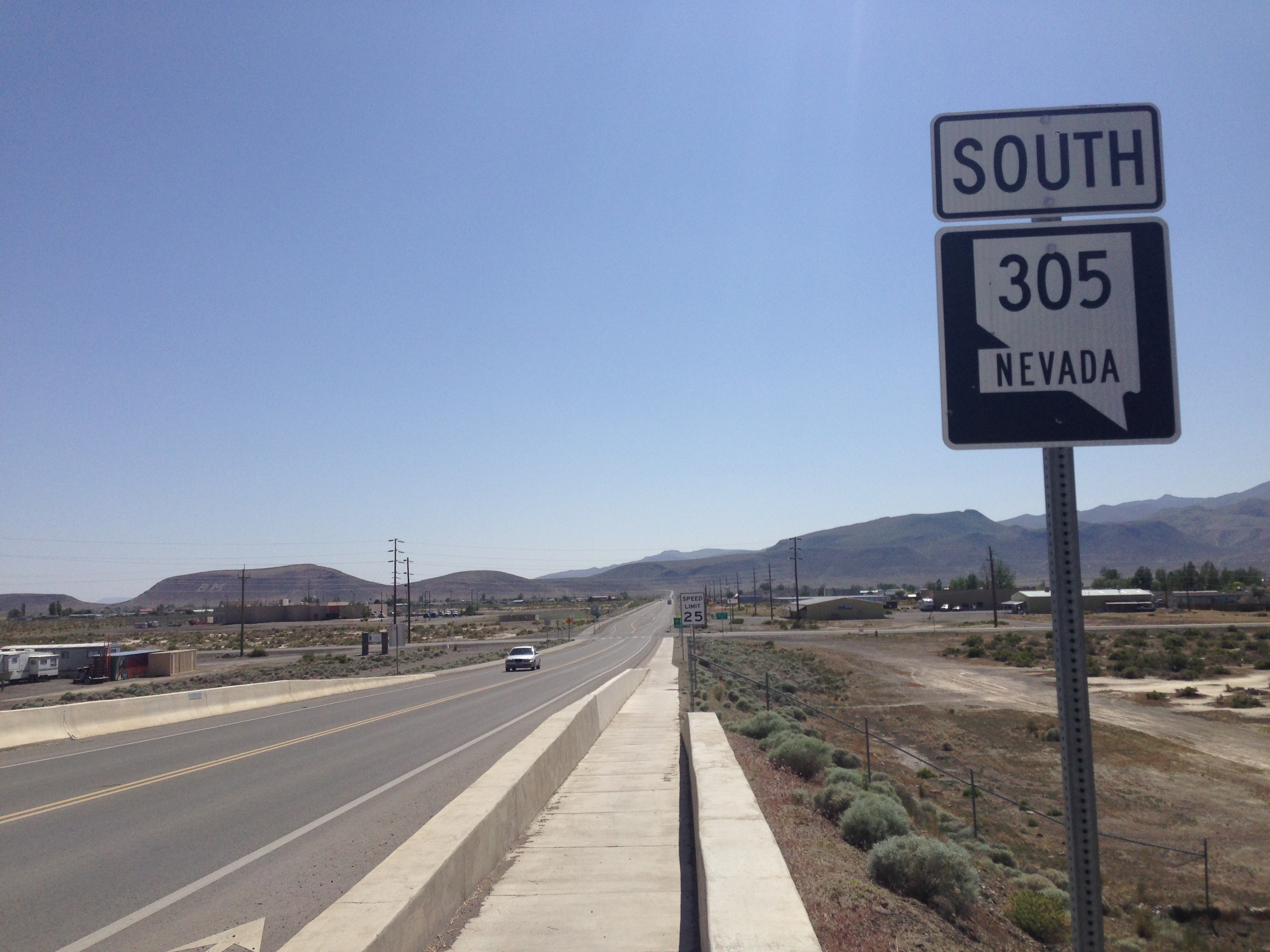
First reassurance shield on southbound SR 305 in Battle Mountain, Nevada

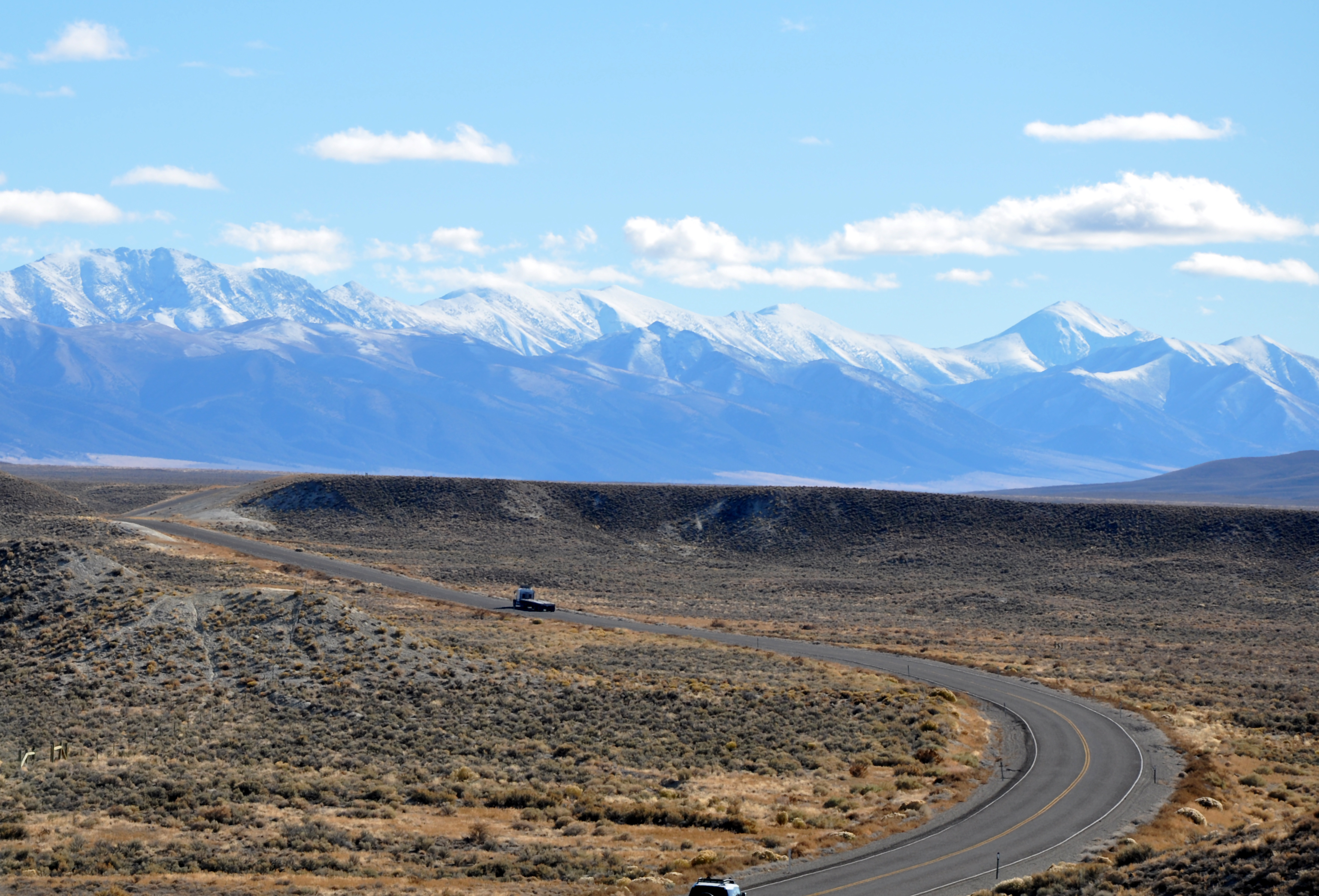
SR 305 with the Toiyabe Range in the background

State Route 305 begins just northwest of the town limits of Austin, Nevada. From there, the route heads in a northerly direction through the Reese River Valley, generally paralleling the Reese River. The highway passes near many ranches and mining sites. After about 20 miles (32 km), SR 305 curves slightly more westward, crossing through the Shoshone Range. The route continues northward, passing the Valley of the Moon along the trek through Reese River Valley. As the route nears the vicinity of the Battle Mountains, it curves northeast to head to the town of the same name. Along this stretch of highway, near milepost 110, are several dirt roads providing access to numerous mining sites. Soon afterward, SR 305 enters Battle Mountain along Broad Street, crossing over Interstate 80 and ending in the middle of the town at an intersection with Front Street (SR 304/I-80 Business).

A five-mile section of SR 305 is the site of a yearly human-powered vehicle (HPV) speed record competition conducted by the IHPVA (International Human Powered Vehicle Association), with the record set to 89.59 mph (144.18 km/h) on September 17, 2016. During repaving in 2009, special attention was paid to the five mile stretch to make sure it was the flattest and smoothest road in the world. It is very slightly downhill, with an average slope of less than 2/3 of one percent, per IHPVA rules.

== History ==
The road dates to back to at least 1929. At that time, it appeared on state maps one segment of the much longer State Route 8A. At the time, it was an unimproved road in the state highway system, and the road approached Battle Mountain from a more southerly direction. The northern end of the current highway alignment southwest of Battle Mountain, serving the present-day mining establishments near the town, was constructed by 1952, although SR 8A continued to follow the previous alignment according to maps. The entire highway was paved by 1953, and the SR 8A designation was moved onto the newer section near Battle Mountain by 1954.

On July 1, 1976, Nevada began renumbering its state highways. In this process, the Austin – Battle Mountain Road segment of SR 8A was reassigned to a new State Route 305. This change was first seen on state maps in 1978. The route has remained relatively unchanged since then.

== Major intersections ==
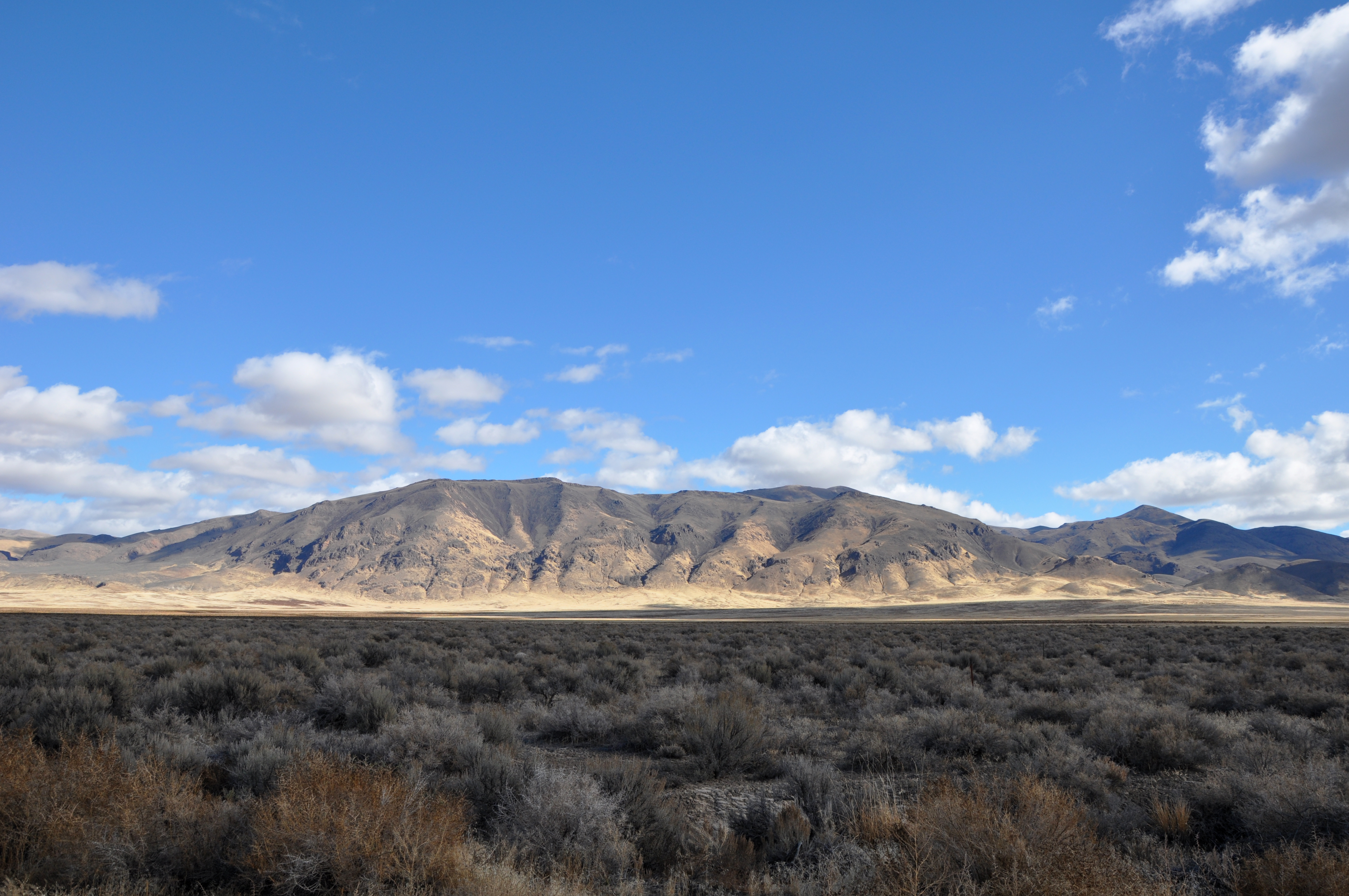
The Shoshone Range, as seen from SR 305 near Battle Mountain

The entire route is in Lander County.

Location	mi	km	Destinations	Notes
Austin	0.000	0.000	US 50 – Austin, Ely, Fallon, Reno	Southern terminus
Battle Mountain			I-80 – Winnemucca, Elko	Interchange; I-80 exit 231
Battle Mountain			6th Street	Serves Battle Mountain General Hospital
Battle Mountain	87.717	141.167	SR 304 / I-80 BL (Front Street) – Winnemucca, Elko	Northern terminus
1.000 mi = 1.609 km; 1.000 km = 0.621 mi

== See also ==
Other segments of former State Route 8A:

- State Route 140, the northern segment that ran west from U.S. Route 95 via Denio to northwestern Nevada.
- State Route 376, the southern segment that ran from near Tonopah to near Austin.
