= Sheep Creek Range =

Mountain range in Nevada, United States

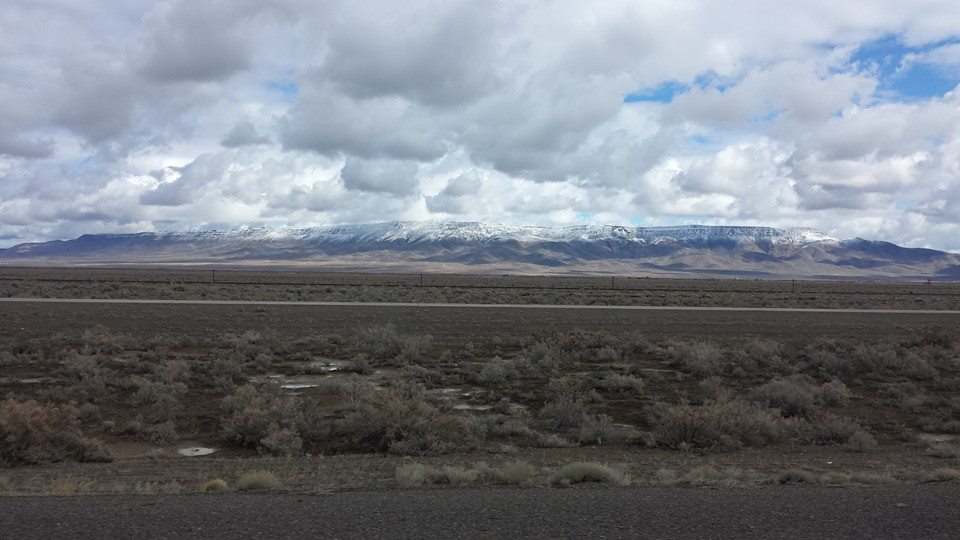
- The Sheep Creek Range northeast of Battle Mountain

Highest point
- Peak: Sterritt Peak
- Elevation: 2,217.72 m (7,276.0 ft)

Geography
- Location within Nevada
- Country: United States
- State: Nevada
- District: Lander County
- Range coordinates: 40°49′33.673″N 116°43′16.348″W
- Topo map: USGS Sheep Creek Range SW

The Sheep Creek Range is a mountain range in Lander County, Nevada, United States. The range is northeast of Battle Mountain. It is the site of a NEXRAD doppler weather radar station of the National Weather Service.
