= Fish Creek Range =

Mountain range in Eureka County, Nevada, US

- Location within Nevada

Highest point
- Elevation: 2,477 m (8,127 ft)

Geography
- Country: United States
- State: Nevada
- District: Eureka County
- Range coordinates: 39°18′37.748″N 116°5′22.212″W
- Topo map: USGS Bellevue Peak

The Fish Creek Range is a mountain range in Eureka County, Nevada.

The range was so named on account of nearby streams well-stocked with fish.
