= Galena, Washoe County, Nevada =

Galena, Nevada
- Ghost town
- Location within Nevada
- Coordinates: 39°20′59″N 119°47′19″W
- Country: United States
- State: Nevada
- County: Washoe
- Elevation: 4,921 ft (1,500 m)
- Time zone: UTC-8 (Pacific (PST))
  - Summer (DST): UTC-7 (PDT)
- Area code: 775
- GNIS feature ID

Nevada Historical Marker
- Reference no.: 212

Galena is an abandoned town in Washoe County, Nevada, south of Reno. The portion of Reno just south of Mount Rose Highway and west of Steamboat Springs is also known as Galena.

Galena was developed as a mining property in 1860, with the discovery of silver in the eastern foothills of the Sierra Nevada. The town greatly expanded after 1862, when it also became an important lumbering center. This was mostly because of high lead sulfate mix in the gold. By 1863, there were eleven sawmills operating in Galena. The town's streets during the height of commercial activity, were crowded with "grog shops overflowed with charcoal burners, wood choppers, timbermen, millers, miners, bullwhackers and teamsters"

Because of the severe winter from 1864 to 1865, freighting to Virginia City was disrupted which forced the mills to close. Destructive fires in 1865 and 1867 leveled parts of the town. There was other mining work in the Carson Range, so many settlers chose to abandon the town.

In 1990, the University of Nevada, Reno Mackay School of Mines operated a training site for students at the nearby Union Mine.

The site is marked by Nevada Historical Marker number 212.

Now, a neighborhood and high school with the same name have developed near the area. Some historic sites such as the cemetery and old schoolhouse can still be found.

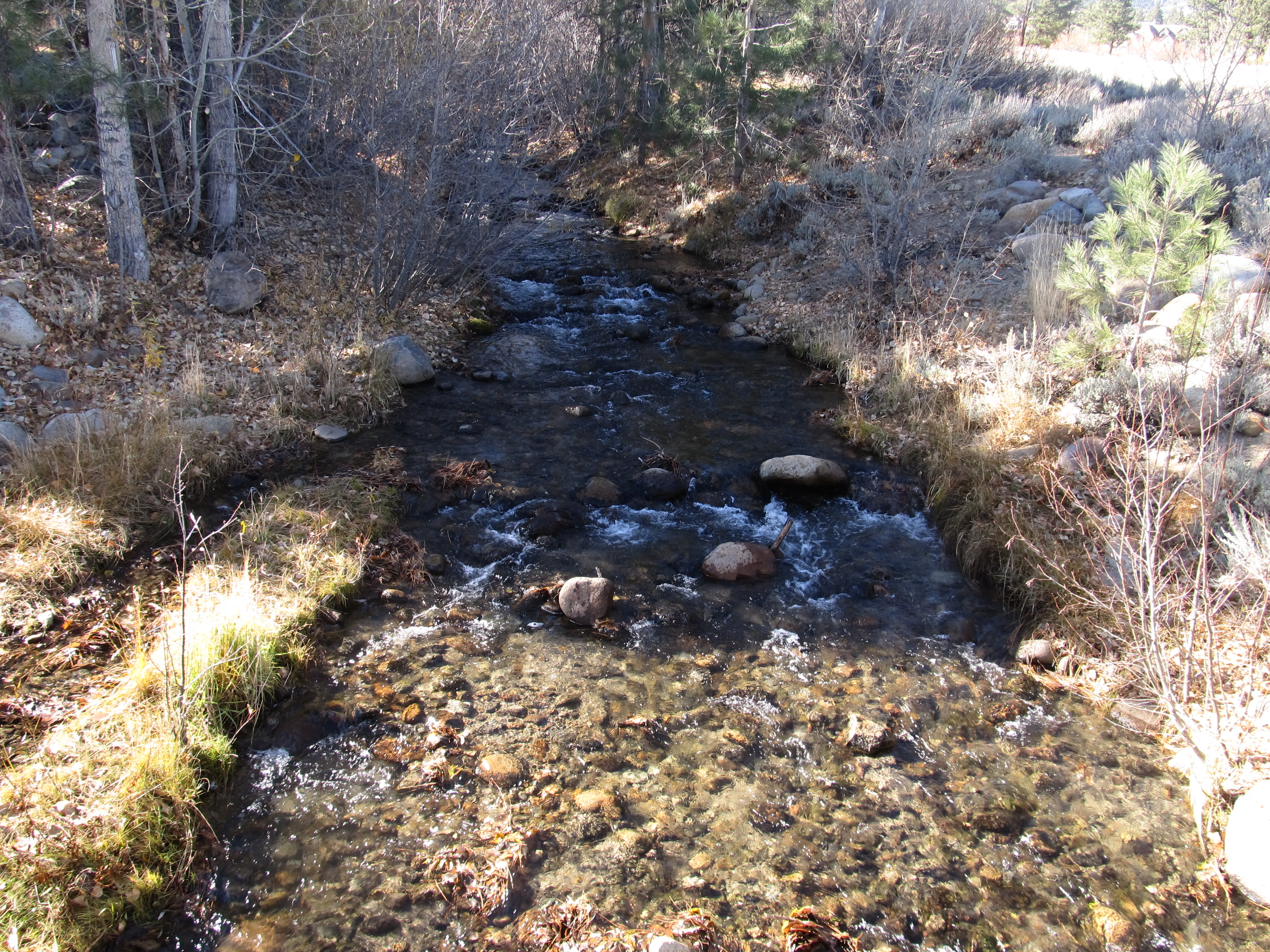
Galena Creek, near Nevada Historical Marker number 212
