= Battle Mountain, Nevada =

Unincorporated town in the State of Nevada, United States

Battle Mountain
- Unincorporated town
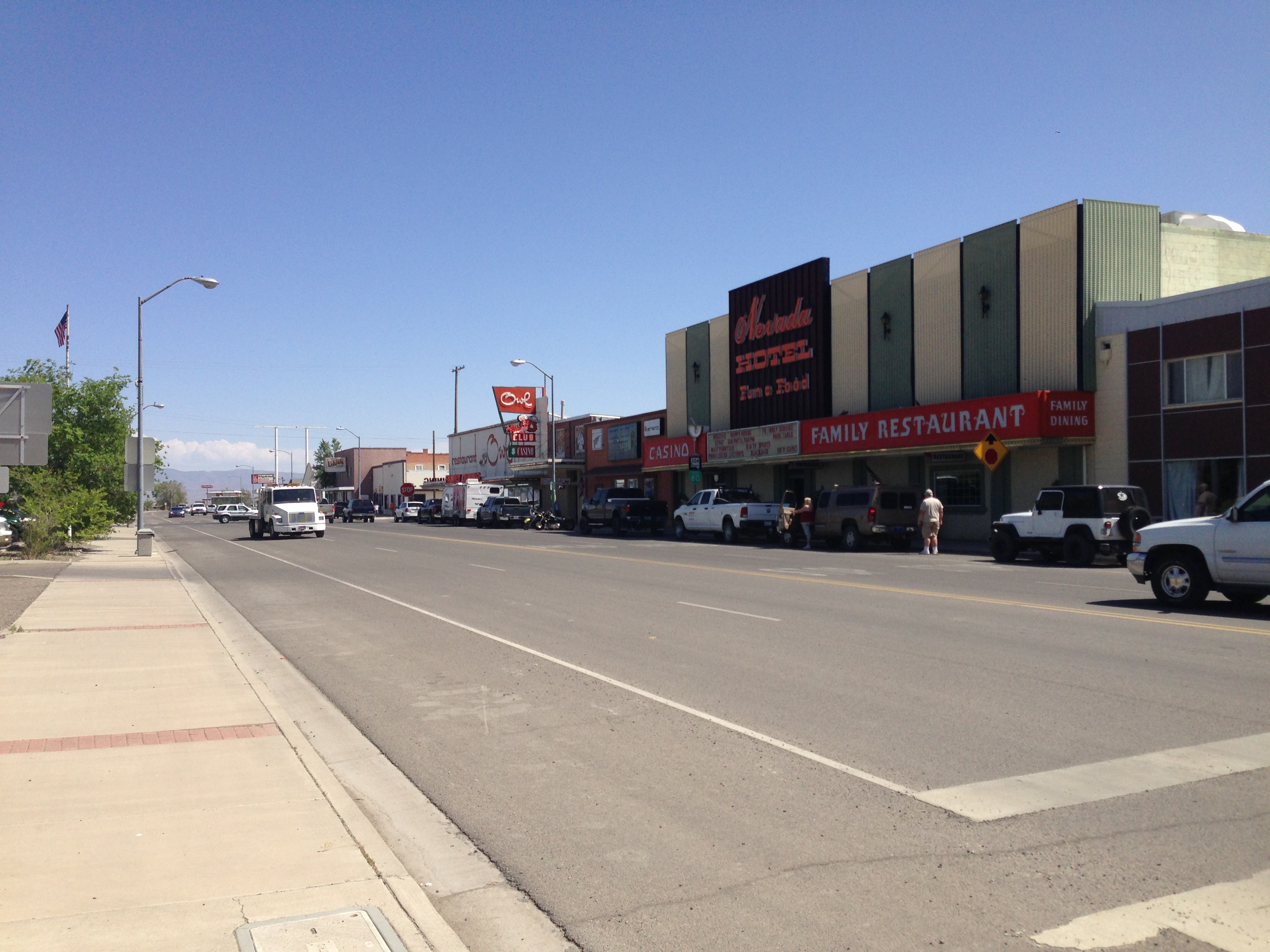
- Front Street in downtown Battle Mountain

- Location of Battle Mountain in Lander County, Nevada

- Location in Nevada Location within the United States
- Coordinates: 40°37′25″N 116°57′12″W
- Country: United States
- State: Nevada
- County: Lander

Area
  - Total: 6.12 sq mi (15.84 km^{2})
  - Land: 6.11 sq mi (15.83 km^{2})
  - Water: 0.0039 sq mi (0.01 km^{2})
- Elevation: 4,521 ft (1,378 m)

Population (2020)
  - Total: 3,705
  - Density: 606.1/sq mi (234.02/km^{2})
- Time zone: UTC−8 (Pacific (PST))
  - Summer (DST): UTC−7 (PDT)
- ZIP code: 89820
- Area code: 775
- FIPS code: 32-04900
- GNIS feature ID: 2407804

Nevada Historical Marker
- Reference no.: 95

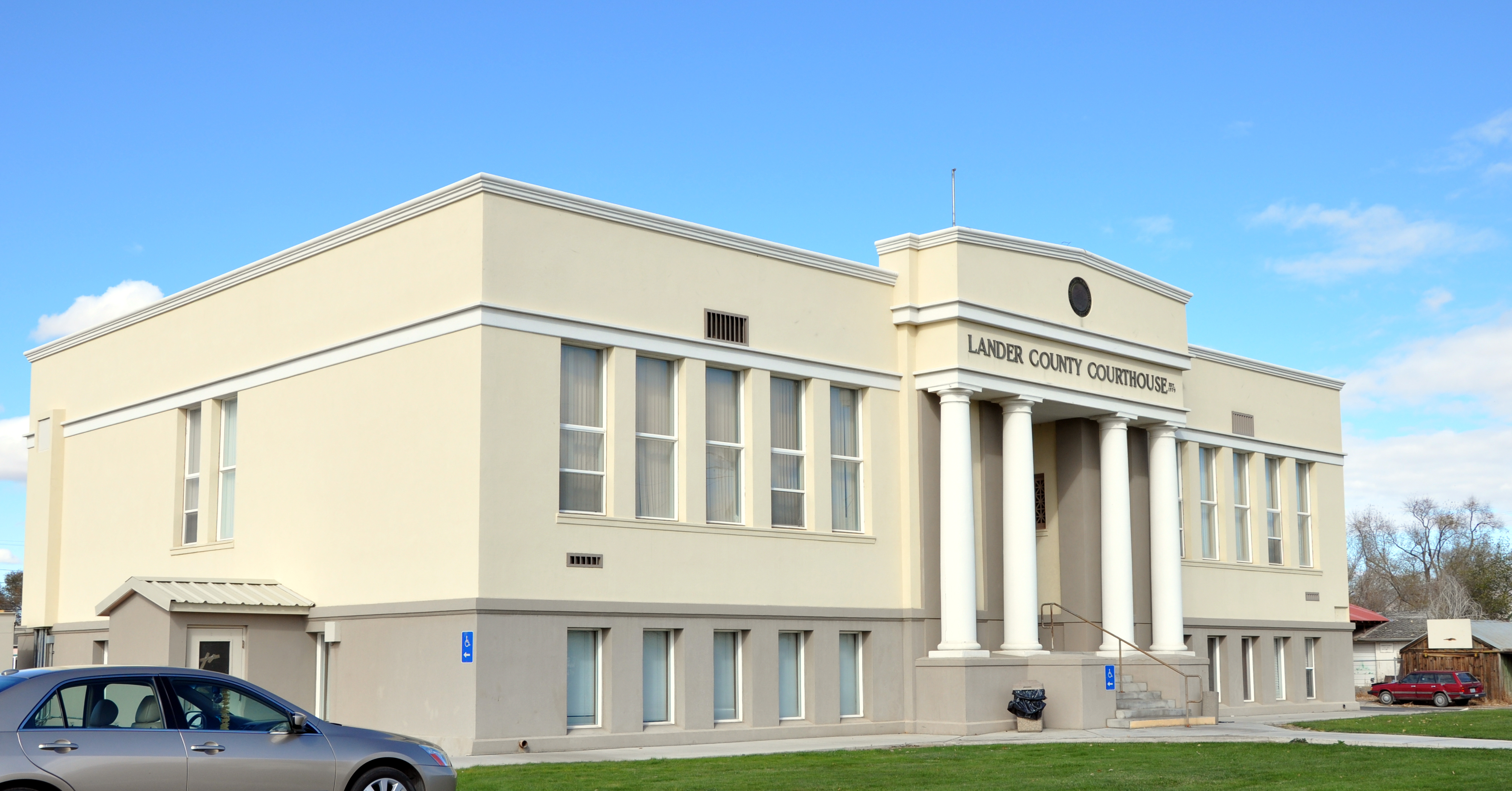
The new Lander County courthouse, 2009

Battle Mountain is an unincorporated town in and the county seat of Lander County, Nevada, United States. The population was 3,705 at the 2020 census. Its primary economic base is gold mining and, to a lesser extent, legalized gambling.

The town is located on Interstate 80 between Winnemucca and Elko.

== History ==
The Battle Mountain area was home to the Northern Paiute and Shoshone peoples. The area was noted by fur trappers in the 1820s and 1830s. It served as a waypoint for westward-bound travel on the Emigrant Trail along the Humboldt River by 1845. According to local legend, the name stems from confrontations between Native Americans and early settlers during the 1850s.

When copper ore was discovered and mining began in 1866, the Central Pacific Railroad started a station in Argenta to support the mining activity. In 1868, the railroad established the Reese River siding in Battle Mountain to support it, but in 1870, the railroad moved the Argenta station to Battle Mountain and established a townsite to serve the Battle Mountain copper and gold mining district. Two railroads headquartered there starting in 1890: the Central Nevada Railway and the Battle Mountain and Lewis Railroad. As of 2009, the railway is still in use.

In 1874, the Nevada Legislature overrode the governor's veto and approved a railroad from Austin to Battle Mountain. The Nevada Central Railroad from Battle Mountain to Austin was completed in 1880. The rail line was constructed to connect the silver mines around Austin to the Central Pacific line at Battle Mountain. The rail line served the Austin area until it was abandoned in 1938.

Ulysses S. Grant spoke in the town in 1879 during his western speaking tour.

President Woodrow Wilson established Battle Mountain Indian Colony by executive order in 1918. In 1919, Nevada's Red Scare Miners held a ten-day strike at the Battle Mountain Copper Mines.

On May 15, 1979, the voters of Lander County approved the move of the county seat from Austin to Battle Mountain in a special election. In a subsequent ruling, the Nevada Supreme Court affirmed this decision.

Chiefs Frank Temoke and Frank Brady refused the government's offer of a payoff under the 1863 Treaty of Ruby Valley at Battle Mountain on December 11, 1992.

The 2008 Wells, Nevada, earthquake of 6.3 magnitude that affected the northeastern part of the state severely damaged one of the city's oldest historical buildings, the Lemaire Building, which was condemned.

== Geography ==
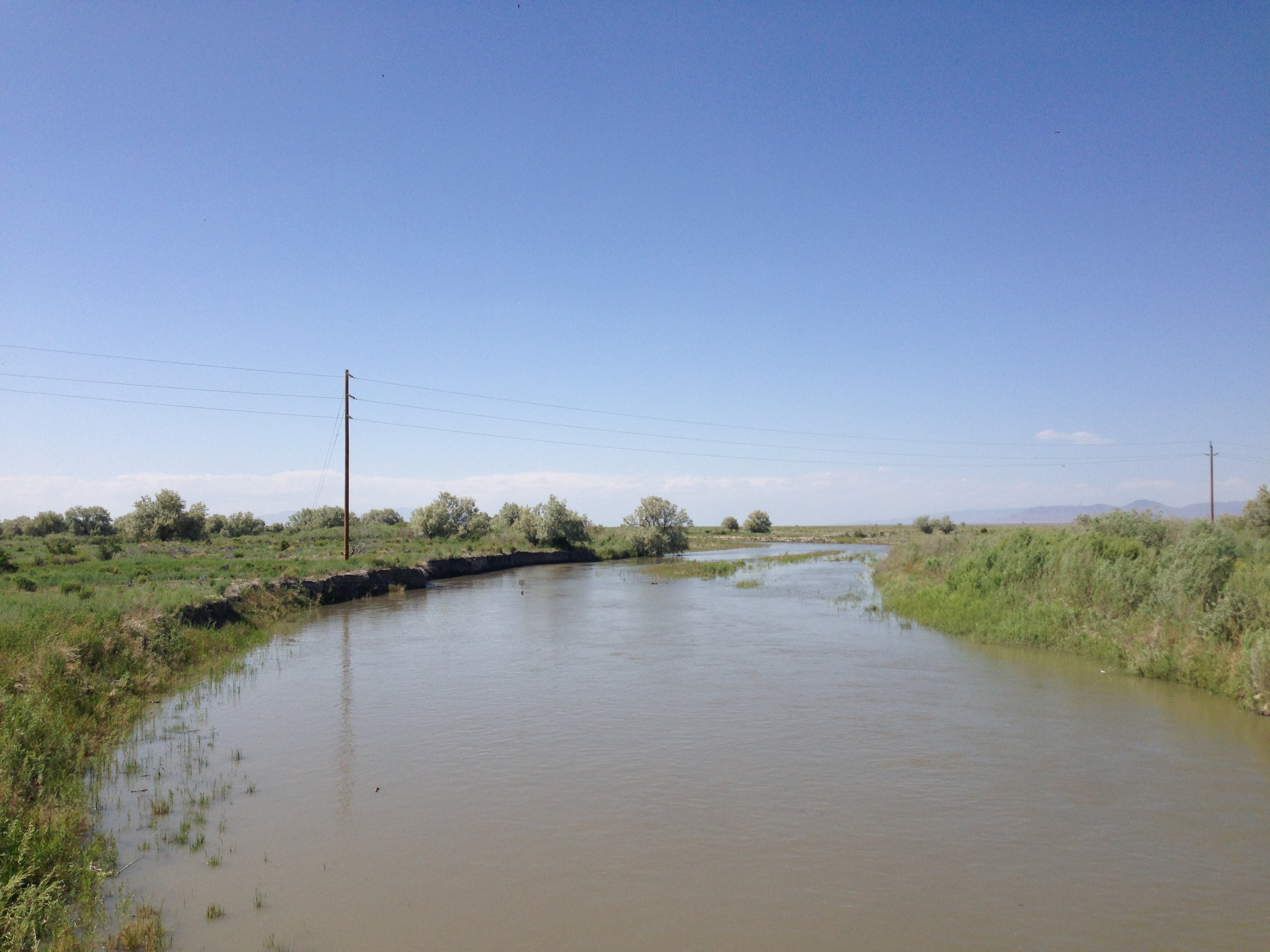
The Humboldt River in Battle Mountain

Battle Mountain is located at the confluence of two rivers, the Humboldt and the Reese. The town is in the Humboldt valley between the Shoshone Range to the southeast, the Battle Mountains to the southwest and the Sheep Creek Range across the Humboldt to the north.

According to the United States Census Bureau, the community has a total area of 3.6 square miles or 9.3 square kilometres, all land.

=== Geology ===
Copper mining started in 1866 and the Copper Canyon Mine operated from 1917 until 1955. The Tomboy-Minnie ore deposits were developed after the depletion of the West ore body, which was developed after the depletion of the East ore body. Open-pit mining started in 1967. Placer gold was discovered in 1912. Mining switched from the copper-gold-silver ores to gold-silver ores in 1979. The Fortitude gold-silver skarn body was discovered in 1981. The Surprise gold deposit was discovered in 1986.

The economic geologic zone is primarily in the Antler Sequence, consisting of the Middle Pennsylvanian Battle Formation, the Pennsylvanian to Permian Antler Peak Limestone, and the Permian Edna Mountain Formation. These Paleozoic rocks were intruded in the Tertiary by a granodiorite porphyry which generated the ore bodies as zones of disseminated sulfide minerals. These zones include copper-gold-silver next to the granodiorite, followed by a gold-silver zone, then a lead-zinc-silver zone.

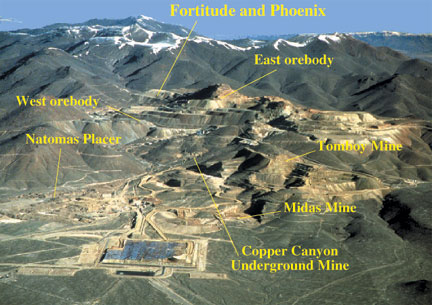
Gold and copper mines in the Battle Mountain Mining District. As of 2019, the mines are operated by Newmont Goldcorp as the Phoenix Mine.

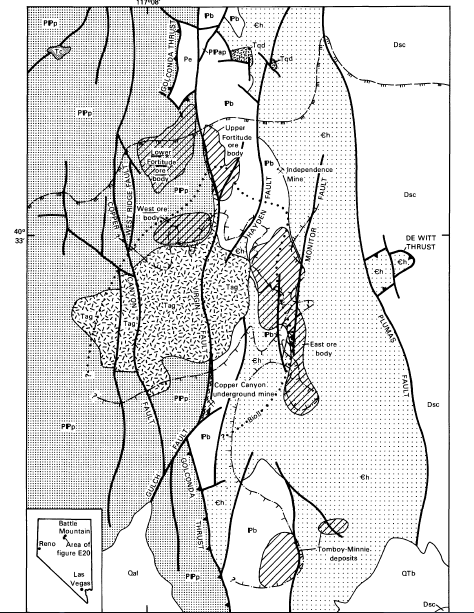
Battle Mountain Geology Map

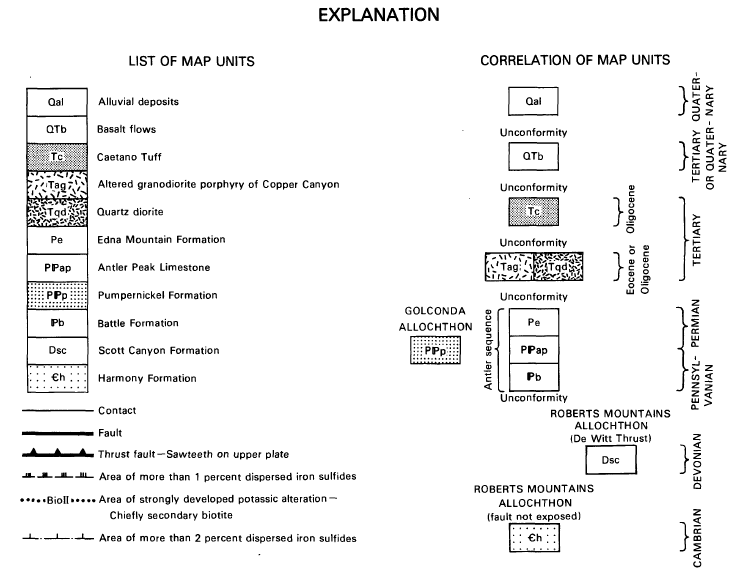
Battle Mountain Geology Map Index

=== Battle Mountain meteorite ===
A meteorite fall was reported on 22 Aug 2012 on Battle Mountain at coordinates 40.66813°N 117.18913°W. It was classified as an ordinary chondrite, and a 1.4-pound (630-gram) fragment was sent to NASA's Jet Propulsion Laboratory for analysis.

=== Climate ===
Battle Mountain's climate is cool semi-arid (Köppen climate classification BSk), receiving just enough precipitation to avoid arid classification. Due to aridity and high elevation, the area experiences large diurnal temperature variation, particularly in summer, when it averages almost 45 °F or 25 °C. The monthly daily average temperature ranges from 29.8 °F or −1.2 °C in January to 73.6 °F or 23.1 °C in July. There are, on average, sixteen afternoons of 100 °F or 37.8 °C or hotter maxima, 74 afternoons of 90 °F or 32.2 °C or hotter maxima, eleven afternoons where the high does not rise above freezing, and seven mornings falling to or below 0 °F or −17.8 °C annually; the average window for freezing temperatures is September 16 to May 29. By far the coldest recorded month has been January 1949, with a mean of 4.6 °F (−15.2 °C) and a mean minimum of −12.0 °F (−24.4 °C) – between January 2 and February 3, the temperature did not reach freezing, whereas during the winter of 2011/2012 every single day topped freezing. The hottest month has been July 2013, with a mean of 79.9 °F (26.6 °C) and a mean maximum of 100.1 °F (37.8 °C), although July 2007's maximum was even hotter at 100.8 °F (38.2 °C).

With a period of record only dating back to 1944, extremes range from −39 °F (−39.4 °C) on December 22, 1990, up to 112 °F (44.4 °C) on July 12, 2002.

The mean seasonal snowfall of 19.1 inches or 0.49 meters on average occurs from November 25 to April 2, with half the annual snow falling during December and January alone. The snowiest season has been from July 1992 to June 1993, with a total of 53.2 inches or 1.4 meters, whereas only 2.2 inches or 0.056 meters fell from July 2014 to June 2015. Total seasonal precipitation has ranged from 15.87 inches or 403.1 millimeters between July 1997 and June 1998, down to only 2.97 inches or 75.4 millimeters between July 1958 and June 1959.

Climate data for Battle Mountain 4 SE, Nevada (1991–2020 normals, extremes 1944–present)
Month	Jan	Feb	Mar	Apr	May	Jun	Jul	Aug	Sep	Oct	Nov	Dec	Year
Record high °F (°C)	70 (21)	72 (22)	86 (30)	94 (34)	102 (39)	109 (43)	112 (44)	107 (42)	107 (42)	95 (35)	82 (28)	70 (21)	112 (44)
Mean daily maximum °F (°C)	46.2 (7.9)	51.9 (11.1)	61.8 (16.6)	67.8 (19.9)	78.2 (25.7)	89.5 (31.9)	99.5 (37.5)	97.6 (36.4)	87.4 (30.8)	73.1 (22.8)	56.8 (13.8)	45.9 (7.7)	71.3 (21.8)
Daily mean °F (°C)	34.2 (1.2)	39.1 (3.9)	46.5 (8.1)	51.7 (10.9)	60.8 (16.0)	69.7 (20.9)	78.0 (25.6)	75.6 (24.2)	66.0 (18.9)	53.7 (12.1)	42.0 (5.6)	34.0 (1.1)	54.3 (12.4)
Mean daily minimum °F (°C)	22.1 (−5.5)	26.3 (−3.2)	31.2 (−0.4)	35.7 (2.1)	43.5 (6.4)	49.9 (9.9)	56.4 (13.6)	53.5 (11.9)	44.7 (7.1)	34.4 (1.3)	27.2 (−2.7)	22.1 (−5.5)	37.3 (2.9)
Record low °F (°C)	−35 (−37)	−25 (−32)	−3 (−19)	5 (−15)	13 (−11)	24 (−4)	31 (−1)	28 (−2)	11 (−12)	3 (−16)	−9 (−23)	−39 (−39)	−39 (−39)
Average precipitation inches (mm)	0.98 (25)	0.78 (20)	0.91 (23)	1.12 (28)	1.44 (37)	0.65 (17)	0.20 (5.1)	0.29 (7.4)	0.47 (12)	0.56 (14)	0.77 (20)	1.02 (26)	9.19 (233)
Average snowfall inches (cm)	5.5 (14)	3.9 (9.9)	2.2 (5.6)	1.0 (2.5)	0.1 (0.25)	0.0 (0.0)	0.0 (0.0)	0.0 (0.0)	0.0 (0.0)	0.3 (0.76)	2.1 (5.3)	5.7 (14)	20.8 (53)
Average precipitation days (≥ 0.01 in)	7.4	7.2	7.6	7.5	7.8	4.2	2.0	2.1	3.2	3.8	6.0	7.2	66.0
Average snowy days (≥ 0.1 in)	3.1	2.5	1.7	0.6	0.1	0.0	0.0	0.0	0.0	0.1	1.7	2.9	12.7
Source: NOAA

== Demographics ==
Historical population
Census	Pop.	Note	%±
2020	3,705		—
U.S. Decennial Census

The 2020 census showed the Battle Mountain CDP to have a population of 3,705 people, up from 3,635 in 2010.

As of the census of 2000, there were 2,871 people, 1,053 households, and 731 families residing in the census-designated place (CDP) of Battle Mountain. The population density was 1,588.3 inhabitants per square mile (613.2/km^{2}). There were 1,455 housing units at an average density of 804.9 per square mile (310.8/km^{2}). The racial makeup of the CDP was 81.30% White, 0.14% African American, 2.54% Native American, 0.49% Asian, 0.03% Pacific Islander, 11.81% from other races, and 3.69% from two or more races. Hispanic or Latino of any race were 23.58% of the population.

There were 1,053 households, out of which 41.9% had children under the age of 18 living with them, 54.6% were married couples living together, 9.9% had a female householder with no husband present, and 30.5% were non-families. 25.2% of all households were made up of individuals, and 4.8% had someone living alone who was 65 years of age or older. The average household size was 2.71 and the average family size was 3.28.

In the CDP the population was spread out, with 33.8% under the age of 18, 8.1% from 18 to 24, 29.0% from 25 to 44, 22.4% from 45 to 64, and 6.7% who were 65 years of age or older. The median age was 32 years. For every 100 females, there were 104.1 males. For every 100 females age 18 and over, there were 104.4 males.

The median income for a household in the CDP was $42,981, and the median income for a family was $50,995. Males had a median income of $45,313 versus $25,417 for females. The per capita income for the CDP was $16,975. About 7.8% of families and 11.8% of the population were below the poverty line, including 14.1% of those under age 18 and 20.0% of those age 65 or over.

== Arts and culture ==
Battle Mountain has a public library, a branch of the Elko-Lander-Eureka County Library System.

== Sports ==
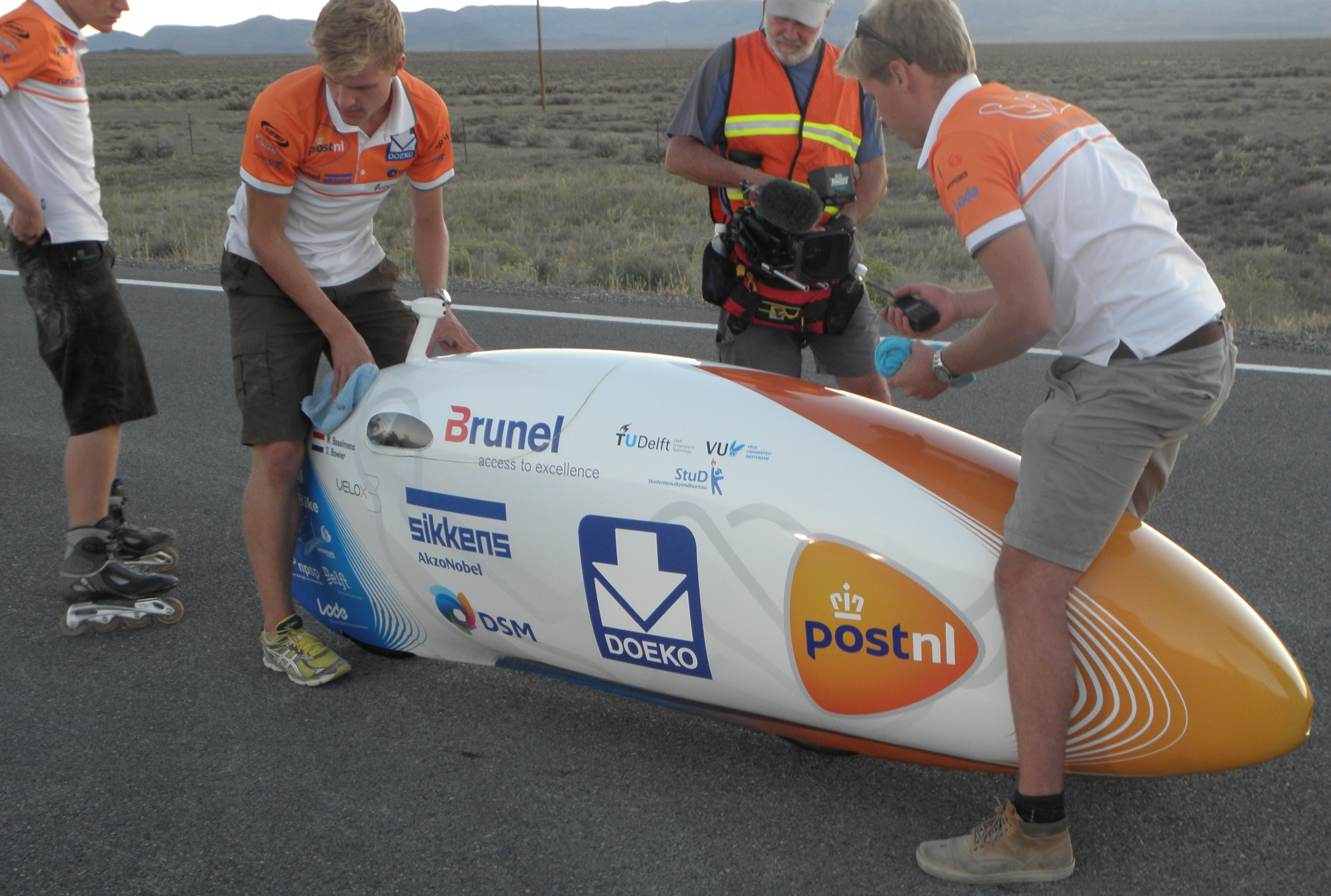
VeloX3 is prepared for a run during the 2013 World Human Powered Speed Challenge

Battle Mountain hosts an annual bike race on a long, straight, flat stretch of Highway 305 just outside town. The event draws teams from all over the world as they attempt to build and pedal the fastest bicycles on earth. The event is known as the "World Human Powered Speed Challenge".

On September 16, 2016, Todd Reichert became "the fastest man alive" by pedaling a streamlined bicycle at 89.59 mph (144.18 km/h) over a 200-metre (660 ft) distance at the end of a 5-mile (8.0 km) run. Reichert had an excellent week, setting five new records and smashing the previous 83.13 mph (133.78 km/h) record set by Sebastiaan Bowier on September 14, 2013. Previously, Sam Whittingham's record run in 2009 won the decimach prize for going one tenth the speed of sound (with adjustments for slope and elevation).

In 2019, Ilona Peltier, a French woman, became "the fastest woman alive" by setting the world woman's bicycle speed record at 78.61 mph (126.51 km/h).

Also annually held on the same stretch of road is the "Pony Express", an open road event from Battle Mountain to Austin and back. It is the longest open road race in the country, averaging a total of 130 miles (210 km). The race consists of vehicles ranging from 1960s-era muscle cars to the most modern sports cars.

== Education ==
Public education in Battle Mountain is administered by Lander County School District, which operates Battle Mountain High School.

== Infrastructure ==
=== Transportation ===
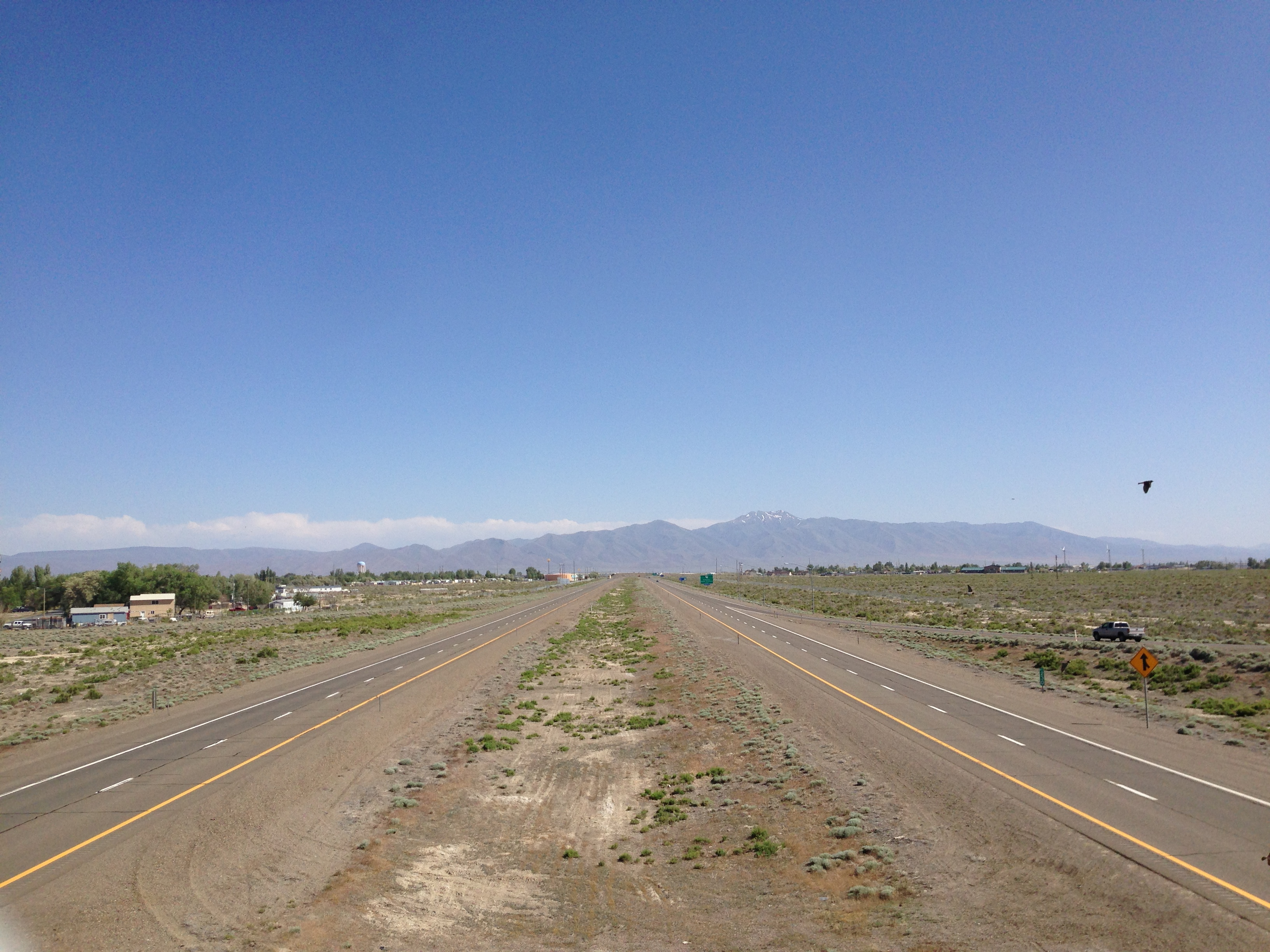
I-80 in Battle Mountain

Battle Mountain is located along Interstate 80, approximately halfway between Reno, and Salt Lake City, Utah.

Battle Mountain is the starting point of Nevada State Route 305, which heads southward to Austin.

The Union Pacific Railroad line runs through Battle Mountain with one daily Amtrak train, the California Zephyr which operates from the San Francisco Bay Area to Chicago via Reno and Salt Lake City, however, it speeds through Battle Mountain without stopping. The nearest location to board the train is Winnemucca - located approximately 53 miles to the west.

The historic narrow-gauge Nevada Central Railroad line ran from Battle Mountain to Austin, but has long been defunct.

Battle Mountain Airport (IATA: BAM, ICAO: KBAM, FAA LID: BAM), also known as Lander County Airport, is a public-use airport located 3 mi (4.8 km) southeast of the central business district of Battle Mountain. This general aviation airport is owned by Lander County and operated by the Battle Mountain Airport Authority.

== Notable people ==
- Joyce Collins, jazz pianist, singer, and educator
- Mary Dann and Carrie Dann, (Crescent Valley) Western Shoshone activists for cultural and spiritual rights and land rights
- James H. Ledlie, Union officer in the Civil War whom Ulysses S. Grant called "the greatest coward of the war"
- John Marvel, rancher and legislator
- Jeannette Walls, author

== National recognition ==
In December 2001, The Washington Post published an article by Gene Weingarten titled "Why Not The Worst?" that popularly titled Battle Mountain as the "Armpit of America". The town used the unofficial title as a publicity opportunity, and hosted an annual "Armpit Festival" from 2002 to 2005, which was sponsored by Old Spice and awarded deodorant-themed prizes to participants.

On January 2, 2009, The New York Times released an article titled "A Nevada Town Escapes the Slump, Thanks to Gold". The article regards the national economic depression and discusses Battle Mountain's economy.

== In popular culture ==
The name of the 2007 debut studio album Downtown Battle Mountain by American post-hardcore band Dance Gavin Dance was inspired by the town.
