= Lander County, Nevada =

County in Nevada, United States

- County
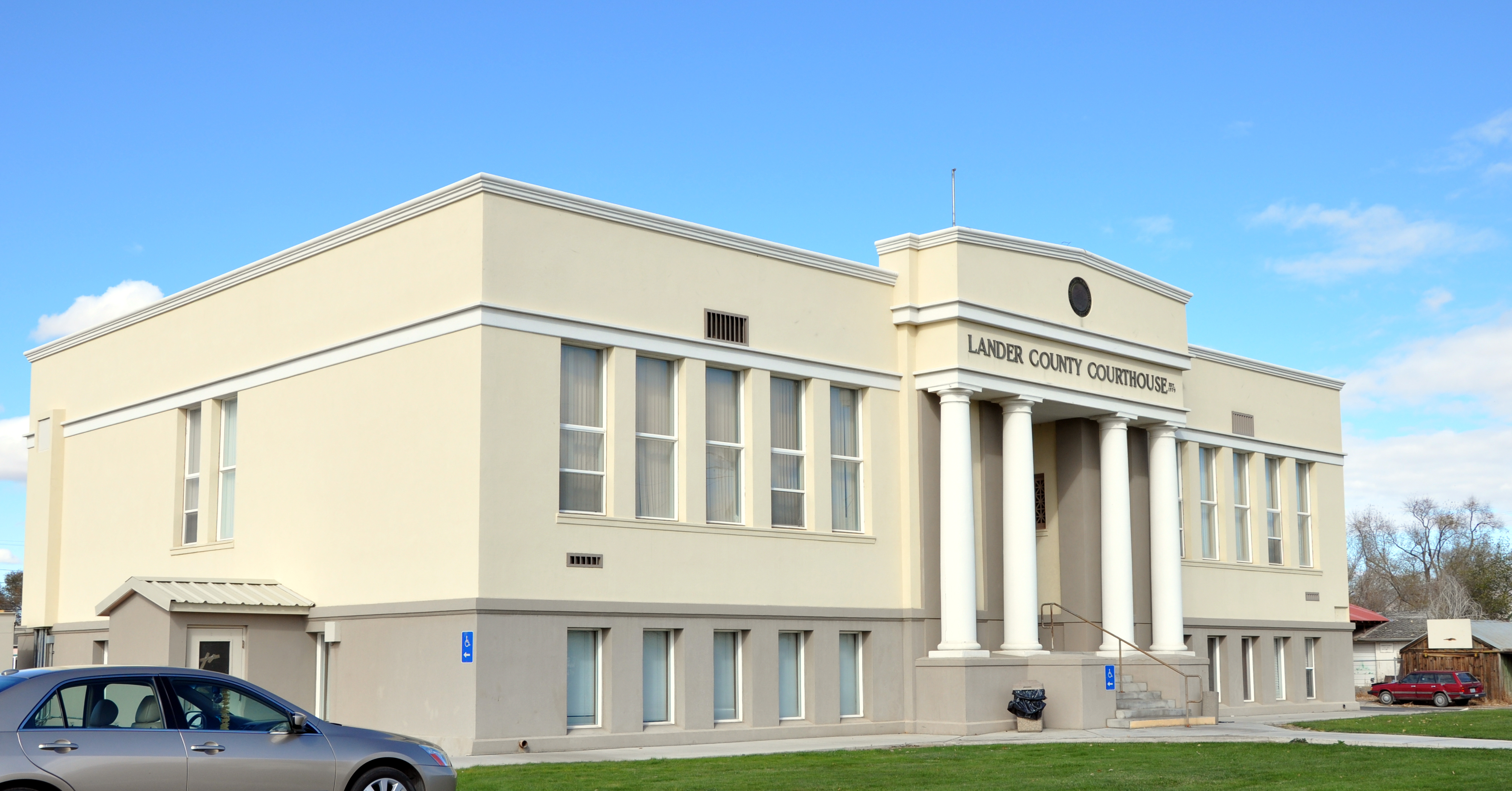
- Lander County Courthouse in Battle Mountain

- Flag

- Location within the U.S. state of Nevada
- Coordinates: 39°57′N 117°02′W
- Country: United States
- State: Nevada
- Founded: 1862; 164 years ago
- Named for: Frederick W. Lander
- Seat: Battle Mountain
- Largest community: Battle Mountain

Area
  - Total: 5,519 sq mi (14,290 km^{2})
  - Land: 5,490 sq mi (14,200 km^{2})
  - Water: 29 sq mi (75 km^{2}) 0.5%

Population (2020)
  - Total: 5,734
  - Estimate (2025): 5,872 ▲
  - Density: 1.04/sq mi (0.403/km^{2})
- Time zone: UTC−8 (Pacific)
  - Summer (DST): UTC−7 (PDT)
- Congressional district: 2nd
- Website: landercountynv.org

Lander County is a county in the U.S. state of Nevada. As of the 2020 census, the population was 5,734. Its county seat is Battle Mountain.

== History ==
The area that would become Lander County contained the Reese River Station of the Pony Express, and several mining settlements as part of the Reese River excitement.

On December 19, 1862, Lander County was created as part of the Nevada Territory from portions of Churchill County and Humboldt County, with Jacobs' Springs assigned as the temporary county seat until the role could be voted upon at the next general election. Lander County was named for General Frederick W. Lander, chief engineer of a federal wagon route and Special Indian Agent in the area. On September 2nd, 1863, Austin was voted as Lander County's new county seat. Lander County became known as "The Mother of Counties" due to the formation of 3 subsequent Nevadan counties from portions of its territory: Elko (1869), White Pine (1869), and Eureka (1873). On May 15, 1979, the voters of Lander County approved the move of the county seat from Austin to Battle Mountain in a special election. In a subsequent ruling, the Nevada Supreme Court affirmed this decision.

== Geography ==
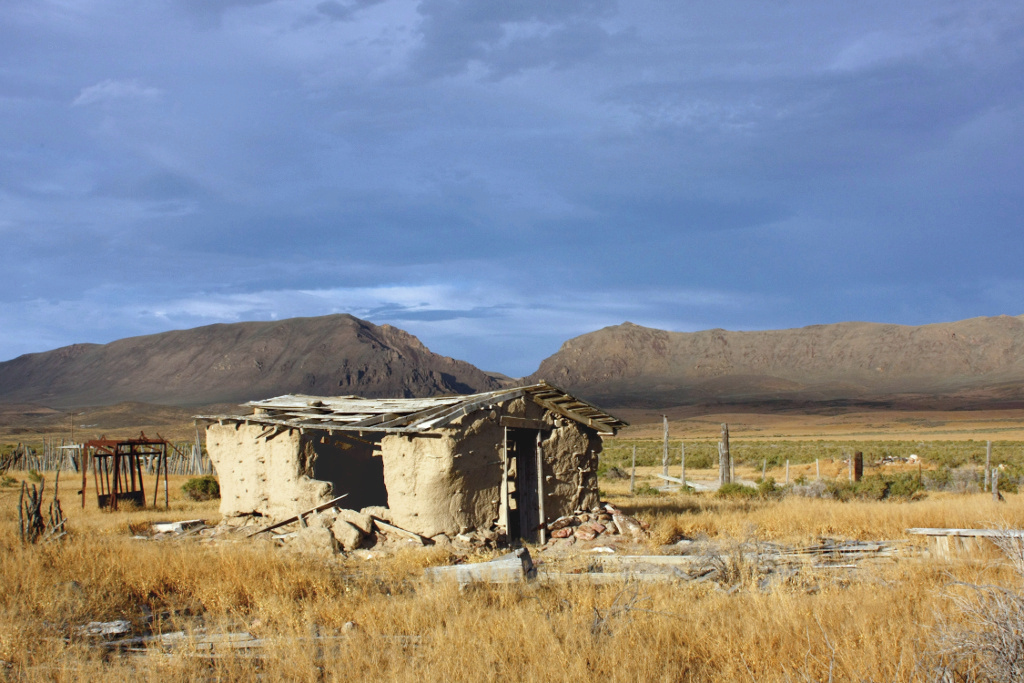
Derelict building off State Route 305 in the Reese River Valley with the Shoshone Range in the distance

According to the U.S. Census Bureau, the county has a total area of 5,519 square miles (14,290 km^{2}), of which 5,490 square miles (14,200 km^{2}) is land and 29 square miles (75 km^{2}) (0.5%) is water.

The 11,477 ft (3,498 m) summit of Bunker Hill, located in the Toiyabe Range near the Nye County border, is the highest point in the county; while the county's most topographically prominent peak is Mount Lewis.

=== Major highways ===
- Interstate 80
- Interstate 80 Business (Battle Mountain)
- U.S. Route 50
- State Route 304
- State Route 305
- State Route 306
- State Route 376
- State Route 722
- State Route 806

=== Adjacent counties ===
- Elko County - north
- Eureka County - east
- Nye County - south
- Churchill County - west
- Pershing County - west
- Humboldt County - northwest

=== National protected area ===
- Toiyabe National Forest (part)

== Demographics ==
Historical population
Census	Pop.	Note	%±
1870	2,815		—
1880	3,624		28.7%
1890	2,266		−37.5%
1900	1,534		−32.3%
1910	1,786		16.4%
1920	1,484		−16.9%
1930	1,714		15.5%
1940	1,745		1.8%
1950	1,850		6.0%
1960	1,566		−15.4%
1970	2,666		70.2%
1980	4,076		52.9%
1990	6,266		53.7%
2000	5,794		−7.5%
2010	5,775		−0.3%
2020	5,734		−0.7%
2025 (est.)	5,872	▲	2.4%
U.S. Decennial Census; 1790-1960 1900-1990; 1990-2000 2010-2020

=== Racial and ethnic composition ===
Lander County, Nevada – Racial and ethnic composition Note: the US Census treats Hispanic/Latino as an ethnic category. This table excludes Latinos from the racial categories and assigns them to a separate category. Hispanics/Latinos may be of any race.
Race / Ethnicity (NH = Non-Hispanic)	Pop 1980	Pop 1990	Pop 2000	Pop 2010	Pop 2020	% 1980	% 1990	% 2000	% 2010	% 2020
White alone (NH)	3,509	5,200	4,385	4,259	3,975	86.09%	82.99%	75.68%	73.75%	69.32%
Black or African American alone (NH)	4	9	10	17	7	0.10%	0.14%	0.17%	0.29%	0.12%
Native American or Alaska Native alone (NH)	132	248	216	197	206	3.24%	3.96%	3.73%	3.41%	3.59%
Asian alone (NH)	13	14	20	20	27	0.32%	0.22%	0.35%	0.35%	0.47%
Native Hawaiian or Pacific Islander alone (NH)	x	x	2	1	10	x	x	0.03%	0.02%	0.17%
Other race alone (NH)	6	6	7	0	19	0.15%	0.10%	0.12%	0.00%	0.33%
Mixed race or Multiracial (NH)	x	x	81	62	234	x	x	1.40%	1.07%	4.08%
Hispanic or Latino (any race)	412	789	1,073	1,219	1,256	10.11%	12.59%	18.52%	21.11%	21.90%
Total	4,076	6,266	5,794	5,775	5,734	100.00%	100.00%	100.00%	100.00%	100.00%

=== 2020 census ===
As of the 2020 census, the county had a population of 5,734. The median age was 38.7 years. 25.4% of residents were under the age of 18 and 15.7% were 65 years of age or older. For every 100 females there were 103.8 males, and for every 100 females age 18 and over there were 105.6 males. 0.0% of residents lived in urban areas, while 100.0% lived in rural areas.

The racial makeup of the county was 74.7% White, 0.2% Black or African American, 4.7% American Indian and Alaska Native, 0.5% Asian, 0.2% Native Hawaiian and Pacific Islander, 9.3% from some other race, and 10.5% from two or more races. Hispanic or Latino residents of any race comprised 21.9% of the population.

There were 2,292 households in the county, of which 34.2% had children under the age of 18 living with them and 19.0% had a female householder with no spouse or partner present. About 26.9% of all households were made up of individuals and 10.3% had someone living alone who was 65 years of age or older.

There were 2,798 housing units, of which 18.1% were vacant. Among occupied housing units, 74.4% were owner-occupied and 25.6% were renter-occupied. The homeowner vacancy rate was 3.0% and the rental vacancy rate was 21.1%.

=== 2010 census ===
At the 2010 census, there were 5,775 people, 2,213 households, and 1,545 families living in the county. The population density was 1.1 inhabitants per square mile (0.42/km^{2}). There were 2,575 housing units at an average density of 0.5 per square mile (0.19/km^{2}). The racial makeup of the county was 84.0% white, 4.2% American Indian, 0.4% Asian, 0.3% black or African American, 8.6% from other races, and 2.5% from two or more races. Those of Hispanic or Latino origin made up 21.1% of the population. In terms of ancestry, 19.4% were German, 13.6% were English, 12.2% were Irish, and 12.0% were American.

Of the 2,213 households, 37.1% had children under the age of 18 living with them, 54.5% were married couples living together, 9.4% had a female householder with no husband present, 30.2% were non-families, and 25.6% of households were made up of individuals. The average household size was 2.60 and the average family size was 3.14. The median age was 37.1 years.

The median household income was $66,525 and the median family income was $67,157. Males had a median income of $62,932 versus $33,056 for females. The per capita income for the county was $25,287. About 11.7% of families and 12.2% of the population were below the poverty line, including 17.0% of those under age 18 and 7.4% of those age 65 or over.

=== 2000 census ===
At the 2000 census, there were 5,794 people, 2,093 households, and 1,523 families living in the county. The population density was 1 person per square mile (0.39 person/km^{2}). There were 2,780 housing units at an average density of 0 units per square mile (0/km^{2}). The racial makeup of the county was 84.41% White, 0.21% Black or African American, 3.99% Native American, 0.35% Asian, 0.03% Pacific Islander, 8.66% from other races, and 2.35% from two or more races. 18.52% of the population were Hispanic or Latino of any race. Of the 2,093 households 39.70% had children under the age of 18 living with them, 59.70% were married couples living together, 8.10% had a female householder with no husband present, and 27.20% were non-families. 22.30% of households were one person and 5.00% were one person aged 65 or older. The average household size was 2.73 and the average family size was 3.23.

The age distribution was 32.20% under the age of 18, 6.80% from 18 to 24, 29.00% from 25 to 44, 25.00% from 45 to 64, and 7.00% 65 or older. The median age was 34 years. For every 100 females there were 105.50 males. For every 100 females age 18 and over, there were 105.50 males.

The median household income was $46,067 and the median family income was $51,538. Males had a median income of $45,375 versus $22,197 for females. The per capita income for the county was $16,998. About 8.60% of families and 12.50% of the population were below the poverty line, including 13.50% of those under age 18 and 12.90% of those age 65 or over.

== Politics ==
Lander County one of the fifteen solid Republican counties in Nevada, as described by Ballotpedia.

United States presidential election results for Lander County, Nevada
Year	Republican		Democratic		Third party(ies)	
Year	No.	%	No.	%	No.	%
1904	227	61.85%	93	25.34%	47	12.81%
1908	257	44.77%	276	48.08%	41	7.14%
1912	68	13.13%	197	38.03%	253	48.84%
1916	321	34.48%	473	50.81%	137	14.72%
1920	416	58.67%	254	35.83%	39	5.50%
1924	254	46.61%	138	25.32%	153	28.07%
1928	456	59.22%	314	40.78%	0	0.00%
1932	272	33.66%	536	66.34%	0	0.00%
1936	237	28.83%	585	71.17%	0	0.00%
1940	393	45.28%	475	54.72%	0	0.00%
1944	425	52.60%	383	47.40%	0	0.00%
1948	397	56.39%	298	42.33%	9	1.28%
1952	501	67.89%	237	32.11%	0	0.00%
1956	540	65.61%	283	34.39%	0	0.00%
1960	383	49.48%	391	50.52%	0	0.00%
1964	338	46.36%	391	53.64%	0	0.00%
1968	461	50.72%	301	33.11%	147	16.17%
1972	798	63.03%	468	36.97%	0	0.00%
1976	561	49.96%	518	46.13%	44	3.92%
1980	935	65.61%	361	25.33%	129	9.05%
1984	1,222	78.28%	301	19.28%	38	2.43%
1988	1,214	70.83%	439	25.61%	61	3.56%
1992	885	44.43%	423	21.23%	684	34.34%
1996	1,107	49.98%	660	29.80%	448	20.23%
2000	1,619	76.40%	395	18.64%	105	4.96%
2004	1,602	78.03%	414	20.17%	37	1.80%
2008	1,466	69.74%	577	27.45%	59	2.81%
2012	1,580	72.98%	534	24.67%	51	2.36%
2016	1,828	75.76%	403	16.70%	182	7.54%
2020	2,198	79.49%	496	17.94%	71	2.57%
2024	2,180	80.00%	482	17.69%	63	2.31%

United States Senate election results for Lander County, Nevada1
Year	Republican		Democratic		Third party(ies)	
Year	No.	%	No.	%	No.	%
2024	1,924	70.97%	538	19.85%	249	9.18%

== Communities ==
Lander County has no incorporated communities. The following places are located in Lander County:

=== Census-designated places ===
- Austin
- Battle Mountain (county seat)
- Kingston

=== Unincorporated community ===
- Pittsburg

=== Ghost towns ===
- Clifton
- Galena

== See also ==
- National Register of Historic Places listings in Lander County, Nevada
