= Hole in the Mountain Peak =

Mountain in Nevada, United States

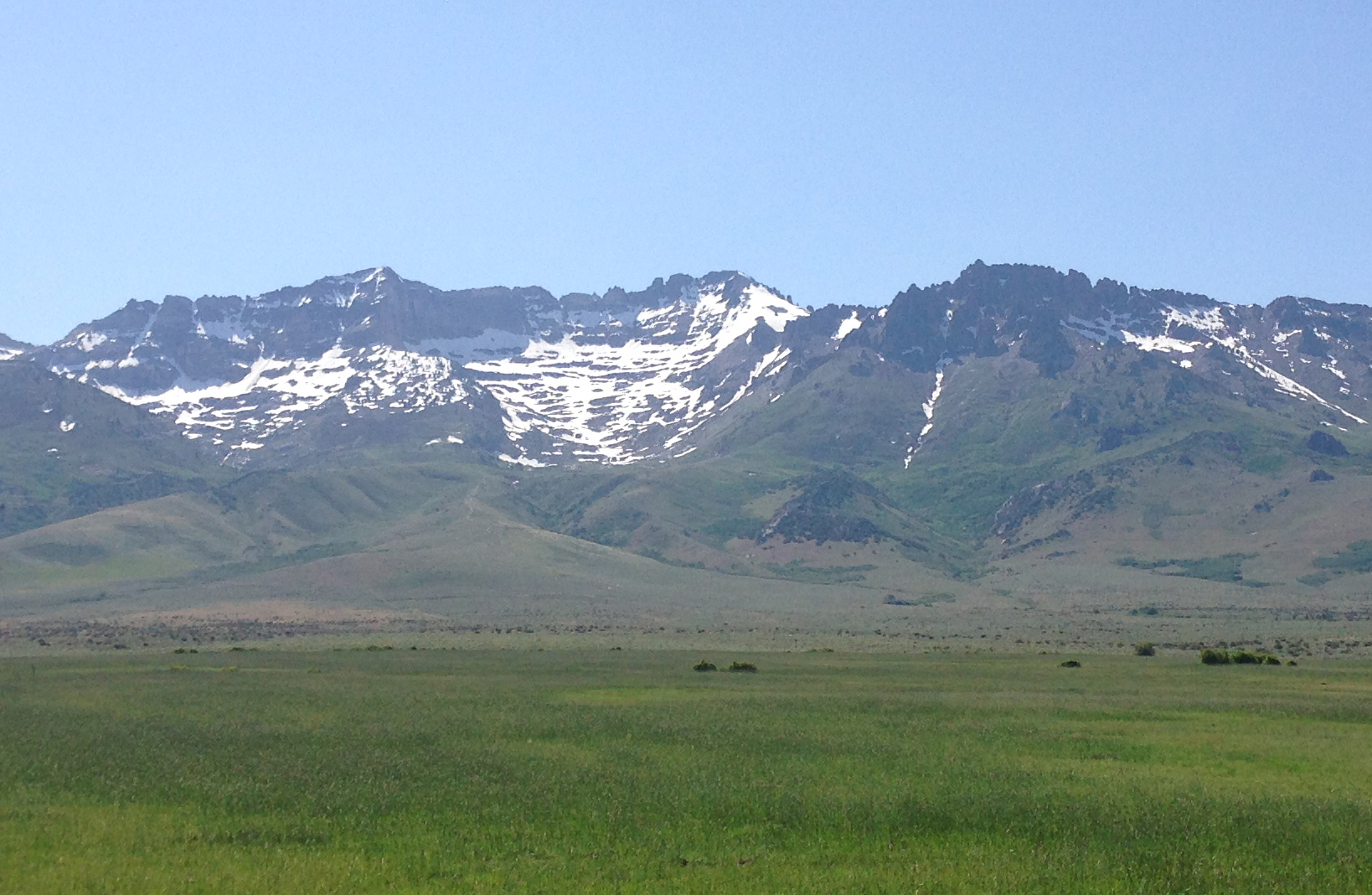
- Hole in the Mountain Peak (center) from Clover Valley

Highest point
- Elevation: 11,311 ft (3,448 m) NAVD 88
- Prominence: 4,849 ft (1,478 m)
- Isolation: 26.59 mi (42.79 km)
- Listing: USA Lower 48 Top 400 Peaks by Prominence #61; Great Basin Peaks List #22; Great Basin Peaks List #22; Nevada Peaks with 25 Miles of Isolation #39; Great Basin Peaks Section List
- Coordinates: 40°57′03″N 115°07′21″W

Geography
- Location within Nevada
- Location: Elko County, Nevada, U.S.
- Parent range: East Humboldt Range
- Topo map: USGS Humboldt Peak

Climbing
- Easiest route: From Lizzie's Basin, west up an avalanche chute and then along the ridgeline, Class 2 Scramble

Hole in the Mountain Peak is the highest mountain in the East Humboldt Range in Elko County, Nevada, United States. It is the thirty-fifth highest mountain in the state, and also ranks as the eleventh-most topographically prominent peak in the state. It is located within the East Humboldt Wilderness of the Humboldt–Toiyabe National Forest and is 11,311 feet (3,448 m) high. The peak is 35 miles (56 km) east of Elko and 14 miles (23 km) southwest of Wells, making it a rather prominent feature of the drive along Interstate 80 in Elko County. The U.S. Board on Geographic Names lists two variant names, Mount Bonpland and Mount Bonplant.

== Name ==
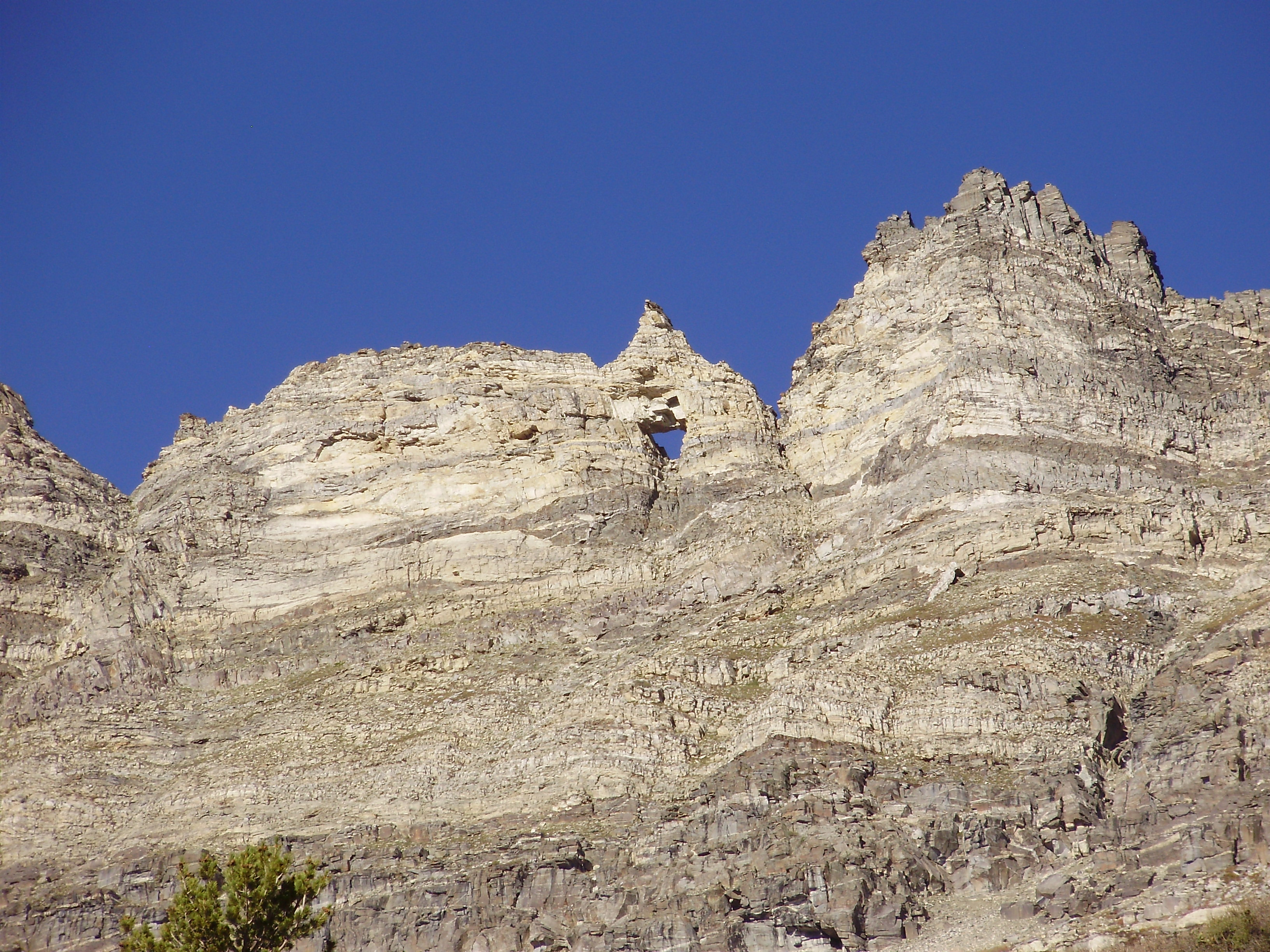
Lizzie's Window, viewed from Lizzie's Basin

The mountain is named after an arch, named Hole in the Mountain, which is in the ridge about one-third of a mile (0.5 km) south of the summit at about 11,127 feet (3,392 m). The arch is also known as Lizzie's Window.

== Ascending ==
Hiking or climbing to the arch or to the peak can be attempted from either Starr Valley on the west side or from Clover Valley on the east side. Climbing to the window from Starr Valley is the easier of the two if approached from the basin right below the window. However, the route to the basin is long, generally unmarked, and is best accomplished on horseback with an outfitter in the area. After reaching the basin the round trip to the window can usually be accomplished within two hours.

Climbing to the arch from Clover Valley is considerably more difficult, but the window is constantly in view and much closer, which may give the difficulty factor a deceptive appearance. However, with an appropriate high-clearance 4WD vehicle, the hiking distance before starting the climb is much less than the hiking distance when starting from Starr Valley.

Clover Valley is reached by driving south from Wells on US Highway 93 and 5 miles (8 km) later turning onto State Route 232 to Clover Valley. Six miles (9.7 km), later look for the Week's Creek Canyon turnoff sign on the right. This is a public access road that will lead to Lizzie's Basin and farther into the mountain towards Hole in the Mountain basin. There is no established trail to reach the window. The direct routes to the window are considered difficult and dangerous; it is easier to first ascending the Hole in the Mountain Peak, before approaching the arch.

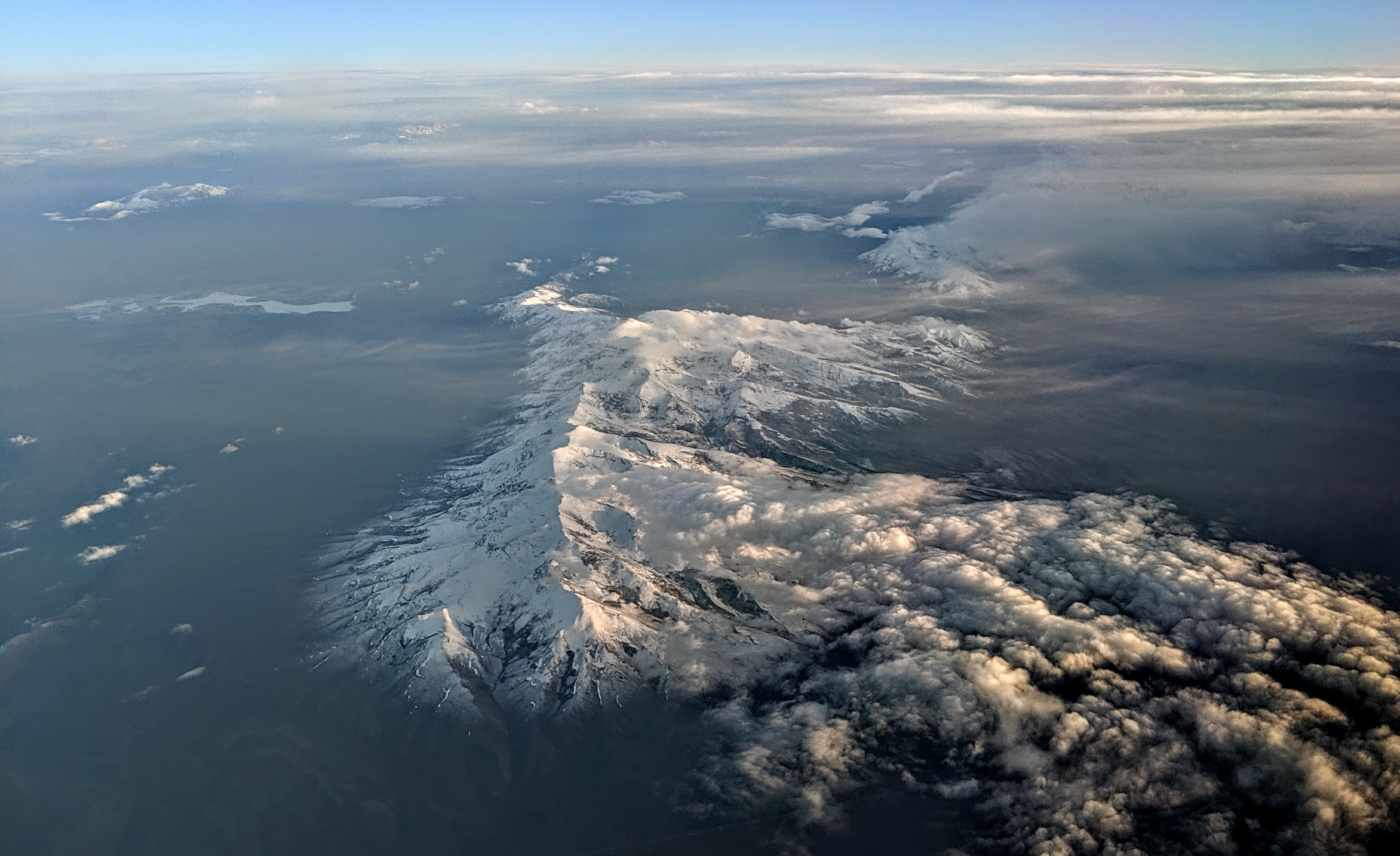
Aerial view of Hole in the Mountain Peak and Humboldt Peak

== Climate ==
There is no weather station at the summit, but this climate table contains interpolated data for an area around the summit. Hole in the Mountain Peak has a (subalpine climate (Köppen Dfc).

Climate data for Hole in the Mountain Peak 40.9430 N, 115.1230 W, Elevation: 10,735 ft (3,272 m) (1991–2020 normals)
Month	Jan	Feb	Mar	Apr	May	Jun	Jul	Aug	Sep	Oct	Nov	Dec	Year
Mean daily maximum °F (°C)	27.3 (−2.6)	26.7 (−2.9)	31.2 (−0.4)	34.4 (1.3)	44.1 (6.7)	55.4 (13.0)	66.2 (19.0)	65.2 (18.4)	56.2 (13.4)	43.4 (6.3)	32.8 (0.4)	26.5 (−3.1)	42.4 (5.8)
Daily mean °F (°C)	19.1 (−7.2)	17.9 (−7.8)	21.4 (−5.9)	24.7 (−4.1)	33.7 (0.9)	43.9 (6.6)	53.7 (12.1)	52.7 (11.5)	44.4 (6.9)	33.5 (0.8)	24.4 (−4.2)	18.5 (−7.5)	32.3 (0.2)
Mean daily minimum °F (°C)	10.9 (−11.7)	9.1 (−12.7)	11.5 (−11.4)	15.0 (−9.4)	23.4 (−4.8)	32.5 (0.3)	41.2 (5.1)	40.3 (4.6)	32.6 (0.3)	23.7 (−4.6)	16.0 (−8.9)	10.6 (−11.9)	22.2 (−5.4)
Average precipitation inches (mm)	6.86 (174)	4.50 (114)	4.90 (124)	5.01 (127)	4.81 (122)	2.28 (58)	0.91 (23)	0.80 (20)	1.81 (46)	3.29 (84)	5.02 (128)	6.81 (173)	47 (1,193)
Source: PRISM Climate Group

== Summit panorama ==
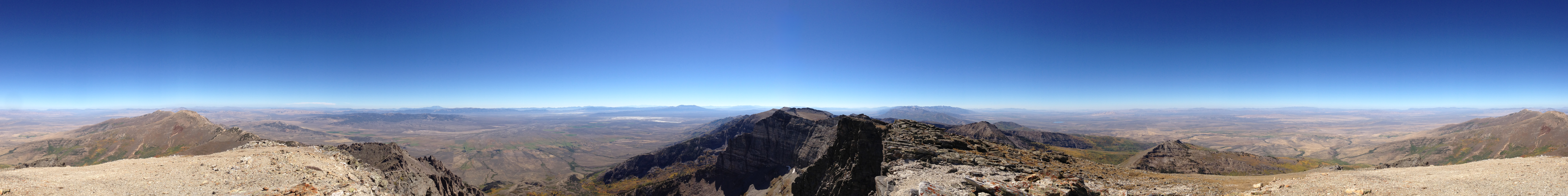
360-degree panorama from the summit of Hole in the Mountain Peak, Nevada
