= Nevada State Route 232 =

State highway in Nevada, United States

State Route 232
- Clover Valley Road

Route information
- Maintained by NDOT
- Length: 14.531 mi (23.385 km)
- Existed: 1976–present

Major junctions
- South end: 5 miles south of Steeles Creek
- North end: US 93 south of Wells

Location
- Country: United States
- State: Nevada

Highway system
- Nevada State Highway System; Interstate; US; State; Pre‑1976; Scenic
← SR 231	→ SR 233

State Route 232 (SR 232) is a state highway in Elko County, Nevada. It covers the majority of Clover Valley Road south of Wells.

== Route description ==
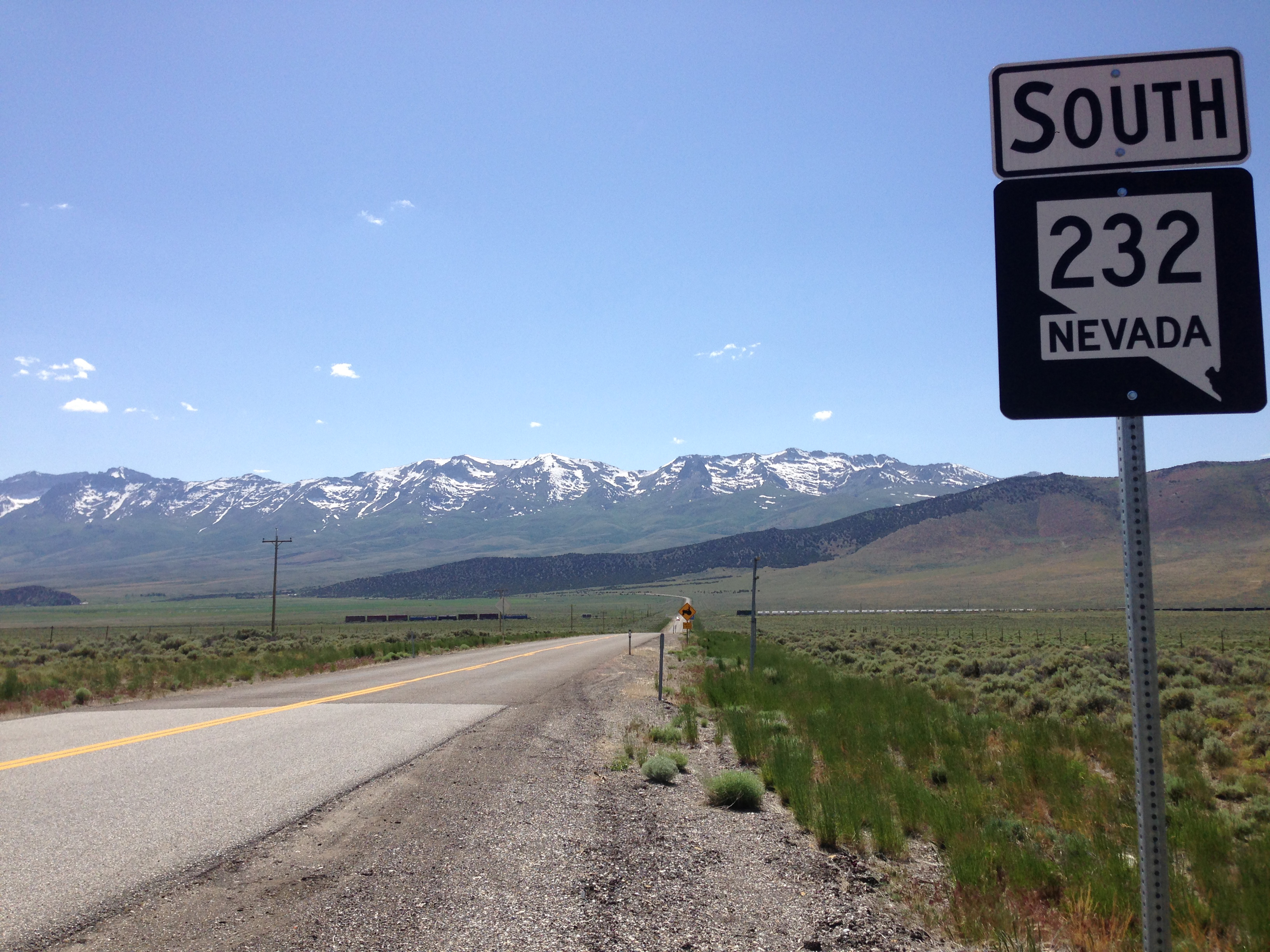
View south along SR 232 from its northern terminus at US 93

State Route 232 begins in the Clover Valley on Clover Valley Road about five miles (8.0 km) south of Steeles Creek, at the north end of Elko County Route 782. From there, the route travels northward through the desert valley, somewhat paralleling U.S. Route 93 (US 93) to the east, as it traverses near the base of the East Humboldt Range. SR 232 serves a number of ranches and crosses several creeks as it treks northward through Clover Valley. After rounding the east side of Signal Hill, the highway turns eastward. The route comes to an end at a junction with US 93 about 5.5 miles (8.9 km) south of Wells.

== History ==
SR 232 was designated on July 1, 1976.

== Major intersections ==
The entire route is in Elko County.

Location	mi	km	Destinations	Notes
	0.00	0.00	Clover Valley Road (to US 93)	Continues south as CR 782
	14.53	23.38	US 93 – Wells, Ely	Northern terminus
1.000 mi = 1.609 km; 1.000 km = 0.621 mi
