= Humboldt Peak (Nevada) =

Mountain in Nevada, United States

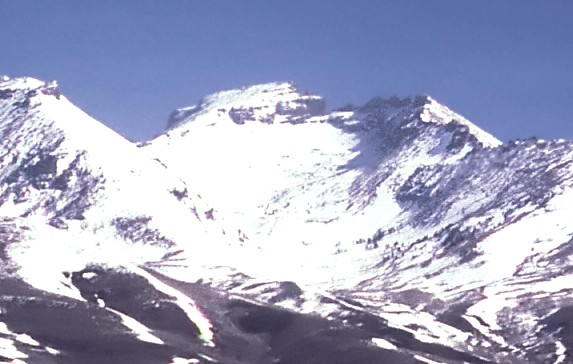
- Humboldt Peak, looking north

Highest point
- Elevation: 11,025 ft (3,360 m) NAVD 88
- Prominence: 860 ft (262 m)
- Coordinates: 40°54′05″N 115°07′11″W

Geography
- Location within Nevada
- Location: Elko County, Nevada, U.S.
- Parent range: East Humboldt Range
- Topo map: USGS Humboldt Peak

Climbing
- Easiest route: From ridge above Steele Lake: Hike & Scramble

Humboldt Peak is the southernmost high summit in the East Humboldt Range of Elko County in northeastern Nevada. To the west are First and Second Boulder Canyons, to the south is Pole Canyon and Secret Pass, and to the east is the South Fork of Steele Creek and Clover Valley. The summit is the end of a high crest running almost 10 miles (16 km) to the north, and the beginning of a slow descent to Ruby Valley to the southeast. The summit, the fourth highest peak in the range, is located about 16 miles (26 km) southwest of the community of Wells. The mountain is in the East Humboldt Wilderness and Humboldt National Forest.
