= Wells High School (Wells, Nevada) =

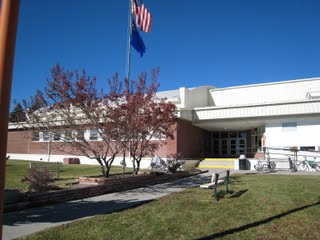
- Wells High School

Location
- 1129 Lake Avenue; Wells, NV 89835; United States; 41.108°N 114.970°W

Information
- Type: Public High School
- Established: 1914
- School district: Elko County School District
- Superintendent: Clayton Anderson
- School number: (775) 752-3477
- Principal: Kenneth Higbee
- Teaching staff: 14.00 (on full-time equivalent (FTE) basis)
- Grades: 9–12
- Enrollment: 99 (2023-2024)
- Student to teacher ratio: 7.07
- Colors: Black and orange
- Fight song: For All Wells High We Stand (to the tune of Anchors Aweigh)
- Athletics conference: Northern Nevada 1A Region
- Mascot: Leopard
- Yearbook: El Charco
- Website: wells.ecsdnv.net

Wells High School is a public school located in Wells, Nevada, United States. It has an enrollment of 118 students in grades 9 through 12. The school primarily serves students from Wells, as well as a number of students from Clover Valley, Metropolis, Montello, Oasis, and Deeth. Wells High School made AYP in 2010. Under No Child Left Behind, a school makes Adequate Yearly Progress (AYP) if it achieves the minimum levels of improvement determined by the state of Nevada in terms of student performance and other accountability measures.

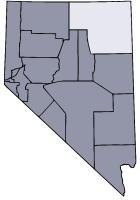
Elko County, Nevada highlighted.

== History ==
Wells High School was established in 1914 and suffered extensive damage in 2008 when a 6.0 earthquake hit Wells, Nevada.

Wells High School's gymnasium and auditorium building had significant damage from the shaking. It required $2.478 million worth of work that was completed by the beginning of the 2008/2009 school year (about 6 months). This project was achieved and the building was indeed ready for use by the beginning of the school year. Earthquake damage was repaired in an up-to-code fashion, but only those damaged elements that were damaged were repaired. Thus, the building was partially seismically strengthened.

== Extracurricular activities ==
=== Athletics ===
The Leopards compete in the Northern Nevada 1A Region. Over the years, they have competed in different athletic conferences ranging from 1B to 2A, in which they won several state championships.

==== Nevada 2A state championships ====
- Football: 2000 & 2004
- Boys Cross Country: 1999, 2000, 2001
- Girl Cross Country: 1997
- Girls Golf: 2003, 2004, 2018

==== Nevada 1A state championships ====
- Boys Basketball: 1995
- Boys Track: 1981
- Girls Track: 1994, 2009, 2010, 2011, 2018
- Baseball: 2002, 2003 & 2005
- Softball: 2001, 2003, 2004

==== Nevada 1B state championships ====
- Boys Basketball: 1947
- Girls Basketball: 1986 & 1989
- Boys Track: 1987, 1988 & 1989
- Girls Track: 1987, 1988 & 1989

==== Nevada Interscholastic Activities Association ====
- NIAA Award of Excellence: 2004-2005
