= Angel Lake =

Lake in Nevada, United States

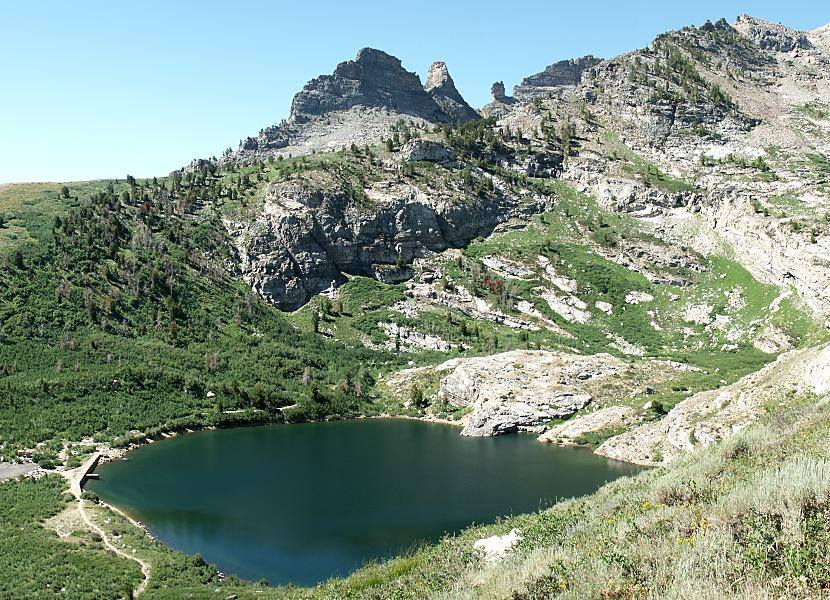

- Location in Nevada
- Location: East Humboldt Range, Elko County, Nevada
- Coordinates: 41°01′36″N 115°05′06″W
- Type: tarn
- Basin countries: United States
- Surface area: 13 acres (5.3 ha)
- Max. depth: 29 ft (8.8 m)
- Surface elevation: 8,378 ft (2,554 m)

Angel Lake is a glacial tarn in the northern part of the East Humboldt Range, in central Elko County in the northeastern part of the state of Nevada. It is located at approximately 41°01.6′N 115°05.1′W, and at an elevation of 8,378 feet (2,554 m). It has an area of approximately 13 acres (5.3 hectares), and a depth of up to 29 feet (8.8 m). A 12-mile (19 km) scenic highway, State Route 231, climbs from Interstate 80's exit 351 in Wells to the eastern shore of the lake.

Located at the base of a steep cirque, the lake is surrounded by high cliffs. Greys Peak (10,674 ft; 3,253 m) rises high to the west, and to the south is a group of pinnacles known as Chimney Rock. Far below and to the east lies Clover Valley and the community of Wells.

Angel Lake is one of the most popular recreation sites in the area. On its shore is a 26-site campground, and an 11-site picnic area. The lake itself is available for fishing and non-motorized rafts. A paved trailhead provides access for routes to nearby Smith Lake and to the more distant Greys Lake. Down the access road can be found a trailhead for Winchell Lake, and the Angel Creek Campground.

The lake was named after Warren M. Angel, an early rancher in nearby Clover Valley.
