= Halloway massacre =

Mass murder of American pioneers

Halloway Massacre
- Location: near Wells, Humboldt River, Nevada
- Date: August 13, 1857
- Attack type: mass murder
- Deaths: 6
- Injuries: 3
- Victim: American settlers
- Perpetrator: Paiute warriors*

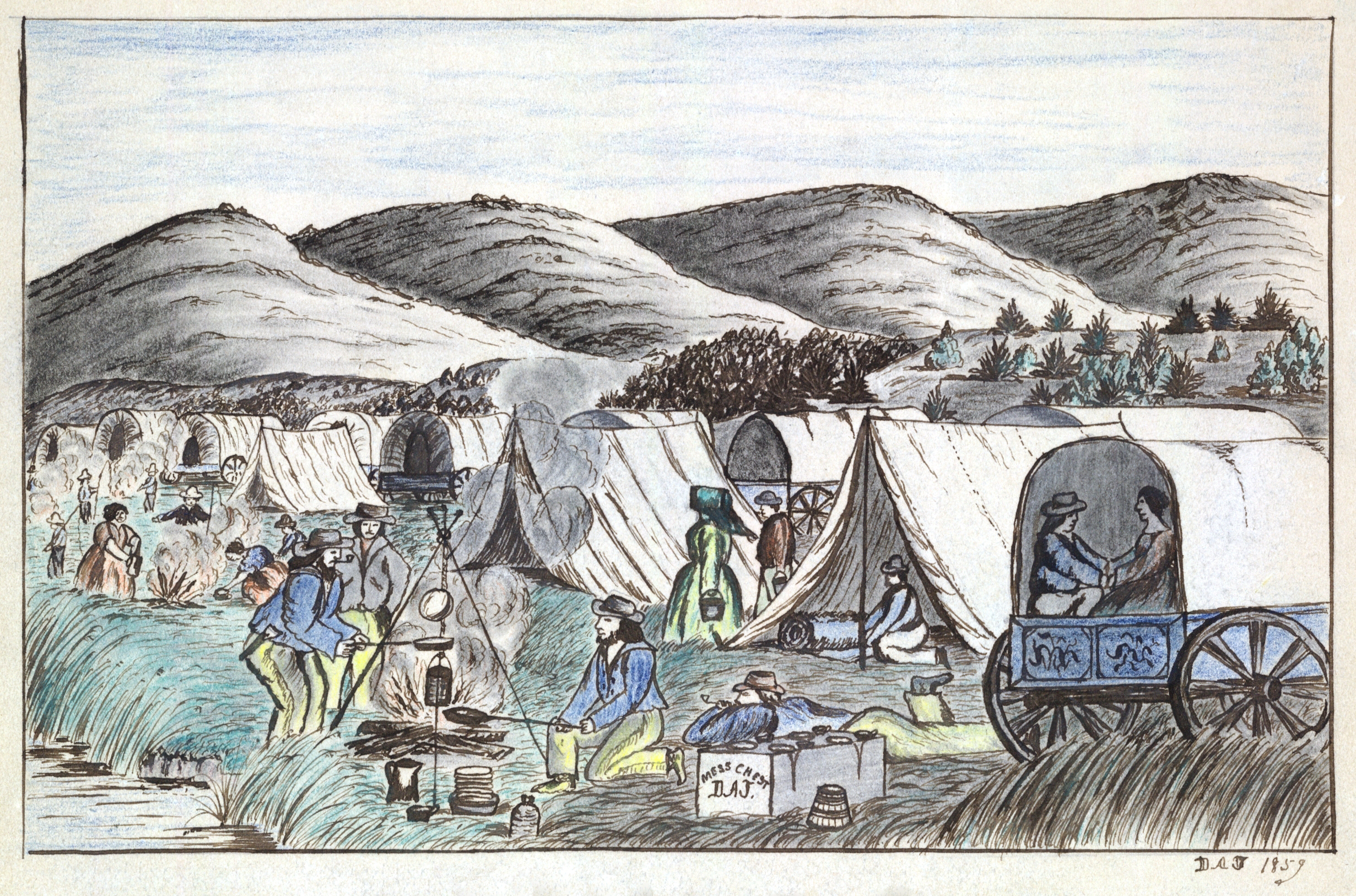
A wagon train on the Humboldt River in 1859.

The Halloway incident (August 13, 1857) was an attack by presumed Northern Paiute on a wagon train of settlers travelling to the newly formed U.S. state of California. It occurred near the head of the Humboldt River and present day Wells, Nevada.

== Narrative ==
A man named Mr. Halloway led the group which consisted of only a few wagons and nine other people, including his family. Another wagon train followed behind the Halloway's though they were too far away to help when the natives attacked. It was dawn on the morning of August 13 when warriors quickly rode in on horseback and began killing the settlers with arrows and gunfire. "Mr. Halloway was killed right away with two men and his infant child.. Mrs. Halloway was also shot twice, slightly wounding her. She concluded that she would act the possum, and let on to be. She laid still. The Indians came to her, stripped her naked, and commenced what before had not been anticipated. She said then he then lain her on the ground and she immediately felt the edge of the scalping knife, and in an instant the scalp was torn from her head. After the Indians had retired a short distance, they notice her move some little, when they returned, stomped her with their feet, and pierced her with arrows until they were satisfied that she was dead. She was taken up by another train, brought into the state, and last account was recovering. The cattle were also recovered and in pursuit of Mrs. Holloway's scalp was picked up by one of the party and now in her possession.". Their two-year-old daughter was killed when one of the warriors swung her by the heels into a wagon wheel. Three of the men in the party, two of whom were wounded, escaped and made it to the other wagon train and when it came up the natives scattered into the countryside, leaving behind Mrs. Halloway who survived, and six dead. The scalp of Mrs. Halloway was retrieved and reattached, she lived for several years more but eventually became insane.

== Bibliography ==
- Michno, Gregory (2003). Encyclopedia of Indian wars: western battles and skirmishes, 1850-1890. Mountain Press Publishing. ISBN 0-87842-468-7.
