= Greys Peak =

Mountain in Nevada, United States

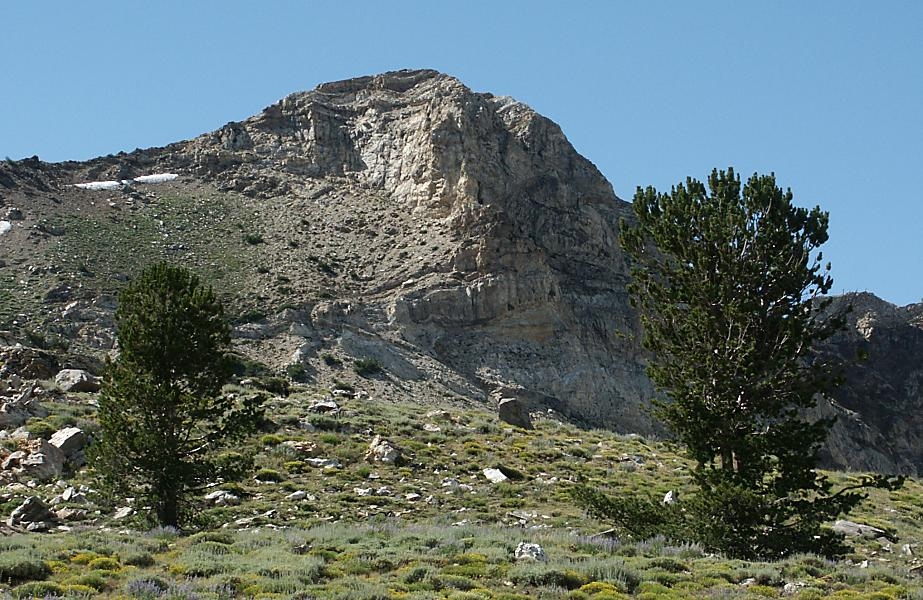
- Greys Peak, looking northwest

Highest point
- Elevation: 10,676 ft (3,254 m) NAVD 88
- Prominence: 714 ft (218 m)
- Coordinates: 41°01′26″N 115°06′17″W

Geography
- Location within Nevada
- Location: Elko County, Nevada, U.S.
- Parent range: East Humboldt Range
- Topo map: USGS Welcome

Climbing
- Easiest route: Scramble, class 2

Greys Peak is the northernmost summit of the East Humboldt Range of Elko County in northeastern Nevada about 10 miles (16 km) southwest of the community of Wells. It rises over 5,000 feet (1,500 m) from the Humboldt Valley, making it one of the most visually prominent peaks in the area. To the west are Dennis Flats, Starr Valley, and remote Greys Lake, while to the east are Chimney Rock, Clover Valley, and popular Angel Lake. The summit is the start of a high crest running almost 10 miles (16 km) to the south.

The peak is named after Enoch Grey, an early homesteader in nearby Starr Valley.

== Climbing ==
The most common approach starts at the Angel Lake Campground on the mountains eastern flank. A primitive trail, (class 2), climbs about 2,300 feet (700 m) from the parking lot.
