= Nevada State Route 223 =

Highway in Nevada

State Route 223
- Interstate 80 Business; Humboldt Avenue & Sixth Street
- Nevada State Route 223, highlighted in red

Route information
- Maintained by NDOT
- Length: 2.010 mi (3.235 km)
- Existed: 1976–present

Major junctions
- West end: SR 231 in Wells
- East end: US 93 in Wells

Location
- Country: United States
- State: Nevada

Highway system
- Interstate Highway System; Main; Auxiliary; Suffixed; Business; Future; Nevada State Highway System; Interstate; US; State; Pre‑1976; Scenic
← SR 221	→ SR 224

State Route 223 (SR 223) is a state highway in Elko County, Nevada, United States. Co-signed with Interstate 80 Business (I-80 Bus.), it serves the town of Wells.

== Route description ==
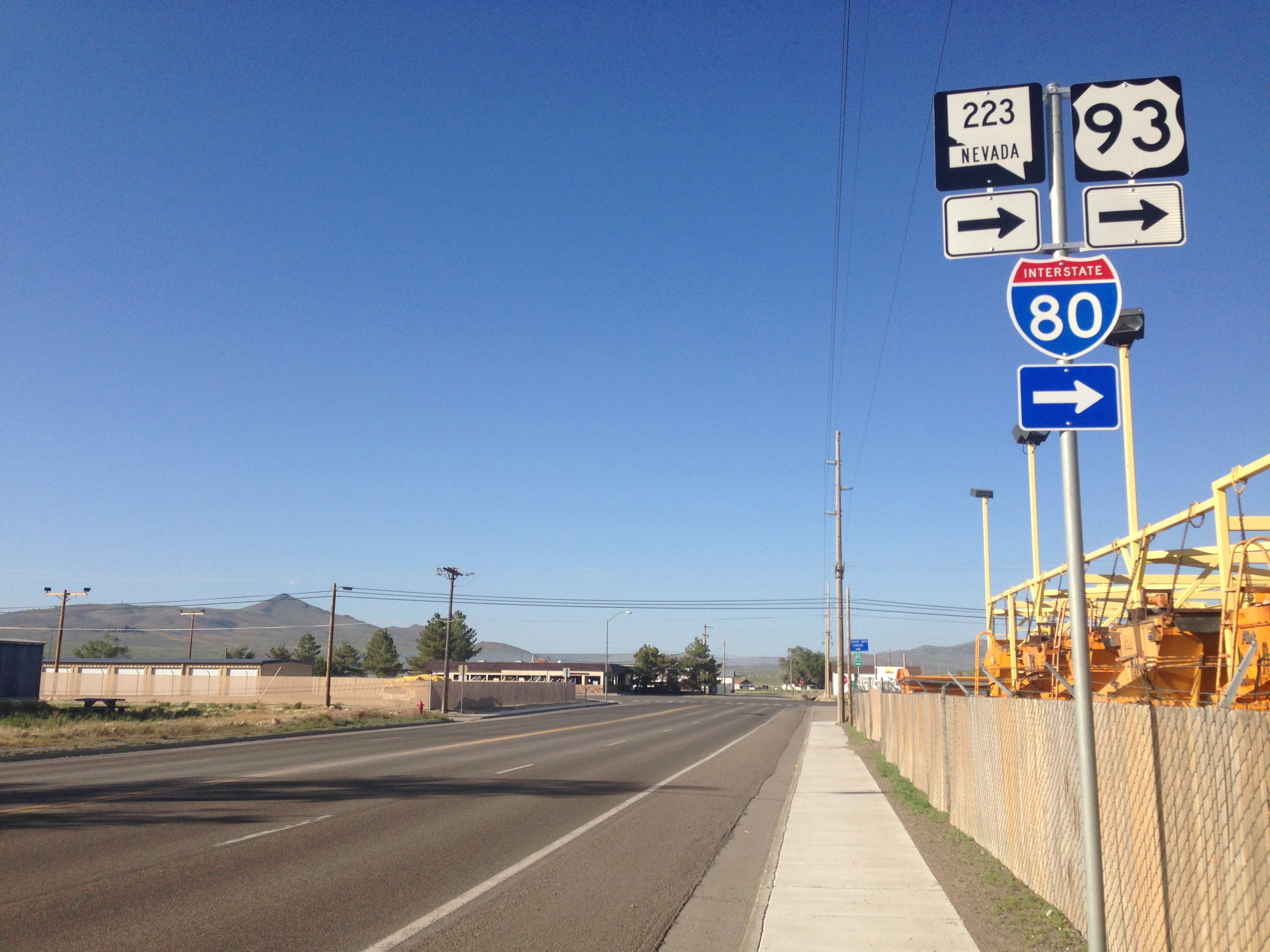
View eastbound along SR 223 (Humboldt Avenue) near its right turn onto Sixth Street

State Route 223 begins at the intersection of Humboldt Avenue and Angel Lake Road (SR 231) in western Wells. From there, the highway follows Humboldt Avenue northward, crossing underneath Interstate 80 (I-80), curving easterly as the road borders residential areas of the town. After about 0.9 miles (1.4 km), Humboldt Avenue intersects Sixth Street. SR 223 turns southeasterly to follow Sixth Street for about 1.1 miles (1.8 km) before reaching its terminus at the intersection with U.S. Route 93.

Sixth Street continues east to intersect a westbound off ramp from I-80, which completes the I-80 Bus. Loop.

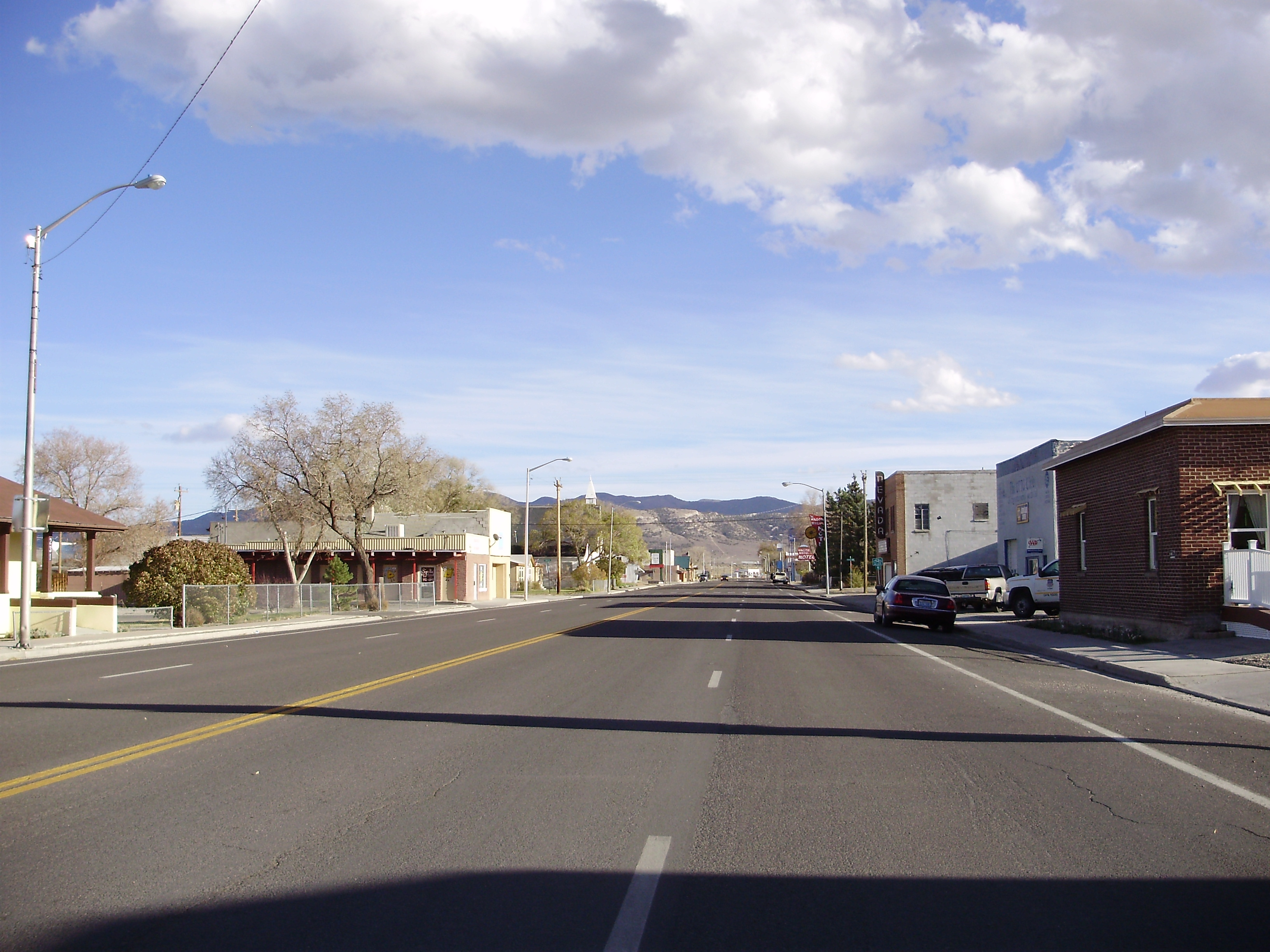
SR 223 in downtown Wells

== History ==
Prior to 1976, the portion of SR 223 along Sixth Street was part of old State Route 1 and U.S. Route 40.

== Major intersections ==
The entire route is in Wells, Elko County.

mi	km	Destinations	Notes
0.00	0.00	SR 231 (Angel Lake Road)	
		I-80 – Elko, Salt Lake City	
		US 93 (Great Basin Highway) – Jackpot, Twin Falls, Ely, Salt Lake	
1.000 mi = 1.609 km; 1.000 km = 0.621 mi
