= Tulasco, Nevada =

- Ghost town
- Location within Nevada Location within the United States
- Coordinates: 41°07′47″N 115°07′21″W
- Country: United States
- State: Nevada
- County: Elko
- Elevation: 5,489 ft (1,673 m)

Tulasco is an extinct town in Elko County, Nevada, United States.

Tulasco is a railroad name with an unknown origin.

== History ==
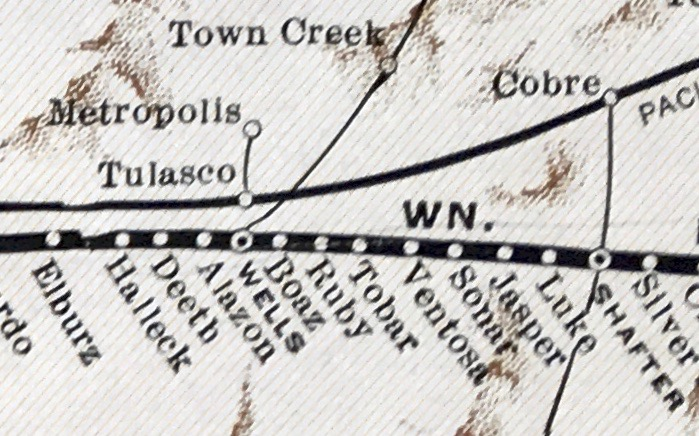
Route in 1931

Tulasco had its start in 1869 as a railroad depot on a side track of the Central Pacific railroad. Tulasco later became the terminus for traffic to Metropolis. Tulasco consisted of a small depot, a restaurant and a saloon. In 1941, Tulasco had 30 inhabitants.

Today, Tulasco is a railroad siding and only foundations remain.
