= Spring Creek High School =

Spring Creek High School may refer to:

- Spring Creek High School (Nevada)
- Spring Creek High School (North Carolina), Seven Springs, North Carolina
