= Nevada State Route 231 =

State highway in Nevada, United States

State Route 231
- Angel Lake Road

Route information
- Maintained by NDOT
- Length: 11.600 mi (18.668 km)
- Existed: 1976–present

Major junctions
- South end: Angel Lake
- North end: I-80 BL / SR 223 in Wells

Location
- Country: United States
- State: Nevada

Highway system
- Nevada State Highway System; Interstate; US; State; Pre‑1976; Scenic
← SR 230	→ SR 232

State Route 231 (SR 231) is an unsigned state highway in Elko County, Nevada, United States. Known as Angel Lake Road, the highway connects Angel Lake to the town of Wells. SR 231 is a Nevada Scenic Byway.

== Route description ==
SR 231 begins at the Angel Lake fee booth, providing access to the lake and nearby picnic and campground areas. From there, the highway heads in a general eastward direction, descending through switchbacks along the east side of the East Humboldt Range. Once traveling about 5.5 miles (8.9 km) to clear of the mountains, the road turns more sharply to the north. The final 1.5 miles (2.4 km) sees the route turn more directly eastward to enter the town of Wells. SR 231 comes to its northern terminus at the intersection of Angel Lake Road and Humboldt Avenue (SR 223) in Wells, just south of Interstate 80. Angel Lake Road may be closed to travel during winters.

== History ==
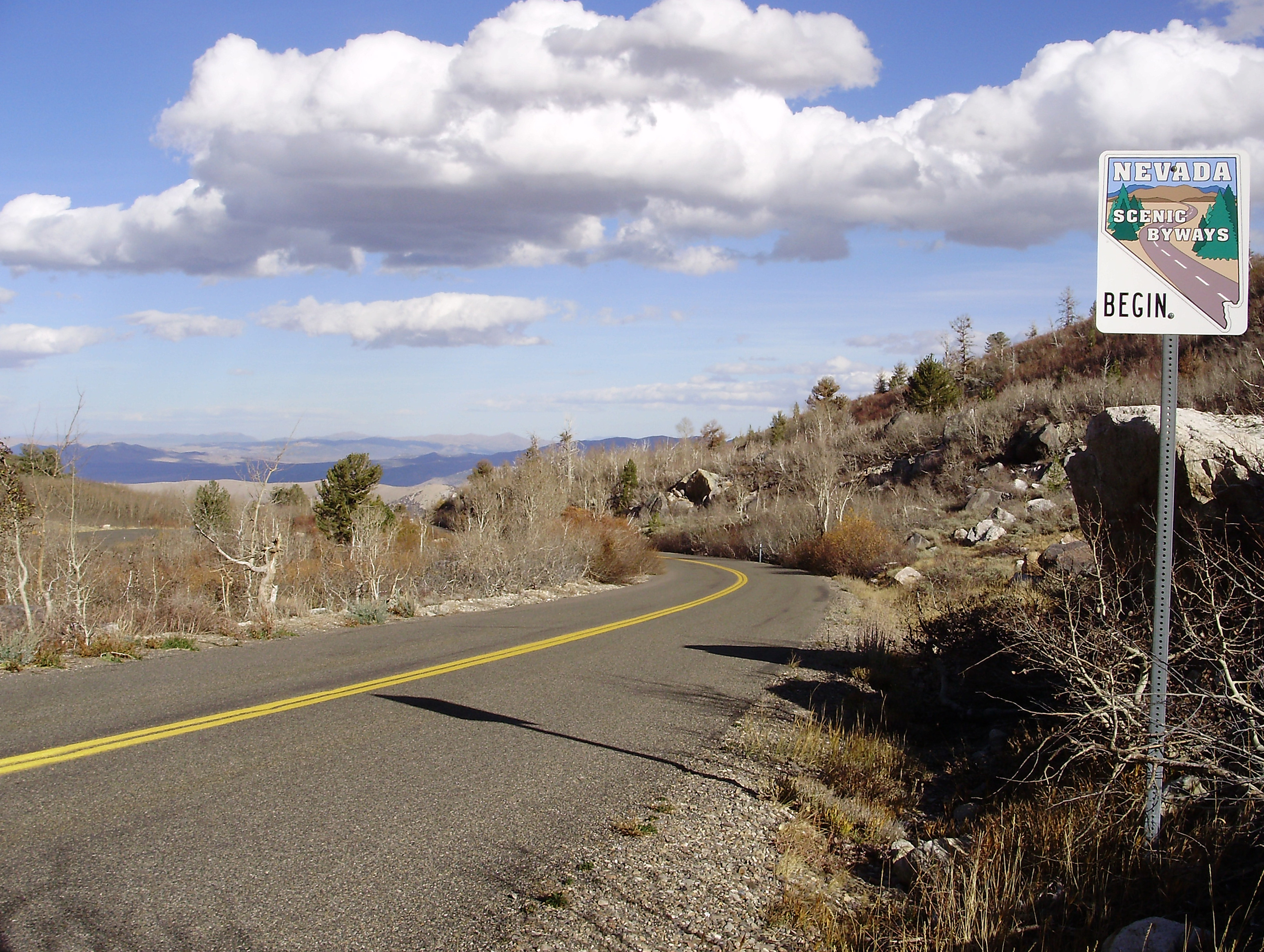
Looking toward Wells from Angel Lake, at the end of Angel Lake Road (SR 231)

Angel Lake Road became a state highway on July 1, 1976.

State Route 231 was designated a Nevada Scenic Byway on June 30, 1995.

== Major intersections ==
The entire route is in Elko County.

Location	mi	km	Destinations	Notes
Angel Lake	0.00	0.00	Angel Lake access	
Wells	11.60	18.67	I-80 BL / SR 223	TO I-80
1.000 mi = 1.609 km; 1.000 km = 0.621 mi
