= Northern Nevada 3A Region =

High school athletics subdivision in Nevada, USA

The Northern Nevada 3A Region is a part of the Nevada Interscholastic Activities Association, governing the northern half of Nevada for high school athletics. The Northern 3A league is the 2nd largest school level, which has schools with enrollments of 461 to 1200. As of the 2018–2019 school year, there are 10 member schools in the Northern 3A league. Elko High School, South Tahoe High School, and Churchill County High School moved down from the Northern 4A beginning the 2010–2011 school year and at the start of the 2018–2019 school year, North Valleys High School moved down from the Northern 4A to the Northern 3A.

== Current members ==
School	Mascot	Location
Dayton High	Dust Devils	Dayton, Nevada
Fernley High	Vaqueros	Fernley, Nevada
South Tahoe High	Vikings	South Lake Tahoe, California
Lowry High	Buckaroos	Winnemucca, Nevada
Sparks High	Railroaders	Sparks, Nevada
Elko High	Indians	Elko, Nevada
Spring Creek High	Spartans	Spring Creek, Nevada
Churchill County	Greenwave	Fallon, Nevada
Truckee High	Wolverines	Truckee, California
