= Nevada State Route 221 =

State highway in Nevada, United States

State Route 221
- Chestnut Street, Interstate 80 Business
- Nevada State Route 221, highlighted in red

Route information
- Maintained by NDOT
- Length: 2.977 mi (4.791 km)
- Existed: 1976–present

Major junctions
- West end: I-80 BL / SR 278 in Carlin
- East end: I-80 / I-80 BL in Carlin

Location
- Country: United States
- State: Nevada

Highway system
- Interstate Highway System; Main; Auxiliary; Suffixed; Business; Future; Nevada State Highway System; Interstate; US; State; Pre‑1976; Scenic
← I-215	→ SR 223

State Route 221 (SR 221) is a state highway in Elko County, Nevada. The route, concurrent with Interstate 80 Business (I-80 Bus.) follows Chestnut Street in the city of Carlin. The highway was once part of the former route of State Route 1 and former U.S. Route 40 (US 40).

== Route description ==
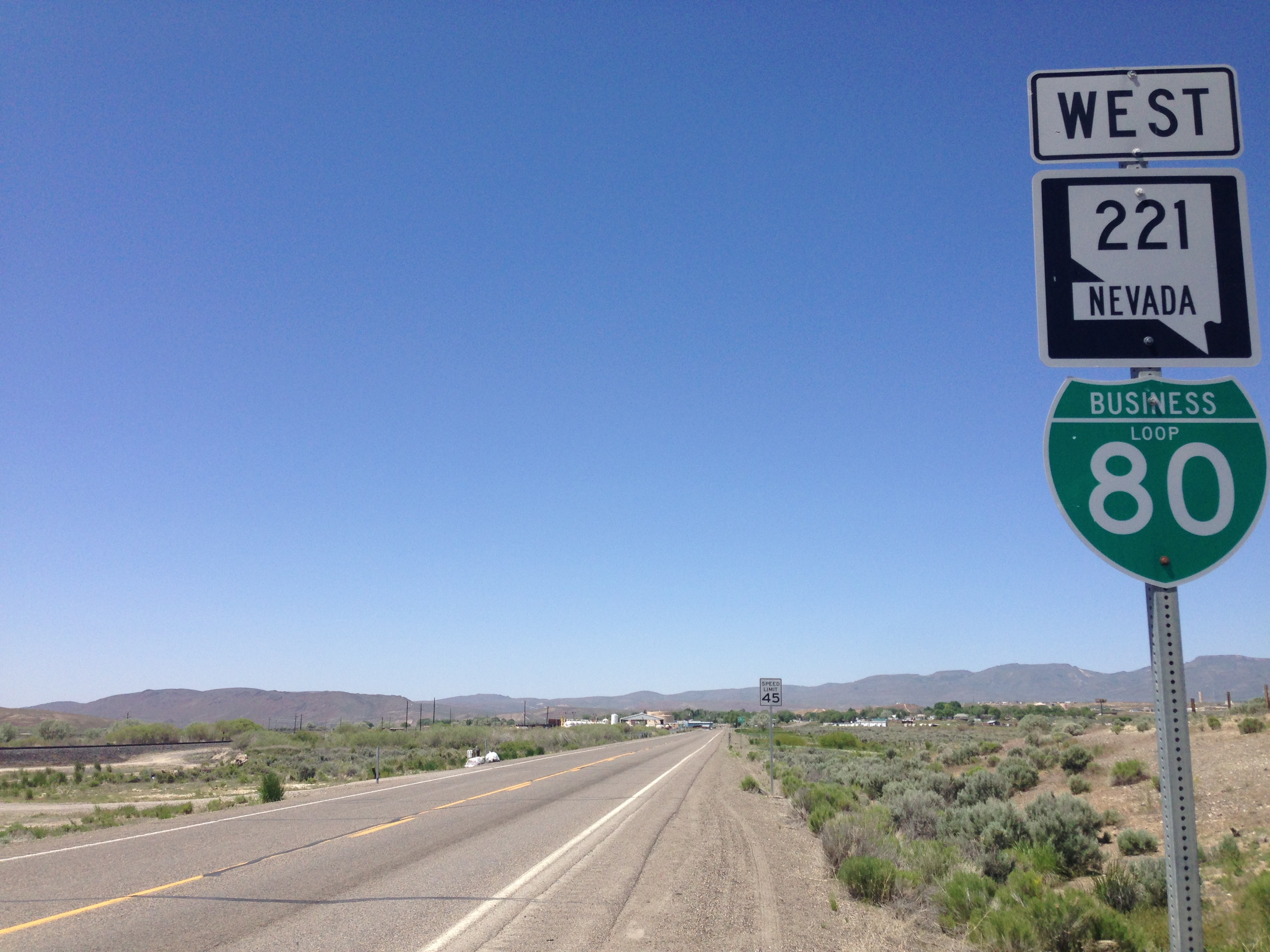
View from near the east end of SR 221 looking westbound

State Route 221 begins on SR 278 just south of Interstate 80 (I-80) west of downtown Carlin. From there, the route follows Chestnut Street east towards Carlin. After about 0.75 miles (1.21 km), the highway enters populated areas of Carlin, passing through residential areas and small businesses. The businesses and homes taper off after a little more than one mile (1.6 km). East of the central Carlin area, SR 221 turns north to return to I-80, where the route meets its end.

== History ==
Chestnut Street in Carlin was once designated as part State Route 1, one of the first four state highways in Nevada designated in 1917. The route was later designated part of US 40 in the original Bureau of Public Roads plan for the U.S. Highway system in 1926. Later, during the formation of the Interstate Highway System, I-80 would eventually replace SR 1/US 40 through Carlin. In 1974, officials in Utah initiated meetings with officials in Nevada and California to truncate the route of U.S. Route 91. Nevada officials agreed and further suggested that both US 91 and US 40 be truncated. Nevada officials recommended the changes occur in 1975, when the last Nevada piece of I-15 was expected to be complete. The 1976 edition of the Official Highway map for Nevada was the first not showing the US 40 designation.

In 1976, Nevada officials began renumbering its state highway system. On July 1, 1976, the SR 1 designation was eliminated and replaced with several other routes. The portion of former SR 1 and US 40 bypassed by I-80 through Carlin was redesignated as SR 221. The route has remained relatively unchanged since then.

== Major intersections ==
The entire route is in Carlin, Elko County.

mi	km	Destinations	Notes
0.00	0.00	SR 278 to I-80 – Eureka	Western terminus
		SR 766 to I-80 – Newmont Mine	
		Frontage Road	Old US 40
2.98	4.80	I-80 – Winnemucca, Elko	Eastern terminus
1.000 mi = 1.609 km; 1.000 km = 0.621 mi
