= Tim Gilligan =

American gridiron football player (born 1981)

No. 12, 87
- Position: Wide receiver

Personal information
- Born: February 17, 1981 (age 45); Elko, Nevada, U.S.
- Listed height: 5 ft 9 in (1.75 m)
- Listed weight: 180 lb (82 kg)

Career information
- High school: Elko
- College: Boise State
- NFL draft: 2004: undrafted

Career history
- 2004–2005: Montreal Alouettes
- Stats at CFL.ca

Timothy Ryan Gilligan (born February 17, 1981) is an American former professional football wide receiver who played two seasons with the Montreal Alouettes of the Canadian Football League (CFL). He played college football at Boise State University.

== Early life ==
Timothy Ryan Gilligan was born on February 17, 1981, in Elko, Nevada. He attended Elko High School in Elko.

== College career ==
Gilligan played for the Boise State Broncos from 2000 to 2003. He earned first All-WAC receiver and second team All-WAC punt-returner honors his senior season in 2003. He also set a school record for receiving yards in a season with 1,192 while also totalling a career-high 67 receptions and six touchdowns.

== Professional career ==
Gilligan signed with the CFL's Montreal Alouettes in June 2004. He played for the Alouettes during the 2004 and 2005 seasons.

== Personal life ==
In 2007, Gilligan took a job as a prison guard with the Idaho Maximum Security Institution. In September 2009, he was arraigned on a charge of felonious sexual misconduct. Gilligan admitted to having sexual relations with a female inmate. He was sentenced to three years in prison.

Gilligan was diagnosed with Parkinson's disease in 2024 and started the No Fair Catch Scholarship Fund to benefit walk-ons at Boise State and young onset Parkinson's disease.
