= Nevada State Route 766 =

State highway in Nevada, United States

State Route 766
- Newmont Mine Road
- SR 766 highlighted in red

Route information
- Maintained by NDOT
- Length: 11.507 mi (18.519 km)
- Existed: 1976–present

Major junctions
- South end: I-80 BL / SR 221 in Carlin
- I-80 in Carlin
- North end: Newmont Mine

Location
- Country: United States
- State: Nevada
- Counties: Elko, Eureka

Highway system
- Nevada State Highway System; Interstate; US; State; Pre‑1976; Scenic
← SR 759	→ SR 767

State Route 766 (SR 766) is a state highway in north central Nevada. It runs from the town of Carlin north to serve Newmont Mine.

== Route description ==
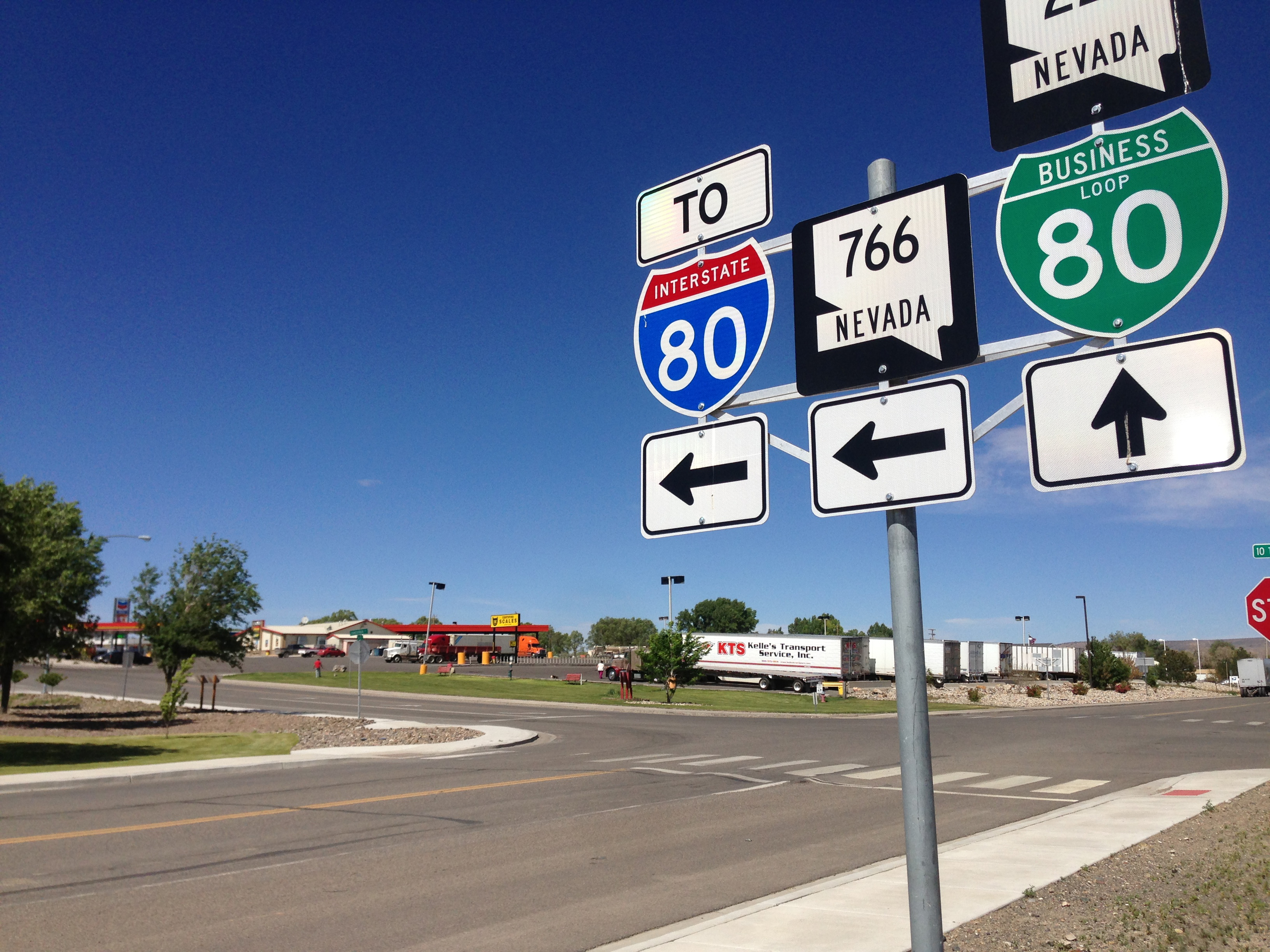
Sign for SR 766 on SR 221. No signage for SR 766 exists along the route itself.

State Route 766 begins in the center of Carlin in Elko County, at an intersection with 10th Street and Chestnut Street (Interstate 80 Business/SR 221). From there, the route heads northward along 10th Street, which becomes Newmont Mine Road. SR passes over Interstate 80 and then heads out of Carlin. The route passes by some light industrial and agricultural areas as it heads north-northwest. SR 766 begins to parallel Maggie Creek on its journey northward. After about 5 miles (8.0 km), the route crosses into Eureka County. The route travels another approximately 6 miles (9.7 km) before coming to its terminus just north of the turnoff to Newmont Mine.

== History ==
SR 766 was designated on July 1, 1976.

== Major intersections ==
County	Location	mi	km	Destinations	Notes
Elko	Carlin			I-80 BL / SR 221	Southern terminus
Elko	Carlin			I-80 – Reno, Elko	
Eureka				Newmont Mine access	Northern terminus
1.000 mi = 1.609 km; 1.000 km = 0.621 mi
