= Metropolis, Nevada =

- Ghost town
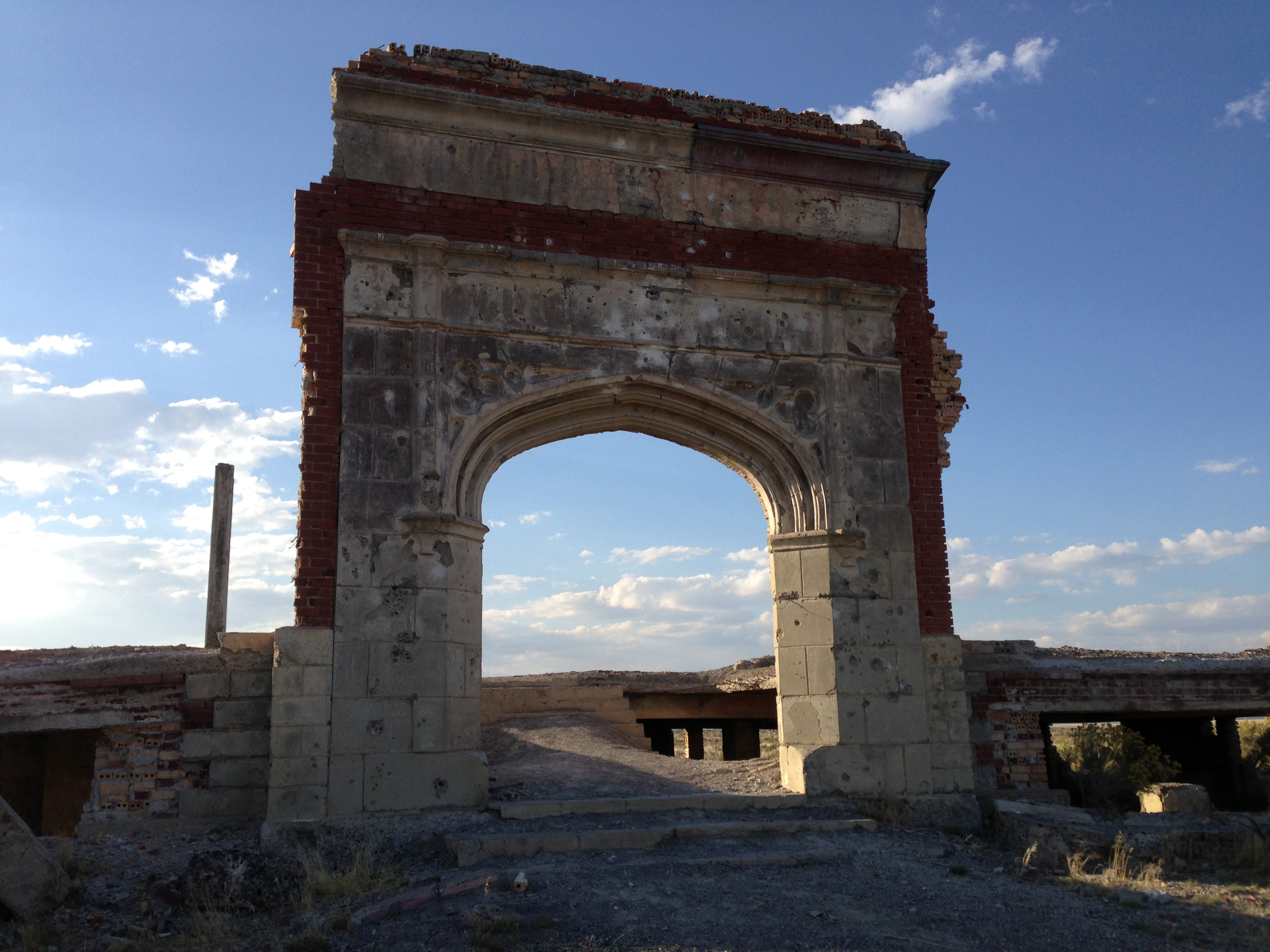
- Ruins of Lincoln School, Metropolis, Nevada (2014)

- Location within the state of Nevada Metropolis (the United States)
- Coordinates: 41°13′41″N 115°3′22″W
- Country: United States
- State: Nevada
- County: Elko
- Time zone: UTC-8 (Pacific (PST))
  - Summer (DST): UTC-7 (PDT)

Metropolis is a ghost town in Elko County, Nevada, 12 mi (19 km) northwest of Wells.

During the early twentieth century, many homesteaders attempted to farm in the Great Basin, especially in western Utah but also in northeastern Nevada. Creating the town of Metropolis was the project of an eastern businessman, Harry L. Pierce of Leominster, Massachusetts, and of investors from both Massachusetts and Salt Lake City. During the second decade of the twentieth century, Pierce's Pacific Reclamation Company attempted to make the optimistically named Metropolis the center of a huge farming district.

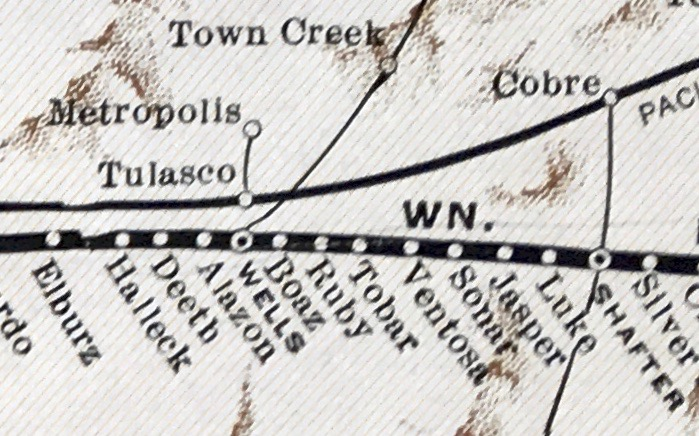
Railroad route in 1931

The Company purchased 40,000 acres (16,000 ha) of desert land in 1910 and hired a respected Salt Lake City contractor, P. J. “Pat” Moran, to build a dam on Bishop Creek, 15 mi (24 km) east of the planned city, hoping to use the reservoir for irrigation. Once the dam was complete, the Company stepped up its promotional campaign, and the LDS Church encouraged members to move there. The town became predominantly Mormon, and no church was ever built in Metropolis because the Mormons used the town amusement hall as a meetinghouse.

In an attempt to demonstrate permanence, the Company built the amusement hall, a post office, a school, a train depot, and a modern hotel, complete with an electric generator, central heating, and hot and cold running water in every room. A railroad spur was extended to the town site, and regular passenger service began in 1912. The population grew to nearly 700.

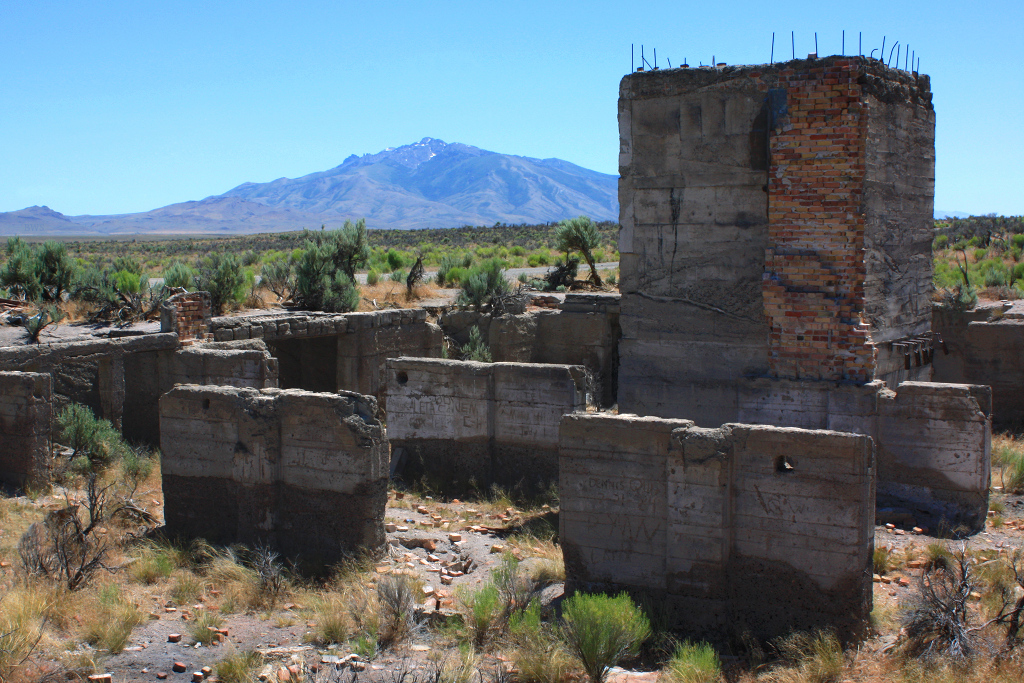
Hotel ruins and Greys Peak

Superficially the town seemed a success, but it encountered serious problems. Pierce had failed to obtain water rights to Bishop Creek, and the downstream town of Lovelock sued to prevent the impoundment of water behind Bishop Creek Dam. Because residents could not irrigate, many tried dry-farming wheat, successfully at first.

After settlers killed marauding coyotes, the jackrabbit population rose dramatically. Rabbits systematically ate the wheat, and farmers retaliated with guns, poison, and organized drives. They killed thousands of jackrabbits and sold them in San Francisco.

Dry-farming was possible only for a few years because of unusually high precipitation. Lower rainfall and Mormon crickets ended the experiment. Pacific Reclamation declared bankruptcy in 1920. In 1922 the railroad discontinued service. By 1924, only 200 people remained. The amusement hall and hotel burned, and the last store closed in 1925, the post office in 1942. The population was 127 in 1940.

The few remaining residents turned to ranching. By 1950 Metropolis was a ghost town. Today ranches surround the town site. The ruins of the hotel and school and a cemetery are all that remain.
