= Sparks High School =

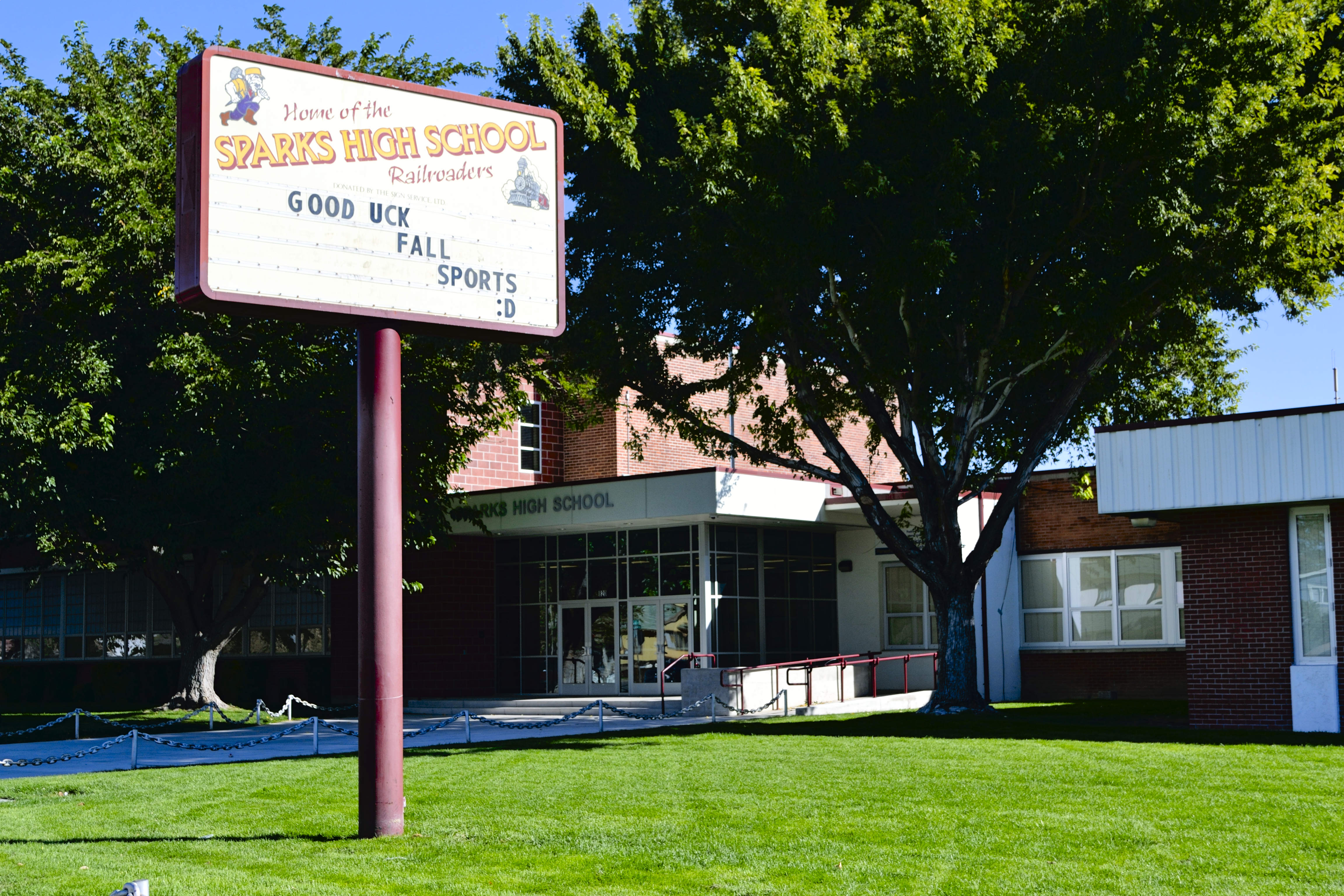
- Image of the school

Location
- 820 15th Street; Sparks, Nevada

Information
- Type: Public
- School district: Washoe County School District
- Principal: CJ Waddell
- Teaching staff: 59.50 (FTE)
- Grades: 912
- Enrollment: 1,211 (2024–2025)
- Student to teacher ratio: 20.35
- Colors: Maroon and gold
- Mascot: Railroaders
- Yearbook: Streamline

Sparks High School is a public high school located at 820 15th Street, Sparks, Nevada, United States. It serves about 1150 students as a member of the Washoe County School District. It is ranked in the top-1000 schools based on the number of AP exams. Its mascot is the "Railroaders" and has a distinct train whistle when a game is taking place.

== Athletics ==
Sparks High School's sports clubs are known as the "Railroaders," a reference to the city of Sparks' beginnings as a small railroad town affiliate to Reno in the late 19th century - early 20th century. The Railroaders have competed in the NIAA 3A North League since 2005 and have shown good athletic performances in different sports. They have won numerous league, regional, and state titles throughout the school's history.

=== Football ===
The Railroaders football team earned great success and respect throughout northern Nevada and surrounding areas by winning many championships, and undefeated seasons, through the 1920s, 1930s, and 1940s. Coach Edwin "Tip" Whitehead has been credited for building a football dynasty in the 1940s, which had numerous undefeated seasons and won State championships. The athletic complex at Sparks High is named after the iconic coach. The Railroaders have won the Nevada State Championship 7 times.

=== Soccer ===
Over the past years, Sparks has been renowned for their boys' soccer team, winning a State title in November 2011, defeating the Wolverines of Truckee High School of Truckee, CA by a scored of 1–0 on a lone goal for the 3A State title. Success in soccer has not only happened against the 3A, but also against the 4A, where the soccer Railroaders have proved themselves as one of the best teams in Nevada, and the West Coast. The team has been renowned enough as a soccer power to receive a sponsorship from Nike. In November 2016, Sparks had won a State title defeating the Warriors of Western High School of Las Vegas, NV by a score of 2–0 for the 3A State title. Sparks also won the State title 2016.

=== Basketball ===
Boys' Basketball has also been dominated by the Railroaders . After having fallen short in years before, the Railroader won the Nevada 3A State title in February 2010, knocking off the Buckaroos of Lowry High School of Winnemucca, NV in the championship match-up, at Lawlor Events Center on the campus of the University of Nevada in Reno.

== Notable alumni ==
- Alexis Hansen, politician.
- Randy Messenger, former MLB player (Florida Marlins, San Francisco Giants, Seattle Mariners)
- Brian Retterer, swimmer Stanford
- Harvey Whittemore, lawyer and businessman.
