= Elko High School =

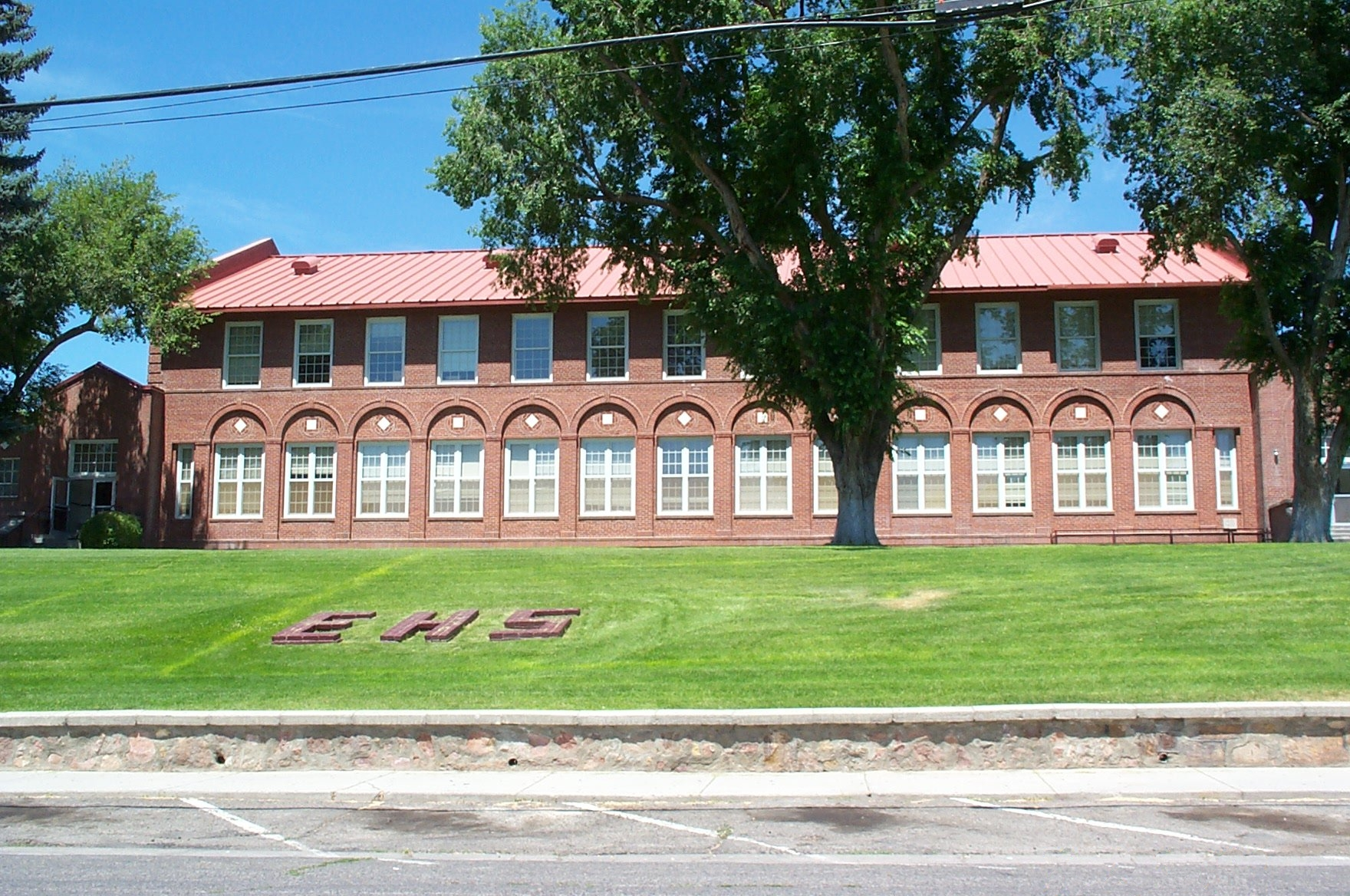
- Old Main Building

Location
- 987 College Avenue; Elko, Nevada 89801; United States; 40.839°N 115.760°W

Information
- School type: Public, secondary
- Established: 1895
- School district: Elko County School District
- School number: (775) 738-7281
- Principal: Johnathon Foss
- Teaching staff: 62.00 (FTE)
- Grades: 9-12
- Enrollment: 1,433 (2023-2024)
- Student to teacher ratio: 23.11
- Colours: Maroon and white
- Fight song: "On Ye Indians" (to the tune of "On, Wisconsin!")
- Athletics conference: Division 3A
- Mascot: Indian
- Team name: Indians
- Newspaper: Pow-Wow
- Yearbook: Pohob
- Website: elkohigh.ecsdnv.net

Elko High School (EHS) is a public secondary school in Elko, Nevada, in the United States. It is part of the Elko County School District.

The school's mascot is the Indian and its colors are maroon and white. Its marching band, the Elko High School Marching Band, is known as the "Pride of Nevada."

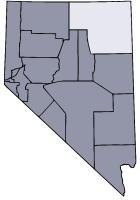
Elko County, Nevada highlighted

== History ==
Elko High School was established in 1895 as the first county public school in Nevada.

Elko High School's old gymnasium stands on the site of the first University of Nevada. The University of Nevada in Elko was open from October 12, 1874, to July 10, 1885. Other than a few memories, all that remains of the first University of Nevada is a street called College Avenue. It runs in front of Elko High School - put in and named after the school left town.

== Extracurricular activities ==
=== Athletics ===
The Indians now compete in the Northern Division 3A. They had a long run competing in 4A athletics.

- The varsity football team has won five state title since the school started playing football in 1948; 1953 (28-21), 1954 (T 14-14), 1962 (37-6), 1980 (33-0), and 1985 (16-7). The Indians play their home games at Warrior Field, located on campus. Their home side bleachers were the former endzone bleachers at Mackay Stadium at the University of Nevada, Reno).
- The girls' and boys' basketball program has won some state titles. The girls won the large school state title last in 1995. The girls have won two in state.
- The school has a regulation-size stadium and track and one of the biggest basketball gyms in Northern Nevada.

==== Nevada Interscholastic Activities Association ====
- Baseball - 1980, 1981, 1983, 1988, 1989; consecutive 2A state champs 1982-83-84, 57 consecutive wins; 1986; 1989; 3A-1994-1995; Coach Lynette Davis - NIAA all-time leader most wins- 563; 3rd all time state titles - 7

=== Performing arts ===
- As of 2007–2008, Elko High Band has finished 1st or 2nd place in the state marching band competition 21 out of 25 times. They are a 10-time state marching band champion (Last in 2001) with 12 second-place finishes.
- The band marched in the Inaugural Parade for U.S. President Richard Nixon's second term in 1973 and Ronald Reagan's first term, in 1981.
- They have performed in the Tournament of Roses Parade in Pasadena, California three times, in 1983, 1995, and 1999.
- The band played twice in the Macy's Thanksgiving Day Parade in New York City in 1979 and 2000.
- The marching band has performed twice in the Hollywood Christmas Parade in the Hollywood community in Los Angeles, California.
- The band marched in the Orange Bowl Parade in 1997.
- They have played in various other parades around the state of Nevada as well as across the United States, numerous college football pre-game and halftime shows including a Freedom Bowl, Fiesta Bowl, and multiple Holiday Bowl's, and a pregame show at a San Francisco 49ers game.
- The band hosts an annual Jazz Festival that has featured guests such as Eric Marienthal, Wayne Bergeron, Allen Vizzutti, Mike Vax, Ed Shaughnessy of The Tonight Show fame, and many others.
- The band has been named "The Pride of Nevada" by five different Nevada governors.
- The Elko High School Wind Ensemble, Concert Band, and Jazz Ensemble have received superior ratings every year from 1978 to the present (as of August 2011).

The Choral music department is represented by the award-winning Choraliers. They have received top ratings in national choral festivals for the past 20 years. In 2006, they received an invitation to the National Invitation of Gold Choral Festival in New York City.

They have traveled to Anaheim, Hollywood, Las Vegas, Orlando, Seattle, San Francisco and Hawaii (2008, 2012, 2016 & 2020) and were invited to and participated in the National Invitational Festival of Gold in San Francisco in 2009 and 2013. In 2013, they were selected as the top large ensemble and men's ensemble at the San Francisco Festival of Gold.

The Choraliers Sang in Carnegie Hall in April 2018. They accepted an invitation to sing in 2018, having been invited four times before.

=== Publications ===
- The Pow Wow — monthly school newspaper, is the oldest in the state.
- The yearbook is titled Pohob, which means "sagebrush".
- War Whoops! is the longest running radio show in the state of Nevada, broadcast on Wednesdays at 7:05 on AM 1240 KELK.

=== Rivalries ===
Football rivalries are Spring Creek High-Elko (Battle of the Summit). The series is led by Elko and McQueen-Elko (High Desert League).

Basketball rivalries are Churchill County High School-Elko.

The school's hometown rival is Spring Creek. Other Nevada rivals are Churchill County Lowry and Winnemucca.

== Notable alumni ==
- John Ellison, member, Nevada State Legislature
- Tim Gilligan, former Boise State wide receiver
