= East Humboldt Range =

Mountain range in Nevada, United States

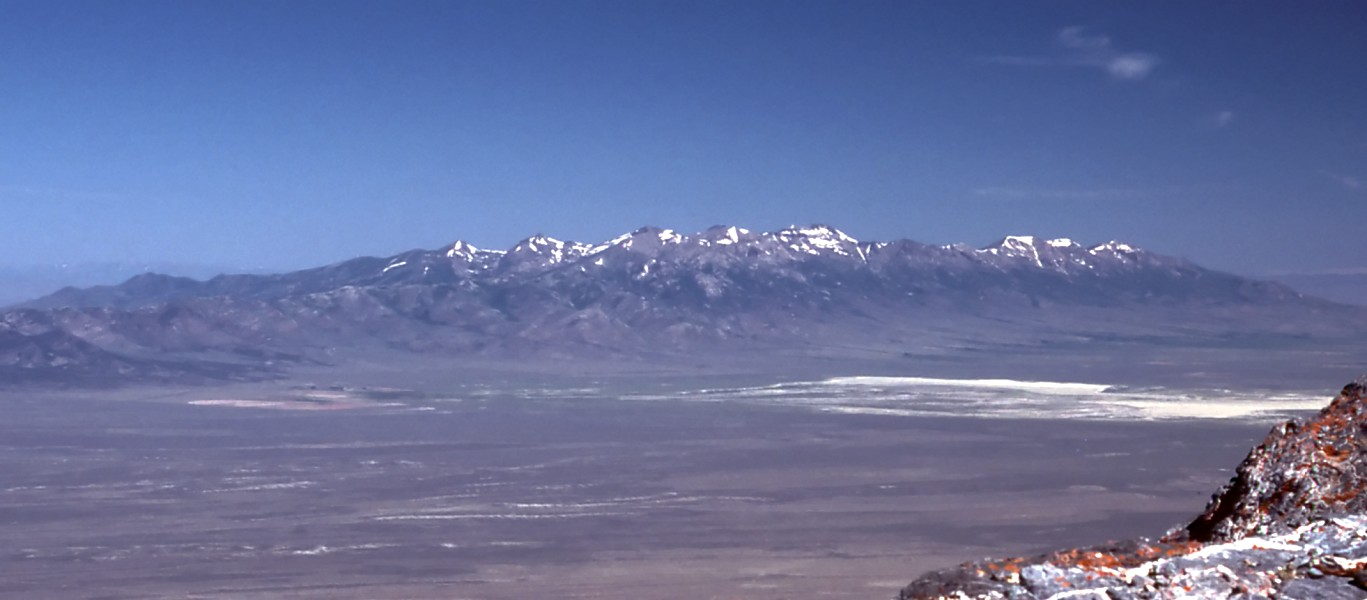
- The East Humboldt Range, looking northwest from Spruce Mountain

Highest point
- Peak: Hole in the Mountain Peak
- Elevation: 3,446 m (11,306 ft)

Geography
- Location within Nevada
- Country: United States
- State: Nevada
- County: Elko County
- Range coordinates: 40°55′16.724″N 115°7′7.177″W
- Topo map: USGS Humboldt Peak

The East Humboldt Range is a mountain range in Elko County, Nevada, United States. It is located along the eastern edge of the upper watershed of the Humboldt River, which flows southwest from its source just north of the range. The range reaches a maximum elevation of 11,306 feet (3,446 m) atop Hole in the Mountain Peak. Most of the range is included within the Ruby Mountains Ranger District of the Humboldt-Toiyabe National Forest. In 1989, the United States Congress passed the Nevada Wilderness Protection Act, establishing over 36,000 acres (150 km^{2}) of the range as the East Humboldt Wilderness. The range takes its name from the Humboldt River. The name ultimately is derived from the German naturalist Alexander von Humboldt.

The East Humboldts run north-to-south for approximately 30 miles (48 km). To the north are Interstate 80 and the community of Wells, while to the south are Secret Pass, the larger Ruby Range, and Ruby Valley. To the east are Clover Valley and U.S. Route 93, and to the west are Starr Valley and Dennis Flats.

These mountains were formed by a tilted fault-block process, with gradual slopes and valleys to the west and a steep escarpment to the east. Both sides of the range show extensive evidence of glaciation during recent ice ages, including U-shaped canyons, moraines, and steeply carved granite mountains, cliffs, and cirques. All of these features can be seen from the 12-mile (19 km) paved road from Wells to scenic Angel Lake.

The range begins with a dramatic rise from a point near the source of the Humboldt River and the community of Wells, at an elevation of 5,650 feet (1,720 m), to the summit of Greys Peak at 10,674 feet (3,253 m). From there, the range continues south for nearly 10 miles (16 km) as a high crest, staying mostly above 10,000 feet (3,000 m). The center section of this crest includes the range high point, Hole in the Mountain Peak. The southernmost high summit of the range is Humboldt Peak (11,020 ft (3,360 m)), after which the main crest begins a gradual descent, forming the northeastern slopes of Secret Pass and the eastern side of North Ruby Valley.

The range includes many glacial tarns, including Angel Lake, Smith Lake, Greys Lake, and Winchell Lake to the north, and Lizzie's Basin, Boulder Lakes, and Steele Lake in the central section.

Hiking trails run from Secret Pass up the western side of the range all the way around to Angel Lake, from Angel Lake to nearby Smith Lake, and from a trailhead near Angel Lake down the east side of the range to Winchell Lake and Lizzie's Basin. Public access is principally found at Angel Lake, a trailhead at the west end of Secret Pass, and via a primitive road at Weeks Canyon/Lizzie's Basin.

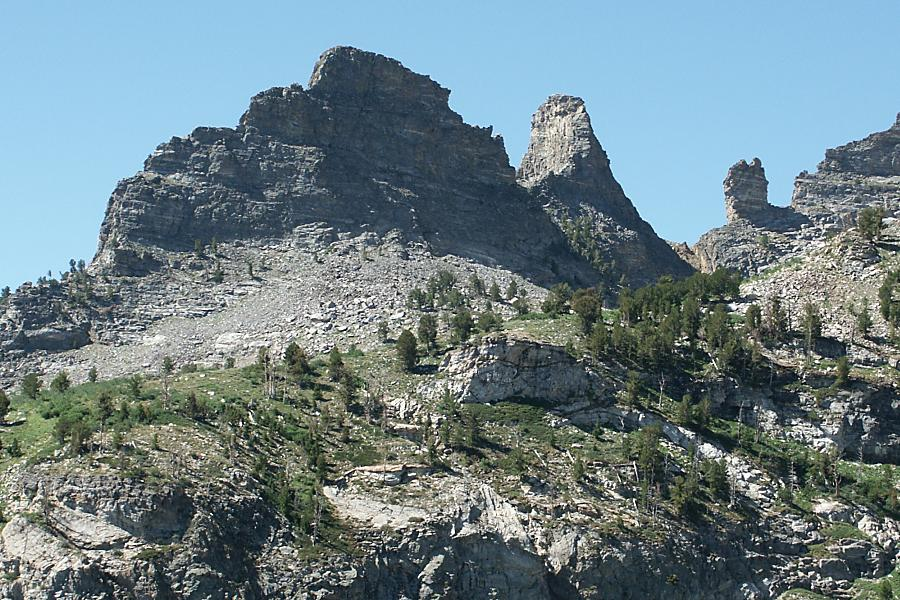
Chimney Rock, above Angel Lake

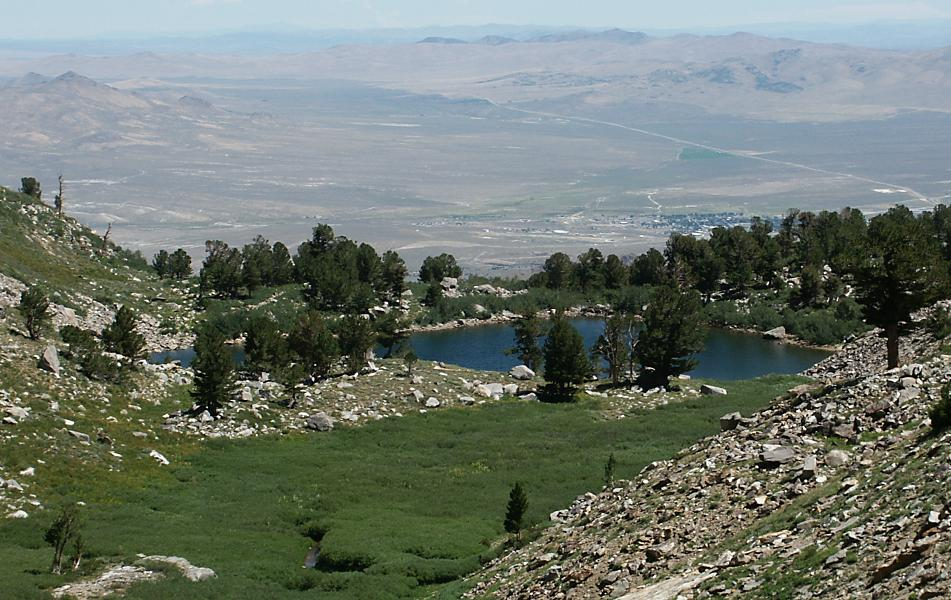
Smith Lake (with Wells in the distance)

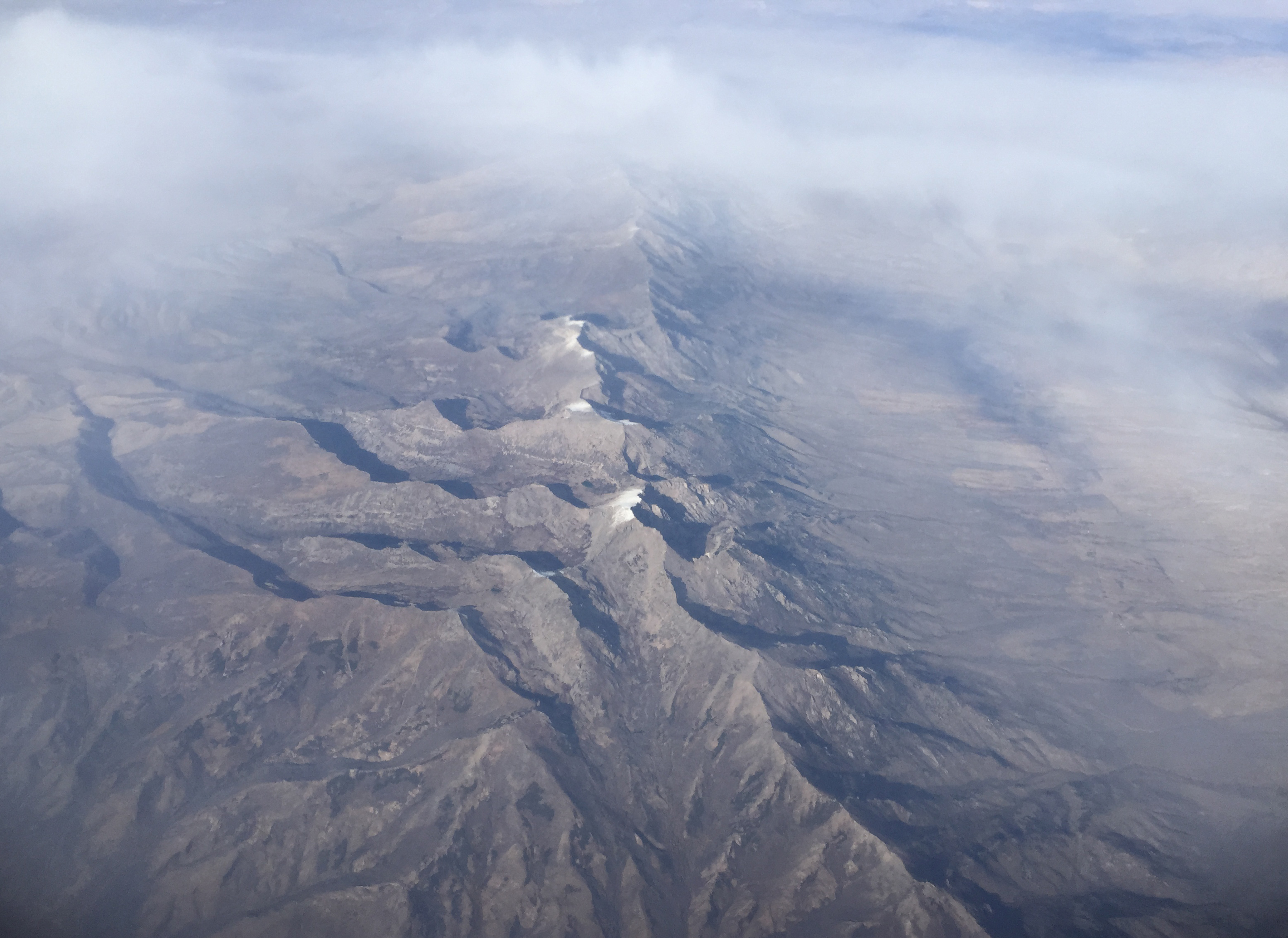
View of the range from an airplane

== See also ==
- West Humboldt Range
