= East Humboldt Wilderness =

Wilderness area in Nevada, United States

- East Humboldts Wilderness
- IUCN category Ib (wilderness area)
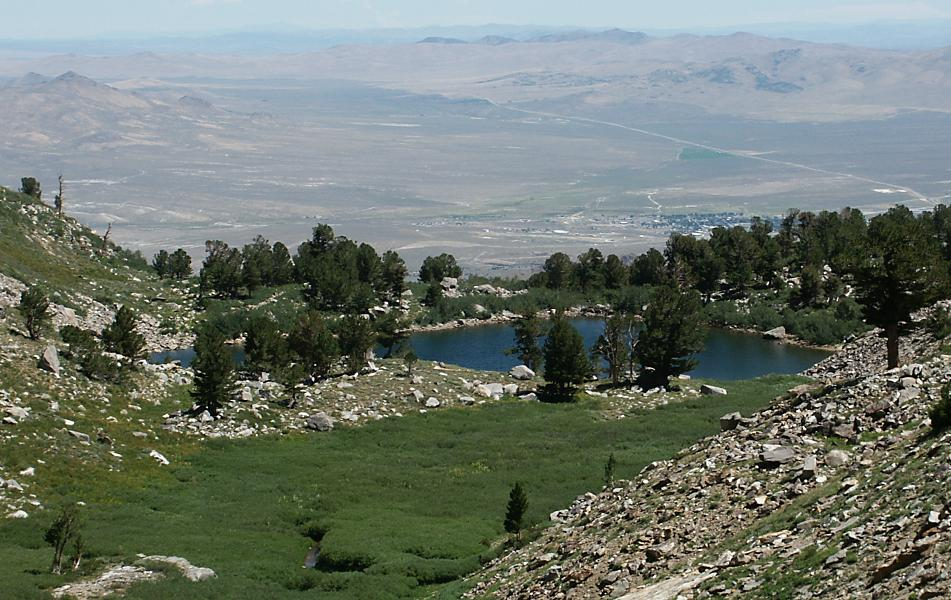
- Smith Lake in the East Humboldt Wilderness Area

- Location within Nevada Location within the United States
- Location: Elko County, Nevada USA
- Nearest city: Wells, NV
- Coordinates: 40°57′00″N 115°07′00″W
- Governing body: U.S. Forest Service

The East Humboldt Wilderness is a protected wilderness area in the East Humboldt Range of Elko County, in the northeast section of the state of Nevada in the western United States.

The East Humboldt Wilderness covers an area of approximately 36,900 acres (14,900 ha), and is administered by the Humboldt-Toiyabe National Forest.

== See also ==
- Nevada Wilderness Areas
- List of wilderness areas in Nevada
- List of U.S. Wilderness Areas
- Wilderness Act
