= Tobar, Nevada =

Ghost town

Coordinates: 40°53′47″N 114°53′25″W

Tobar is an extinct town in Elko County, in the U.S. state of Nevada.

Established in 1908, Tobar was at first a Western Pacific Railroad construction camp. Following the normal progression of settlement in those days, the first structure was erected - a bar. The owner put a sign up proclaiming his business was the Rag Saloon. Then, to make sure he got business, he trudged up to the railroad proper where he drove a stake in the ground and nailed up a board sign that said "To Bar." Railroad officials, always looking for town names, promptly gave the place its name, Tobar. (Howard Hickson's Histories)

One source states that the community was named after one Captain Tobar, a local prospector. Another source states that railroad officials saw a directional sign reading "To Bar". A post office was in operation at Tobar between 1911 and 1921. A variant name was "Clover City". In 1941, the population was 22.

In 1969, a train containing military bombs caught fire and exploded at the site of Tobar.
