= Spring Creek High School (Nevada) =

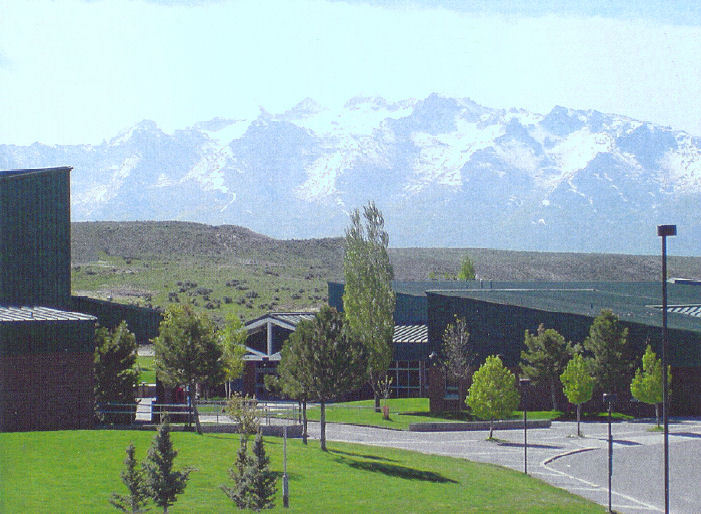
- Spring Creek High School

Location
- 14550 Lamoille Highway; Spring Creek, Nevada; United States; 40.77482°N 115.64247°W

Information
- Type: Public secondary
- Established: 1993
- School district: Elko County School District
- Principal: Wade Pearson
- Teaching staff: 40.00 (FTE)
- Grades: 9-12
- Enrollment: 880 (2024–2025)
- Student to teacher ratio: 22.00
- Campus: Rural
- Colours: Purple, Silver, and Black
- Athletics conference: Northern 3A
- Mascot: Spartan
- Rival: Elko
- Website: https://schs.ecsdnv.net

Spring Creek High School (SCHS) is a public secondary school in Spring Creek, Nevada, in the United States. Part of the Elko County School District, its mascot is the Spartan and the school's colors are purple, silver, and black.It is also located next to the middle school

== History ==
In 1993, Spring Creek High School was built to help with the population boom in Elko County. SCHS sits in the middle of Spring Creek, Nevada, a small bedroom community just south of Elko. Spring Creek has a population just over 10,000. It has a total area of 58.7 square miles (152 km^{2}). The first graduating class at Spring Creek High was the Class of 1996

== Extracurricular activities ==
The activities at SCHS include many sports and several clubs.

=== Athletics ===
The Spring Creek Spartans compete in the Northern 3A, which belongs to the NIAA.

- Girls Track won the 3A State Title from 2000–2006
- Wrestling 4 time 3A State Champions

==== NIAA state championships ====
- Football - 1997
- Basketball (Girls) - 2006, 2007, 2009
- Cross Country (Girls) - 1994-1997
- Softball - 1996, 2000
- Track and Field (Girls) - 2000, 2001, 2002, 2003, 2004, 2005, 2006
- Wrestling -1996, 2004, 2005, 2006, 2007, 2008
- Golf - 1997

=== Music ===
The Marching Spartans have four state titles in the small band division (1996, 1998, 2015, 2016), marched in the Hollywood Christmas Parade in 1998, and toured the Basque country in Northern Spain and Southern France in 1999.
