= Elko County School District =

School district headquartered in Elko, Nevada, US

Elko County School District (ECSD) is a school district headquartered in Elko, Nevada. It includes all of Elko County.

== History ==
The board of trustees, by 2022, was considering holding classes for only four days per week instead of five in the schools of Elko and Spring Creek. In 2022 a survey stated that the percentages of the combined sum of employees, parents, and students who supported this change ranged from 66% to 75%.

In 2022 the board of trustees voted to appoint Clayton Anderson as the district superintendent.

== Schools ==
K-12 schools (known as "combined schools")

- Carlin Combined School
- Jackpot Combined School
- Owyhee Combined School
- Wells Combined School - Has two separate campuses for elementary and secondary levels.

High schools

- Elko High School
- Spring Creek High School
- West Wendover High School

Middle schools (all have grades 7 and 8)

- Adobe Middle School
- Spring Creek Middle School (also has the 6th grade)
- West Wendover Middle School

Elementary schools

- Grade 6:
  - Flag View Intermediate School
- Kindergarten - Grade 5:
  - Liberty Peak Elementary School
  - Sage Elementary School
  - Spring Creek Elementary School
- PK- Grade 5th Grammar #2:
  - Grammar #2 Elementary School
  - Southside Elementary School
- K-4:
  - Mountain View Elementary School
  - Northside Elementary School
- Other:
  - West Wendover Elementary School

Rural schools

- Independence Valley Rural School
- Montello Rural School
- Mound Valley Rural School
- Ruby Valley Rural School
