= Wood Hills =

Mountain range in Elko County, Nevada, US

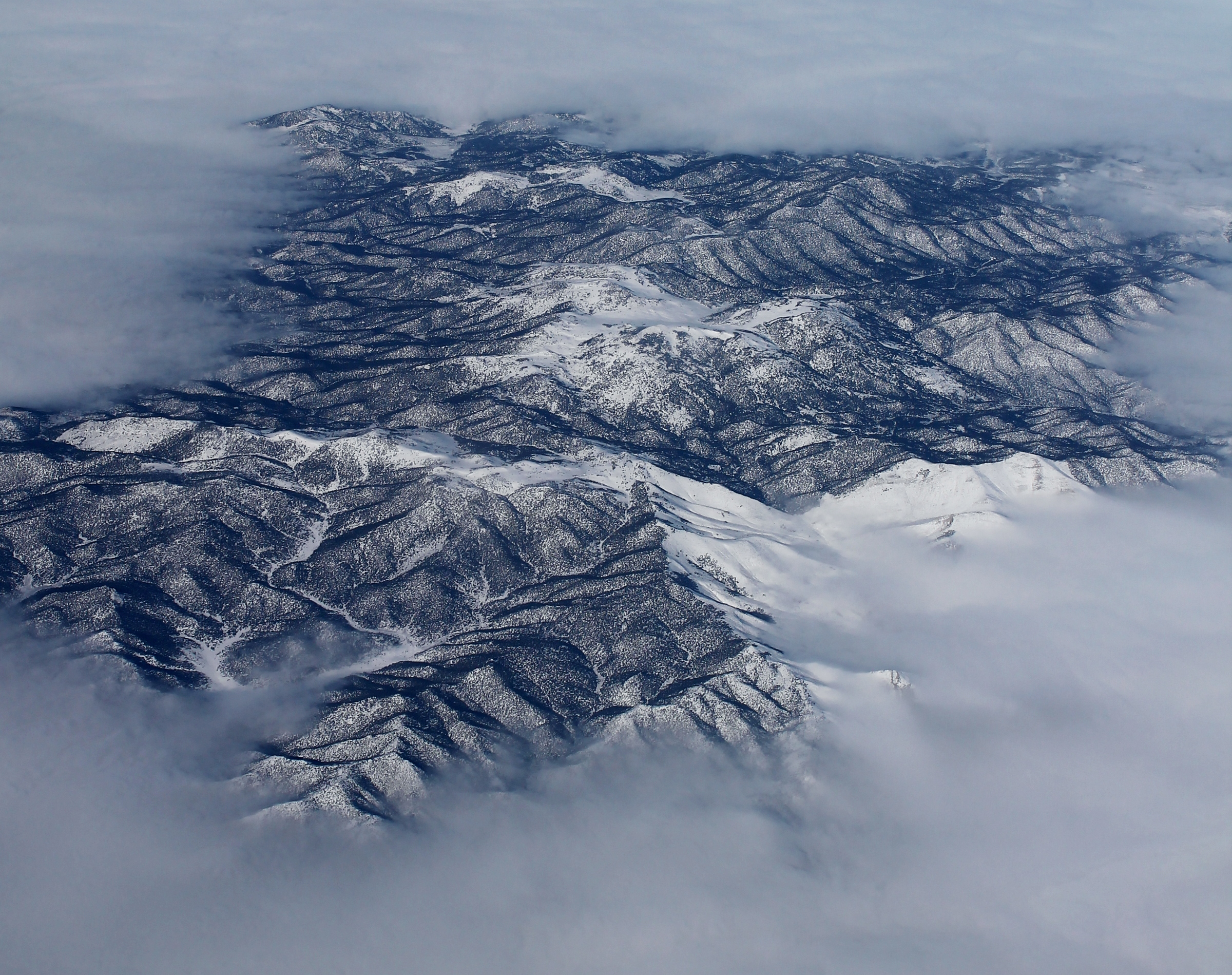
- Aerial view of Little Cedar Mountain in the Wood Hills

Highest point
- Elevation: 2,499 m (8,199 ft)

Geography
- Location within Nevada
- Country: United States
- State: Nevada
- District: Elko County
- Range coordinates: 41°2′20.725″N 114°50′56.147″W
- Topo map: USGS Moor Summit

The Wood Hills are a mountain range in Elko County, Nevada.
