= Clover Valley (Nevada) =

Valley in Elko County, Nevada, US

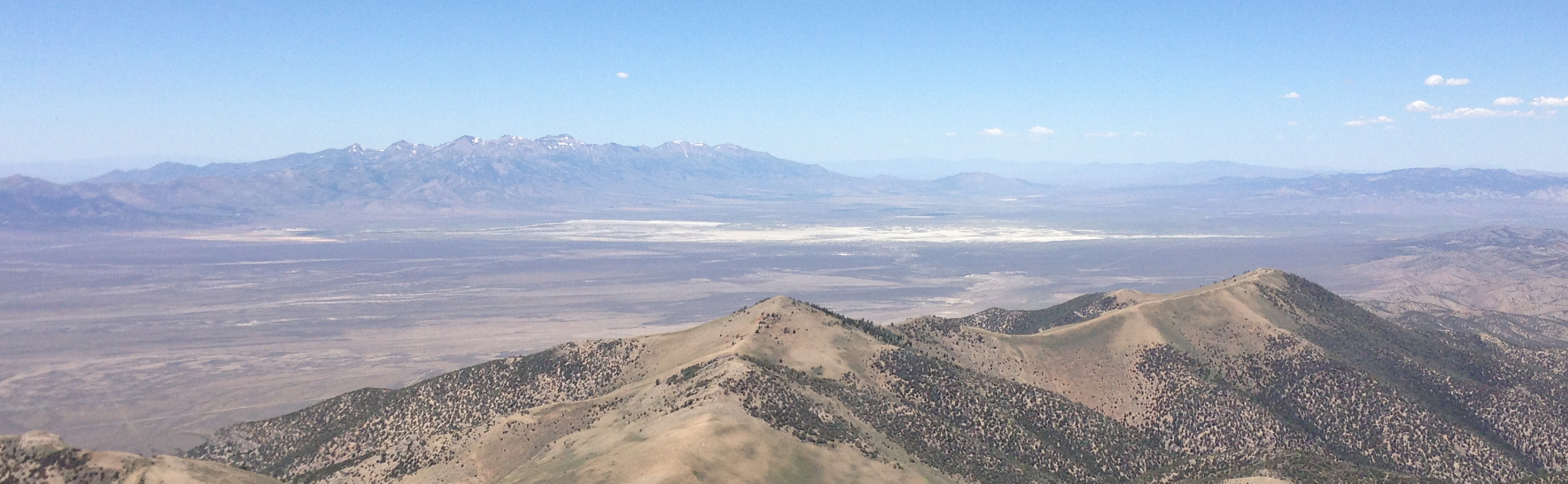
- View of Clover Valley, Nevada from Spruce Mountain

- Location within Nevada
- Length: 37 mi (60 km) N-S
- Width: 20 mi (32 km)

Geography
- Country: United States
- State: Nevada
- Region: Great Basin
- County: Elko
- Population center: Wells
- Borders on: List: East Humboldt Range; Wells, NV; Snake Mountains; Wood Hills; Independence Valley; Spruce Mountain (Nevada); U.S. 93
- Coordinates: 40°53′47″N 114°53′25″W
- Lake: Snow Water Lake
- Interactive map of Clover Valley (Nevada)

The Clover Valley of Nevada, is a 37-mile (60 km) long valley located in central-southeast Elko County. Wells, Nevada, lies at its north end, on I-80.

Clover Valley lies at the east flank of the mostly north-trending East Humboldt Range, which supplies numerous creeks to the north valley; the mountain forests supplying the water are a section of the Humboldt-Toiyabe National Forest. A slough exists in the north which drains south to intermittent Snow Water Lake.

== Description ==
Clover Valley trends north-south. The Wood Hills lie along the northeast and eastern edge, to the southeast of Wells; Spruce Mountain is south-southeast.

Dissected lowlands or flatlands surround Snow Water Lake, which lies near the valley's center, except on its west at the East Humboldt Range foothills bordering the lake.

== History ==
The first permanent settlement at Clover Valley was made in 1864. A station on the Western Pacific Railroad between Ventosa and Wells was named for a directional sign posted on the building pointing the way to the local bar. Being crudely written, it was read and assumed to be the location of TOBAR.

A post office was established at the site as Clover City and changed to Tobar on December 20, 1911 and was renamed Clover City again on December 11, 1918. Tobar became active from January 18, 1921 until it was decommissioned on September 17, 1942.

== Access ==
U.S. Route 93 extends through the valley's west from Wells, south to the south terminus of the East Humboldt Range, at Warm Creek Ranch; Route 93 continues southeasterly to Currie in Goshute Valley. From the west, Nevada State Route 229 from north Ruby Valley connects to US 93 south of Warm Creek Ranch.

In the northwest, south of Wells, Nevada 232 follows the foothills west of the Slough region, where about fifteen creeks descend from the East Humboldt Range. All other interior valley regions are accessed by unimproved roads. The north perimeter of the valley is approximately where Interstate 80 travels east from Wells.

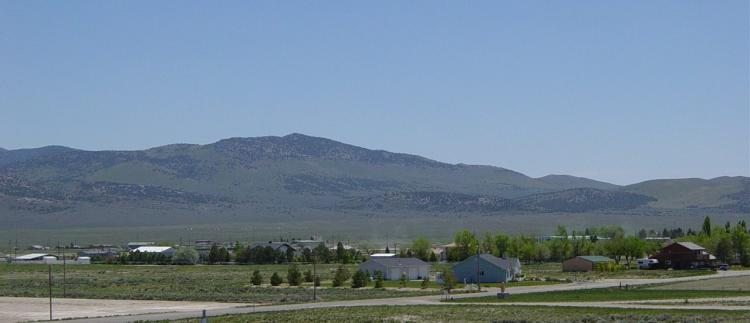
View southeast of Wood Hills from Wells
