= Wells, Nevada =

City in Nevada, United States

- City
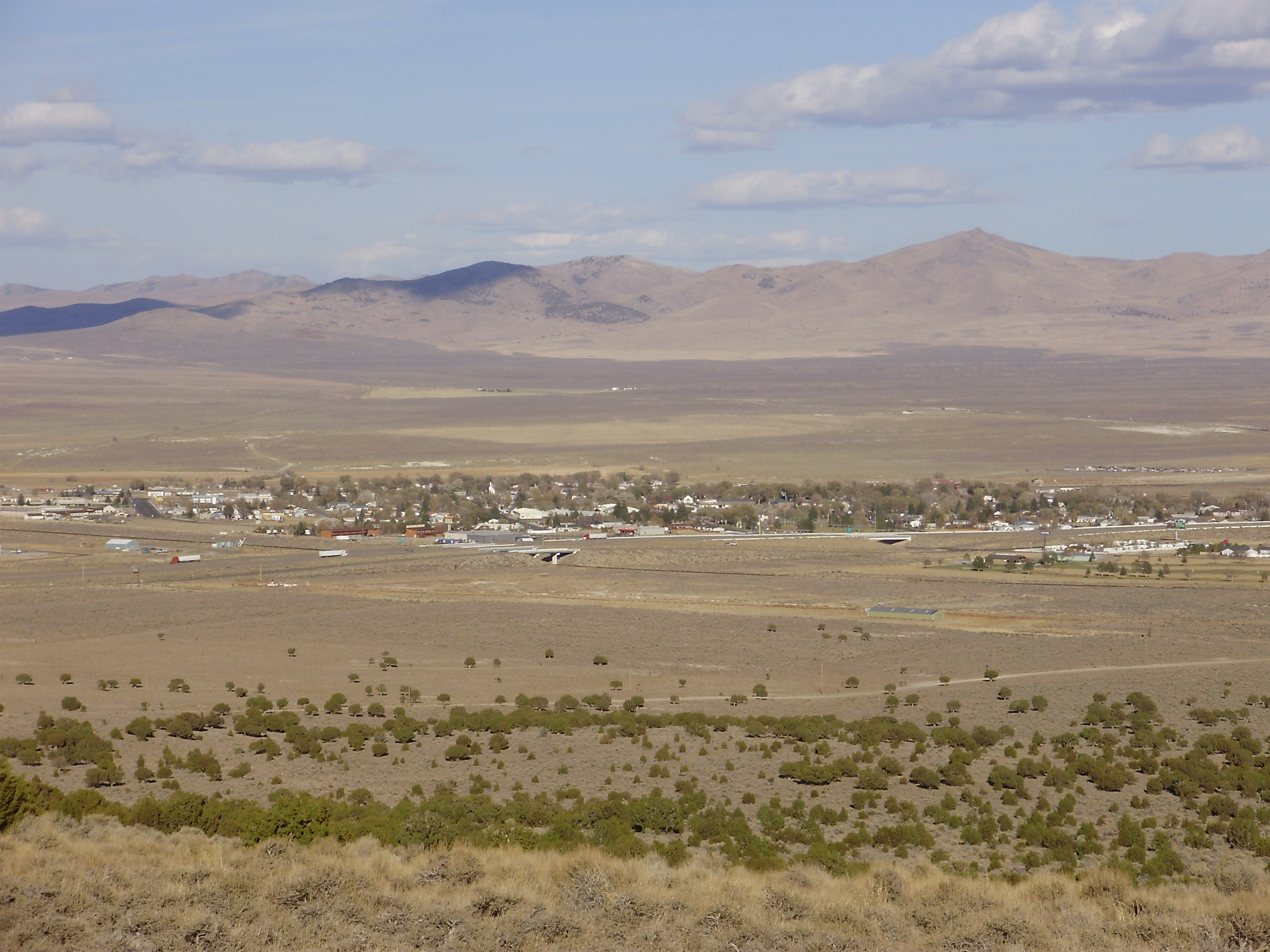
- Wells, Nevada

- Logo

- Location of Elko County in Nevada and location of Wells in Elko County

- Location within Nevada Location within the United States
- Coordinates: 41°07′12″N 114°58′02″W
- Country: United States
- State: Nevada
- County: Elko

Area
  - Total: 6.90 sq mi (17.88 km^{2})
  - Land: 6.90 sq mi (17.88 km^{2})
  - Water: 0 sq mi (0.00 km^{2})
- Elevation: 5,633 ft (1,717 m)

Population (2020)
  - Total: 1,237
  - Density: 179.2/sq mi (69.18/km^{2})
- Time zone: UTC-08:00 (PST)
  - Summer (DST): UTC-07:00 (PDT)
- ZIP code: 89835
- Area code: 775
- FIPS code: 32-83000
- GNIS feature ID: 845730
- Website: https://cityofwellsnv.com

Nevada Historical Marker
- Official name: Humboldt Wells
- Reference no.: 45

Wells is a small city in Elko County, in northeast Nevada in the western United States. As of the 2020 census, Wells had a population of 1,237. Wells is located at the junction of Interstate 80 and U.S. Route 93, approximately 50 miles (80 km) east of Elko and is part of the Elko micropolitan area.

== History ==
The site of Wells began as a place called Humboldt Wells along the trail to California. It was subsequently founded as a railroad town along the original Transcontinental Railroad, and was once a stopover for passenger trains. The Humboldt River has its source in springs and a swampy area just west of the city that today is called Humboldt Wells. In 1877, Humboldt Wells was burning down, and in a frantic plea for help, a telegraph was sent that said, "Wells is burning". After this the town was rebuilt and simply referred to as 'Wells'.

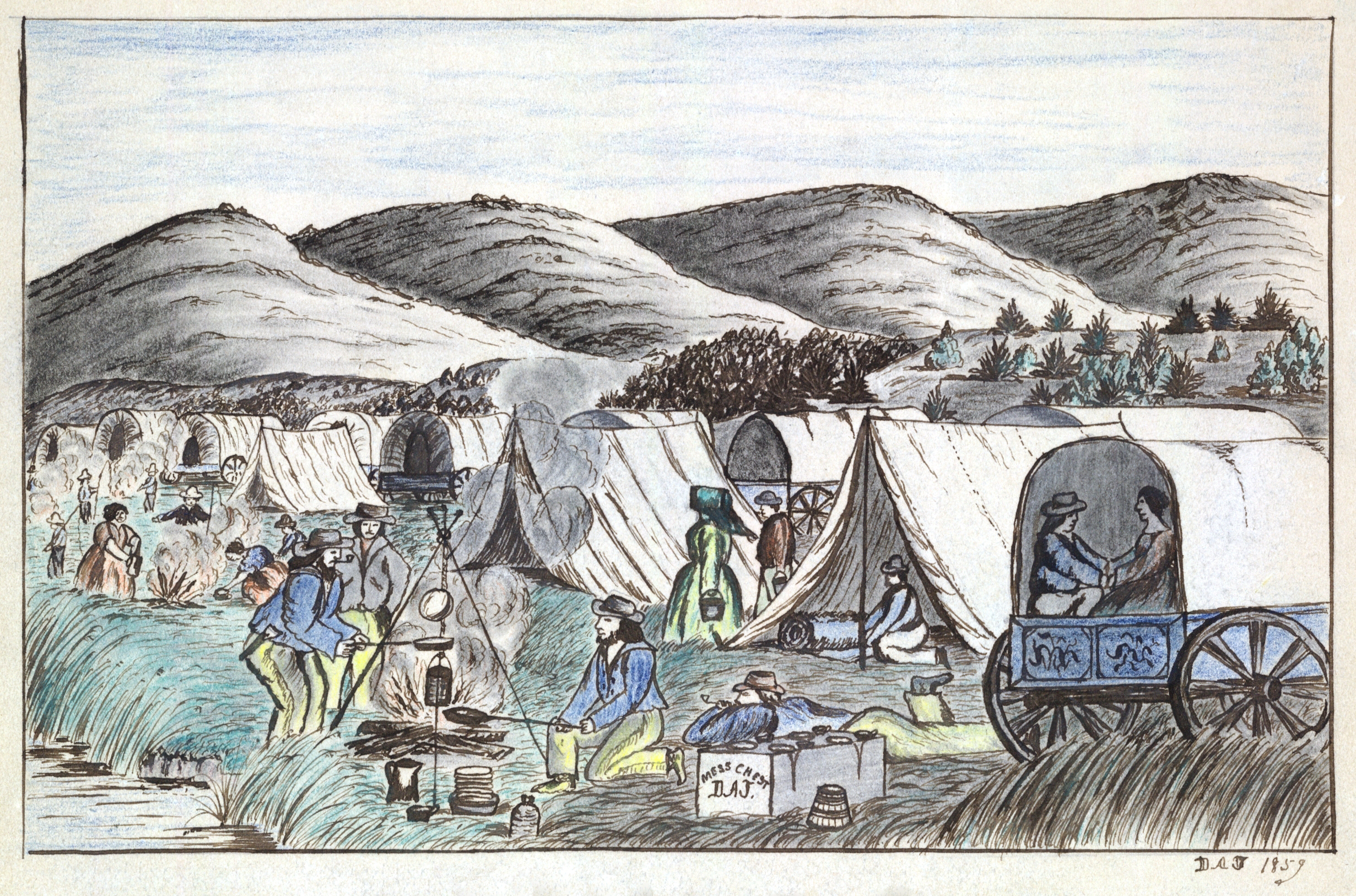
An encampment of tents and covered wagons on the California Trail along the Humboldt River, 1859, at a location near present-day Wells, Nevada. Digitally restored.

A magnitude 6.0 earthquake occurred near Wells at 6:16 A.M. on February 21, 2008. Because of its proximity to the epicenter, Wells experienced significant damage. The earthquake originated 5.6 miles (9.0 km) below the surface, with its epicenter only 12 miles (19 km) distant from Wells, at 41.077 N, 114.752 W.

== Geography ==
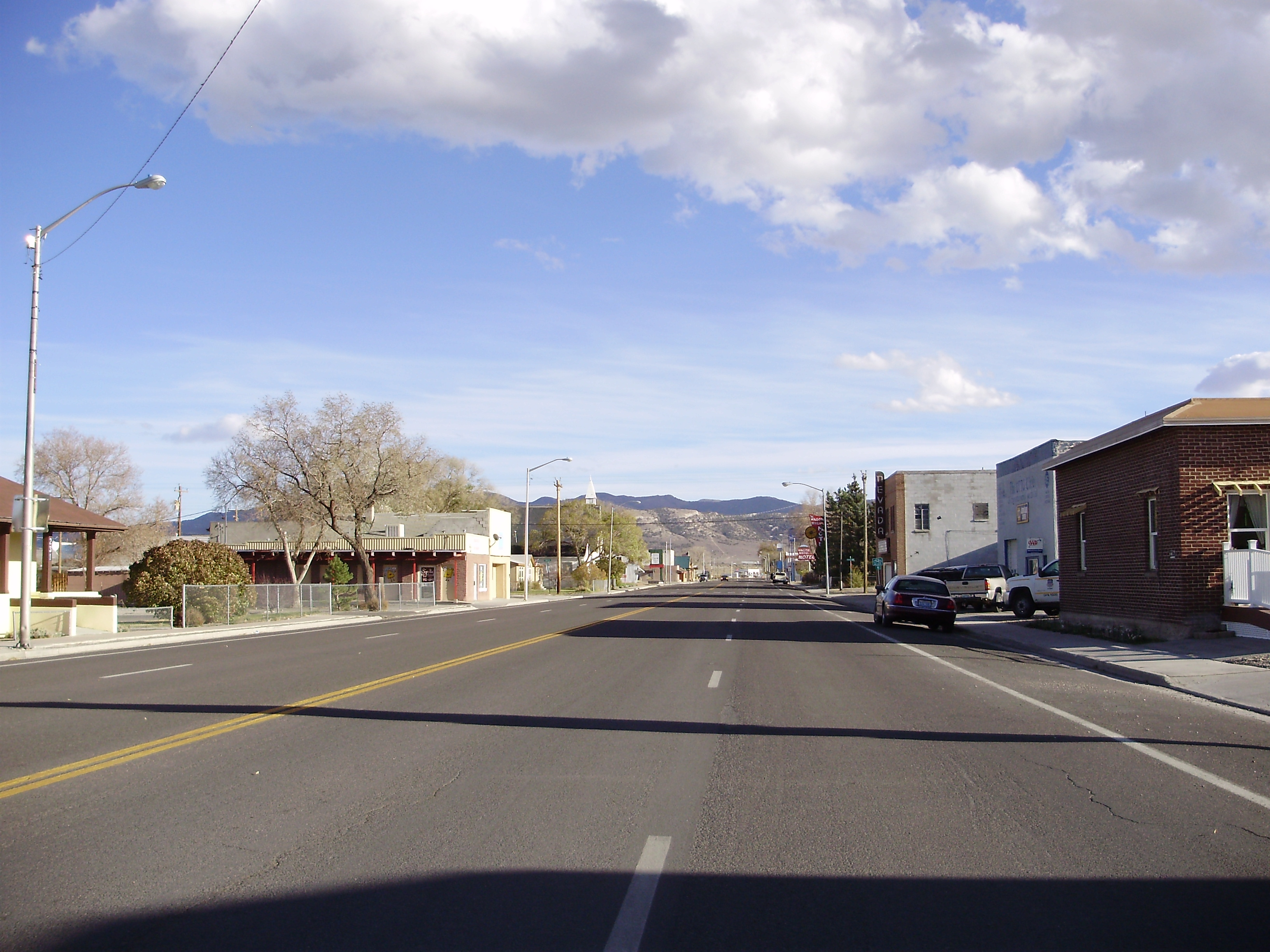
Downtown Wells

According to the United States Census Bureau, the city has a total area of 6.9 square miles (18 km^{2}), all land, at an elevation of 5,630 feet (1,720 m).

Wells is located by the intersection of Interstate 80 and U.S. Route 93.

=== Climate ===
Climate data for Wells, Nevada, 1991–2020 normals, 1895-2020 extremes: 5,700 ft (1,700 m)
Month	Jan	Feb	Mar	Apr	May	Jun	Jul	Aug	Sep	Oct	Nov	Dec	Year
Record high °F (°C)	62 (17)	67 (19)	77 (25)	83 (28)	94 (34)	100 (38)	104 (40)	103 (39)	100 (38)	86 (30)	76 (24)	75 (24)	104 (40)
Mean maximum °F (°C)	49.3 (9.6)	53.1 (11.7)	66.5 (19.2)	75.1 (23.9)	82.8 (28.2)	90.4 (32.4)	96.1 (35.6)	94.0 (34.4)	87.9 (31.1)	78.5 (25.8)	62.9 (17.2)	50.1 (10.1)	90.4 (32.4)
Mean daily maximum °F (°C)	35.8 (2.1)	39.4 (4.1)	49.7 (9.8)	56.9 (13.8)	66.6 (19.2)	77.3 (25.2)	87.8 (31.0)	85.7 (29.8)	75.8 (24.3)	61.9 (16.6)	47.2 (8.4)	37.0 (2.8)	60.1 (15.6)
Daily mean °F (°C)	23.8 (−4.6)	28.2 (−2.1)	36.6 (2.6)	42.5 (5.8)	50.9 (10.5)	59.4 (15.2)	68.8 (20.4)	66.7 (19.3)	57.3 (14.1)	44.9 (7.2)	33.5 (0.8)	24.7 (−4.1)	44.8 (7.1)
Mean daily minimum °F (°C)	11.9 (−11.2)	17.0 (−8.3)	23.5 (−4.7)	28.1 (−2.2)	35.3 (1.8)	41.5 (5.3)	49.9 (9.9)	47.7 (8.7)	38.8 (3.8)	27.8 (−2.3)	19.8 (−6.8)	12.3 (−10.9)	29.5 (−1.4)
Mean minimum °F (°C)	−6.3 (−21.3)	−4.1 (−20.1)	6.2 (−14.3)	13.7 (−10.2)	21.3 (−5.9)	29.1 (−1.6)	36.7 (2.6)	35.7 (2.1)	24.0 (−4.4)	9.8 (−12.3)	−1.3 (−18.5)	−6.8 (−21.6)	−10.6 (−23.7)
Record low °F (°C)	−29 (−34)	−32 (−36)	−19 (−28)	4 (−16)	5 (−15)	16 (−9)	28 (−2)	21 (−6)	6 (−14)	−1 (−18)	−23 (−31)	−36 (−38)	−36 (−38)
Average precipitation inches (mm)	0.84 (21)	0.70 (18)	0.78 (20)	1.13 (29)	1.15 (29)	0.62 (16)	0.38 (9.7)	0.28 (7.1)	0.76 (19)	0.65 (17)	0.88 (22)	0.96 (24)	9.13 (231.8)
Average snowfall inches (cm)	6.5 (17)	8.0 (20)	5.5 (14)	2.7 (6.9)	0.4 (1.0)	0.0 (0.0)	0.0 (0.0)	0.0 (0.0)	0.1 (0.25)	0.8 (2.0)	5.5 (14)	11.9 (30)	41.4 (105.15)
Source 1: NOAA (1981-2010 snowfall)
Source 2: XMACIS2 (records)

== Demographics ==
Historical population
Census	Pop.	Note	%±
1880	243		—
1890	254		4.5%
1900	440		73.2%
1910	598		35.9%
1920	521		−12.9%
1930	655		25.7%
1940	830		26.7%
1950	947		14.1%
1960	1,071		13.1%
1970	1,081		0.9%
1980	1,218		12.7%
1990	1,256		3.1%
2000	1,346		7.2%
2010	1,292		−4.0%
2020	1,237		−4.3%

As of the census of 2000, there were 1,346 people, 525 households, and 352 families residing in the city. The population density was 195.6 inhabitants per square mile (75.5/km^{2}). There were 633 housing units at an average density of 92.0 units per square mile (35.5 units/km^{2}). The racial makeup of the city was 80.24% White, 6.76% Native American, 0.30% Asian, 0.15% Pacific Islander, 9.06% from other races, and 3.49% from two or more races. Hispanic or Latino of any race were 19.47% of the population.

There were 525 households, out of which 35.4% had children under the age of 18 living with them, 52.6% were married couples living together, 9.7% had a female householder with no husband present, and 32.8% were non-families. 28.8% of all households were made up of individuals, and 9.5% had someone living alone who was 65 years of age or older. The average household size was 2.56 and the average family size was 3.14.

In the city, the population was spread out, with 29.3% under the age of 18, 7.6% from 18 to 24, 27.9% from 25 to 44, 25.0% from 45 to 64, and 10.3% who were 65 years of age or older. The median age was 36 years. For every 100 females, there were 107.7 males. For every 100 females age 18 and over, there were 106.5 males.

The median income for a household in the city was $35,870, and the median income for a family was $41,827. Males had a median income of $31,250 versus $20,852 for females. The per capita income for the city was $16,835. About 8.6% of families and 11.9% of the population were below the poverty line, including 18.9% of those under age 18 and 2.1% of those age 65 or over.

== Education ==
Public education in Wells is administered by Elko County School District. The district operates one elementary school and Wells High School.

Wells has a public library, a branch of the Elko-Lander-Eureka County Library System.

== Notable people ==
- Mae Caine, suffragist and women's rights activist, civic leader, and government official
