= Grass Valley =

Grass Valley may refer to:

- Grass valley, a meadow in a forested drainage basin

== Places ==
=== Australia ===
- Grass Valley, Western Australia

=== United States ===
- Grass Valley, California, a city in Nevada County
- Grass Valley, Oakland, California, a neighborhood
- Grass Valley, Nevada, census-designated place in Pershing County
- Grass Valley (Eureka and Lander counties, Nevada), a valley
- Grass Valley (Pershing and Humboldt counties, Nevada), a valley
- Grass Valley, Oregon, a city in Sherman County
- Grass Valley (Piute and Sevier counties, Utah), a valley
- Grass Valley Wilderness, in the Mojave Desert

== Other uses ==
- Grass Valley (company), a television and film technology company

== See also ==
- Roman Catholic Diocese of Grass Valley, United States
- Grass Valley speckled dace, an extinct species of fish
- Little Grass Valley, California, a census-designated place in Plumas County
