= List of state routes in Nevada shorter than one mile =

State routes in Nevada shorter than one mile
- State: State Route X (SR X)

System links
- Nevada State Highway System; Interstate; US; State; Pre‑1976; Scenic

The following is a list of state routes in Nevada shorter than one mile (1.6 km) in length. Most of these highways are short state-maintained sections of longer urban streets, old alignments of more prominent highways, or connectors between one or more highways.

== List of highways ==
Number	Length (mi)	Length (km)	Southern or western terminus	Northern or eastern terminus	Formed	Removed
SR 171	0.639	1.028	I-215 in Las Vegas	Sunset Road/McCarran Airport tunnel in Las Vegas	1994	current
SR 224	0.90	1.45	US 93 Alt. in West Wendover	Utah state line on UT 58 in Wendover, Utah	1976	1993
SR 426	0.370	0.595	US 395 Alt. in Reno	I-580 / US 395 in Reno	1976	current
SR 578	0.661	1.064	I-15 in Las Vegas	Las Vegas Blvd in Las Vegas	1976	current
SR 591	0.242	0.389	Aldebaran Drive in Las Vegas	Highland Drive in Las Vegas	1976	c. 2008
SR 594	0.723	1.164	Polaris Ave in Las Vegas	Las Vegas Blvd in Las Vegas	1976	c. 2019
SR 602	0.253	0.407	Stewart Avenue in Las Vegas	Bonanza Road in Las Vegas	1976	current
SR 646	0.090	0.145	0.090 miles west of McCarran Blvd in Sparks	McCarran Blvd in Sparks	1976	2010
SR 653	0.589	0.948	SR 667 in Reno	Terminal Way in Reno	1976	current
SR 657	0.180	0.290	0.18 mi south of McCarran Blvd in Reno	McCarran Blvd in Reno	1976	c. 2008
SR 660	0.865	1.392	11th Street in Reno	SR 430 in Reno	1976	2011
SR 668	0.314	0.505	Hymer Ave in Sparks	Victorian Ave in Sparks	1976	current
SR 673	0.395	0.636	N. Virginia St north of Reno	US 395 north of Reno	1983	current
SR 686	0.105	0.169	Enterprise Road in Reno	McCarran Blvd in Reno	1976	c. 2006
SR 705	0.928	1.493	Clear Creek Road south of Carson City		1976	current
SR 739	0.218	0.351	I-15 south of Las Vegas	Las Vegas Blvd south of Las Vegas	1976	2010
SR 760	0.475	0.764	Nevada Beach on Lake Tahoe	US 50 near Zephyr Cove	1976	current
SR 781	0.039	0.063	Palisade bridge southwest of Carlin	Palisade bridge southwest of Carlin	1976	current
SR 787	0.497	0.800	US 95 in Winnemucca	SR 294 in Winnemucca	1997	current
SR 816	0.610	0.982	County Airport Road west of Panaca	US 93 west of Panaca	1976	current
SR 822	0.146	0.235	US 50 in Dayton	Ricci Road in Dayton	1976	current
SR 825	0.415	0.668	West of Day Lane near Smith	SR 824 at Smith	1976	current
SR 858	0.546	0.879	I-80 / US 95 northeast of Oreana	I-80 frontage road	1976	2013
SR 859	0.331	0.533	I-80 at Imlay	Imlay	1976	c. 2001
SR 880	0.621	0.999	Malapai Way in Sparks	SR 445 in Sparks	1976	current
Former

== State Route 171 ==
State Route 171
- Location: Paradise
- Length: 0.685 mi (1,102 m)
- Existed: 1994–present

The Harry Reid Airport Connector is a limited-access roadway system located in Paradise, an unincorporated town in the Las Vegas Valley, Clark County, Nevada, United States. Composed of State Route 171 (SR 171), the Airport Tunnel and arterial streets, the airport connector provides vehicular access to the passenger terminals at McCarran International Airport. Despite being completely owned by Clark County, the first 0.685 miles (1.102 km) of the McCarran Airport Connector is maintained by NDOT as unsigned SR 171, while the remaining section is maintained by Clark County.

== State Route 224 ==
State Route 224
- Location: West Wendover
- Length: 0.90 mi (1,450 m)
- Existed: 1976–1993

Between July 1976 and 1993, State Route 224 (SR 224) was concurrent with Interstate 80 Business (BL-80) in Nevada. BL-80 is an unofficial business loop of Interstate 80 (I-80) that is 2.26 miles (3.64 km) long and serves as the main street for the US cities of West Wendover, Nevada, and Wendover, Utah, along a roadway named Wendover Boulevard. Wendover Boulevard was originally part of U.S. Route 40 (US 40), which connected California to New Jersey via Nevada and Utah. A portion of the Nevada segment is concurrent with U.S. Route 93 Alternate (US 93 Alt.), and the entire portion in Utah is coterminous with State Route 58. The Nevada Department of Transportation (Nevada DOT) applied for the business loop designation in the early 1980s but the designation has never been approved; nevertheless, signs are posted in both states.

== State Route 426 ==
State Route 426
- Location: Reno
- Length: 0.370 mi (595 m)
- Existed: c. 1976–present

State Route 426 (SR 426) is a short, unsigned state highway in the South Meadows area of Reno in Washoe County, Nevada. It comprises a short segment of South Meadows Parkway.

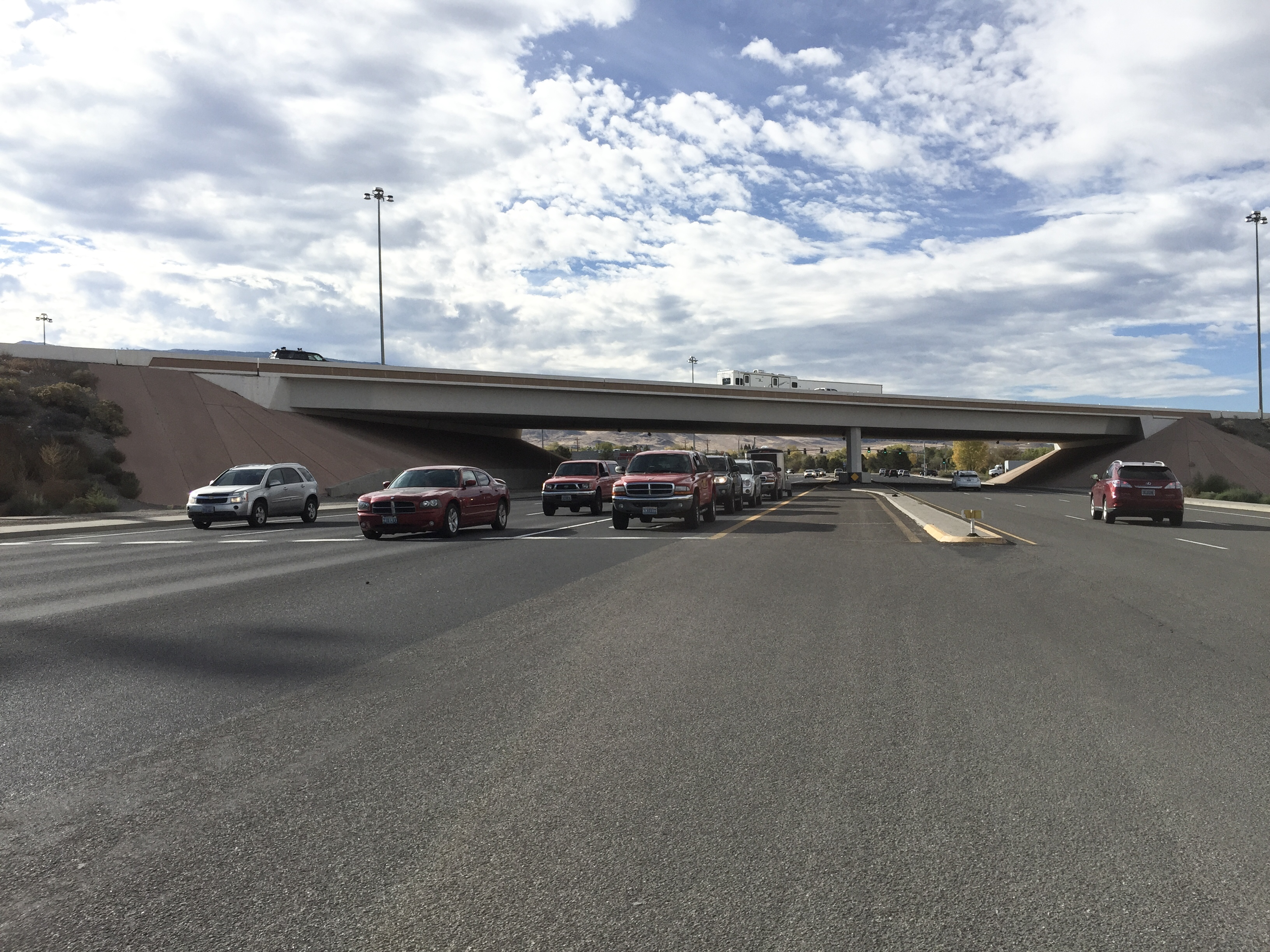
View from the east end of SR 426 looking westbound

SR 426 begins at the intersection of South Meadows Parkway and S. Virginia Street (U.S. Route 395 Alternate and U.S. Route 395 Business) in Reno. From there, it heads east along South Meadows Parkway for 0.370 miles (0.595 km) to its terminus just east of its interchange with Interstate 580 and U.S. Route 395 at the northbound freeway ramps.

Although the state highway section is short, South Meadows Parkway extends further east to serve growing commercial and residential areas of south Reno. Additionally, the road continues southwest past Virginia Street as Foothill Road, providing access to more residential communities.

The entire route is in Reno, Washoe County.

mi	km	Destinations	Notes
0.000	0.000	US 395 Alt. (S. Virginia Street) / US 395 Bus.	Former SR 430/US 395
0.370	0.595	I-580 / US 395 – Carson City, Susanville	Interchange; I-580 exit 28
1.000 mi = 1.609 km; 1.000 km = 0.621 mi

== State Route 578 ==
State Route 578
- Location: Las Vegas
- Length: 0.661 mi (1,064 m)
- Existed: 1976–present

State Route 578 (SR 578) is a short state highway in Clark County, Nevada. It comprises a 0.661-mile (1.064 km) portion of Washington Avenue in Las Vegas.

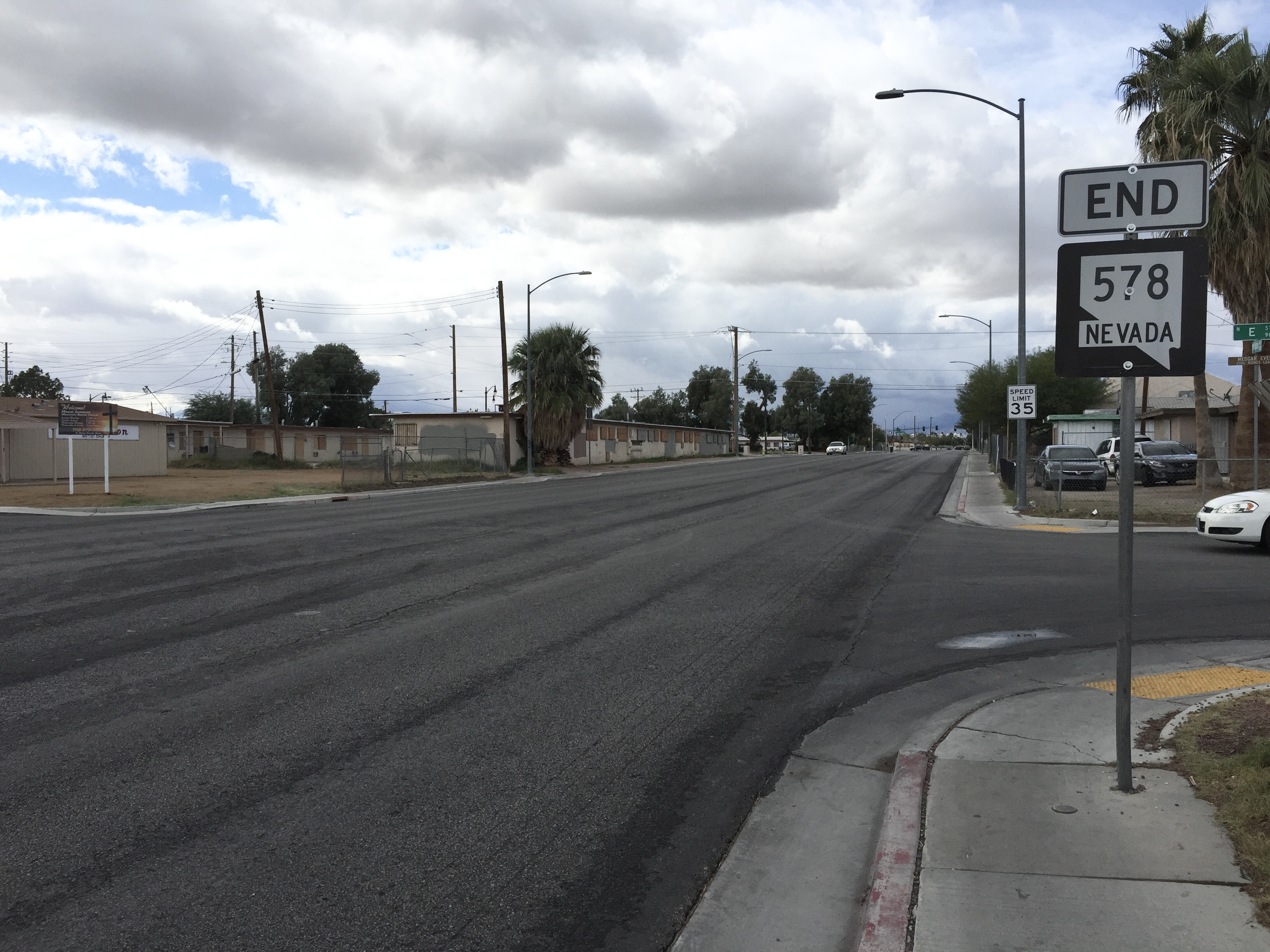
View at the west end of SR 578 looking westbound in 2015

State Route 578 begins at the Interstate 15 (I-15) and U.S. Route 93 (US 93) interchange with Washington Avenue, D Street and City Parkway (exits 43 and 44). From there, it follows Washington Avenue eastward, traveling under the Union Pacific Railroad tracks to intersect Main Street. SR 578 passes by the southern Nevada district headquarters of the Nevada Department of Transportation as it heads eastward. The route comes to an end at the Washington Avenue intersection with Las Vegas Boulevard (former SR 604). Located at the intersection of SR 578's eastern terminus are the Grant Sawyer Building (a southern Nevada state office complex), Cashman Center and Cashman Field (home to the Las Vegas Lights FC soccer team) and the Old Las Vegas Mormon Fort State Historic Park (the first permanent settlement in the Las Vegas area).

RTC Transit Routes 104, 119, 208, and 214 function on this road.

SR 578 was established in the 1976 renumbering of Nevada's state highways. The route was designated on July 1, 1976.

The entire route is in Las Vegas, Clark County.

mi	km	Destinations	Notes
27.00	43.45	I-15 / US 93 – Los Angeles, Ely, Salt Lake City	Interchange; western terminus; I-15 exits 43 and 44
27.66	44.51	Las Vegas Boulevard	Eastern terminus; former SR 604/US 91/US 93
1.000 mi = 1.609 km; 1.000 km = 0.621 mi

== State Route 591 ==
State Route 591
- Location: Las Vegas
- Length: 0.242 mi (389 m)
- Existed: 1976–2008

State Route 591 (SR 591) was a state highway that comprised a 0.242-mile (0.389 km) section of Spring Mountain Road at Interstate 15.

SR 591 began at the intersection of Spring Mountain Road and Aldebaran Avenue. From there, it proceeded east under Interstate 15 and terminated near Highland Drive. Highland Drive intersects Spring Mountain Road in the form of a ramp from southbound Highland to westbound Spring Mountain, underneath I-15.

As of January 2008, SR 591 had been decommissioned. Although not maintained as a state route, Nevada DOT still maintains the former highway as a frontage road (FR CL 51).

== State Route 594 ==
State Route 594
- Location: Las Vegas
- Length: 0.723 mi (1,164 m)
- Existed: 1976–2019

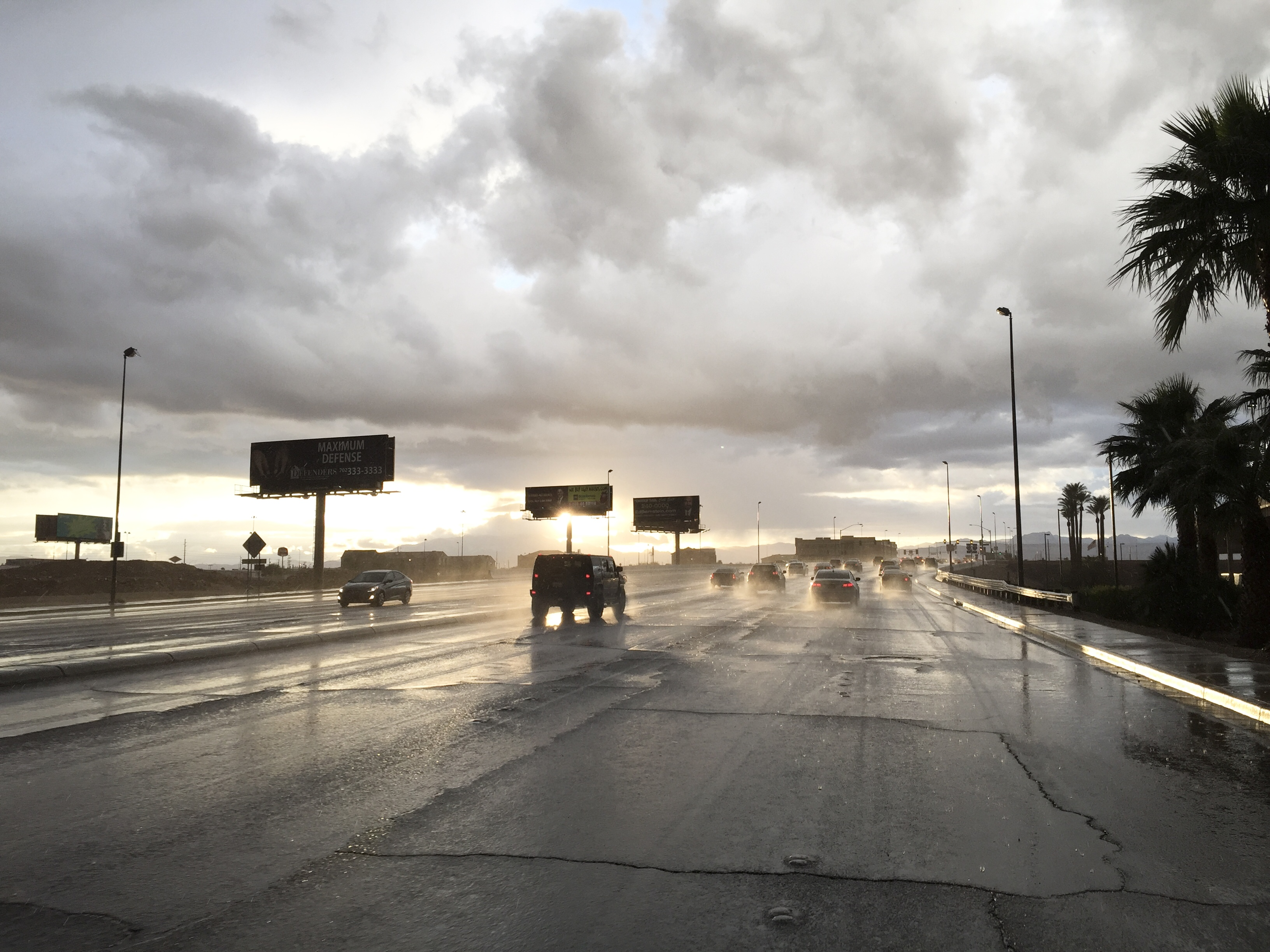
View west along SR 594 in 2015

State Route 594 (SR 594) was a state highway which comprised approximately 0.723 miles (1.164 km) of Russell Road. SR 594 began at Polaris Avenue as a six-lane city street, and extended easterly to meet Interstate 15 at a diamond interchange. The state highway portion of the road continued east and intersected Frank Sinatra Drive to the south before ending at an intersection with Las Vegas Boulevard.

The Nevada Department of Transportation (NDOT) removed SR 594 from its maintenance logs by the beginning of 2019, and has begun the process of turning ownership of the roadway over to Clark County.

The entire route was in Paradise, Clark County.

mi	km	Destinations	Notes
0.00	0.00	Polaris Avenue	
0.30	0.48	I-15 – Los Angeles, Salt Lake City	I-15 exits 35 and 36
0.723	1.164	Las Vegas Boulevard	Former SR 604/US 91/US 466
1.000 mi = 1.609 km; 1.000 km = 0.621 mi

== State Route 602 ==
State Route 602
- Location: Las Vegas
- Length: 0.253 mi (407 m)
- Existed: c. 1976–present

State Route 602 (SR 602) is a short state highway in Clark County, Nevada. Located entirely within the downtown area of Las Vegas, it comprises a small section of Casino Center Boulevard. The route was previously a part of State Route 5B. The highway now primarily serves as a connection between State Route 579 and Interstate 11.

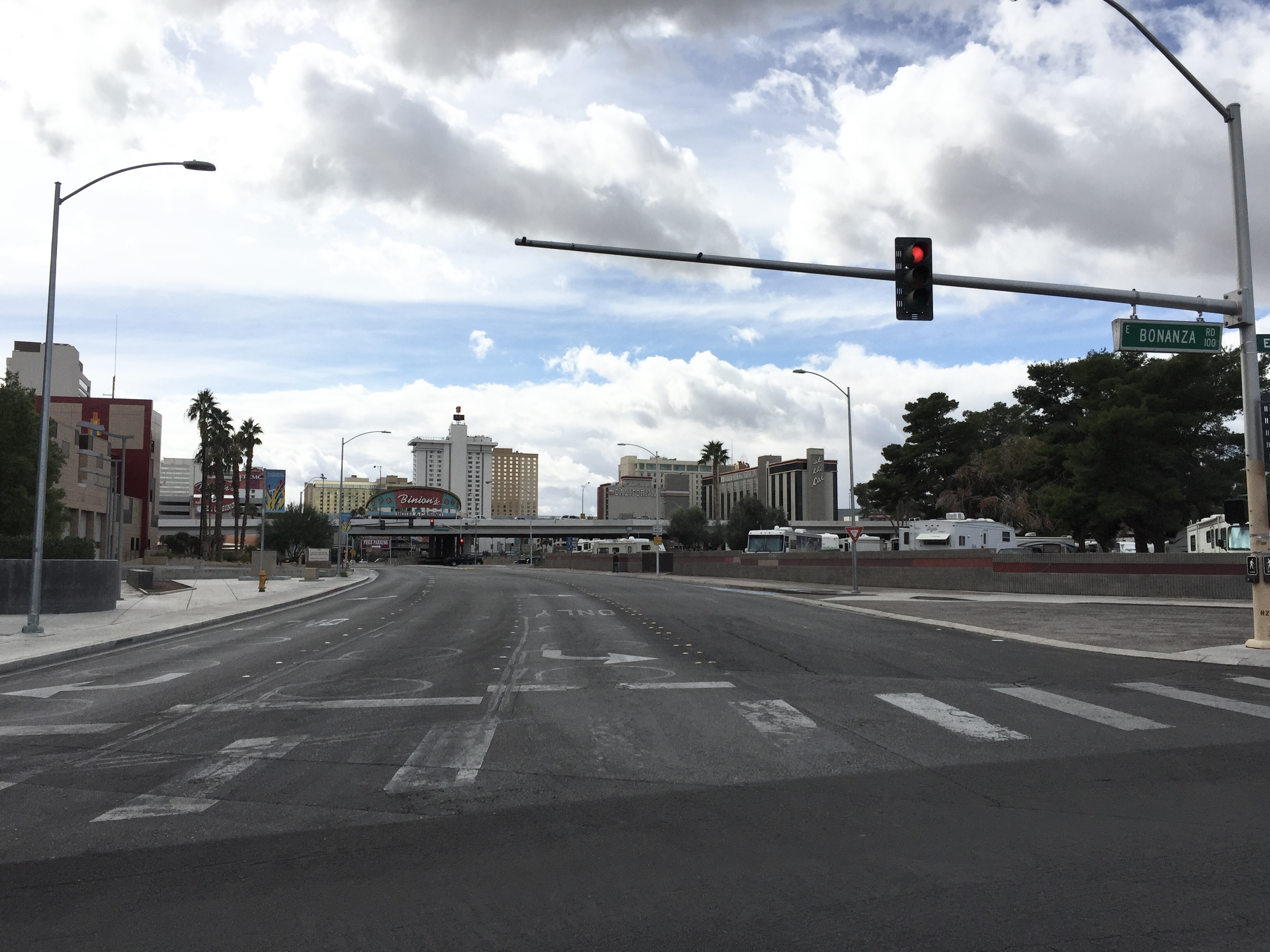
View at the north end of SR 602 looking southbound in 2015

State Route 602 begins at the intersection of Bonanza Road (SR 579) and Casino Center Boulevard near the downtown core of Las Vegas. From there, the route heads south along Casino Center Boulevard, passing underneath the Interstate 11/U.S. Route 93/U.S. Route 95 freeway. Casino Center becomes a one-way street southbound as it passes under the freeway, feeding into the downtown casino district. SR 602 ends at the Casino Center Boulevard intersection with Stewart Avenue.

Casino Center Boulevard was previously part of former State Route 5B, a route that had been established by 1952. SR 5B followed what was then Second Street, from Bonanza Road (then SR 5A) south past Stewart Avenue to end at Fremont Street (which was SR 5, SR 6 and possibly US 91 and US 93 at the time), a distance of approximately 0.43 miles (0.69 km).

The SR 5B designation was eliminated in the 1976 renumbering of Nevada's state highways. Presumably, State Route 602 was assigned at that time.

The entire route is in Las Vegas, Clark County.

mi	km	Destinations	Notes
		SR 579 (Bonanza Road)	
		I-11 north / US 93 north / US 95 north – Reno, Ely	Entrance only
		Through southbound traffic prohibited between I-11 ramps	
		I-11 south / US 93 south / US 95 south	Exit only to southbound Casino Center Boulevard
		Stewart Avenue	
1.000 mi = 1.609 km; 1.000 km = 0.621 mi: Incomplete access

== State Route 646 ==
State Route 646
- Location: Sparks
- Length: 0.090 mi (145 m) State route length in 2010.
- Existed: 1976–2010

State Route 646 (SR 646) was a very short state highway in Washoe County, Nevada. Previously part of State Route 32A, the route was turned over to local control by 2011. SR 646 comprised an extremely short segment of Prater Way in the city of Sparks. It began 0.09 miles (0.14 km) west of the intersection of North McCarran Boulevard (SR 659) and ran east along Prater Way to end at the McCarran Boulevard intersection.

The route was previously part of the former State Route 32A, a longer route that ran along Prater Way from Victorian Avenue (former U.S. Route 40) to McCarran Boulevard. SR 32A likely became SR 646 with the renumbering of Nevada's state highways in 1976. State Route 646 was removed from Nevada's state highway system by January 2011.

== State Route 653 ==
State Route 653
- Location: Reno
- Length: 0.589 mi (948 m)
- Existed: 1976–present

State Route 653 (SR 653) is an east–west state highway in Washoe County, Nevada, serving the city of Reno.

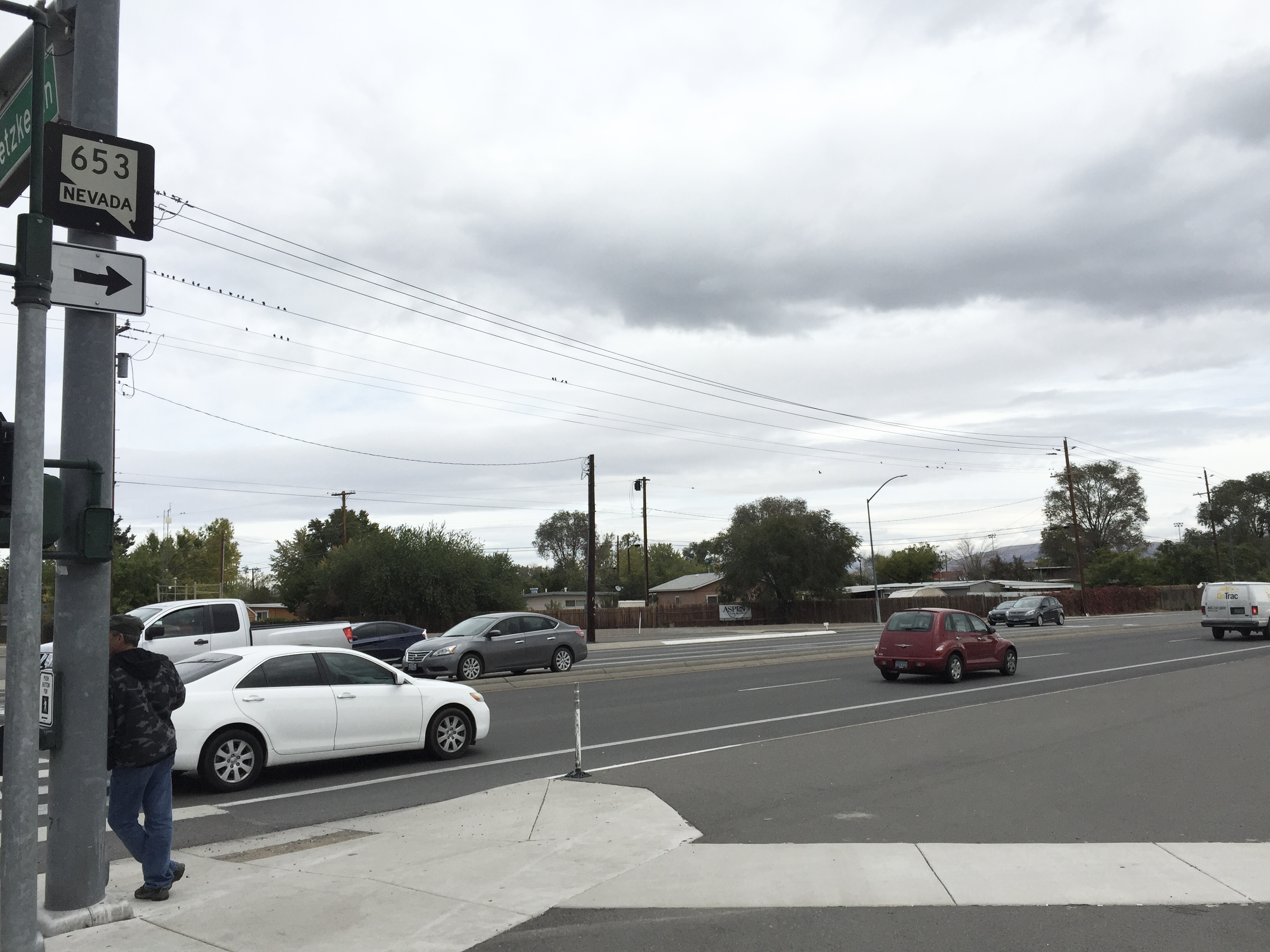
The western end of SR 653

SR 653 begins at the intersection of Plumb Lane and Kietzke Lane (SR 667) in Reno, and proceeds east along Plumb Lane to end at the intersection with Terminal Way at the entrance to the Reno–Tahoe International Airport.

As late as 2006, the western terminus of SR 653 was at the intersection of Plumb Lane and S. Virginia Street (Business US 395; former SR 430). The route was truncated as of 2008.

The entire route is in Reno, Washoe County.

mi	km	Destinations	Notes
		SR 667 (Kietzke Lane)	
		I-580 / US 395 – Carson City, Susanville	Interchange; I-580 exit 33
		Terminal Way	Reno–Tahoe International Airport entrance
1.000 mi = 1.609 km; 1.000 km = 0.621 mi

== State Route 657 ==
State Route 657
- Location: Reno
- Length: 0.18 mi (290 m)
- Existed: 1976–2008

State Route 657 (SR 657) was a state highway in Reno, Nevada that followed a portion of Keystone Avenue. SR 657 was turned over to local control in 2008.

SR 657 was established on July 1, 1976, as part of the 1976 renumbering of Nevada's state highway system. It previously comprised a significant portion of Keystone Avenue, with a routing that extended from the road's SPUI interchange with Interstate 80 north to North McCarran Boulevard (SR 651). The route may have extended as far south as California Avenue at one time.

By 2001, SR 657 had been truncated to the northernmost 0.18 miles (0.29 km) near McCarran Boulevard. This short segment was removed from the state highway system by January 2008.

== State Route 660 ==
State Route 660
- Location: Reno
- Length: 0.867 mi (1,395 m)
- Existed: 1976–2011

State Route 660 (SR 660) was a state highway in Reno, Nevada. Prior to its being turned over to local control in 2011, the route encompassed the Sierra Street bridge over Interstate 80 near downtown Reno. SR 660 comprised portions of former State Route 33A.

By the early 2000s, SR 660 ran along Sierra Street from 11th Street to State Route 430 (U.S. 395 Business; Virginia Street).

Control of the Sierra Street bridge was relinquished to the City of Reno on January 11, 2011. SR 660 was completely retired from the state highway system at that time.

== State Route 668 ==
State Route 668
- Location: Sparks
- Length: 0.314 mi (505 m)
- Existed: 1976–present

State Route 668 (SR 668) is a short state highway in Washoe County, Nevada. It runs along a small section of Rock Boulevard in Sparks.

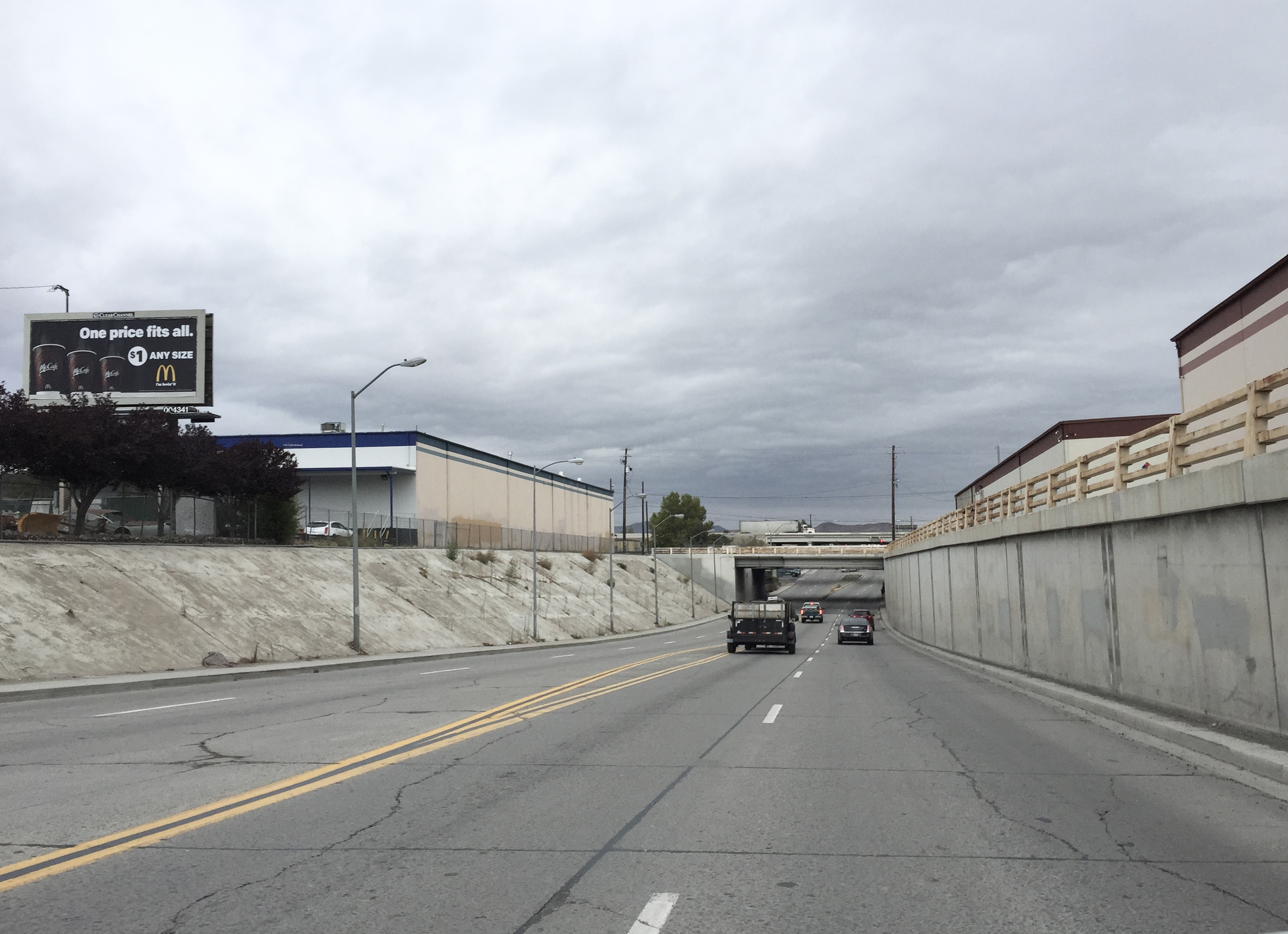
View north along SR 668

State Route 668 begins at the intersection of South Rock Boulevard and Hymer Avenue in an industrial business section of Sparks. The route heads north from there along Rock Boulevard, passing underneath the Union Pacific railroad tracks and interchanging with Interstate 80 (I-80). SR 668 ends after 0.314 miles (0.505 km), at its intersection with Victorian Avenue (I-80 Business).

The route was created on July 1, 1976, during the renumbering of Nevada's state highways.

The entire route is in Sparks, Washoe County.

mi	km	Destinations	Notes
0.000	0.000	Hymer Avenue	Southern terminus
		I-80 – Elko, Sacramento	
0.314	0.505	I-80 BL (Victorian Avenue)	Northern terminus
1.000 mi = 1.609 km; 1.000 km = 0.621 mi

== State Route 673 ==
State Route 673
- Location: Near Reno
- Length: 0.395 mi (636 m)
- Existed: 1983–present

State Route 673 (SR 673) is a short, unsigned state highway in Washoe County, Nevada. It runs along a short section of Stead Boulevard providing access to the area of Reno known as Stead.

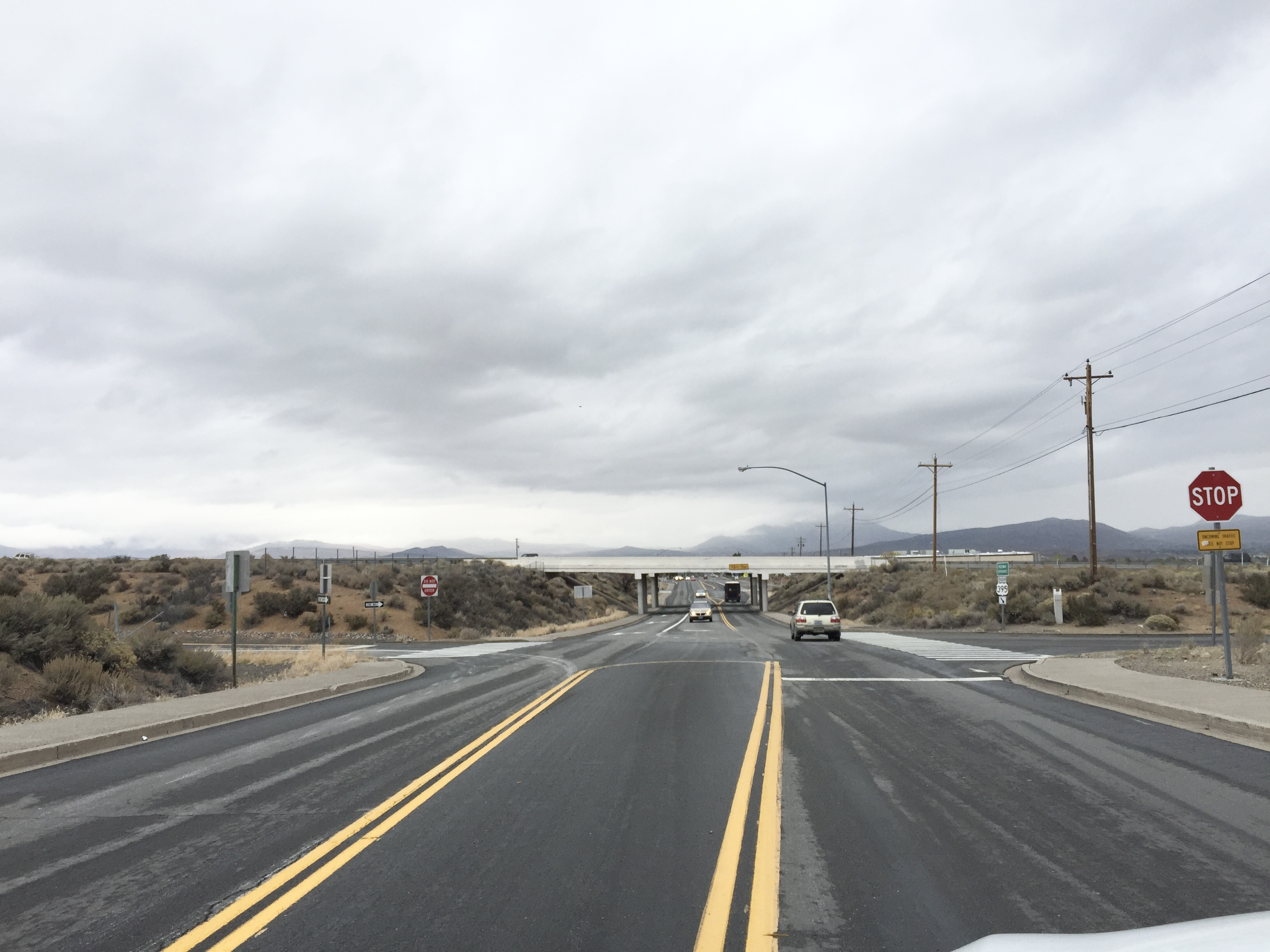
View north along SR 673

SR 673 begins at the intersection of North Virginia Street (old US 395) northwest of Reno near Stead. The route heads north along Stead Boulevard, passing underneath U.S. Route 395 freeway and ending just past the interchange. Access to the Reno-Stead Airport is located further north along Stead Boulevard.

The SR 673 designation was originally applied on April 27, 1983.

The entire route is in Reno, Washoe County.

mi	km	Destinations	Notes
0.00	0.00	North Virginia Street	Old US 395
		US 395 – Reno, Susanville	
		Stead Boulevard	Continuation beyond route terminus
1.000 mi = 1.609 km; 1.000 km = 0.621 mi

== State Route 686 ==
State Route 686
- Location: Reno
- Length: 0.105 mi (169 m)
- Existed: c. 1976–2002

State Route 686 (SR 686) was a very short state highway in Washoe County, Nevada. It ran from Enterprise Road near the University of Nevada, Reno (UNR) north to North McCarran Boulevard (SR 651) along Evans Avenue. The route was turned over to local control by January 2006.

== State Route 705 ==
State Route 705
- Location: Clear Creek Road south of Carson City
- Length: 0.928 mi (1,493 m)
- Existed: 2000–present
- History: Road established by 1928; Lincoln Highway & US 50 c. 1930s–1950s

State Route 705 (SR 705) is a short 0.928-mile-long (1.493 km) state highway in Douglas County, Nevada. The route follows a portion of Clear Creek Road just south of Carson City. The route was once part of the Lincoln Highway, forming a major travel link between Carson City and Lake Tahoe. SR 705 was designated in 2000, and was only truncated once.

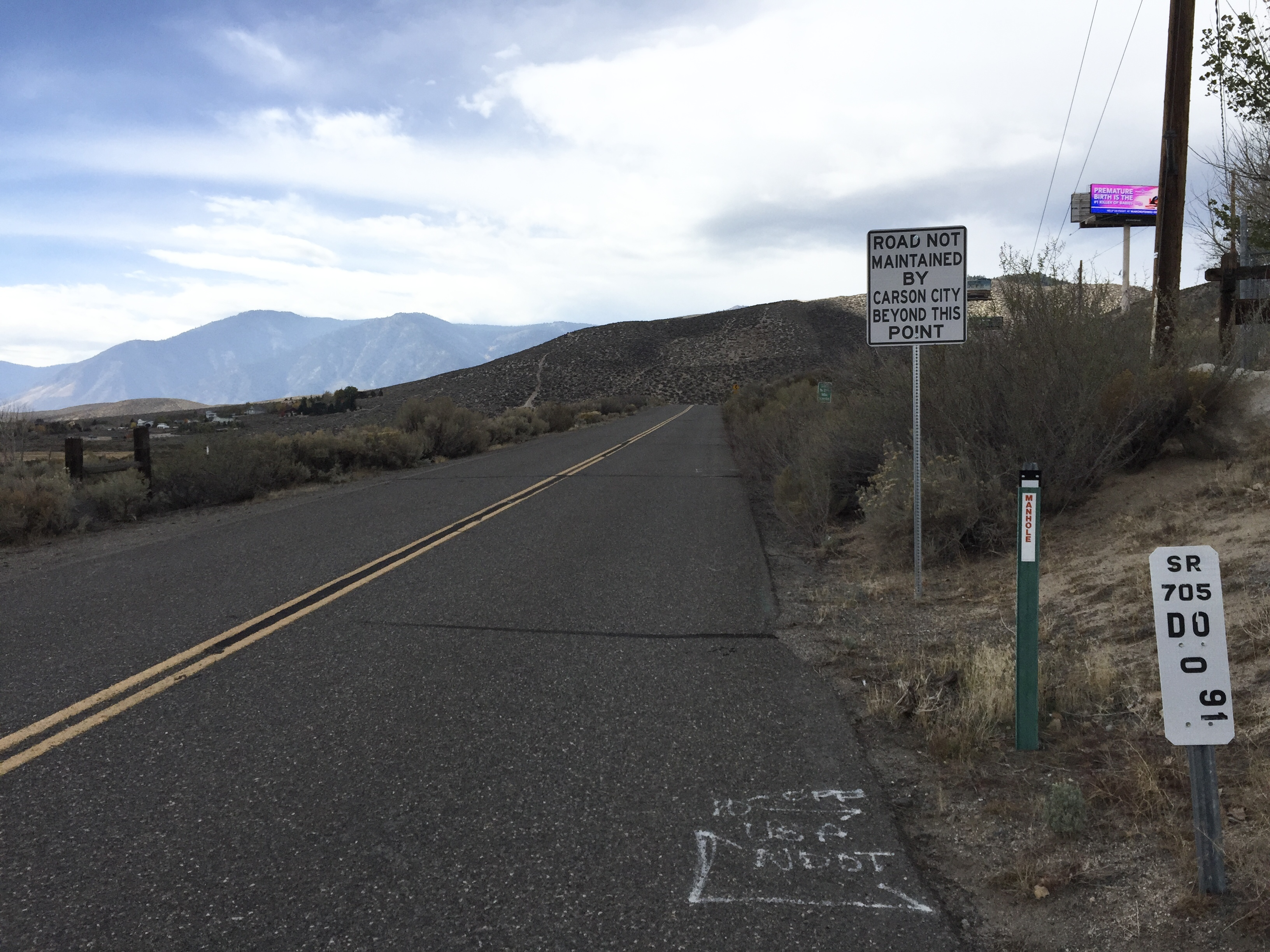
View at the east end of SR 705 looking westbound

SR 705 begins in Douglas County at the Carson City/Douglas County line southwest Carson City on Clear Creek Road (shown on some maps as "Old Clear Creek Road"), just north of Clear Creek. The state-maintained highway follows Clear Creek Road eastward along the course of Clear Creek for nearly one mile. The road bends around desert hills, and the route (SR 705) ends at the Douglas County/Carson City line, but the road continues eastward to an intersection with U.S. Route 395 (US 395). SR 705 is currently not directly connected to the remainder of Nevada's state highway system.

Trails connecting Lake Tahoe with the Comstock Lode mining region near Carson City had been established in the mid-1800s, with the first wagon road route through Kings Canyon to the north having been constructed by November 1863. This route was eventually selected to become part of the Lincoln Highway and, later, a branch of SR 3.

The advent of the automobile greatly changed this region of Nevada. From 1927 to 1928, aided by both state and forest highway funding, a graded two-lane road was constructed along the corridor of Clear Creek to connect Carson City to Spooner Summit, just east of Glenbrook on the eastern shore of Lake Tahoe. The Clear Creek Road replaced the former Kings Canyon route as the major road to Lake Tahoe in 1928, and was subsequently selected as a later realignment of the Lincoln Highway. Clear Creek Road later became part of US 50, but was bypassed in the 1950s by the current four-lane alignment located a short distance to the north.

Clear Creek Road remained largely unchanged since it was established. The Nevada Department of Transportation initially designated SR 705, from the current western terminus east to a Bureau of Indian Affairs water diversion box in Carson City, by January 11, 2000. By the beginning of 2006, the short portion with Carson City had been removed from state maintenance, resulting in the current highway segment in Douglas County.

The entire route is in Douglas County.

Location	mi	km	Destinations	Notes
	0.000	0.000	Clear Creek Road	Continuation beyond western terminus
	0.928	1.493	Clear Creek Road	Continuation beyond eastern terminus
1.000 mi = 1.609 km; 1.000 km = 0.621 mi

== State Route 739 ==
State Route 739
- Location: Las Vegas
- Length: 0.218 mi (351 m)
- Existed: c. 1976–2010

State Route 739 (SR 739) was a short state highway in Clark County, Nevada that provided access to the town of Sloan south of the Las Vegas Valley. The route is no longer a state highway. The route followed a 0.22-mile (0.35 km) portion of Sloan Road that ran from the western Interstate 15 right-of-way east to Las Vegas Boulevard.

SR 739 was deleted from the state highway system on June 7, 2010. However, the route is still maintained by the Nevada Department of Transportation as a frontage road.

== State Route 760 ==
State Route 760
- Location: Douglas County
- Length: 0.475 mi (764 m)
- Existed: 1976–present

State Route 760 (SR 760) is a short state highway in Douglas County, Nevada, United States. It connects Nevada Beach to U.S. Route 50 (US 50). The route was established in 1976.

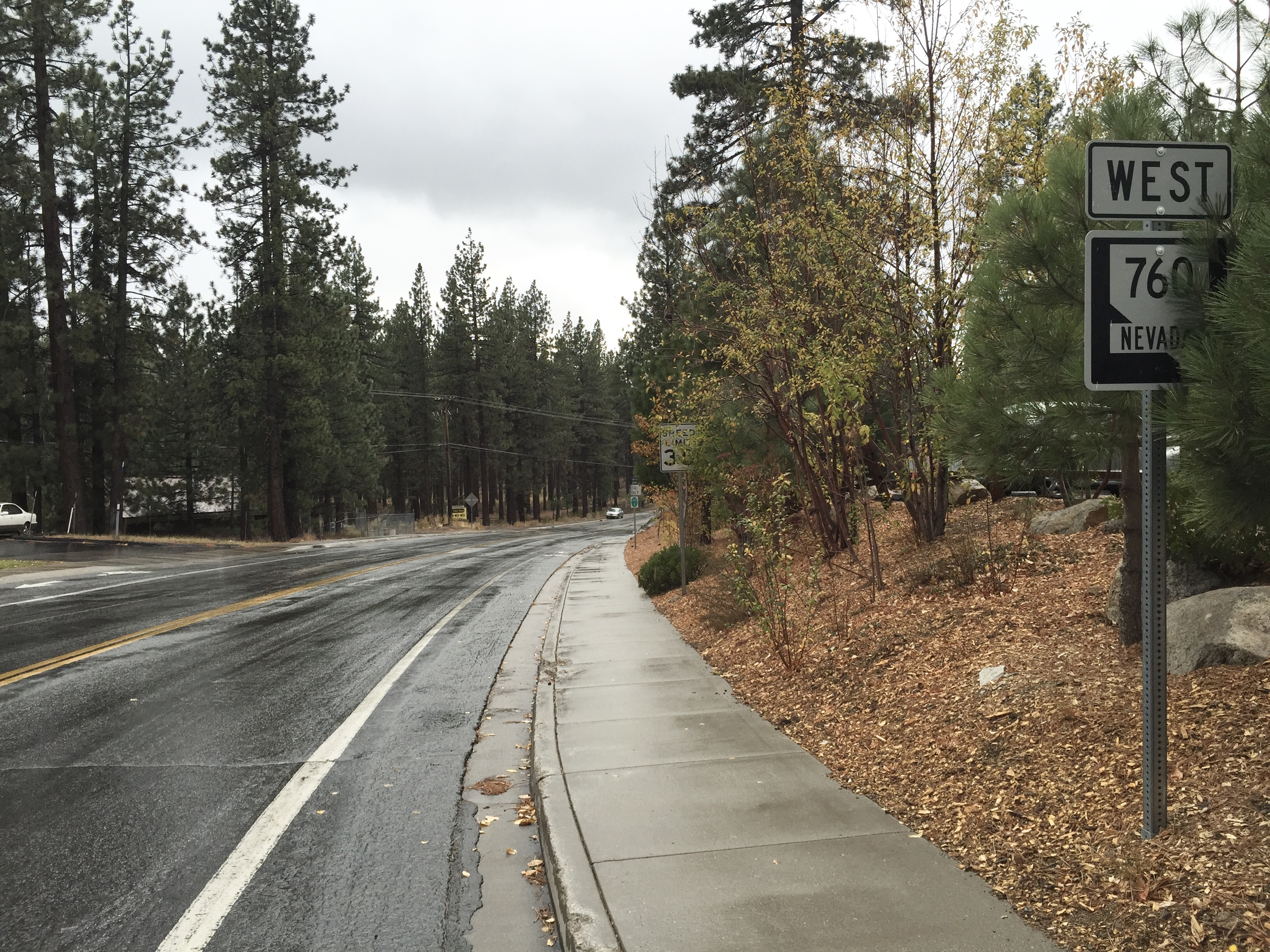
View at the east end of SR 760 looking westbound

The route begins just southeast of Elk Point on Lake Tahoe at the intersection of Elk Avenue and the entrance to Nevada Beach, a National Forest Service beach and campground. From there, the route heads easterly along Elks Point Road 0.475 miles (0.764 km) to its terminus at US 50 in Round Hill Village just south of Zephyr Cove.

SR 760 was originally designated along Elks Point Road on July 1, 1976. In 2001, Nevada Department of Transportation listed SR 760 as "Nevada Beach Road" with a length of 0.603 miles (0.970 km); by October 2012, the current name and length were listed (no route changes were made).

The entire route is in Douglas County.

Location	mi	km	Destinations	Notes
	0.000	0.000	Nevada Beach Campground entrance	Western terminus; Roadway continues northerly as Elks Avenue
Round Hill Village	0.475	0.764	US 50 – Carson City, South Lake Tahoe	Eastern terminus; Elks Point Road continues easterly beyond terminus
1.000 mi = 1.609 km; 1.000 km = 0.621 mi

== State Route 781 ==
Palisade Bridge
- Location: Humboldt River in Eureka County
- Length: 0.039 mi (63 m)
- Existed: c. 1976–present

State Route 781 (SR 781) is a very short unsigned state highway in Palisade, Nevada, that consists solely of a 0.039-mile-long (63 m; 210 ft) bridge (named the Palisade Bridge) over the Humboldt River in Palisade Canyon. Although it is only about 1 mile (1.6 km) west of State Route 278 (SR 278), it does not connect with SR 278 or any other state highway.

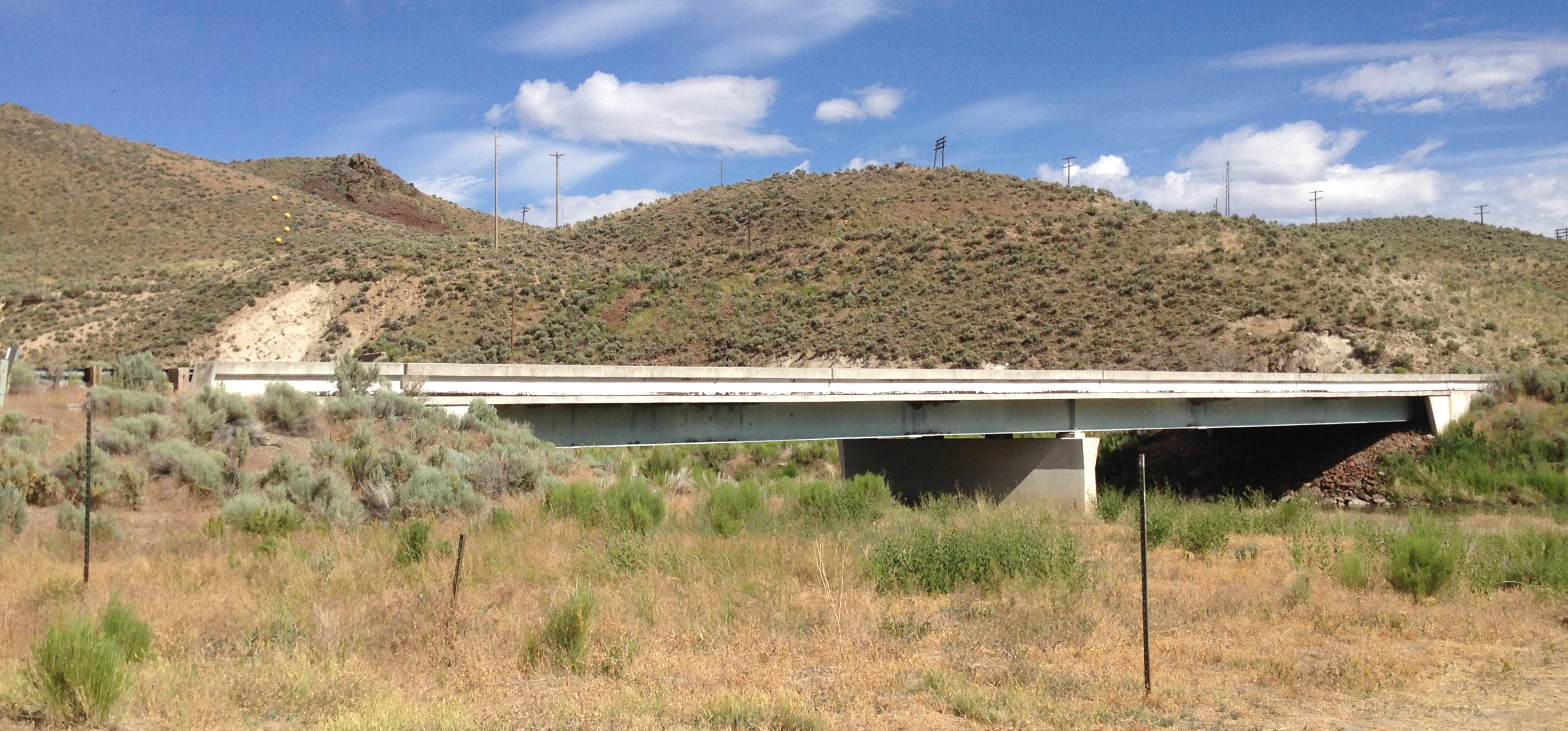
SR 781 consists solely of this bridge over the Humboldt River in Palisade, June 2014

The entire route is in Palisade, Eureka County.

mi	km	Destinations	Notes
0.000	0.000		South end of bridge
0.039	0.063		North end of bridge
1.000 mi = 1.609 km; 1.000 km = 0.621 mi

== State Route 787 ==
State Route 787
- Location: Winnemucca
- Length: 0.497 mi (800 m)

State Route 787 (SR 787) is a very short state highway along a section of Hanson Street in Winnemucca, Nevada, United States. SR 787 primarily serves as a connector road between Interstate 80 Business/U.S. Route 95 (I-80 Bus./US 95) and State Route 294 (SR 294) within the city.

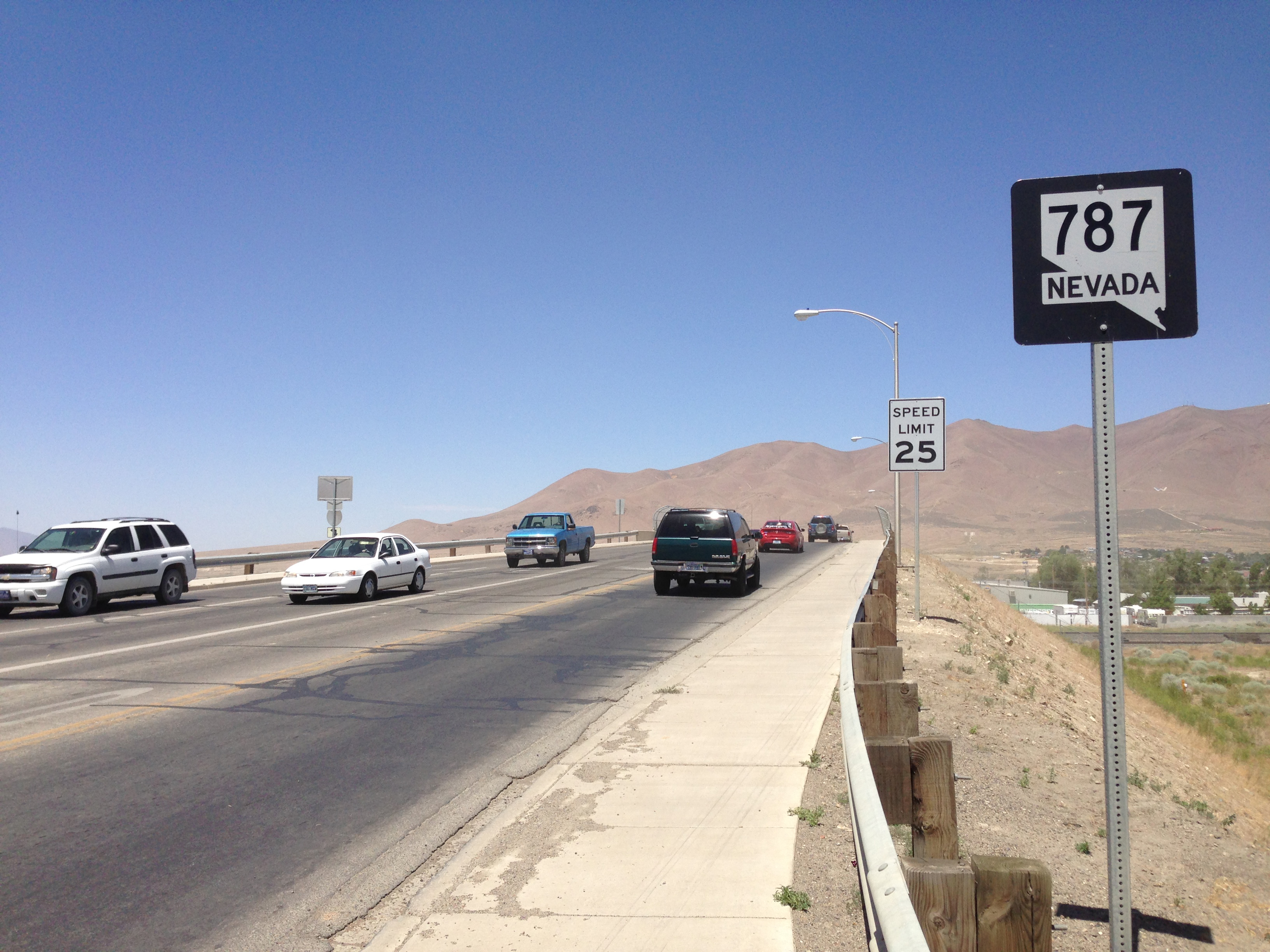
Looking northwest along Hanson Street from the eastern terminus of SR 787, with Winnemucca Mountain in the distance, June 2014

SR 787 begins at an intersection with West Winnemucca Drive (I-80 Bus./US 95). (Hanson Street continues northwest a block before ending at the southwestern end of West 2nd Street. West Winnemucca Boulevard [I-80 Bus./US 95] continues southwest to an interchange with Interstate 80 [I-80] and northwest to both a junction with State Route 289 and then another interchange with I-80.) From its western terminus, SR 787 heads southeast as a three lane road (with a center turn lane) through commercial area for the entire length of the route.

After crossing West 4th Street, SR 787 connects with the southwest end of West 5th Street and then crosses Nixon Street and West 6th Street. The route then traverses a viaduct (that passes over the Union Pacific Railroad tracks) before reaching its eastern terminus at an intersection with Grass Valley Road (SR 294)/West Haskell Street. From the southern terminus of SR 787, Hanson Street continues easterly before ending at an intersection with South Highland Drive and Water Canyon Road. West Haskell Street heads northeast, running parallel with the southwest side of the railroad tracks, to East Winnemucca Boulevard (I-80 Bus./SR 794), after which East Haskell Street becomes Fairgrounds Road. Grass Valley Road (SR 294) heads southwest [leaving Winnemucca] to point about 1.75 miles (2.82 km) east-northeast of the Winnemucca Municipal Airport. From that point Grass Valley Road heads southerly through the Grass Valley, passing the community of Grass Valley, and on to the southern part of Pleasant Valley. However, SR 294 terminates at the Pershing County line, at the intersection of Grass Valley Road with Power Line Road/Muddy Road, about 8 miles (13 km) south of Winnemucca.

The entire route is in Winnemucca, Humboldt County.

mi	km	Destinations	Notes
0.000	0.000	Hanson Street (northwest) – West 2nd Street	Continuation northwest beyond western terminus
0.000	0.000	US 95 (West Winnemucca Boulevard) / I-80 BL	Western terminus
		Viaduct over the Union Pacific Railroad tracks	
0.497	0.800	SR 294 south (Grass Valley Road) – Grass Valley; West Haskell Street (north) – SR 794 / I-80 Bus.	Eastern terminus SR 294 formerly continued north along West Haskell Street
0.497	0.800	Hanson Street (east) – South Highland Drive and Water Canyon Road	Continuation southeast beyond eastern terminus
1.000 mi = 1.609 km; 1.000 km = 0.621 mi

== State Route 816 ==
State Route 816
- Location: Panaca
- Length: 0.610 mi (982 m)
- Existed: c. 1976–present

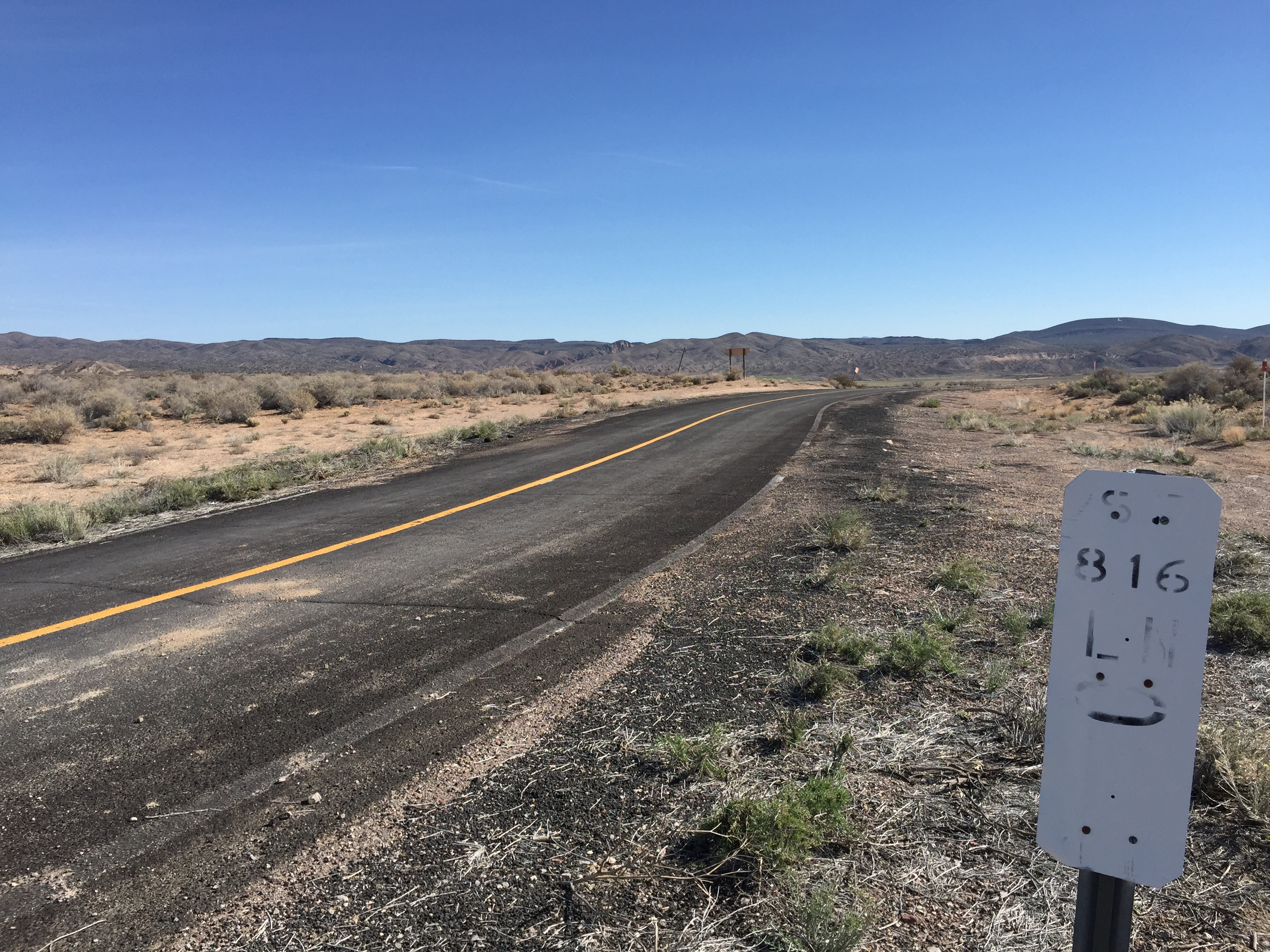
View at the west end of SR 816 looking eastbound, March 2016

State Route 816 (SR 816), Panaca Airport Road, is an unsigned 0.610-mile (0.982 km) state highway in Panaca, Nevada, United States, that connects the Lincoln County Airport with US 93.

The entire route is in Panaca, Lincoln County.

mi	km	Destinations	Notes
0.000	0.000	Lincoln County Airport	Western teriminus
0.610	0.982	US 93 north (Great Basin Highway) – Pioche, US 6, Ely US 93 south (Great Basin Highway) – Caliente, Alamo, Las Vegas	Eastern terminus; T intersection
1.000 mi = 1.609 km; 1.000 km = 0.621 mi

== State Route 822 ==
State Route 822
- Location: Dayton
- Length: 0.146 mi (235 m)
- Existed: 1976–present

State Route 822 (SR 822) is a short, east–west highway in Lyon County, Nevada. The route serves the town of Dayton.

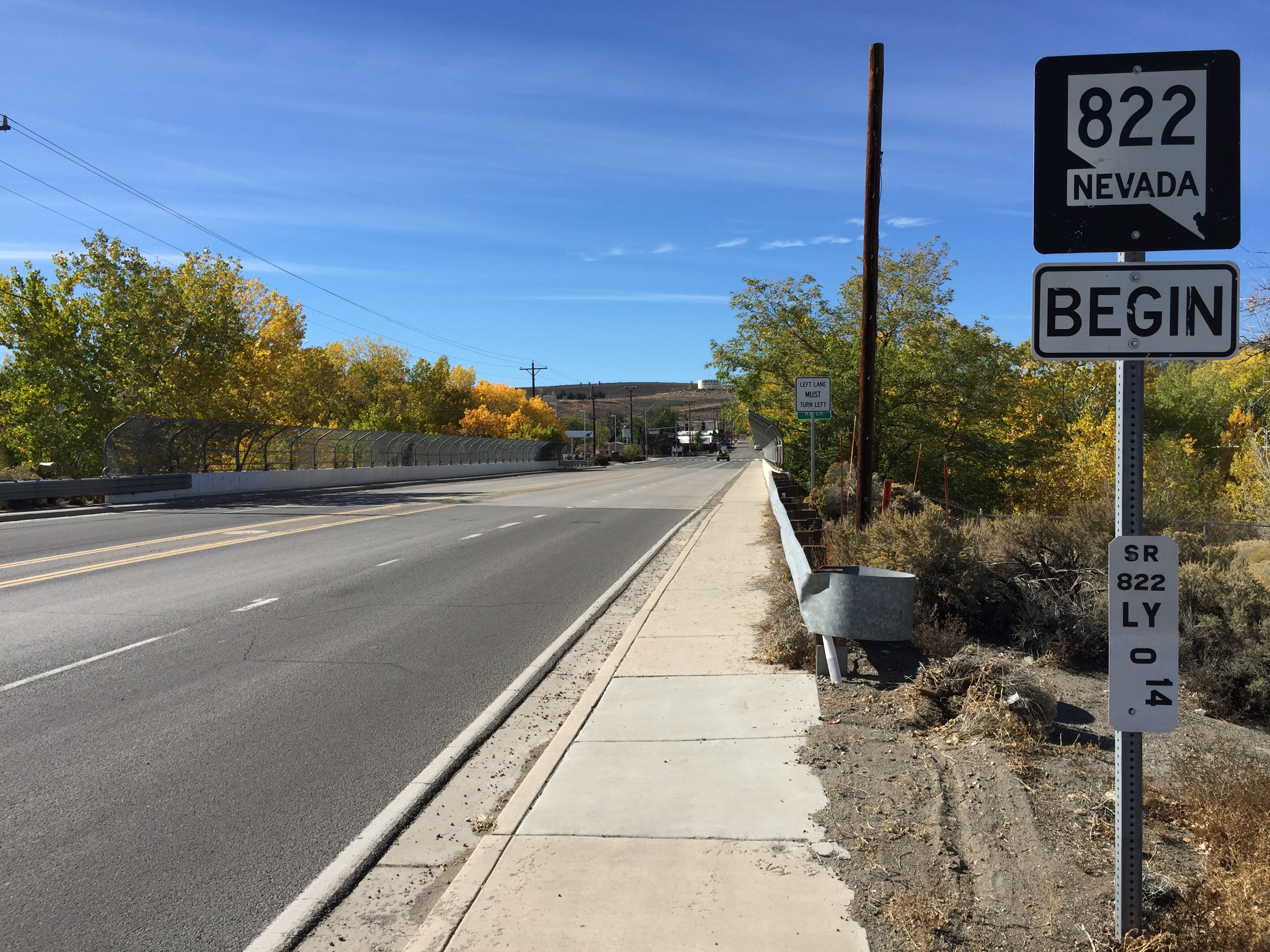
View at the east end of SR 822 looking westbound. The bridge over the Carson River is directly ahead, and the west end of the route at US 50 is also visible in the distance

The western end of State Route 822 begins at the intersection of U.S. Route 50, Main Street and Dayton Valley Road in Dayton. From there, the route travels eastward 0.146 miles (0.235 km) along Dayton Valley Road, crossing over the Carson River. SR 822 reaches its eastern terminus at the intersection of Dayton Valley Road and Ricci Road, although Dayton Valley Road continues eastward. Although it is a short route, an average of 10,000 vehicles per day traveled the highway in 2012.

SR 822 was created on July 1, 1976, in the 1976 renumbering of Nevada's state highways.

The entire route is in Dayton, Lyon County.

mi	km	Destinations	Notes
0.000	0.000	US 50 – Carson City, Fallon	Western terminus; Dayton Valley Road continues west as Main Street
0.146	0.235	Ricci Road	Eastern terminus; Dayton Valley Road continues east beyond terminus
1.000 mi = 1.609 km; 1.000 km = 0.621 mi

== State Route 825 ==
State Route 825
- Location: Lyon County
- Length: 0.415 mi (668 m)
- Existed: c. 1976–present

State Route 825 (SR 825) is a state highway in Lyon County, Nevada, United States. It runs along Gage Road from the beginning of pavement eastward to State Route 824 (Day Lane).

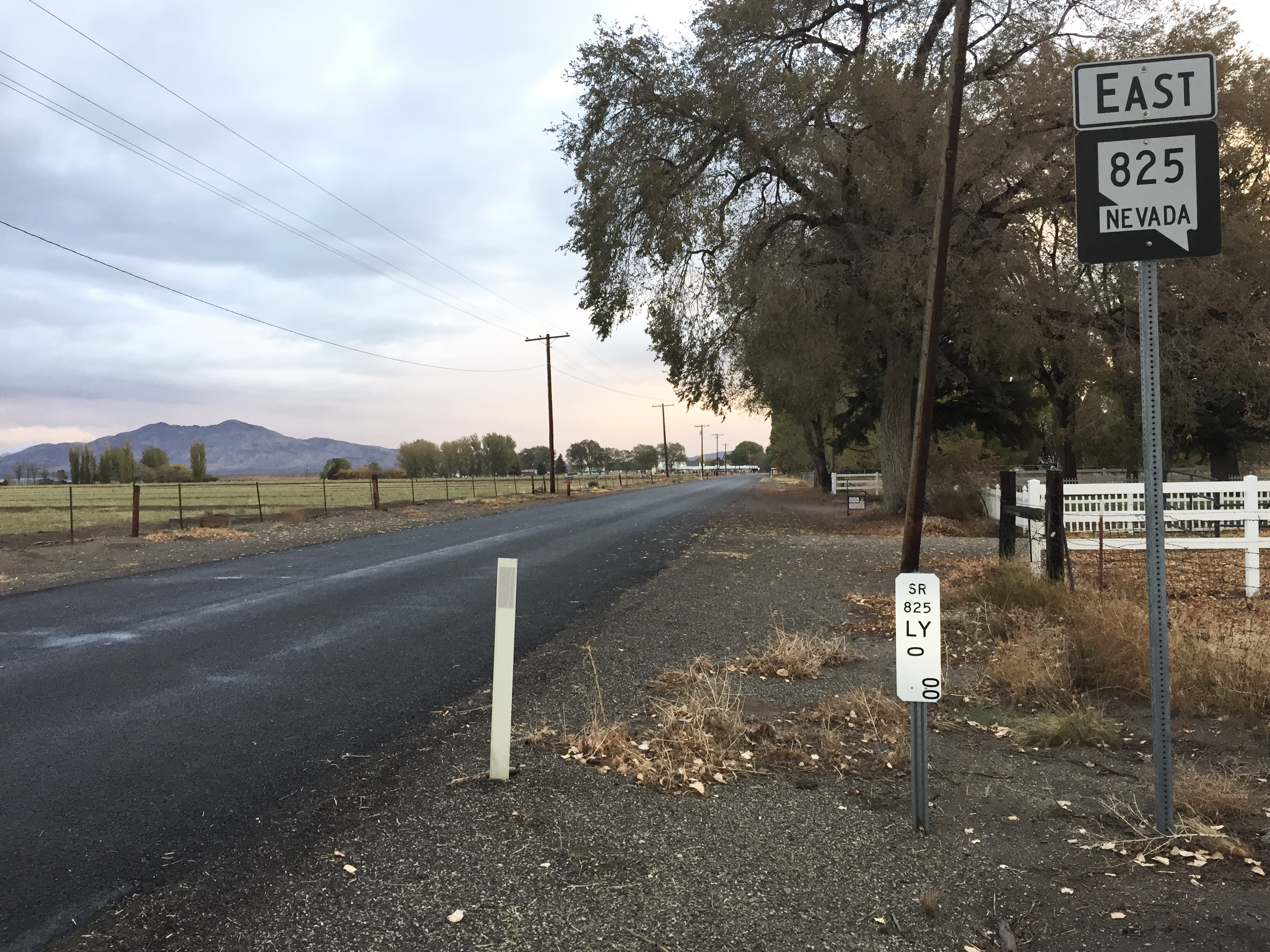
View at the west end of SR 825 looking eastbound

== State Route 858 ==
State Route 858
- Location: Pershing County
- Length: 0.546 mi (879 m)
- Existed: 1976–2013

State Route 858 (SR 858) was a short state highway in Pershing County, Nevada. SR 858 began on the west side of Interstate 80 and U.S. Route 95 at the Oreana Interchange (Exit 119). The route crossed under the freeway and ended at the I-80 frontage road on the east side of the interstate. The frontage road (Old US 40) provides access to the town site of Oreana southwest of the interchange.

SR 858 was the southwestern end of former State Route 50. Established by 1935, that route traveled from the Oreana area east and north to Mill City via Rochester. SR 50 was deleted in the 1976 renumbering of Nevada's state highways. In that process, most of the route was renumbered to today's State Route 400, the small southwest end became State Route 858, and the remaining unimproved section of the highway was removed from the state highway system.

The SR 858 designation was removed during the first three months of 2013 and the roadway was re-designated as a frontage road.

The entire route was in Pershing County.

Location	mi	km	Destinations	Notes
	0.00	0.00	I-80 / US 95 – Lovelock, Winnemucca	
	0.55	0.89	Frontage Road – Oreana	old US 40
1.000 mi = 1.609 km; 1.000 km = 0.621 mi

== State Route 859 ==
State Route 859
- Location: Imlay
- Length: 0.331 mi (533 m)
- Existed: 1976–c. 2001

State Route 859 (SR 859) is a former state highway in Pershing County, Nevada, that served the town of Imlay. The route was turned over to local control by 2002. SR 859 began at the Imlay interchange (exit 145) on Interstate 80. The route headed northward 0.331 miles (0.533 km), ending in the middle of Imlay.

SR 859 was created in the 1976 renumbering of Nevada's state highway system. The route was removed from the state highway system by January 2002.

== State Route 880 ==
State Route 880
- Location: Sparks
- Length: 0.621 mi (999 m)
- Existed: 1976–present

State Route 880 (SR 880) is a short state highway located in Sparks, Nevada.

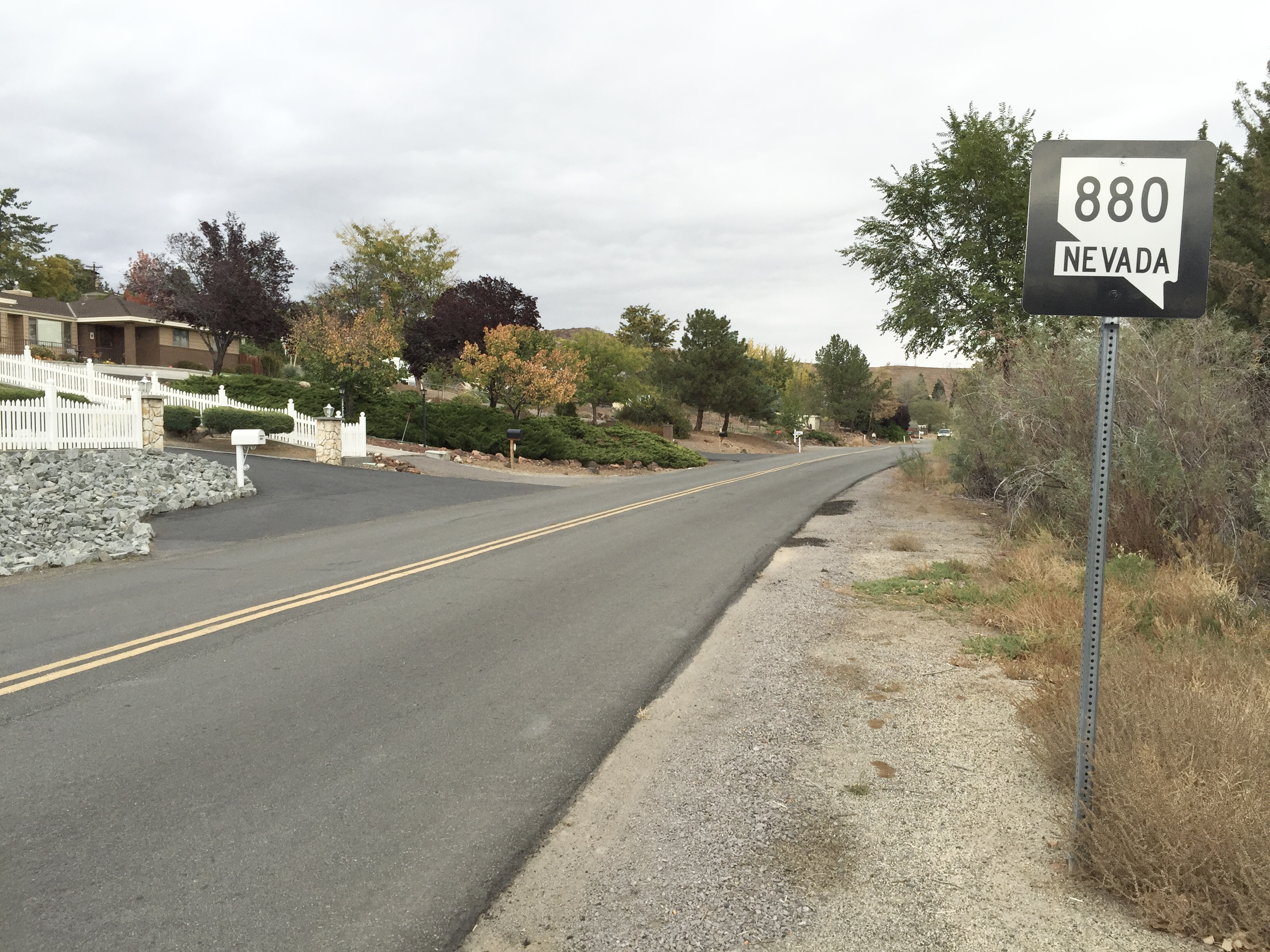
View east from the west end of SR 880

SR 880 starts at the beginning of state maintenance along Wedekind Road, just east of the Wildcreek Golf Course at the intersection of Malapai Way, near where the Orr Irrigation Ditch crosses the roadway. From there, the route follows Wedekind Road northeasterly through a residential area, paralleling the Orr Ditch. The route then turns southeast on Farr Lane to come to its eastern terminus at an intersection with Pyramid Way (SR 445).

The 1996 NDOT Log included a leg-of-wye from State Route 445 to State Route 880 (Wedekind Road). State Route 880 formerly existed as part of State Route 33, which extended further south along Wedekind Road and north along SR 445.

The entire route is in Sparks, Washoe County.

mi	km	Destinations	Notes
0.000	0.000	Malapai Way	Western terminus; Wedekind Road continues west
0.621	0.999	SR 445 (Pyramid Way)	Eastern terminus
1.000 mi = 1.609 km; 1.000 km = 0.621 mi
