= Nevada State Route 294 =

State highway in Nevada, United States

State Route 294
- Grass Valley Road
- SR 294 highlighted in red

Route information
- Maintained by NDOT
- Length: 7.973 mi (12.831 km)
- Existed: 1981–present

Major junctions
- South end: Pershing County line south of Winnemucca
- North end: SR 787 in Winnemucca

Location
- Country: United States
- State: Nevada
- Counties: Humboldt

Highway system
- Nevada State Highway System; Interstate; US; State; Pre‑1976; Scenic
← SR 293	→ SR 304

State Route 294 (SR 294) is a 7.973-mile (12.831 km) state highway in southeastern Humboldt County, Nevada, United States, that runs along the northernmost part of Grass Valley Road and connects Winnemucca with the Grass Valley area south of the town.

== Route description ==
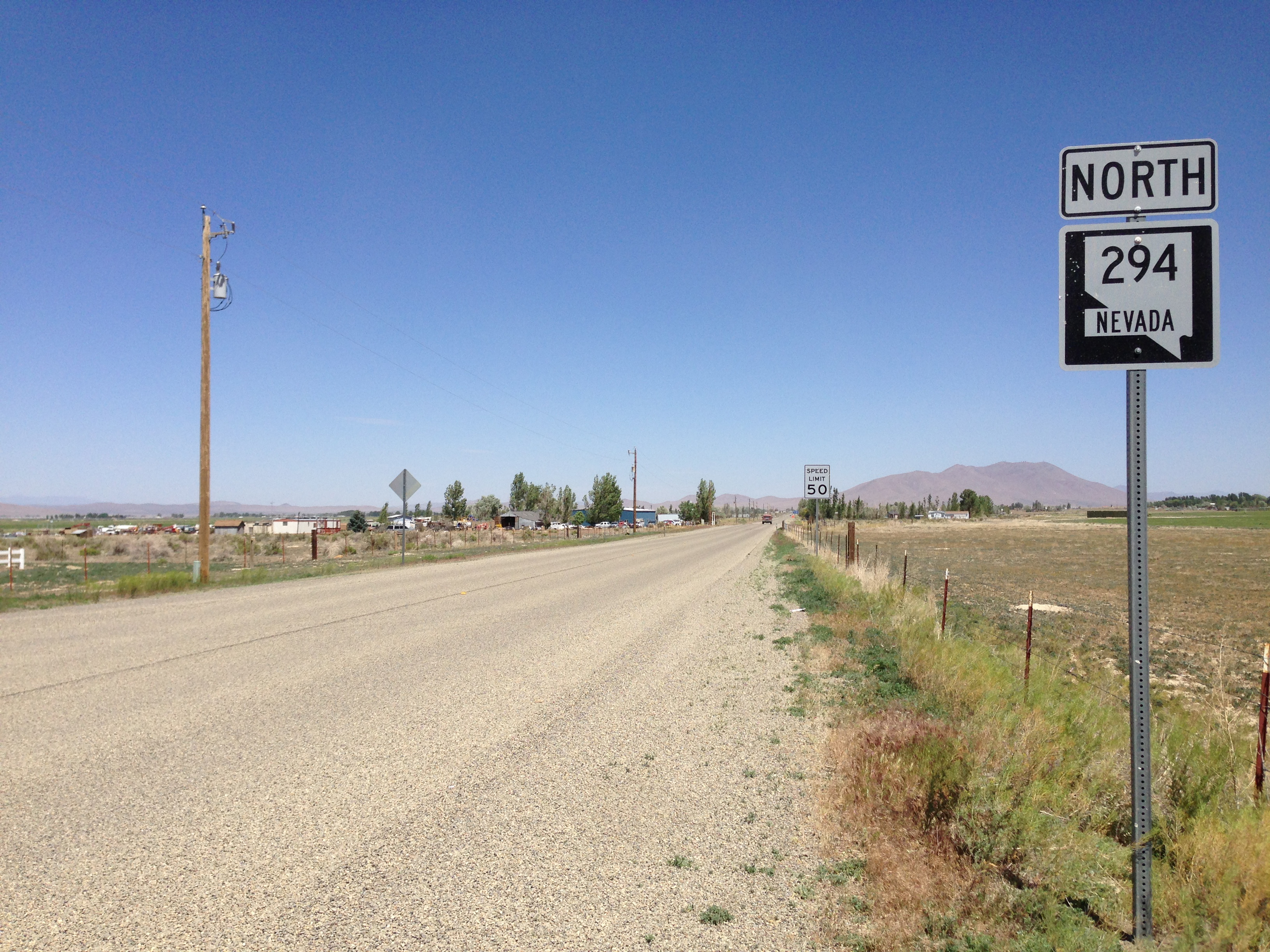
Looking north from the southern terminus of SR 294 (near the Pershing County line), with Winnemucca Mountain in the distance, June 2014

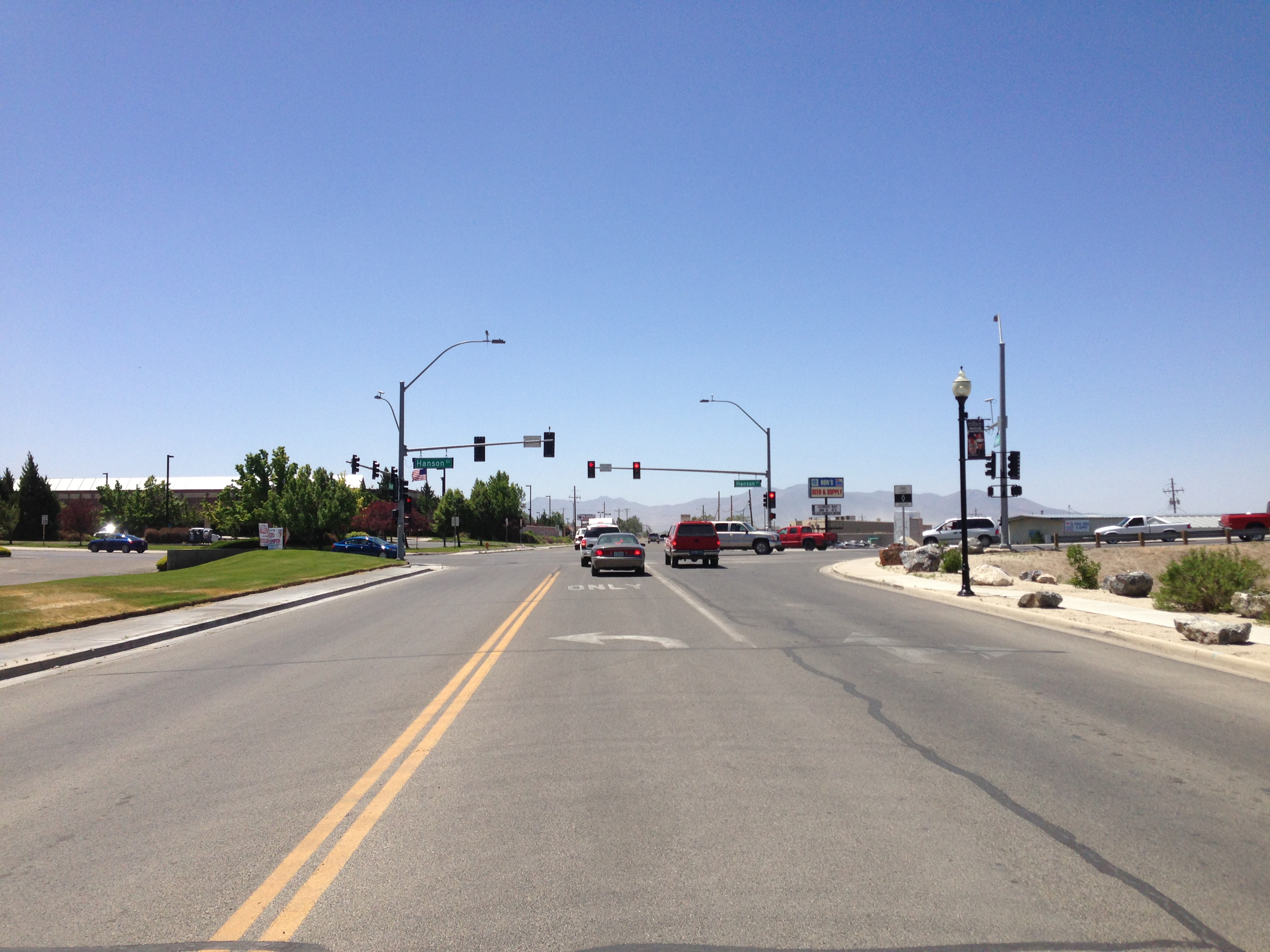
Looking southwest along Haskell Street at the northern terminus of SR 294 (Grass Valley Road) and the eastern terminus of SR 787 (Hanson Street) in Winnemucca, June 2014

SR 294 begins on Grass Valley Road at the Pershing County line (identified by being a cattle guard crossing) in the northern part of the Grass Valley. Grass Valley Road continues south past the community of Grass Valley, through the Grass Valley, and on to the southern part of Pleasant Valley.) From its southern terminus, SR 294 heads north through the northern part of the Grass Valley, passing through agricultural and rural residences of the greater Winnemucca area. After about 4 miles (6.4 km) it comes to point about 1.75 miles (2.82 km) east-northeast of the Winnemucca Municipal Airport. There it has an intersection with Westmoreland Road (which heads due west to the airport). Near this intersection SR 294 turns easterly to run northeast and parallel to the Union Pacific Railroad tracks.

Development gradually increases near the highway as it parallels the railroad as they head northeast into the Winnemucca city limits. At an intersection with Hanson Street (the eastern terminus of Nevada State Route 787 [SR 787]), the route reaches its current northern terminus. (Hanson Street [SR 787] heads northwest to connect with U.S. Route 95/Interstate 80 Business [I‑80 Bus.] at the western terminus of SR 787. Hanson Street also continues easterly as city street through the southern part of the town to end at an intersection with South Highland Drive and Water Canyon Road.) Beyond the northern terminus, West Haskell Street continues northeast (along what was formerly also part of SR 294) to end at intersection with East Winnemucca Boulevard (State Route 794/I‑80 Bus.).

== History ==
SR 294 became a state highway on March 26, 1981. The route originally continued north past its current northern terminus (and the eastern terminus of SR 787 [Hanson Street]) along West Haskell Road to end at East Winnemucca Boulevard (SR 794/I‑80 Bus.). This portion of the route was turned over to local control by 2017.

== Major intersections ==
The entire route is in Humboldt County.

Location	mi	km	Destinations	Notes
	0.000	0.000	Grass Valley Road – Grass Valley	Continuation south beyond southern terminus
	0.000	0.000	Power Line Road (west) – Herschell Road; Muddy Road (east)	Southern terminus at the Pershing County line
			Westmoreland Road west – SR 796, Winnemucca Municipal Airport	
Winnemucca	7.973	12.831	SR 787 west / Hanson Street – US 95 / I-80 Bus.	Northern terminus
Winnemucca	7.973	12.831	West Haskell Street – SR 794 / I-80 Bus.	Continuation northwest beyond northern terminus; former routing of SR 294 north
1.000 mi = 1.609 km; 1.000 km = 0.621 mi

== See also ==
- List of state routes in Nevada
- List of highways numbered 294
