= Nevada State Route 796 =

Highway in Nevada

State Route 796
- Airport Road
- SR 796 highlighted in red

Route information
- Maintained by NDOT
- Length: 1.364 mi (2.195 km)
- Existed: 1976–present

Major junctions
- South end: Winnemucca Municipal Airport
- North end: I-80 frontage road west of Winnemucca

Location
- Country: United States
- State: Nevada

Highway system
- Nevada State Highway System; Interstate; US; State; Pre‑1976; Scenic
← SR 795	→ SR 806

State Route 796 (SR 796) is a state highway in Humboldt County, Nevada serving the Winnemucca area.

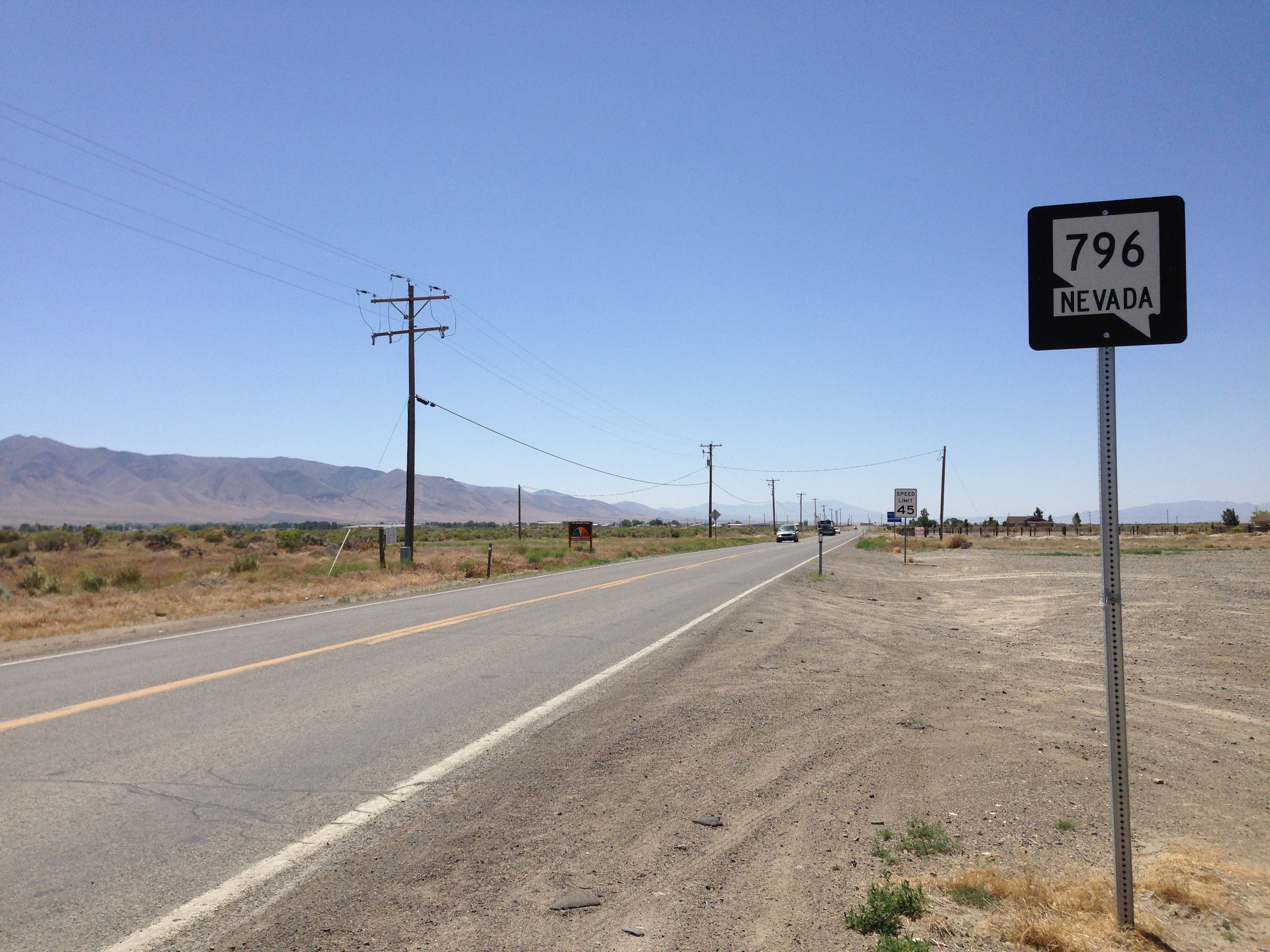
View at the north end of SR 796 looking southbound

== Route description ==
State Route 796 begins at the main entrance to the Winnemucca Municipal Airport southwest of downtown Winnemucca in Grass Valley. From there, the highway travels northwest, crossing over Union Pacific Railroad tracks and ending at an Interstate 80 frontage road.

== History ==
SR 796 became a state highway on May 1, 1997.

== Major intersections ==
The entire route is in Humboldt County.

Location	mi	km	Destinations	Notes
	0.00	0.00	Winnemucca Municipal Airport	
	1.33	2.14	Frontage Road – Winnemucca	
1.000 mi = 1.609 km; 1.000 km = 0.621 mi
