= Lincoln County Airport =

Airport in Nevada

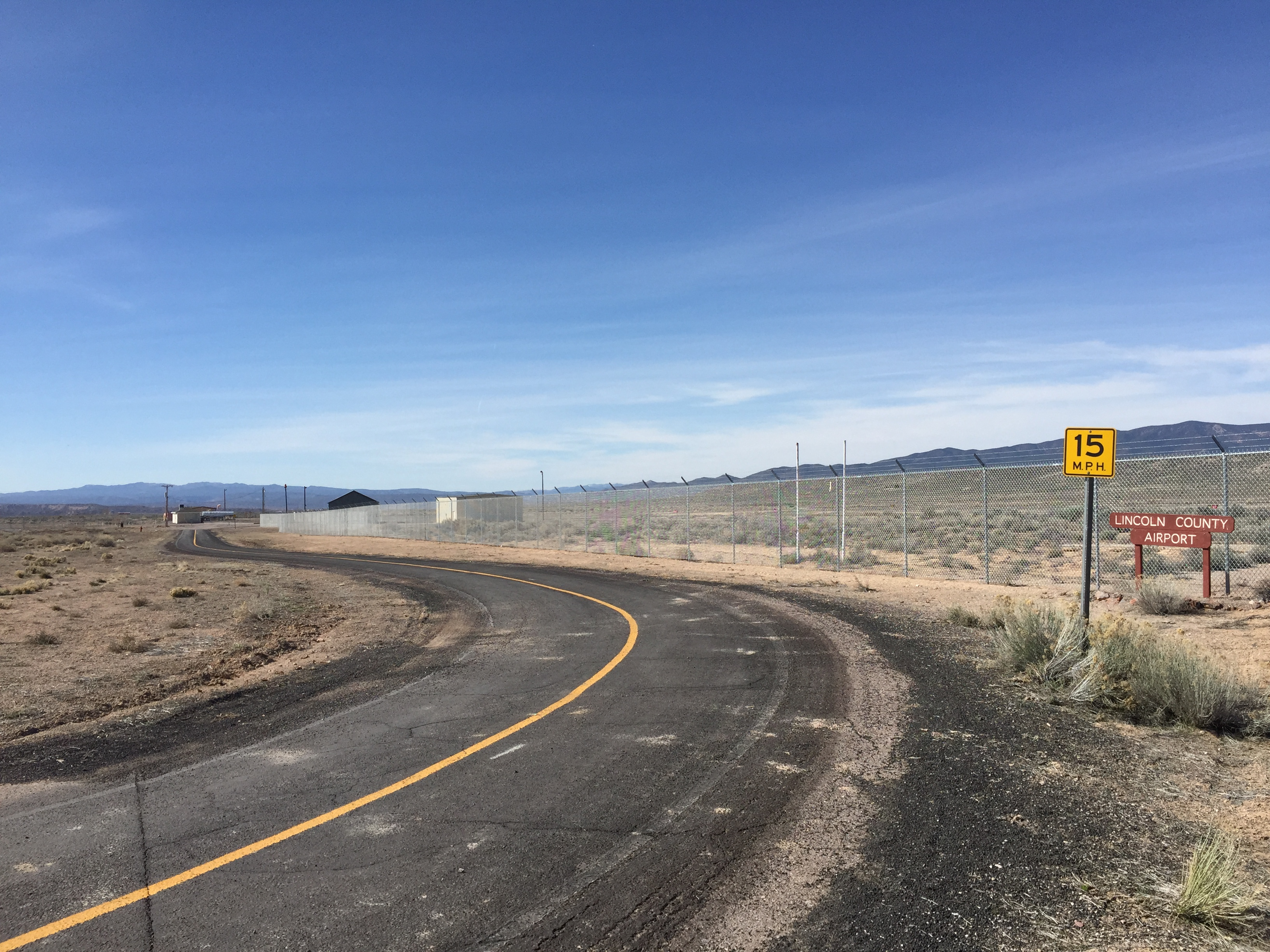
- IATA: none; ICAO: none; FAA LID: 1L1

Summary
- Airport type: Public
- Owner: Lincoln County
- Serves: Panaca, Nevada
- Location: Lincoln County, Nevada
- Elevation AMSL: 4,831 ft / 1,472 m
- Coordinates: 37°47′15″N 114°25′12″W

Map
- Location of airport in Nevada 1L1 (the United States)

Runways
Direction	Length		Surface
Direction	ft	m	Surface
17/35	4,606	1,404	Asphalt

Statistics (2023)
- Aircraft operations (year ending 5/16/2023): 3,600
- Based aircraft: 0
- Source: Federal Aviation Administration

Lincoln County Airport (FAA LID: 1L1) is a county-owned, public-use airport in Lincoln County, Nevada, United States. It is located two nautical miles (4 km) west of the central business district of Panaca, Nevada. It is within the Desert MOA associated with Nellis Air Force Base: the MOA begins 1500 feet above the airfield.

The National Plan of Integrated Airport Systems for 2011–2015 categorized it as a general aviation facility.

== Facilities and aircraft ==
Lincoln County Airport covers an area of 190 acres (77 ha) at an elevation of 4,831 feet (1,472 m) above mean sea level. It has one runway designated 17/35 with an asphalt surface measuring 4,606 by 60 feet (1,404 x 18 m).

For the 12-month period ending May 16, 2023, the airport had 3,600 aircraft operations, an average of 69 per week, 97% general aviation, and 3% military.

Road access to the airport is provided by Nevada State Route 816, which connects the airport to U.S. Route 93.

== See also ==
- List of airports in Nevada
