= Panaca, Nevada =

Unincorporated town in the State of Nevada, United States

- Unincorporated town
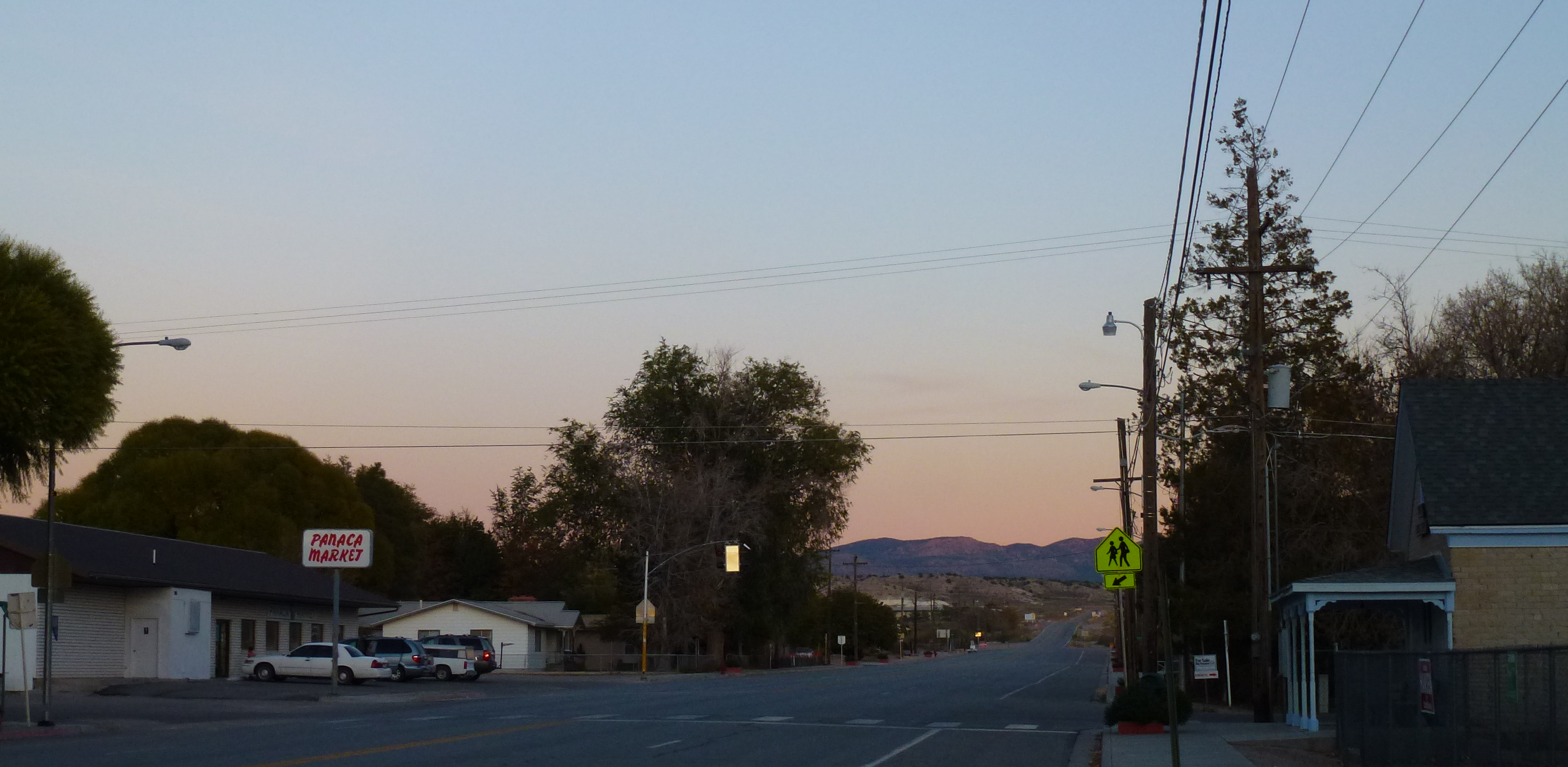
- Main Street in Panaca, 2012

- Location within the state of Nevada Panaca (the United States)
- Coordinates: 37°47′28″N 114°23′20″W
- Country: United States
- State: Nevada
- County: Lincoln

Area
  - Total: 3.08 sq mi (7.98 km^{2})
  - Land: 3.08 sq mi (7.98 km^{2})
  - Water: 0 sq mi (0.00 km^{2})

Population (2020)
  - Total: 870
  - Density: 282.5/sq mi (109.07/km^{2})
- Time zone: UTC−8 (Pacific (PST))
  - Summer (DST): UTC−7 (PDT)
- ZIP code: 89042
- Area code: 775
- FIPS code: 32-54200
- GNIS feature ID: 2583949
- Website: www.lincolncountynv.org

Nevada Historical Marker
- Reference no.: 39

Panaca is an unincorporated town in eastern Lincoln County, Nevada, United States, on State Route 319, about 1 mile (1.6 kilometers) east of U.S. Route 93, near the border with Utah. Its elevation is 4,729 feet (1,441 meters) above sea level. As of the 2010 census, it had a population of 963. It is one of only two cities in Nevada that prohibit gambling, the other being Boulder City.

== History ==
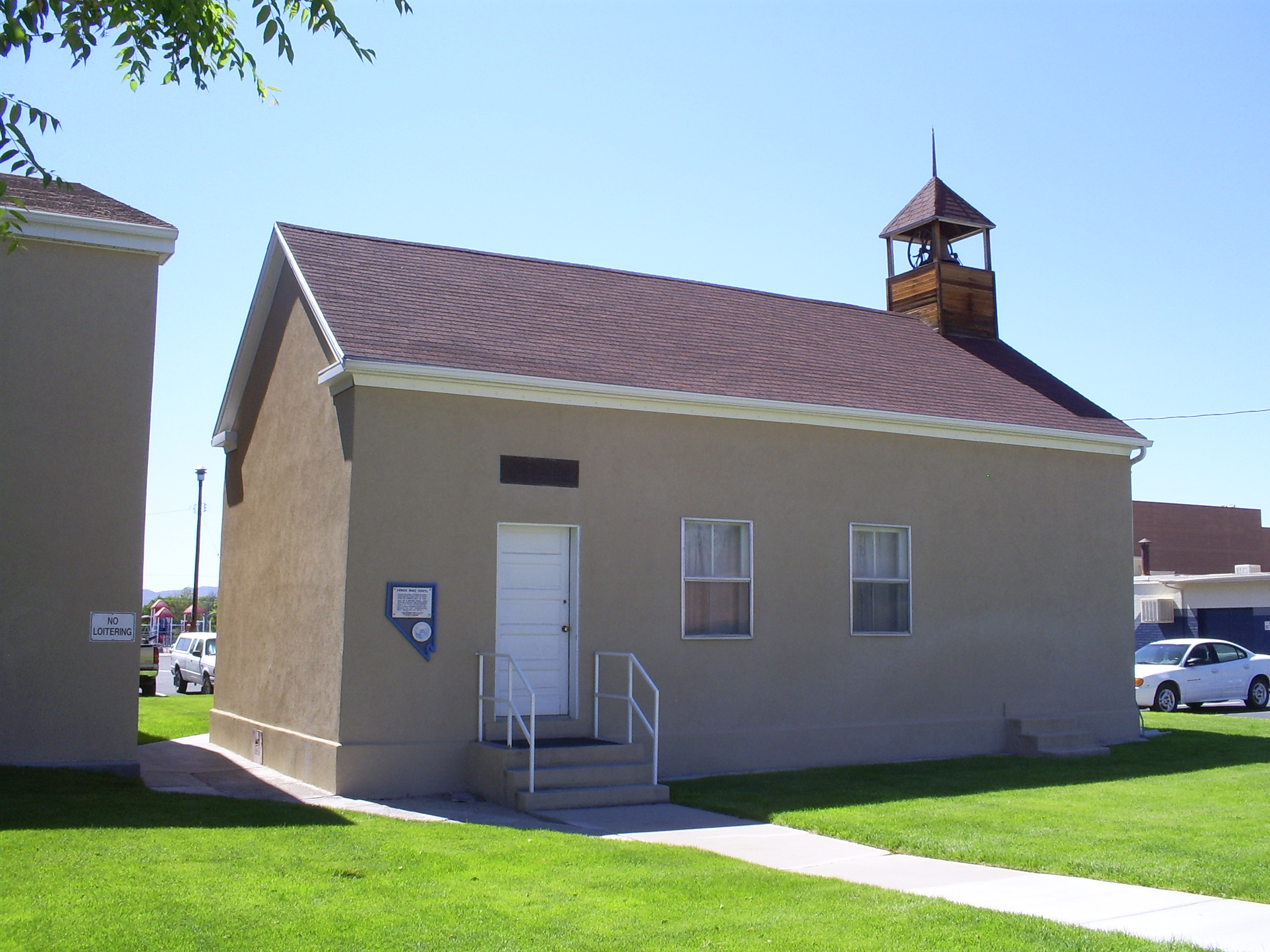
The Panaca Ward Chapel (1867–1868) is the oldest building in Lincoln County.

The area that was to become the Panaca settlement was explored by Mormons in 1857. Brigham Young dispatched the explorers in order to locate a potential refuge in case of a U.S. military campaign against Utah. The location was selected due to the Meadow Valley oasis at the headwaters of the Muddy River. Mormon scouts began irrigation ditches and started fields, but the site was soon deserted after the feared violence never materialized. Panaca was the first permanent settlement by European Americans in southern Nevada. It was founded as a Mormon colony in 1864. It began as part of Washington County, Utah, but the congressional redrawing of boundaries in 1866 shifted Panaca into Nevada. It is the only community in Nevada to be "dry" (forbidding the sale of alcoholic beverages), and the only community in Nevada, besides Boulder City, that prohibits gambling.

Coke ovens here once produced charcoal for the smelters in nearby Bullionville (now a ghost town), but the town's economy is predominantly agricultural.

The name "Panaca" comes from the Southern Paiute word Pan-nuk-ker, which means "metal, money, wealth". William Hamblin, a Mormon missionary to the Paiutes, established the Panacker Ledge (Panaca Claim) silver mine there in 1864.

== Geography ==
According to the U.S. Census Bureau, the Panaca census-designated place has an area of 3.3 square miles (8.5 km^{2}), all of it land. Along Nevada State Route 319, it is 19 miles (31 km) east to the Utah state line and from there another 60 miles (97 km) east to Cedar City, Utah. West from Panaca it is 1.0 mile (1.6 km) to U.S. Route 93, at which point it is 11 miles (18 km) north to Pioche and 14 miles (23 km) south to Caliente.

== Transportation ==
The Panaca area is served by the following highways:

- U.S. Route 93 (Great Basin Highway)
- Nevada State Route 319 (Main Street)
- Nevada State Route 816 (Panaca Airport Road)

The Lincoln County Airport is a public-use airport operated by Lincoln County. It is located to the west of Panaca's central business district and is accessed via State Route 816.

== Demographics ==
Historical population
Census	Pop.	Note	%±
2010	963		—
2020	870		−9.7%
U.S. Decennial Census

In the 2023 American Community Survey census, Panaca's population was 1,272 across its 3.1 sq mi (8.0 km^{2}) area. The median age was 31.2 years old with 61% of the population being female. The median household income was $61,935, with the average per capita income being $31,106. Approximately 5.7% of the population lived below the poverty line, including 6% of all children. This is about half the rate of Nevada's numbers, which stands at 12.6%.

There were 392 households in Panaca, with 3.2 persons per household on average. Among people aged 15 and older, 65% were married. There were 444 housing units as of 2023, with 88% being occupied, and 66% of those being owner-occupied. The median value of the units were $277,280, about 1.3x the value of the rest of Lincoln County's units. 100% of the population had graduated high school, mostly at Lincoln County High School, while only 31.3% held a Bachelor's degree or higher. Within the population, there were 12 veterans, all male and all serving in the Vietnam War.

== Attractions ==
Panaca is located near Cathedral Gorge State Park.

The following Nevada historical markers have been placed in Panaca:

- Panaca (#39)
- Panaca Mercantile Store (#93)
- Panaca Spring (#160)
- Panaca Ward Chapel (#182)

Panaca celebrates Pioneer Day on the Saturday closest to July 24. Events include cannon firing at 6 A.M., games and races, a parade, art displays, and a community dinner. This coincides with the Utah holiday commemorating the arrival of the Mormon pioneers in the Salt Lake Valley.

=== Panaca Summit Kilns ===
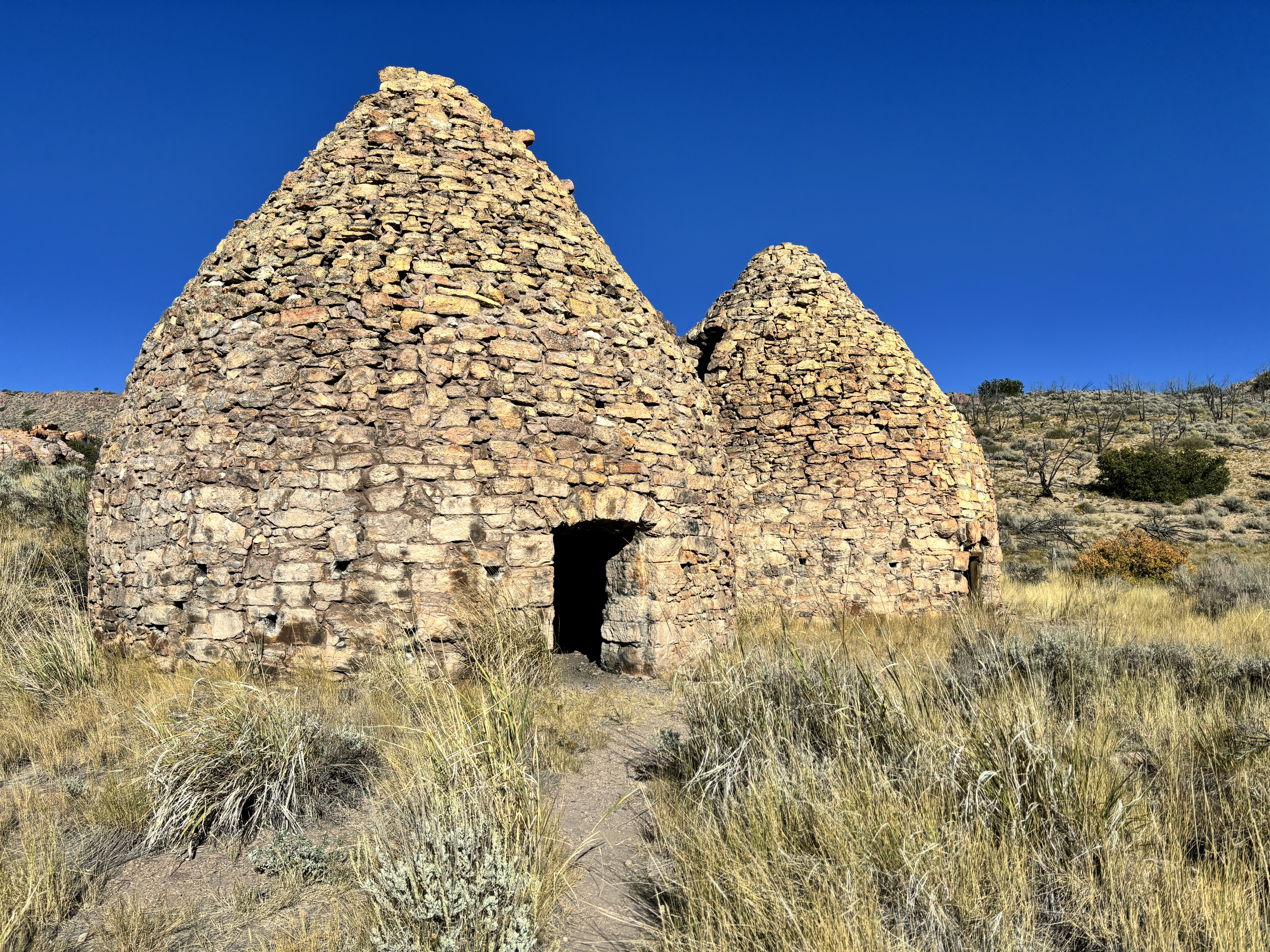
Abandoned charcoal kilns near Panaca

Abandoned charcoal kilns made of rhyolitic tuff are located outside of Panaca on SR-319, which served the nearby silver mines in Pioche and Bullionville. They were built in the mid-1870s to produce charcoal, and were operated by Italian and Swiss woodcutters to burn pinyon pine and juniper trees. The structures were built to resemble beehives using local limestone and mortar, allowing for control of the oxygen levels during the smothering process without catching the wood on fire, risking it turning to ash. The kilns were shut down in the 1890s when the last smelteries in Bullionville were closed. While many kilns from this era have eroded or been vandalized across Nevada, the Panaca Summit Kilns are managed by the Bureau of Land Management and stand as a tourist destination. Similar structures can be found in Ward Charcoal Ovens State Historic Park in Ely.

== See also ==
- List of census-designated places in Nevada
