= Grass Valley (Eureka and Lander counties, Nevada) =

Valley in Nevada, United States

Coordinates: 39°51′42″N 116°45′52″W

Grass Valley is a valley in the U.S. state of Nevada.

Grass Valley was so named for the grass which covers its floor.
