= Grass Valley (Pershing and Humboldt counties, Nevada) =

Valley in Pershing and Humboldt counties in Nevada, United States

- Location within Nevada
- Length: 30 mi (48 km) WNW x SSE

Geography
- Country: United States
- State: Nevada
- Region: Great Basin
- Counties: Pershing; Humboldt
- Communities: Winnemucca; Rose Creek; Goldbanks (site)
- Borders on: East Range; Winnemucca, Nevada; Sonoma Range; Tobin Range
- Coordinates: 40°43′51″N 117°40′29″W
- River: Clear Creek (Sonoma Range)
- Interactive map of Grass Valley

The Grass Valley of Pershing and Humboldt counties in northern Nevada, United States, is a 30-mile (48 km) long valley. The north section of the valley is part of the southwest portion of Winnemucca on the Humboldt River. Clear Creek flows down the valley center, north-northwesterly and joins the Humboldt at Rose Creek, Nevada, 10 miles (16 km) southwest of Winnemucca. The census-designated place of Grass Valley, with a population of 1,161, occupies the central 8 miles (13 km) of the valley.

The valley was named for the grass used for grazing.

== Description ==
Grass Valley trends north-northwest and is nestled between two mountain ranges on the Humboldt River's south. The East Range is southwest, the Sonoma Range is north-northeast. The valley narrows at its south-southeast with the north terminus hills of the Tobin Range meeting the Sonoma Range.

The valley is widest at its center, about 9 miles (14 km). Clear Creek enters from the northeast just north of center, and it drains from the central massif of the Sonoma Range, Sonoma Peak, at 9,395 feet (2,864 m).

The valley narrows north and south to about 4 miles (6.4 km), but widens at the floodplain of the Humboldt River. The center of the valley is approximately just southwest of Clear Creek Ranch at the west foothills of the Sonoma Range.

== Access ==
The north of Grass Valley is traversed by Nevada State Route 294; for 5 miles (8.0 km) into the valley it is paved. It becomes the unimproved road, Grass Valley Road, and goes through the valley center-east near the mountain foothills; 25 miles (40 km) further it reaches Goldbanks (site) at the south terminus of Grass Valley, the northwest region of the Tobin Range. Grass Valley Road continues south through Pleasant Valley, and then enters the north of Dixie Valley, (and Churchill County).

== See also ==
- List of valleys of Nevada

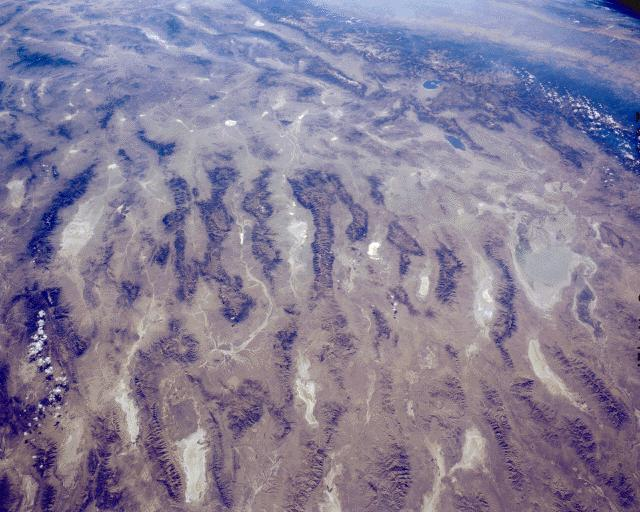
Satellite photo, view south; Carson sink at right (small, black curved range on its northwest is the W. Humboldt Range)-(Pahrump Valley, top-left; Death Valley-top; Sierra Nevada, top-right) The Buena Vista Lake Bed is shown north of Carson Sink, at west of the Humboldt Range; (Grass Valley (Pershing and Humboldt counties) is just northeast, past the East Range. (photo bottom edge))
