= Grass Valley Wilderness =

Protected area in California

- IUCN category Ib (wilderness area)
- Location within California Location within the United States
- Location: San Bernardino County, California
- Nearest city: Ridgecrest, California
- Coordinates: 35.3°N 117.3°W
- Area: 30,186 acres (12,216 ha)
- Established: October 31, 1994
- Governing body: U.S. Bureau of Land Management

Grass Valley Wilderness is a wilderness area in San Bernardino County, California, near Ridgecrest. It mainly consists of low-lying hills and flat desert covered by vegetation typical of the Mohave Desert, like creosote bush, desert scrub, and isolated stands of Joshua trees. Fauna consists of the desert tortoise and the Mohave ground squirrel. Naval Air Weapons Station China Lake borders the area to the east and a non-wilderness road bisects the area.

The area is managed by the Bureau of Land Management Ridgecrest Field Office and was established as a part of the California Desert Protection Act of 1994.
