= Grass Valley, Nevada =

- Census-designated place
- Location within Nevada
- Coordinates: 40°49′42″N 117°45′22″W
- Country: United States
- State: Nevada

Area
  - Total: 34.51 sq mi (89.38 km^{2})
  - Land: 34.51 sq mi (89.38 km^{2})
  - Water: 0 sq mi (0.00 km^{2})
- Elevation: 4,390 ft (1,338 m)

Population (2020)
  - Total: 991
  - Density: 28.7/sq mi (11.09/km^{2})
- Time zone: UTC-8 (Pacific (PST))
  - Summer (DST): UTC-7 (PDT)
- Area code: 775
- FIPS code: 32-30220

Grass Valley is a census-designated place (CDP) in northeastern Pershing County, Nevada, United States. As of the 2020 census, Grass Valley had a population of 991.

== Geography ==
Grass Valley is located 10 miles (16 km) south of Winnemucca. The CDP is named after the valley in which it lies, a 5-mile-wide (8 km) basin between the Sonoma Range to the east and the East Range to the west. Nevada State Route 294 (Grass Valley Road) runs from Grass Valley into Winnemucca.

According to the U.S. Census Bureau, the Grass Valley CDP has an area of 34.5 square miles (89.4 km^{2}), all land.

== Demographics ==
Historical population
Census	Pop.	Note	%±
2020	991		—
U.S. Decennial Census

== See also ==
- List of census-designated places in Nevada
