= East Range =

Mountain range in Nevada, United States

- Location within Nevada

Highest point
- Elevation: 1,906 m (6,253 ft)

Geography
- Country: United States
- State: Nevada
- District: Pershing County
- Range coordinates: 40°38′28.664″N 117°50′56.471″W
- Topo map: USGS Natchez Pass

The East Range is a mountain range in the Great Basin region, located in Pershing County, Nevada. The name is locational.
