= Winnemucca Municipal Airport =

Winnemucca Municipal Airport (Franklin Field)
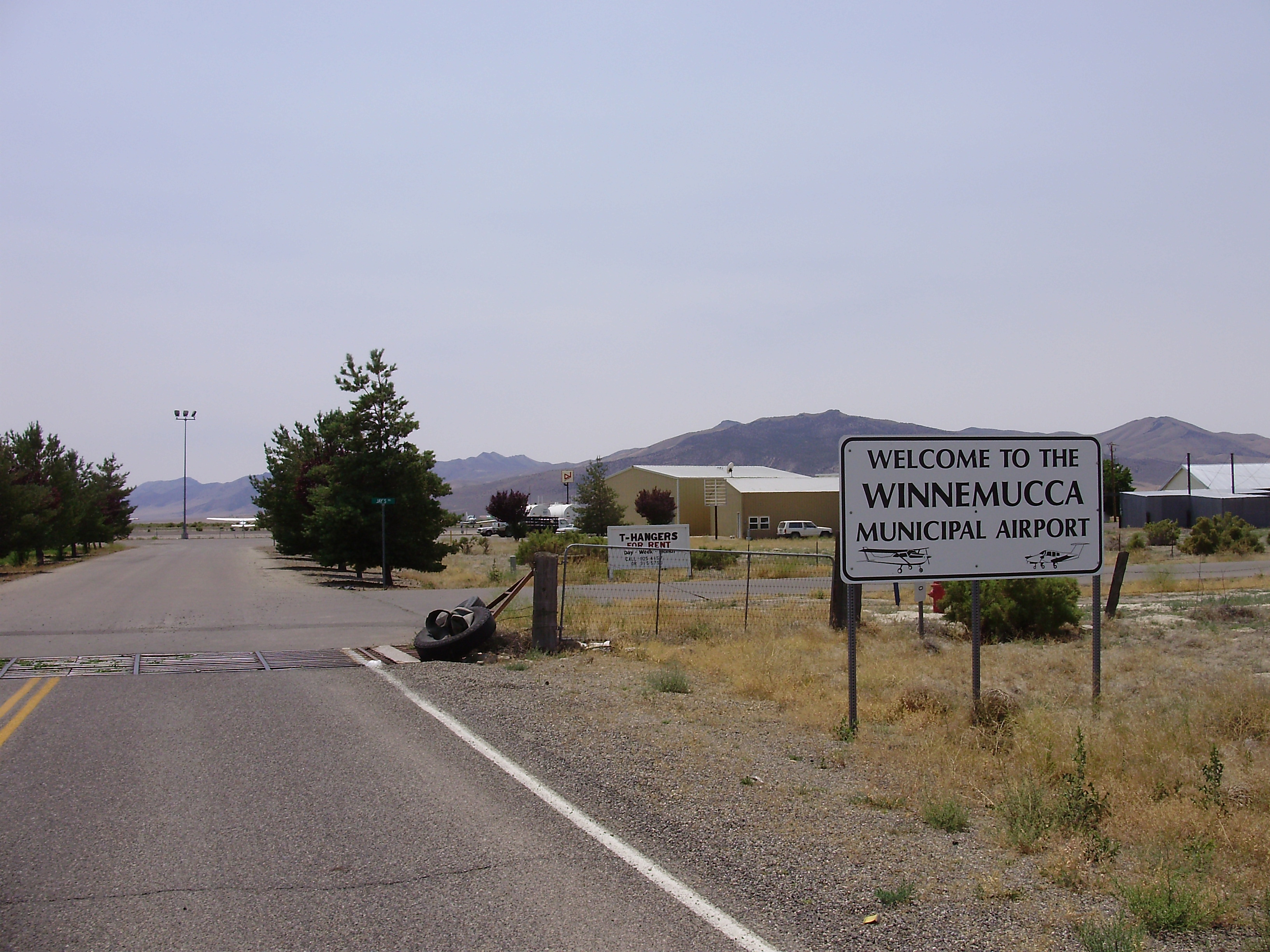
- Airport entrance
- IATA: WMC; ICAO: KWMC; FAA LID: WMC

Summary
- Airport type: Public
- Owner: City/County
- Serves: Winnemucca, Nevada
- Location: Humboldt County, Nevada
- Elevation AMSL: 4,308 ft / 1,313 m
- Coordinates: 40°53′48″N 117°48′21″W

Maps
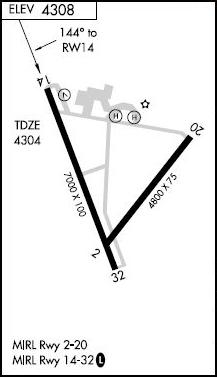

Runways
Direction	Length		Surface
Direction	ft	m	Surface
14/32	7,000	2,134	Asphalt
2/20	4,800	1,463	Asphalt

Helipads
Number	Length		Surface
Number	ft	m	Surface
H1	25	8	Concrete
H2	25	8	Concrete

Statistics (2022)
- Aircraft operations (year ending 9/28/2022): 6,925
- Based aircraft: 14
- Source: Federal Aviation Administration

Winnemucca Municipal Airport (IATA: WMC, ICAO: KWMC, FAA LID: WMC) is six miles southwest of Winnemucca, in Humboldt County, Nevada. The airport was renamed Franklin Field on April 20, 2019, in honor of Lt. Col. Irl “Leon” Franklin, a decorated Vietnam War veteran and combat pilot who earned the Silver Star for his lead role in Operation Ivory Coast.

The National Plan of Integrated Airport Systems for 2011–2015 categorized it as a general aviation facility.

== Facilities ==
The airport covers 968 acres (392 ha) at an elevation of 4,308 feet (1,313 m). It has two asphalt runways: 14/32 is 7,000 by 100 feet (2,134 x 30 m) and 2/20 is 4,800 by 75 feet (1,463 x 23 m). It has two concrete helipads (H1 and H2) each 25 by 25 feet (8 x 8 m).

In the year ending September 28, 2022 the airport had 6,925 aircraft operations, average 133 per week: 68% general aviation, 26% air taxi, and 5% military. 14 aircraft were then based at this airport: 10 single-engine and 4 ultra-light.

== See also ==
- List of airports in Nevada
