= Nevada State Route 226 =

State highway in Nevada, United States

State Route 226
- Deep Creek Highway
- Nevada State Route 226, highlighted in red

Route information
- Maintained by NDOT
- Length: 39.017 mi (62.792 km)
- Existed: 1976–present

Major junctions
- South end: SR 225
- North end: Deep Creek

Location
- Country: United States
- State: Nevada

Highway system
- Nevada State Highway System; Interstate; US; State; Pre‑1976; Scenic
← SR 225	→ SR 227

State Route 226 (SR 226) is a state highway in Elko County, Nevada, United States. It spurs off State Route 225 north of Elko, and heads north for 39 miles (63 km) to Deep Creek.

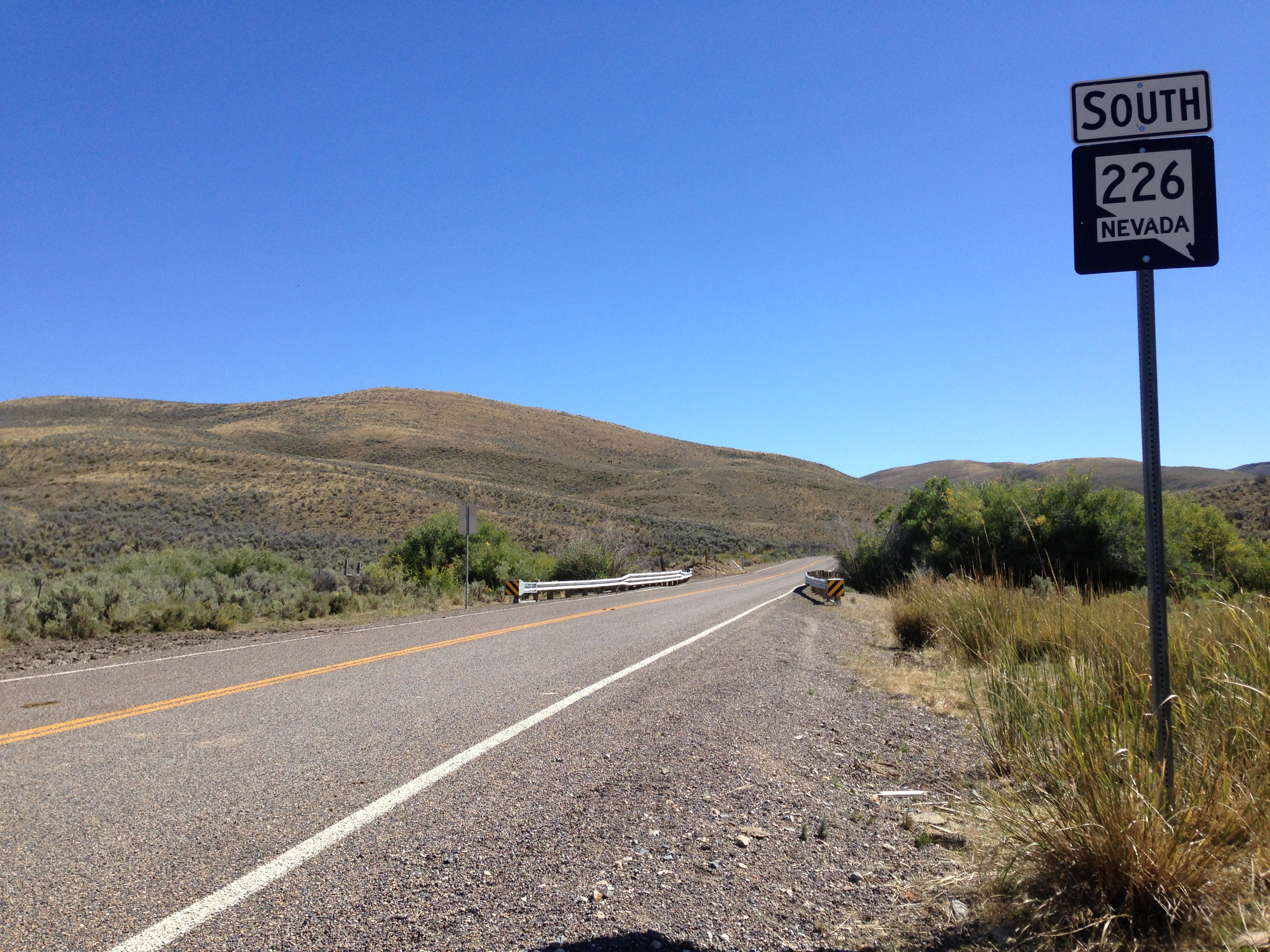
View from the north end of SR 226 looking southbound

== History ==
SR 226 was part of the State Route 11 before 1976.

SR 226 was part of a much-longer State Route 11 prior to 1976.

== Major intersections ==
The entire route is in Elko County.

Location	mi	km	Destinations	Notes
	0	0.0	SR 225 (Mountain City Hwy) – Elko, Mountain City, Owyhee	
			Old SR 18 – Tuscarora	
Deep Creek	31	50		
1.000 mi = 1.609 km; 1.000 km = 0.621 mi
