= Patsville, Nevada =

Unincorporated community in Nevada, US

- Unincorporated community
- Location within the state of Nevada Patsville (the United States)
- Coordinates: 41°48′37″N 115°57′27″W
- Country: United States
- State: Nevada
- County: Elko
- Time zone: UTC-8 (Pacific (PST))
  - Summer (DST): UTC-7 (PDT)
- ZIP codes: 89831

Patsville is an extinct town in Elko County, in the U.S. state of Nevada. The GNIS classifies it as a populated place. Located approximately two miles south of Mountain City on NSR 225, the community is part of the Elko Micropolitan Statistical Area.

The former mining community existed from about 1932 until 1949.

== See also ==
- Government Peak Wilderness
