= Shanty town (disambiguation) =

A shanty town is a settlement of improvised buildings known as shanties or shacks.

Shanty town or Shantytown may also refer to:

== Geography ==
=== New Zealand ===
- Shantytown Heritage Park

=== United States ===
- Shanty Town, Minnesota
- Shantytown, Nevada
- Shantytown, Wisconsin

== Media ==
- "The Southsiders", 1932 Swedish comedy film, also released in the U.S. as Shanty Town
- "Shantytown", 1943 film
- "Shanty Town", 2023 TV series
- "007 (Shanty Town)", 1967 song
