= Duck Valley Indian Reservation =

Native American reservation in the United States

Duck Valley Indian Reservation Tokkapatih
- Indian reservation
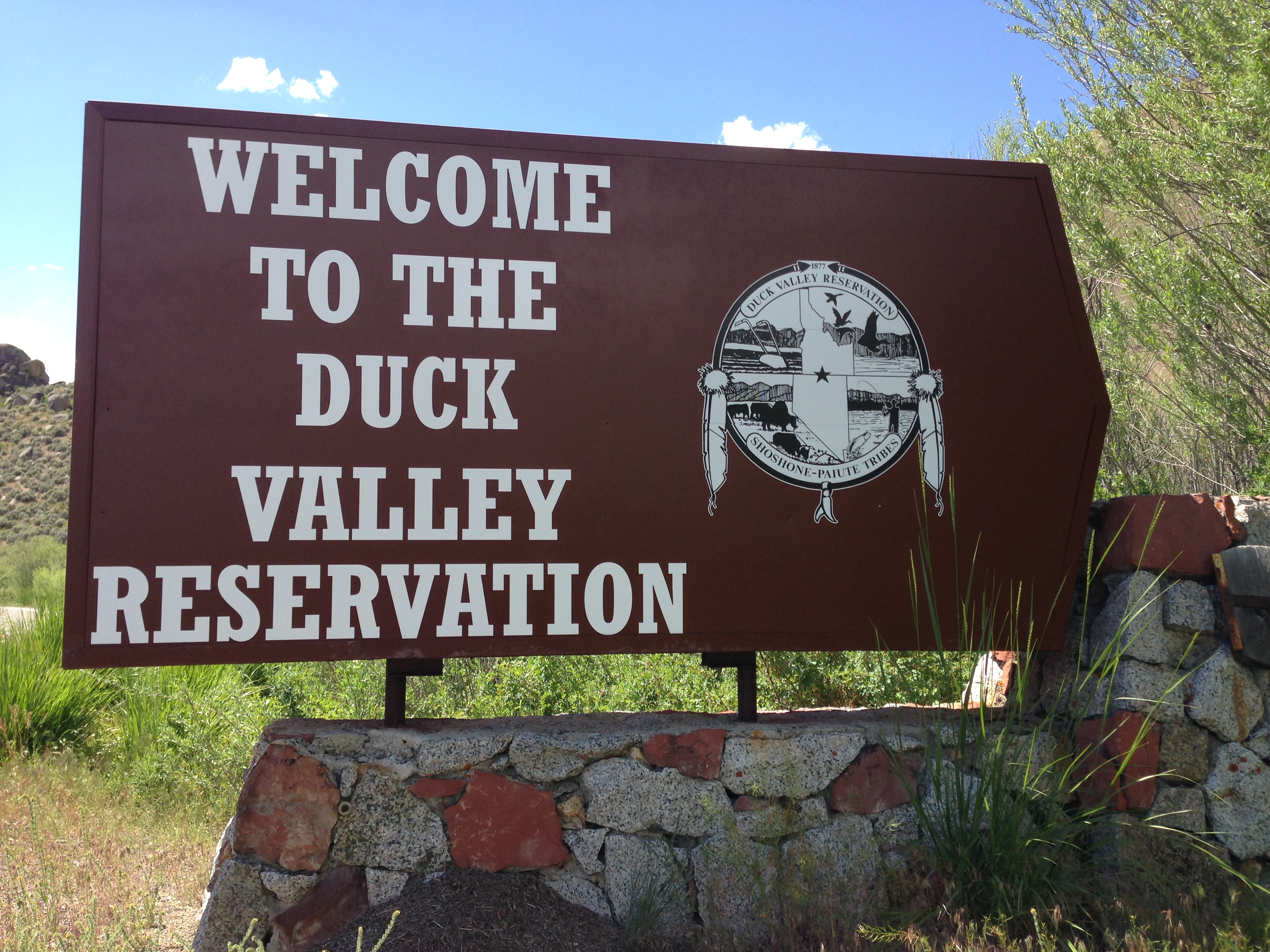
- Entrance sign to the Duck Valley Indian Reservation

- Location of the Duck Valley Indian Reservation

- Location in the United States
- Coordinates: 42°00′N 116°11′W
- Tribal nation: Shoshone–Paiute Tribes of the Duck Valley Indian Reservation
- Country: United States
- States: Idaho and Nevada
- Counties: Owyhee County, Idaho; Elko County, Nevada
- Reservation established: 1877
- Tribal headquarters: Owyhee, Nevada

Government
  - Type: Federally recognized tribal government

Area
  - Total: 1,166.5 km^{2} (450.4 sq mi)
- Time zone: UTC−7 (Mountain Time Zone)
  - Summer (DST): UTC−6 (Mountain Daylight Time)
- Website: shopaitribes.org

The Duck Valley Indian Reservation (Shoshoni: Tokkapatih) is a Native American reservation and sovereign tribal jurisdiction of the Shoshone–Paiute Tribes of the Duck Valley Indian Reservation, a federally recognized tribal nation in the United States. The reservation is situated in the Great Basin region of the western United States and extends across the Idaho–Nevada state line, encompassing portions of Owyhee County, Idaho and Elko County, Nevada. Duck Valley is one of the relatively few Indian reservations in the United States whose boundaries span two states, creating a distinctive administrative and jurisdictional landscape.

Established in the late nineteenth century through executive actions of the federal government, the reservation occupies approximately 450 square miles (1,166 km^{2}) along the 42nd parallel north in a remote high-desert environment characteristic of the northern Great Basin. The community of Owyhee, Nevada serves as the principal population center and administrative headquarters of the tribal government. The reservation lies within a region historically inhabited by both Western Shoshone and Northern Paiute peoples, whose descendants today comprise the modern Shoshone–Paiute Tribes.

The reservation functions as the homeland and political jurisdiction of the tribes, which exercise inherent powers of self-government under the framework of federal recognition in the United States. As a federally recognized tribal nation, the Shoshone–Paiute Tribes maintain a government-to-government relationship with the United States federal government while administering tribal programs, services, and infrastructure for residents of the reservation.

Because the reservation spans the Idaho–Nevada state boundary, residents participate in overlapping systems of governance, including tribal elections and state and county elections administered by either Idaho or Nevada depending on residence. Residents interact with both state governments for matters such as elections administration, taxation, and motor-vehicle licensing while remaining citizens of the sovereign tribal nation.

The Shoshone–Paiute Tribes are one of five federally recognized tribes in the state of Idaho with a reservation, alongside the Coeur d'Alene Tribe, the Kootenai Tribe of Idaho, the Nez Perce Tribe, and the Shoshone-Bannock Tribes. The reservation also forms part of a broader intertribal landscape within Nevada, which is home to 28 recognized Tribal Nations, bands, colonies, and communities.

== History ==
On April 16, 1877, President Rutherford B. Hayes established the Duck Valley Western Shoshone Reservation by Executive Order; it was also used for Northern Paiute people. Despite the Native Americans having a designated reservation, local settlers and some politicians tried to force the tribal members off the valuable Duck Valley lands in 1884, suggesting they should join their Western Shoshone kinsmen at the reservation at Fort Hall, Idaho. The bands' chiefs successfully resisted these efforts to be displaced from their lands.

Meanwhile, the Northern Paiute band joined with another branch of Shoshone in the Bannock War of 1878. Survivors were sent to a prisoner-of-war camp at the Yakama Indian Reservation in Yakima County, Washington. Upon their release, the Northern Paiute returned to the Duck Valley. President Grover Cleveland expanded the reservation by Executive Order on May 4, 1886, to accommodate the Paiute.

President William Howard Taft expanded the reservation to its current size by Executive Order on July 1, 1910. It was unusual to have two federal government actions to enlarge the reservation after it was established; most federal actions have been taken to reduce the size of Indian reservations.

The Shoshone–Paiute Tribes of the Duck Valley Indian Reservation are one of five federally recognized tribes in the state of Idaho, each with a reservation. The others are the Coeur d'Alene, Kootenai Tribe of Idaho, Nez Perce, and the Shoshone-Bannock tribes. The Duck Valley Reservation extends across the Idaho–Nevada border. Nevada is home to 28 Tribal Nations, bands, colonies, and communities recognized by the State of Nevada.

== Legal actions and legislative advocacy ==
The Shoshone–Paiute Tribes of the Duck Valley Indian Reservation have participated in numerous legal proceedings and legislative initiatives concerning tribal sovereignty, water rights, federal funding obligations, voting access, and public infrastructure affecting reservation residents. These efforts have involved federal courts, interstate water adjudications, congressional legislation, and state election administration.

=== Snake River Basin Adjudication ===
The tribes were participants in the Snake River Basin Adjudication (SRBA), a major water-rights proceeding initiated by the State of Idaho in 1987 to determine water rights throughout the Snake River basin.

In the adjudication, the United States asserted federal reserved water rights on behalf of the Shoshone–Paiute Tribes under the Winters doctrine. In 2006 the Fifth Judicial District Court of Idaho entered a revised consent decree quantifying the tribes’ water rights within the basin.

=== Duck Valley water-rights settlement ===
Following decades of negotiations among the tribes, the United States, the State of Nevada, and regional irrigation users, Congress enacted the Shoshone–Paiute Tribes of the Duck Valley Reservation Water Rights Settlement Act as part of the Omnibus Public Land Management Act of 2009.

The legislation ratified a negotiated settlement resolving tribal water-rights claims associated with the Owyhee River system and established federal trust funds for irrigation rehabilitation, water infrastructure improvements, and agricultural development on the reservation.

During congressional hearings on the settlement legislation, tribal leadership—including former Tribal Chairman Kyle Prior—provided testimony before the United States Senate Committee on Indian Affairs.

Subsequent legislation has been introduced in Congress to correct technical provisions of the settlement and authorize payment of interest associated with settlement trust funds.

=== Contract support cost litigation ===
The tribes were involved in litigation concerning federal funding obligations under the Indian Self-Determination and Education Assistance Act. In Cherokee Nation of Oklahoma v. Leavitt, the Cherokee Nation and the Shoshone–Paiute Tribes challenged the failure of the United States Department of Health and Human Services and the Indian Health Service to pay full contract support costs promised in tribal self-governance agreements.

In 2005 the Supreme Court of the United States ruled that the federal government must honor contractual obligations to pay tribes the full amount of contract support costs even when congressional appropriations were insufficient to satisfy all tribal contracts.

=== Tribal court and sovereignty litigation ===
Several cases involving the tribes have addressed issues of tribal jurisdiction and sovereign immunity.

In Arlen J. Atkins v. Shoshone-Paiute Tribe (2008), the Intertribal Court of Appeals of Nevada reviewed a criminal appeal originating from the Duck Valley Tribal Court.

In Thomas Howard v. Shoshone-Paiute Tribes (2015), the United States Court of Appeals for the Ninth Circuit held that the tribe is not a “person” subject to liability under the False Claims Act, reaffirming principles of tribal sovereign immunity.

In Magee v. Shoshone Paiute Tribes of the Duck Valley Reservation (2020), the United States District Court for the District of Nevada dismissed civil claims against the tribe and several tribal officials, including Brian Thomas and Arnold Thomas, on sovereign-immunity grounds.

=== Voting rights litigation ===
In 2022 the tribes filed litigation against Elko County, Nevada alleging unequal access to early voting and polling locations for tribal voters residing on the reservation.

At the time of the lawsuit, reservation voters had access to only eight hours of early voting compared with more than one hundred hours available in Elko, Nevada.

The litigation was supported by the advocacy organization Four Directions Native Vote, including advocates Oliver J. Semans and Bret Healy.

Following court proceedings, Elko County expanded early voting opportunities on the reservation and established additional voting access for tribal residents.

=== Education infrastructure advocacy ===
Tribal leadership has also engaged in legislative advocacy concerning public education infrastructure serving the reservation. In 2023 Governor Joe Lombardo signed legislation authorizing approximately $64.5 million to fund construction of a replacement Owyhee Combined School operated by the Elko County School District.

Subsequent court proceedings in Nevada addressed constitutional questions concerning portions of the legislation that required additional property-tax revenue contributions from Elko County.

These legal and legislative actions collectively reflect the tribes’ continuing efforts to protect treaty rights, defend tribal sovereignty, expand voting access, and secure public infrastructure for reservation residents.

== Government and intergovernmental relations ==
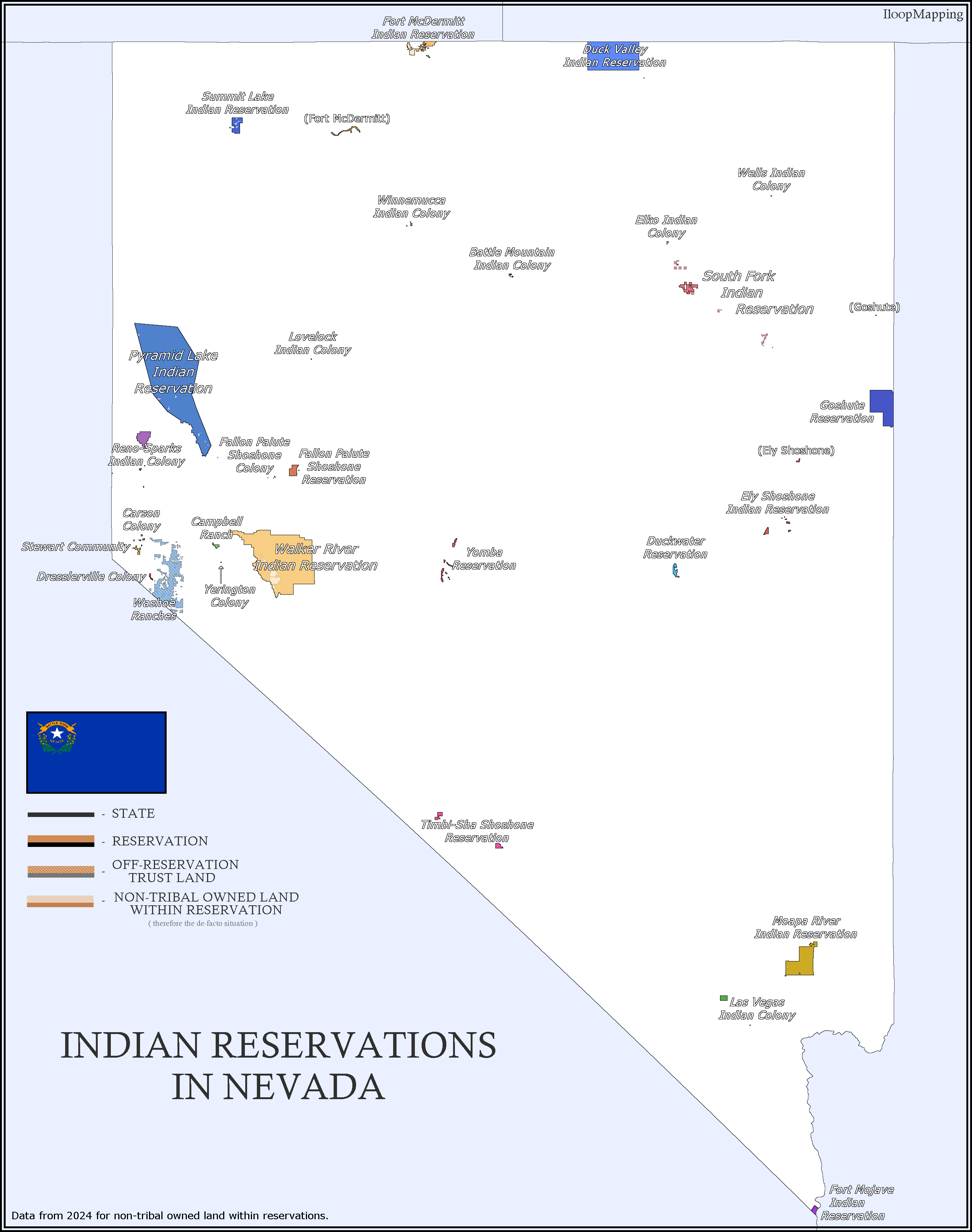
Maps of the Duck Valley Reservation and neighboring reservations in Nevada and Idaho.

The Duck Valley Indian Reservation functions as the homeland and primary jurisdiction of the Shoshone–Paiute Tribes of the Duck Valley Indian Reservation, a federally recognized tribal nation exercising inherent powers of tribal self-government. Because the reservation spans the boundary between Idaho and Nevada, residents interact with multiple overlapping systems of governance, including tribal, county, state, and federal governments.

Citizens of the tribe elect their own tribal leadership under the tribe’s constitution while also participating in United States elections. Residents living on the Nevada portion of the reservation vote in elections administered by Elko County, Nevada and the State of Nevada, while residents living on the Idaho portion vote in elections administered by Owyhee County, Idaho and the State of Idaho.

Nevada law provides a statutory process through which federally recognized tribes may request polling places, early-voting locations, and ballot drop boxes within the boundaries of Indian reservations. Under Nevada Revised Statutes §293.2733, a county clerk must establish at least one polling place within the boundaries of an Indian reservation for a primary or general election upon request of the tribe. Related provisions of Nevada law authorize temporary branch polling places for early voting within reservations and require consultation between county election officials and tribal governments regarding election administration.

In 2022 the Shoshone–Paiute Tribes of the Duck Valley Indian Reservation filed litigation against Elko County alleging unequal access to early voting and polling locations for tribal voters residing on the reservation. The legal challenge resulted in expanded early-voting access and the establishment of additional polling opportunities on the reservation for Nevada elections. The effort was widely described as a significant advancement for voting access for Native communities in northeastern Nevada.

Because the reservation straddles the Idaho–Nevada state line, residents also interact with both state governments for services such as taxation, elections administration, and motor-vehicle licensing. Idaho law recognizes that enrolled tribal members residing on a federally recognized reservation located in whole or in part within the state are considered Idaho residents for purposes of vehicle registration and titling.

== Intertribal relationships ==
The Duck Valley Indian Reservation is part of the broader cultural and historical landscape of the northern Great Basin. The Shoshone–Paiute Tribes of the Duck Valley Indian Reservation share longstanding linguistic, cultural, and historical relationships with neighboring tribal nations whose citizens descend from Western Shoshone and Northern Paiute peoples. These intertribal connections reflect shared ancestry, regional trade networks, seasonal land use patterns, and family ties that predate the establishment of reservation boundaries in the late nineteenth century.

Tribal nations with closely related historical and cultural connections in the region include:

- Fort Hall Indian Reservation – homeland of the Shoshone-Bannock Tribes
- Fort McDermitt Indian Reservation – home of the Fort McDermitt Paiute and Shoshone Tribe
- Duckwater Shoshone Tribe of the Duckwater Reservation
- Summit Lake Indian Reservation
- Pyramid Lake Indian Reservation
- Reno-Sparks Indian Colony
- Bishop Paiute Tribe

These relationships reflect the broader distribution of Numic-speaking peoples across the Great Basin and surrounding regions. Contemporary intertribal cooperation continues through cultural exchange, regional organizations, and shared participation in political, economic, and ceremonial activities among tribes of the Great Basin.

== Notable citizens ==
- Tina Manning (died 1979) – water rights activist and education specialist from the Duck Valley community. Manning was killed in a 1979 house fire at her parents' home along with her mother, Leah Hicks Manning, their three children, and an unborn son. Her father, former tribal chairman Arthur Manning, survived the fire with severe burns. Early reports from the federal investigation attributed the fire to possible spontaneous combustion at three electrical outlets, though the origin of the fire was ultimately characterized as unknown.
- Arthur Manning – former chairman of the Shoshone–Paiute Tribes of the Duck Valley Indian Reservation who served in tribal leadership during a period of significant political and community development on the reservation.

== Transportation ==
The Duck Valley Indian Reservation is located in a remote region along the Idaho–Nevada border, approximately 100 miles from both Elko, Nevada and Mountain Home, Idaho. Transportation access to the community of Owyhee, Nevada and surrounding areas relies primarily on state highways connecting the reservation to regional service centers and interstate highway networks.

=== Highways ===
- Idaho State Highway 51 runs north from the reservation to Bruneau, Idaho and Mountain Home, Idaho, where it connects to Interstate 84.
- Nevada State Route 225 runs south from the reservation to Elko, Nevada, where it connects to Interstate 80.

These highways form the primary north–south transportation corridor through the reservation and provide the main roadway access for residents traveling to regional employment, healthcare, and commercial services.

=== Public transit ===
Public transportation services for residents of the Duck Valley Indian Reservation are provided by the Duck Valley Shoshone–Paiute Tribes Regional Transit Program. The system is supported through the Federal Transit Administration’s Tribal Transit Program and provides transportation for tribal members to access healthcare, education, employment, and other essential services both on and off the reservation.

=== Air transportation ===
Owyhee Airport (FAA identifier: 10U) is a public-use general aviation airport located approximately 4 nautical miles west of Owyhee, Nevada, within the Duck Valley Indian Reservation. The airport is owned by the Shoshone–Paiute Tribes.

The airport was originally constructed around 1942 by the United States Army Air Forces as the Owyhee Flight Strip and served as an emergency landing airfield for military training flights during World War II. After the war it was transferred for civilian use.

Owyhee Airport has one asphalt runway measuring approximately 4,700 feet in length and supports general aviation, medical transport flights, emergency services, and government aircraft serving the reservation.
