= Bevent (community), Wisconsin =

Unincorporated community in Wisconsin, United States

Bevent, Wisconsin
- unincorporated community
- Location within Wisconsin Location within the United States
- Coordinates: 44°46′14″N 89°23′22″W
- Country: United States
- State: Wisconsin
- County: Marathon
- Elevation: 1,220 ft (370 m)
- Time zone: UTC-6 (Central (CST))
  - Summer (DST): UTC-5 (CDT)
- Area codes: 715 and 534
- GNIS feature ID: 1561665

Bevent is an unincorporated community located in the towns of Bevent and Reid, Marathon County, Wisconsin, United States.
