= Nevada State Route 789 =

State highway in Nevada, United States

State Route 789
- Getchell Mine Road
- SR 789 highlighted in red

Route information
- Maintained by NDOT
- Length: 16.249 mi (26.150 km)
- Existed: 1976–present

Major junctions
- South end: I-80 in Golconda
- North end: Midas Road

Location
- Country: United States
- State: Nevada
- County: Humboldt

Highway system
- Nevada State Highway System; Interstate; US; State; Pre‑1976; Scenic
← SR 774	→ SR 794

State Route 789 (SR 789) is a state highway in Humboldt County, Nevada connecting the town of Golconda to nearby mining districts. Much of the route previously existed as State Route 18 prior to 1976.

== Route description ==
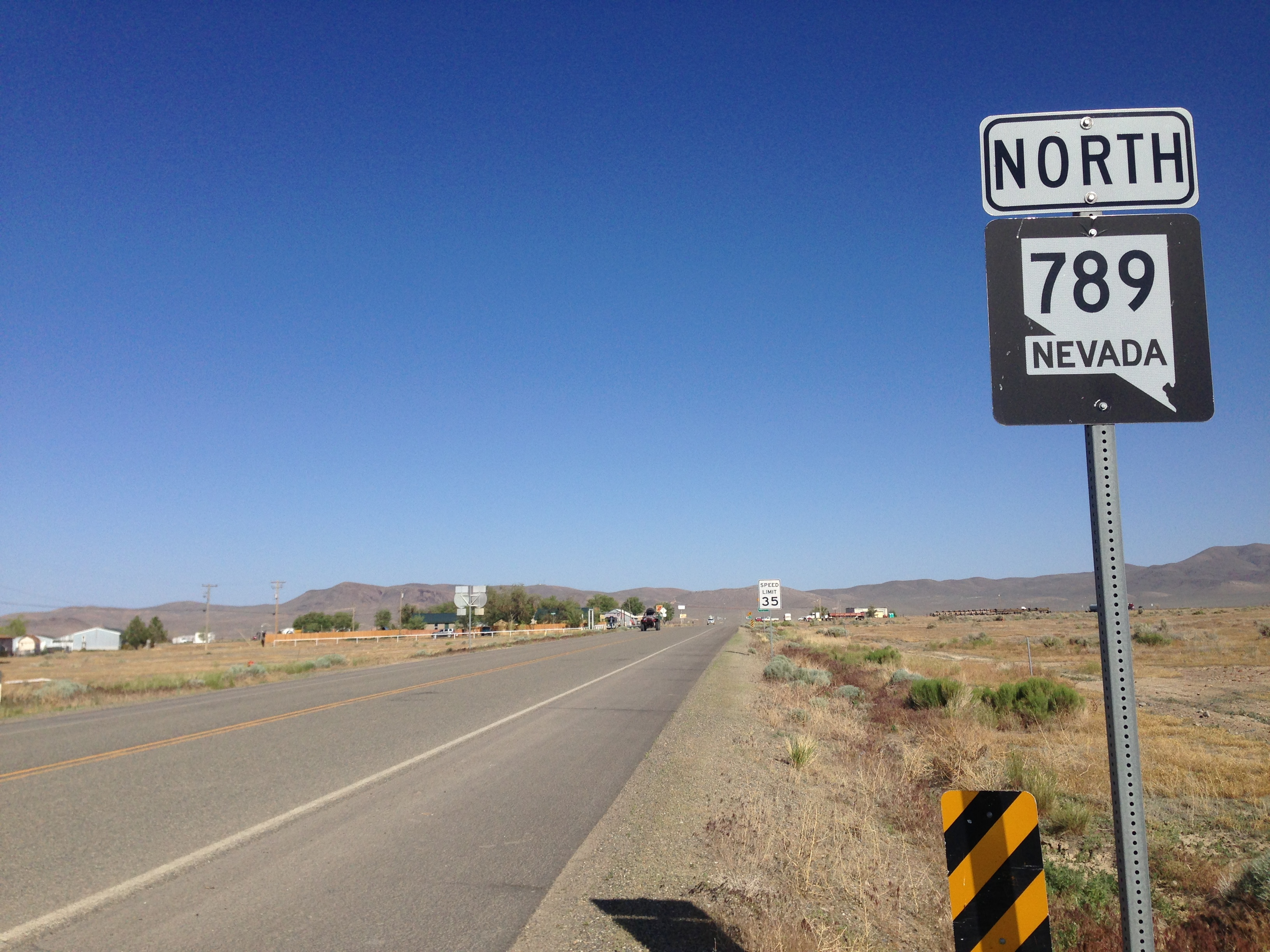
View of northbound SR 789 near its southern terminus

SR 789 begins at the westbound entrance ramp to Interstate 80 in the town of Golconda. From there, the route travels southeast, paralleling the Interstate highway. After less than one mile (1.6 km), the route leaves the Golconda town limits. SR 789 parallels I-80 in its southeasterly direction for over two miles (3.2 km) before turning sharply to the northeast. The route passes through Emigrant Canyon, briefly paralleling the Humboldt River on its trek northward. State Route 789 continues northeast to reach its terminus just north of Midas Road, leading to access roads leading to several mining operations including Getchell Mine.

== History ==
Much of SR 789 was previously designated as part of State Route 18

Much of SR 789 has origins in former State Route 18. State Route 18 had been established by 1929 as an unimproved road connecting U.S. Route 40/State Route 1 at Golconda to State Route 11 at Tuscarora via the town of Midas. The original routing, however, entered Golconda on the north, more closely following the Humboldt River and Western Pacific Railroad (now part of Union Pacific). This alignment gave SR 18 a length of about 88 miles (142 km). By 1946, the overall length of State Route 18 had increased to 92 miles (148 km) due to some realignments in the route, including an extension east from Tuscarora to intersect SR 11 (which had been shifted eastward to bypass the town). The westernmost 14 miles of the route had also been realigned and paved by this time. By 1963, construction of future Interstate 80 reached the Golconda area, bypassing the original US 40 route. The two miles (3.2 km) of US 40 between Golconda and the SR 18 junction was added onto SR 18 to connect the state highway to the new federal route.

State Route 18 remained unchanged for several years after gaining mileage at its west end. However, the route ended up being altered in the 1976 renumbering of Nevada's state highway system that began on July 1, 1976. The paved 16 miles (26 km) on the west end of SR 18 were renumbered to present-day State Route 789, while the remainder of the route was removed from the state highway system.

== Major intersections ==
The entire route is in Humboldt County.

Location	mi	km	Destinations	Notes
Golconda	0.00	0.00	I-80 west – Winnemucca	
Golconda			To I-80 east – Battle Mountain	
	16.25	26.15	Midas Road	
1.000 mi = 1.609 km; 1.000 km = 0.621 mi
