= Pleasant Valley, Elko County, Nevada =

- Unincorporated community
- Location within the state of Nevada
- Coordinates: 40°43′05″N 115°31′03″W
- Country: United States
- State: Nevada
- County: Elko
- Elevation: 5,860 ft (1,790 m)
- Time zone: UTC-8 (Pacific (PST))
  - Summer (DST): UTC-7 (PDT)
- GNIS feature ID: 857656

Pleasant Valley is an unincorporated community in Elko County, Nevada, United States.
