= Dinner Station, Nevada =

- Ghost town
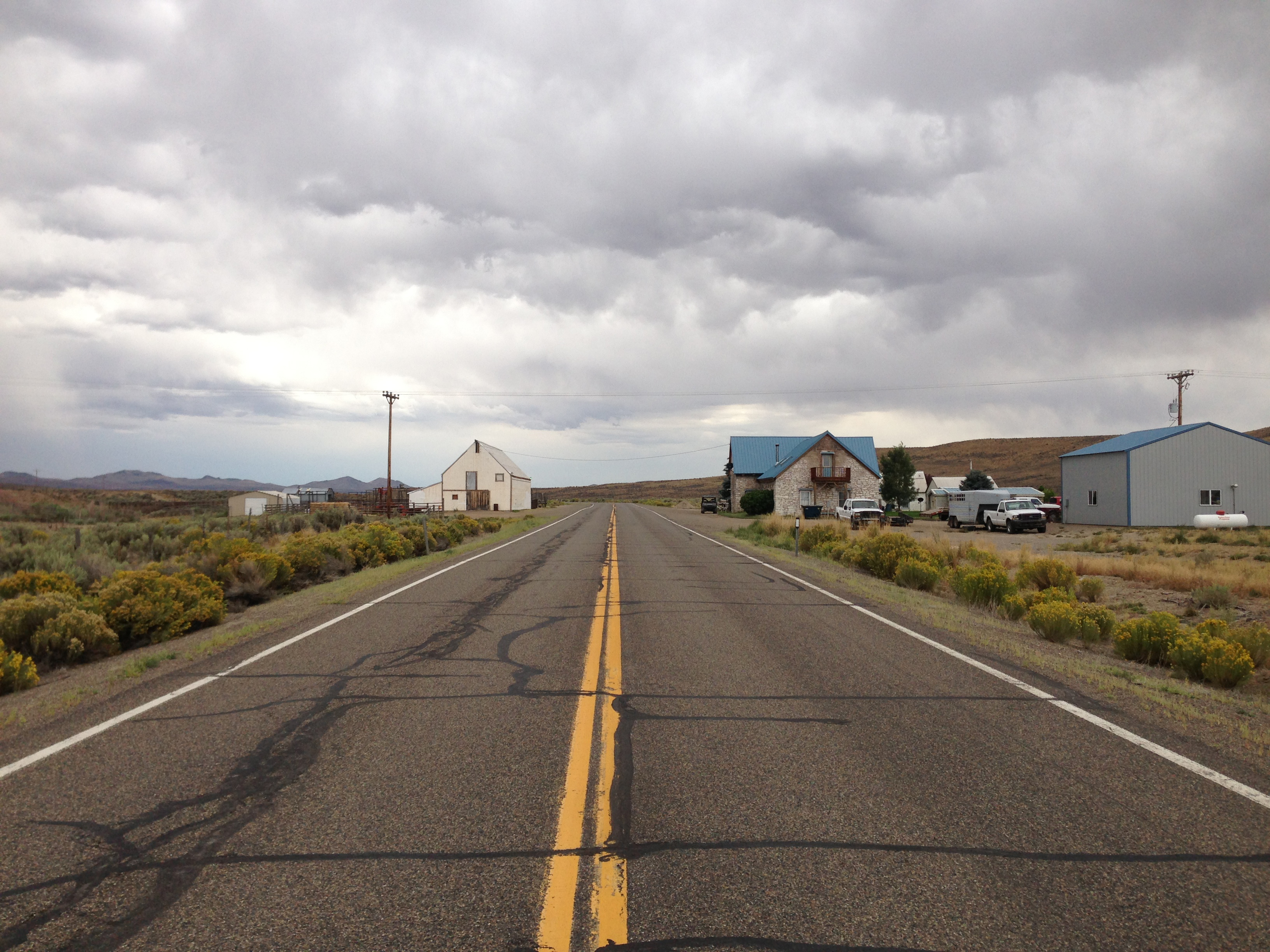

- Location within the state of Nevada Dinner Station (the United States)
- Coordinates: 41°06′0″N 115°51′55″W
- Country: United States
- State: Nevada
- County: Elko
- Elevation: 5,955 ft (1,815 m)
- Time zone: UTC-8 (Pacific (PST))
  - Summer (DST): UTC-7 (PDT)

Dinner Station is a ghost town in Elko County in the American state of Nevada. It was an important stop of several stagecoach routes in the north of Elko for many years. Dinner Station lies along State Route 225. It was marked by Nevada Historical Marker 244, but has since been removed and is now a private property.

== History ==
Dinner Station was established in the early 1870s by William C. Beachey as a stop for Tuscarora and Mountain City Stage Lines. It was originally known as Weilands. This building was destroyed by a fire in 1884 and was replaced by a two-story stone building, outbuildings, and a corral. Into the twentieth century, Dinner Station was a popular stop for cars and horse-drawn carriages and became one of the most popular inns in Elko County. However, in 1910, the stage stop had lost its importance because of the birth of the automotive industry. The stop was no longer used. A fire in 1991 destroyed the sole building, but it was restored in 1996.
