= List of the largest counties in the United States by area =

This is a list of the 104 largest counties in the United States by area. The list is based upon the total area of a county, both land and water surface, reported by the United States Census Bureau during the 2000 Census.

== List of largest counties ==
Rank	County	State	County seat	Total area	Land area
1	San Bernardino County	California	San Bernardino	20,160 sq mi (52,200 km^{2})	20,064 sq mi (51,970 km^{2})
2	Coconino County	Arizona	Flagstaff	18,661.21 sq mi (48,332.3 km^{2})	18,617.42 sq mi (48,218.9 km^{2})
3	Nye County	Nevada	Tonopah	18,158.73 sq mi (47,030.9 km^{2})	18,146.66 sq mi (46,999.6 km^{2})
4	Elko County	Nevada	Elko	17,202.94 sq mi (44,555.4 km^{2})	17,179.03 sq mi (44,493.5 km^{2})
5	Mohave County	Arizona	Kingman	13,469.71 sq mi (34,886.4 km^{2})	13,311.64 sq mi (34,477.0 km^{2})
6	Apache County	Arizona	St. Johns	11,218.42 sq mi (29,055.6 km^{2})	11,204.88 sq mi (29,020.5 km^{2})
7	Lincoln County	Nevada	Pioche	10,636.77 sq mi (27,549.1 km^{2})	10,633.61 sq mi (27,540.9 km^{2})
8	Sweetwater County	Wyoming	Green River	10,491.17 sq mi (27,172.0 km^{2})	10,425.3 sq mi (27,001 km^{2})
9	Inyo County	California	Independence	10,226.98 sq mi (26,487.8 km^{2})	10,203.1 sq mi (26,426 km^{2})
10	Harney County	Oregon	Burns	10,226.49 sq mi (26,486.5 km^{2})	10,134.33 sq mi (26,247.8 km^{2})
11	Navajo County	Arizona	Holbrook	9,959.49 sq mi (25,795.0 km^{2})	9,953.18 sq mi (25,778.6 km^{2})
12	Malheur County	Oregon	Vale	9,929.99 sq mi (25,718.6 km^{2})	9,887.09 sq mi (25,607.4 km^{2})
13	Humboldt County	Nevada	Winnemucca	9,657.87 sq mi (25,013.8 km^{2})	9,647.91 sq mi (24,988.0 km^{2})
14	Fremont County	Wyoming	Lander	9,265.8 sq mi (23,998 km^{2})	9,182.27 sq mi (23,782.0 km^{2})
15	Maricopa County	Arizona	Phoenix	9,224.27 sq mi (23,890.7 km^{2})	9,203.14 sq mi (23,836.0 km^{2})
16	Pima County	Arizona	Tucson	9,188.83 sq mi (23,799.0 km^{2})	9,186.27 sq mi (23,792.3 km^{2})
17	White Pine County	Nevada	Ely	8,896.6 sq mi (23,042 km^{2})	8,875.98 sq mi (22,988.7 km^{2})
18	Idaho County	Idaho	Grangeville	8,502.48 sq mi (22,021.3 km^{2})	8,484.88 sq mi (21,975.7 km^{2})
19	Lake County	Oregon	Lakeview	8,358.47 sq mi (21,648.3 km^{2})	8,135.75 sq mi (21,071.5 km^{2})
20	Kern County	California	Bakersfield	8,161.42 sq mi (21,138.0 km^{2})	8,140.96 sq mi (21,085.0 km^{2})
21	Yavapai County	Arizona	Prescott	8,127.78 sq mi (21,050.9 km^{2})	8,123.3 sq mi (21,039 km^{2})
22	Clark County	Nevada	Las Vegas	8,090.66 sq mi (20,954.7 km^{2})	7,910.34 sq mi (20,487.7 km^{2})
23	Carbon County	Wyoming	Rawlins	7,964.03 sq mi (20,626.7 km^{2})	7,896.14 sq mi (20,450.9 km^{2})
24	San Juan County	Utah	Monticello	7,933.09 sq mi (20,546.6 km^{2})	7,820.18 sq mi (20,254.2 km^{2})
25	Owyhee County	Idaho	Murphy	7,696.71 sq mi (19,934.4 km^{2})	7,677.98 sq mi (19,885.9 km^{2})
26	Riverside County	California	Riverside	7,303.13 sq mi (18,915.0 km^{2})	7,207.37 sq mi (18,667.0 km^{2})
27	Tooele County	Utah	Tooele	7,287.12 sq mi (18,873.6 km^{2})	6,930.35 sq mi (17,949.5 km^{2})
28	Park County	Wyoming	Cody	6,968.51 sq mi (18,048.4 km^{2})	6,942.39 sq mi (17,980.7 km^{2})
29	Catron County	New Mexico	Reserve	6,929.03 sq mi (17,946.1 km^{2})	6,927.81 sq mi (17,942.9 km^{2})
30	St. Louis County	Minnesota	Duluth	6,859.91 sq mi (17,767.1 km^{2})	6,225.16 sq mi (16,123.1 km^{2})
31	Aroostook County	Maine	Houlton	6,828.79 sq mi (17,686.5 km^{2})	6,671.54 sq mi (17,279.2 km^{2})
32	Millard County	Utah	Fillmore	6,828.01 sq mi (17,684.5 km^{2})	6,589.13 sq mi (17,065.8 km^{2})
33	Box Elder County	Utah	Brigham City	6,729.03 sq mi (17,428.1 km^{2})	5,723.34 sq mi (14,823.4 km^{2})
34	Socorro County	New Mexico	Socorro	6,648.71 sq mi (17,220.1 km^{2})	6,646.4 sq mi (17,214 km^{2})
35	Otero County	New Mexico	Alamogordo	6,627.43 sq mi (17,165.0 km^{2})	6,626.5 sq mi (17,163 km^{2})
36	Washoe County	Nevada	Reno	6,551.32 sq mi (16,967.8 km^{2})	6,342.27 sq mi (16,426.4 km^{2})
37	Siskiyou County	California	Yreka	6,347.46 sq mi (16,439.8 km^{2})	6,286.78 sq mi (16,282.7 km^{2})
38	Cochise County	Arizona	Bisbee	6,218.77 sq mi (16,106.5 km^{2})	6,169.45 sq mi (15,978.8 km^{2})
39	Brewster County	Texas	Alpine	6,192.78 sq mi (16,039.2 km^{2})	6,192.61 sq mi (16,038.8 km^{2})
40	Klamath County	Oregon	Klamath Falls	6,135.75 sq mi (15,891.5 km^{2})	5,944.19 sq mi (15,395.4 km^{2})
41	Chaves County	New Mexico	Roswell	6,075.07 sq mi (15,734.4 km^{2})	6,070.86 sq mi (15,723.5 km^{2})
42	Pershing County	Nevada	Lovelock	6,067.55 sq mi (15,714.9 km^{2})	6,036.56 sq mi (15,634.6 km^{2})
43	Fresno County	California	Fresno	6,011 sq mi (15,570 km2)	5,958 sq mi (15,430 km2)
44	Cherry County	Nebraska	Valentine	6,009.54 sq mi (15,564.6 km^{2})	5,960.52 sq mi (15,437.7 km^{2})
45	Keweenaw County	Michigan	Eagle River	5,965.96 sq mi (15,451.8 km^{2})	540.97 sq mi (1,401.1 km^{2})
46	Rio Arriba County	New Mexico	Tierra Amarilla	5,896.1 sq mi (15,271 km^{2})	5,857.63 sq mi (15,171.2 km^{2})
47	Beaverhead County	Montana	Dillon	5,572.04 sq mi (14,431.5 km^{2})	5,542.31 sq mi (14,354.5 km^{2})
48	San Juan County	New Mexico	Aztec	5,538.36 sq mi (14,344.3 km^{2})	5,514.02 sq mi (14,281.2 km^{2})
49	Lander County	Nevada	Battle Mountain	5,519.47 sq mi (14,295.4 km^{2})	5,493.63 sq mi (14,228.4 km^{2})
50	Yuma County	Arizona	Yuma	5,518.96 sq mi (14,294.0 km^{2})	5,514.09 sq mi (14,281.4 km^{2})
51	McKinley County	New Mexico	Gallup	5,455.22 sq mi (14,129.0 km^{2})	5,448.72 sq mi (14,112.1 km^{2})
52	Natrona County	Wyoming	Casper	5,375.72 sq mi (13,923.1 km^{2})	5,339.88 sq mi (13,830.2 km^{2})
53	Pinal County	Arizona	Florence	5,374.09 sq mi (13,918.8 km^{2})	5,369.59 sq mi (13,907.2 km^{2})
54	Okanogan County	Washington	Okanogan	5,315.16 sq mi (13,766.2 km^{2})	5,268.07 sq mi (13,644.2 km^{2})
55	Flathead County	Montana	Kalispell	5,256.45 sq mi (13,614.1 km^{2})	5,098.34 sq mi (13,204.6 km^{2})
56	Phillips County	Montana	Malta	5,212.17 sq mi (13,499.5 km^{2})	5,139.57 sq mi (13,311.4 km^{2})
57	Garfield County	Utah	Panguitch	5,208.2 sq mi (13,489 km^{2})	5,174.22 sq mi (13,401.2 km^{2})
58	Douglas County	Oregon	Roseburg	5,133.83 sq mi (13,296.6 km^{2})	5,036.62 sq mi (13,044.8 km^{2})
59	Hawaii County	Hawaii	Hilo	5,086.7 sq mi (13,174 km^{2})	4,028.02 sq mi (10,432.5 km^{2})
60	Valley County	Montana	Glasgow	5,061.98 sq mi (13,110.5 km^{2})	4,921 sq mi (12,750 km^{2})
61	Alger County	Michigan	Munising	5,049.08 sq mi (13,077.1 km^{2})	917.83 sq mi (2,377.2 km^{2})
62	Rosebud County	Montana	Forsyth	5,026.94 sq mi (13,019.7 km^{2})	5,012.37 sq mi (12,982.0 km^{2})
63	Churchill County	Nevada	Fallon	5,023.38 sq mi (13,010.5 km^{2})	4,929.08 sq mi (12,766.3 km^{2})
64	Big Horn County	Montana	Hardin	5,014.65 sq mi (12,987.9 km^{2})	4,994.81 sq mi (12,936.5 km^{2})
65	Custer County	Idaho	Challis	4,936.79 sq mi (12,786.2 km^{2})	4,925.45 sq mi (12,756.9 km^{2})
66	Sublette County	Wyoming	Pinedale	4,935.66 sq mi (12,783.3 km^{2})	4,882.57 sq mi (12,645.8 km^{2})
67	Garfield County	Montana	Jordan	4,847.54 sq mi (12,555.1 km^{2})	4,668.06 sq mi (12,090.2 km^{2})
68	Tulare County	California	Visalia	4,839.09 sq mi (12,533.2 km^{2})	4,823.97 sq mi (12,494.0 km^{2})
69	Lincoln County	New Mexico	Carrizozo	4,831.25 sq mi (12,512.9 km^{2})	4,830.97 sq mi (12,512.2 km^{2})
70	Campbell County	Wyoming	Gillette	4,807.25 sq mi (12,450.7 km^{2})	4,803.13 sq mi (12,440.0 km^{2})
71	Gila County	Arizona	Globe	4,795.74 sq mi (12,420.9 km^{2})	4,767.7 sq mi (12,348 km^{2})
72	Las Animas County	Colorado	Trinidad	4,775.42 sq mi (12,368.3 km^{2})	4,772.63 sq mi (12,361.1 km^{2})
73	Pecos County	Texas	Fort Stockton	4,764.73 sq mi (12,340.6 km^{2})	4,763.66 sq mi (12,337.8 km^{2})
74	Los Angeles County	California	Los Angeles	4,752.32 sq mi (12,308.5 km^{2})	4,060.87 sq mi (10,517.6 km^{2})
75	Moffat County	Colorado	Craig	4,750.94 sq mi (12,304.9 km^{2})	4,742.25 sq mi (12,282.4 km^{2})
76	San Miguel County	New Mexico	Las Vegas	4,735.63 sq mi (12,265.2 km^{2})	4,717.04 sq mi (12,217.1 km^{2})
77	Lane County	Oregon	Eugene	4,721.79 sq mi (12,229.4 km^{2})	4,554 sq mi (11,790 km^{2})
78	Lassen County	California	Susanville	4,720.37 sq mi (12,225.7 km^{2})	4,557.27 sq mi (11,803.3 km^{2})
79	Graham County	Arizona	Safford	4,641.14 sq mi (12,020.5 km^{2})	4,629.32 sq mi (11,989.9 km^{2})
80	Hudspeth County	Texas	Sierra Blanca	4,571.93 sq mi (11,841.2 km^{2})	4,571 sq mi (11,840 km^{2})
81	Lemhi County	Idaho	Salmon	4,569.5 sq mi (11,835 km^{2})	4,564.16 sq mi (11,821.1 km^{2})
82	Cibola County	New Mexico	Grants	4,541.71 sq mi (11,763.0 km^{2})	4,539.21 sq mi (11,756.5 km^{2})
83	Grant County	Oregon	Canyon City	4,529.32 sq mi (11,730.9 km^{2})	4,528.6 sq mi (11,729 km^{2})
84	San Diego County	California	San Diego	4,525.52 sq mi (11,721.0 km^{2})	4,199.89 sq mi (10,877.7 km^{2})
85	La Paz County	Arizona	Parker	4,513.36 sq mi (11,689.5 km^{2})	4,499.95 sq mi (11,654.8 km^{2})
86	Uintah County	Utah	Vernal	4,498.98 sq mi (11,652.3 km^{2})	4,477.07 sq mi (11,595.6 km^{2})
87	Imperial County	California	El Centro	4,481.73 sq mi (11,607.6 km^{2})	4,174.73 sq mi (10,812.5 km^{2})
88	Emery County	Utah	Castle Dale	4,461.54 sq mi (11,555.3 km^{2})	4,451.85 sq mi (11,530.2 km^{2})
89	Lea County	New Mexico	Lovington	4,394.02 sq mi (11,380.5 km^{2})	4,392.96 sq mi (11,377.7 km^{2})
90	Piscataquis County	Maine	Dover-Foxcroft	4,377.36 sq mi (11,337.3 km^{2})	3,966.22 sq mi (10,272.5 km^{2})
91	Fergus County	Montana	Lewistown	4,350.36 sq mi (11,267.4 km^{2})	4,339.17 sq mi (11,238.4 km^{2})
92	Yakima County	Washington	Yakima	4,311.61 sq mi (11,167.0 km^{2})	4,296.23 sq mi (11,127.2 km^{2})
93	Albany County	Wyoming	Laramie	4,308.79 sq mi (11,159.7 km^{2})	4,272.75 sq mi (11,066.4 km^{2})
94	Converse County	Wyoming	Douglas	4,265.1 sq mi (11,047 km^{2})	4,254.72 sq mi (11,019.7 km^{2})
95	Blaine County	Montana	Chinook	4,238.92 sq mi (10,978.8 km^{2})	4,226.18 sq mi (10,945.8 km^{2})
96	Sierra County	New Mexico	Truth or Consequences	4,236.3 sq mi (10,972 km^{2})	4,180.23 sq mi (10,826.7 km^{2})
97	Teton County	Wyoming	Jackson	4,221.8 sq mi (10,934 km^{2})	4,007.76 sq mi (10,380.1 km^{2})
98	Modoc County	California	Alturas	4,203.37 sq mi (10,886.7 km^{2})	3,944.1 sq mi (10,215 km^{2})
99	Eddy County	New Mexico	Carlsbad	4,197.57 sq mi (10,871.7 km^{2})	4,182.02 sq mi (10,831.4 km^{2})
100	Eureka County	Nevada	Eureka	4,179.96 sq mi (10,826.0 km^{2})	4,175.68 sq mi (10,815.0 km^{2})
101	Johnson County	Wyoming	Buffalo	4,174.71 sq mi (10,812.4 km^{2})	4,166.28 sq mi (10,790.6 km^{2})
102	Kane County	Utah	Kanab	4,108.42 sq mi (10,640.8 km^{2})	3,991.96 sq mi (10,339.1 km^{2})
103	Lincoln County	Wyoming	Kemmerer	4,089.01 sq mi (10,590.5 km^{2})	4,069.09 sq mi (10,538.9 km^{2})
104	Weld County	Colorado	Greeley	4,021.56 sq mi (10,415.8 km^{2})	3,992.45 sq mi (10,340.4 km^{2})

== Alaskan boroughs and census areas ==
Unlike most states, Alaska is divided into boroughs and census areas that serve as county-equivalents for the Census Bureau. If included with the remainder of the counties and county-equivalent areas in the United States, Alaska's boroughs and census areas would occupy the largest 11. Below is a list of these boroughs and census areas that would rank in the top 100 if included in the above list.

The Unorganized Borough, in which all of the census areas are located, is not considered a county-equivalent area and is not included in this list. With an area of 323,440 sq mi (837,700 km^{2}), it would easily top the list, outranking every state in the country (except Alaska).

The rankings in the below list reflect the rank each borough or census area would have if included with all counties and county-equivalent areas in the United States (up to #11).

Rank	Borough/Census Area	Total area	Land area
1	Yukon-Koyukuk Census Area	147,842.51 sq mi (382,910.3 km^{2})	145,899.69 sq mi (377,878.5 km^{2})
2	North Slope Borough	94,762.64 sq mi (245,434.1 km^{2})	88,817.12 sq mi (230,035.3 km^{2})
3	Bethel Census Area	45,508.46 sq mi (117,866.4 km^{2})	40,633.31 sq mi (105,239.8 km^{2})
4	Northwest Arctic Borough	40,762 sq mi (105,570 km^{2})	35,898.34 sq mi (92,976.3 km^{2})
5	Lake and Peninsula Borough	30,906.96 sq mi (80,048.7 km^{2})	23,781.96 sq mi (61,595.0 km^{2})
6	Nome Census Area	28,283.33 sq mi (73,253.5 km^{2})	23,000.91 sq mi (59,572.1 km^{2})
7	Matanuska-Susitna Borough	25,259.79 sq mi (65,422.6 km^{2})	24,681.54 sq mi (63,924.9 km^{2})
8	Southeast Fairbanks Census Area	25,061.19 sq mi (64,908.2 km^{2})	24,814.86 sq mi (64,270.2 km^{2})
9	Kenai Peninsula Borough	24,754.6 sq mi (64,114 km^{2})	16,013.26 sq mi (41,474.2 km^{2})
10	Copper River Census Area	24,692 sq mi (63,950 km^{2})	24,692 sq mi (63,950 km^{2})
11	Dillingham Census Area	20,928.41 sq mi (54,204.3 km^{2})	18,674.78 sq mi (48,367.5 km^{2})
12	Kusilvak Census Area	19,669.24 sq mi (50,943.1 km^{2})	17,193.5 sq mi (44,531 km^{2})
13	Aleutians East Borough	15,011.6 sq mi (38,880 km^{2})	6,988.14 sq mi (18,099.2 km^{2})
14	Aleutians West Census Area	14,116.51 sq mi (36,561.6 km^{2})	4,396.77 sq mi (11,387.6 km^{2})
15	Denali Borough	12,774.53 sq mi (33,085.9 km^{2})	12,749.65 sq mi (33,021.4 km^{2})
16	Kodiak Island Borough	12,023.67 sq mi (31,141.2 km^{2})	6,559.85 sq mi (16,989.9 km^{2})
17	Hoonah-Angoon Census Area	10,914 sq mi (28,270 km^{2})	7,525 sq mi (19,490 km^{2})
18	Chugach Census Area	9,530 sq mi (24,700 km^{2})	9,530 sq mi (24,700 km^{2})
19	Yakutat City and Borough	9,459.28 sq mi (24,499.4 km^{2})	7,650.46 sq mi (19,814.6 km^{2})
20	Prince of Wales-Hyder Census Area	7,683 sq mi (19,900 km^{2})	3,923 sq mi (10,160 km^{2})
21	Fairbanks North Star Borough	7,444.02 sq mi (19,279.9 km^{2})	7,366.24 sq mi (19,078.5 km^{2})
22	Sitka City and Borough	4,811.53 sq mi (12,461.8 km^{2})	2,873.98 sq mi (7,443.6 km^{2})
23	Petersburg Borough	3,829 sq mi (9,920 km^{2})	2,921 sq mi (7,570 km^{2})
24	Wrangell City and Borough	3,476.61 sq mi (9,004.4 km^{2})	2,555.99 sq mi (6,620.0 km^{2})
25	Juneau City and Borough	3,255 sq mi (8,430 km^{2})	2,716.7 sq mi (7,036 km^{2})
26	Haines Borough	2,726 sq mi (7,060 km^{2})	2,319 sq mi (6,010 km^{2})
27	Skagway Borough	464.3 sq mi (1,203 km^{2})	452.4 sq mi (1,172 km^{2})
