= Owyhee Airport =

Airport in Nevada, United States

- IATA: none; ICAO: none; FAA LID: 1ØU

Summary
- Airport type: Public
- Owner: Shoshone-Paiute Tribes
- Serves: Owyhee, Nevada
- Elevation AMSL: 5,377 ft (1,639 m)
- Coordinates: 41°57′13″N 116°10′55″W

Map
- Location of airport in Nevada 1ØU (the United States)

Runways
Direction	Length		Surface
Direction	ft	m	Surface
5/23	4,700	1,433	Asphalt

Statistics (2022)
- Aircraft operations (year ending 8/31/2022): 1,980
- Source: Federal Aviation Administration

Owyhee Airport (FAA LID: 1ØU) is a public use airport located 4 nautical miles (4.6 mi; 7.4 km) west of the central business district of Owyhee, in Elko County, Nevada, United States. It is owned by the Shoshone-Paiute Tribes and is located within the Duck Valley Indian Reservation.

The National Plan of Integrated Airport Systems for 2011–2015 categorized it as a general aviation facility.

== History ==
The airport was built by the United States Army Air Forces about 1942, and was known as Owyhee Flight Strip. It was an emergency landing airfield for military aircraft on training flights. It was closed after World War II, and was turned over for local government use by the War Assets Administration (WAA).

== Facilities and aircraft ==
Owyhee Airport covers an area of 728 acres (295 ha) at an elevation of 5,377 feet (1,639 m) above mean sea level. It has one runway designated 5/23 with an asphalt surface measuring 4,700 by 60 feet (1,433 by 18 m). For the 12-month period ending August 31, 2022, the airport had 1,980 aircraft operations, an average of 38 per week, 91% general aviation, and 9% military.

== See also ==
- List of airports in Nevada
