= Elko County, Nevada =

County in Nevada, United States

- County
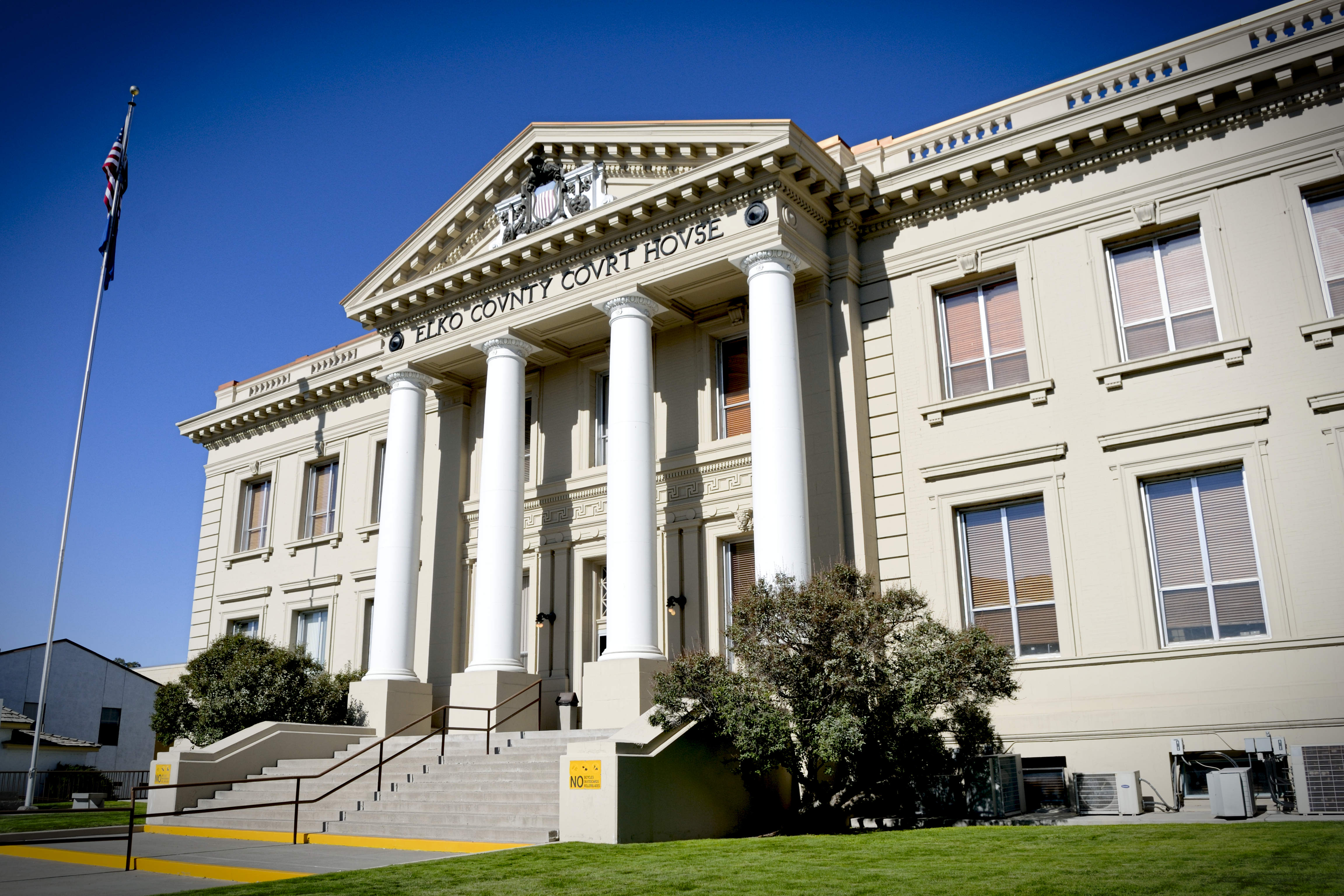
- Elko County Courthouse in Elko

- Flag

- Location within the U.S. state of Nevada
- Coordinates: 41°08′N 115°21′W
- Country: United States
- State: Nevada
- Founded: 1869; 157 years ago
- Named for: Elko
- Seat: Elko
- Largest city: Elko

Area
  - Total: 17,203 sq mi (44,560 km^{2})
  - Land: 17,170 sq mi (44,500 km^{2})
  - Water: 33 sq mi (85 km^{2}) 0.2%

Population (2020)
  - Total: 53,702
  - Estimate (2025): 54,815 ▲
  - Density: 3.128/sq mi (1.208/km^{2})

Time zones
- Majority of county: UTC−8 (Pacific)
  - Summer (DST): UTC−7 (PDT)
- West Wendover: UTC−7 (Mountain)
  - Summer (DST): UTC−6 (MDT)
- ZIP Codes: 89801, 89802, 89803, 89815, 89822, 89823, 89824, 89825, 89826, 89828, 89830, 89831, 89832, 89833, 89834, 89835, 89883.
- Congressional district: 2nd
- Website: elkocountynv.net

Elko County is a county in the northeastern corner of Nevada, United States. As of the 2020 census, the population was 53,702. Its county seat is Elko. The county was established on March 5, 1869, from Lander County. Elko County is the fourth-largest county by area in the contiguous United States. It is one of only 10 counties in the U.S. with more than 10,000 square miles (25,900 km^{2}) of area. Elko County is the second-largest county by area in Nevada, with only Nye County being larger. Elko County is part of the Elko micropolitan statistical area. It contains 49.8 percent of the Duck Valley Indian Reservation, set up in the late 19th century for the Shoshone-Paiute peoples; they are a federally recognized tribe. Although slightly more than 50% of the reservation is across the border in Owyhee County, Idaho, the majority of tribal members live on the Nevada side. The reservation's land area is 450.391 square miles (1,166.5 km^{2}).

== History ==
This area was long inhabited by Native American tribes of the Plateau, particularly the Western Shoshone, Northern Paiute, and Bannock peoples. Their traditional ways were disrupted after European-American settlement, as the two cultures competed for resources and had differing conceptions of land use and property.

Elko County was established in 1869 from Lander County; the name was taken from the name of the county seat, Elko.

In 1877 what became known as the Duck Valley Indian Reservation was established by presidential executive order for the Western Shoshone in this area, after they signed treaties with the United States. Later the Paiute became involved in the Bannock War, but after they were allowed to return from exile in Washington State, in 1886 another executive order was used to expand the reservation to accommodate them. The federally recognized tribe of the two peoples together conducts farming and ranching in this high desert territory.

The population of the county increased markedly in the late 20th century as the economy improved.

On March 14, 2014, the Bureau of Land Management of the United States Department of the Interior sold 29 oil and gas leases for $1.27 million to a collection of six companies that included Noble Energy. The transaction was the first such in Nevada.

== Geography ==
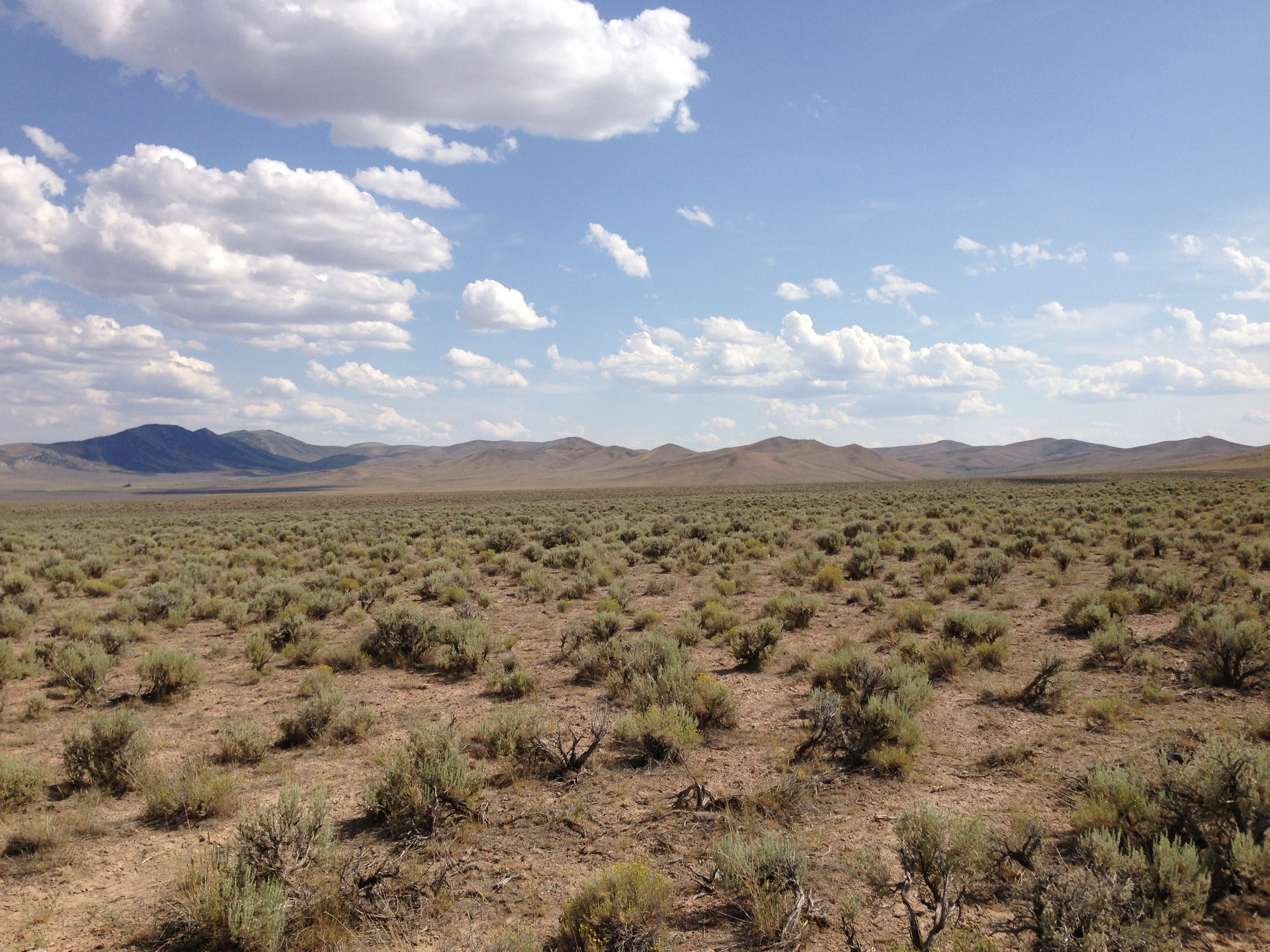
Sagebrush steppe in Elko County, Nevada along US 93. This view is characteristic of most of the county.

According to the U.S. Census Bureau, the county has a total area of 17,203 square miles (44,560 km^{2}), of which 17,170 square miles (44,500 km^{2}) is land and 33 square miles (85 km^{2}) (0.2%) is water. Not counting Alaska's boroughs (four of which are also larger), it is the fourth-largest county in area in the United States (behind San Bernardino County, California, Coconino County, Arizona, and Nye County, Nevada). The elevation ranges from about 4,300 feet (1,300 m) at the edge of the salt flats of the Great Salt Lake Desert, to 11,387 feet (3,471 m) on the summit of Ruby Dome in the Ruby Mountains. The most topographically prominent mountain in Elko County is Pilot Peak.

The county has three physiographic sections (70% Great Basin section, 20% Payette, 10% Snake River Plain) and 4 watersheds (45% Humboldt River, 30% Upper Snake River, 20% central Nevada desert, 5% Pilot-Thousand Springs).

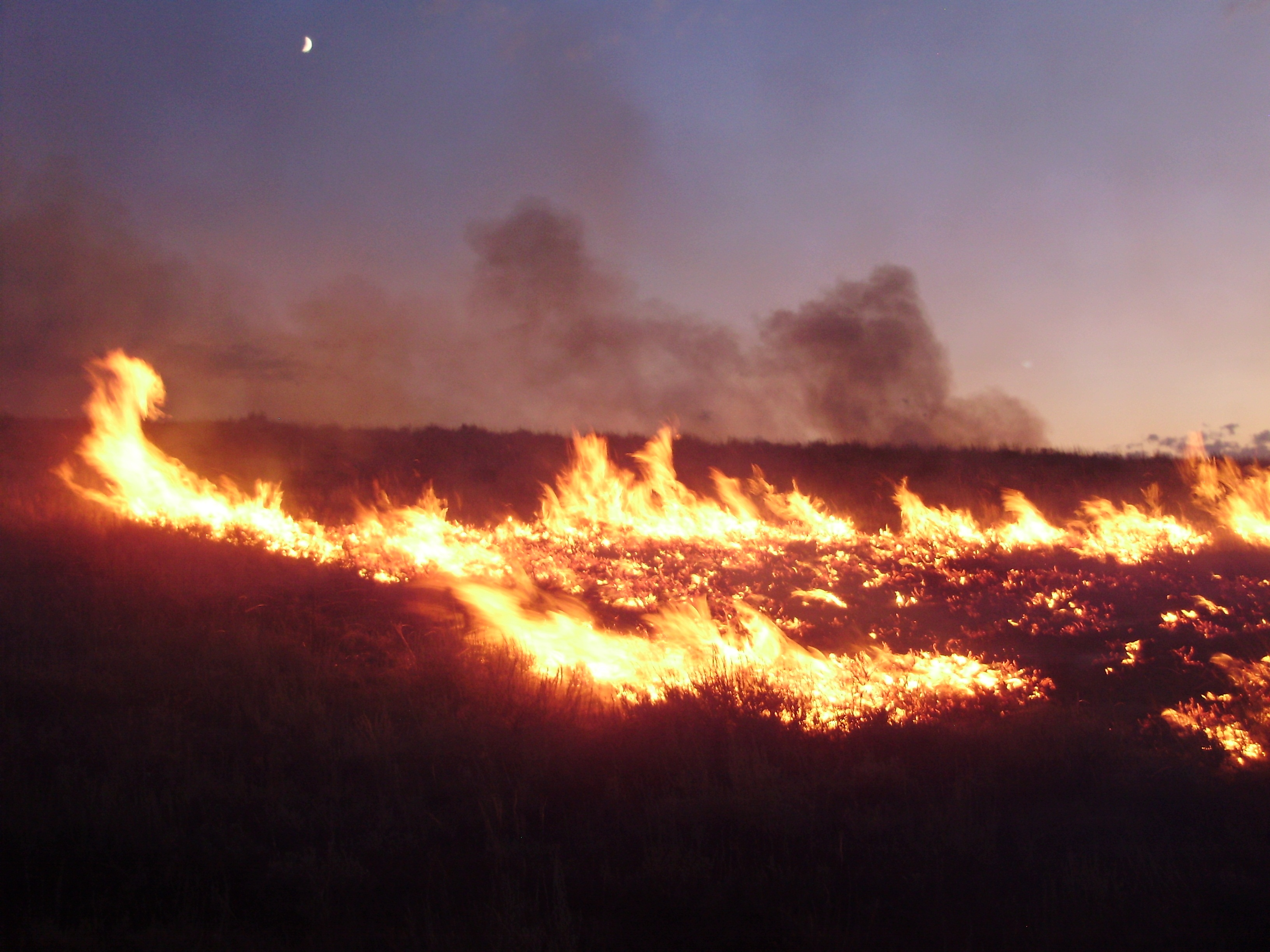
Lightning-sparked wildfires are common occurrences in Elko County.

=== National protected areas ===
- Humboldt-Toiyabe National Forest (part)
- Ruby Lake National Wildlife Refuge (part)

=== Adjacent counties ===
- Owyhee County, Idaho – northwest/Mountain Time Border
- Twin Falls County, Idaho – north/Mountain Time Border
- Cassia County, Idaho – northeast/Mountain Time Border
- Box Elder County, Utah – east/Mountain Time Border
- Tooele County, Utah – southeast/Mountain Time Border
- White Pine County – south
- Eureka County – southwest
- Lander County – southwest
- Humboldt County – west

=== Time zones ===
Except for West Wendover which is in the Mountain Time Zone, the county is in the Pacific Time Zone, though other communities such as Owyhee, Mountain City, Jarbidge and Jackpot unofficially observe Mountain Time as well due to their proximity to, and economic connections with, neighboring areas of Idaho.

== Demographics ==
Historical population
| Census | Pop. | Note | %± |
|---|---|---|---|
| 1870 | 3,447 | | — |
| 1880 | 5,716 | | 65.8% |
| 1890 | 4,794 | | −16.1% |
| 1900 | 5,688 | | 18.6% |
| 1910 | 8,133 | | 43.0% |
| 1920 | 8,083 | | −0.6% |
| 1930 | 9,960 | | 23.2% |
| 1940 | 10,912 | | 9.6% |
| 1950 | 11,654 | | 6.8% |
| 1960 | 12,011 | | 3.1% |
| 1970 | 13,958 | | 16.2% |
| 1980 | 17,269 | | 23.7% |
| 1990 | 33,530 | | 94.2% |
| 2000 | 45,291 | | 35.1% |
| 2010 | 48,818 | | 7.8% |
| 2020 | 53,702 | | 10.0% |
| 2025 (est.) | 54,815 | ▲ | 2.1% |
U.S. Decennial Census; 1790–1960 1900–1990; 1990–2000 2010–2020

=== Racial and ethnic composition ===
Elko County, Nevada – Racial and ethnic composition Note: the US Census treats Hispanic/Latino as an ethnic category. This table excludes Latinos from the racial categories and assigns them to a separate category. Hispanics/Latinos may be of any race.
| Race / Ethnicity (NH = Non-Hispanic) | Pop 1980 | Pop 1990 | Pop 2000 | Pop 2010 | Pop 2020 | % 1980 | % 1990 | % 2000 | % 2010 | % 2020 |
|---|---|---|---|---|---|---|---|---|---|---|
| White alone (NH) | 13,799 | 26,730 | 32,771 | 33,730 | 34,177 | 79.91% | 79.72% | 72.36% | 69.09% | 63.64% |
| Black or African American alone (NH) | 81 | 249 | 257 | 329 | 494 | 0.47% | 0.74% | 0.57% | 0.67% | 0.92% |
| Native American or Alaska Native alone (NH) | 1,468 | 1,919 | 2,150 | 2,286 | 2,378 | 8.50% | 5.72% | 4.75% | 4.68% | 4.43% |
| Asian alone (NH) | 79 | 265 | 298 | 434 | 555 | 0.46% | 0.79% | 0.66% | 0.89% | 1.03% |
| Native Hawaiian or Pacific Islander alone (NH) | x | x | 46 | 62 | 85 | x | x | 0.10% | 0.13% | 0.16% |
| Other race alone (NH) | 0 | 28 | 41 | 32 | 247 | 0.00% | 0.08% | 0.09% | 0.07% | 0.46% |
| Mixed race or Multiracial (NH) | x | x | 793 | 787 | 2,174 | x | x | 1.75% | 1.61% | 4.05% |
| Hispanic or Latino (any race) | 1,842 | 4,339 | 8,935 | 11,158 | 13,592 | 10.67% | 12.94% | 19.73% | 22.86% | 25.31% |
| Total | 17,269 | 33,530 | 45,291 | 48,818 | 53,702 | 100.00% | 100.00% | 100.00% | 100.00% | 100.00% |

=== 2020 census ===
As of the 2020 census, the county had a population of 53,702. The median age was 34.0 years, 28.5% of residents were under the age of 18, and 11.5% were 65 years of age or older. For every 100 females there were 106.2 males and for every 100 females age 18 and over there were 106.6 males; 48.2% of residents lived in urban areas while 51.8% lived in rural areas.

The racial makeup of the county was 69.7% White, 1.0% Black or African American, 5.3% American Indian and Alaska Native, 1.1% Asian, 0.2% Native Hawaiian and Pacific Islander, 11.7% from some other race, and 11.0% from two or more races. Hispanic or Latino residents of any race comprised 25.3% of the population.

There were 19,631 households in the county, of which 38.2% had children under the age of 18 living with them and 19.5% had a female householder with no spouse or partner present. About 24.2% of all households were made up of individuals and 8.2% had someone living alone who was 65 years of age or older.

There were 21,770 housing units, of which 9.8% were vacant. Among occupied housing units, 68.8% were owner-occupied and 31.2% were renter-occupied. The homeowner vacancy rate was 1.6% and the rental vacancy rate was 10.1%.

=== 2010 census ===
As of the 2010 United States census, there were 48,818 people, 17,442 households, and 12,441 families living in the county. The population density was 2.8 inhabitants per square mile (1.1/km^{2}). There were 19,566 housing units at an average density of 1.1 per square mile (0.42/km^{2}). The racial makeup of the county was 79.4% white, 5.3% Native American, 0.9% Asian, 0.8% black or African American, 0.1% Pacific islander, 10.3% from other races, and 3.2% from two or more races. Those of Hispanic or Latino origin made up 22.9% of the population in terms of ancestry.

Of the 17,442 households, 39.8% had children under the age of 18 living with them, 55.7% were married couples living together, 9.1% had a female householder with no husband present, 28.7% were non-families, and 22.5% of all households were made up of individuals. The average household size was 2.77 and the average family size was 3.26. The median age was 33.4 years.

The median income for a household in the county was $67,038 and the median income for a family was $75,171. Males had a median income of $56,528 versus $34,464 for females. The per capita income for the county was $26,879. About 5.8% of families and 7.1% of the population were below the poverty line, including 8.0% of those under age 18 and 9.0% of those age 65 or over.

=== 2000 census ===
As of the census of 2000, there were 45,291 people, 15,638 households, and 11,493 families living in the county. The population density was 3 people per square mile (1.2 people/km^{2}). There were 18,456 housing units at an average density of 1 units per square mile (0.39/km^{2}). The racial makeup of the county was 82.04% White, 0.59% Black or African American, 5.30% Native American, 0.68% Asian, 0.11% Pacific Islander, 8.50% from other races, and 2.78% from two or more races. 19.73% of the population were Hispanic or Latino of any race.

There were 15,638 households, out of which 43.00% had children under the age of 18 living with them, 59.30% were married couples living together, 8.40% had a female householder with no husband present, and 26.50% were non-families. 20.90% of all households were made up of individuals, and 4.80% had someone living alone who was 65 years of age or older. The average household size was 2.85 and the average family size was 3.33.

In the county, the population was spread out, with 32.50% under the age of 18, 8.80% from 18 to 24, 31.50% from 25 to 44, 21.30% from 45 to 64, and 5.90% who were 65 years of age or older. The median age was 31 years. For every 100 females, there were 108.80 males. For every 100 females age 18 and over, there were 109.40 males.

The median income for a household in the county was $48,383, and the median income for a family was $52,206. Males had a median income of $41,322 versus $24,653 for females. The per capita income for the county was $18,482. About 7.00% of families and 8.90% of the population were below the poverty line, including 9.50% of those under age 18 and 7.60% of those age 65 or over.

== Government and politics ==
United States presidential election results for Elko County, Nevada
| Year | Republican | | Democratic | | Third party(ies) | |
| Year | No. | % | No. | % | No. | % |
|---|---|---|---|---|---|---|
| 1872 | 611 | 52.27% | 0 | 0.00% | 558 | 47.73% |
| 1876 | 820 | 51.80% | 763 | 48.20% | 0 | 0.00% |
| 1880 | 782 | 46.91% | 885 | 53.09% | 0 | 0.00% |
| 1884 | 692 | 52.99% | 614 | 47.01% | 0 | 0.00% |
| 1888 | 793 | 53.08% | 695 | 46.52% | 6 | 0.40% |
| 1892 | 218 | 18.71% | 49 | 4.21% | 898 | 77.08% |
| 1896 | 127 | 11.16% | 1,011 | 88.84% | 0 | 0.00% |
| 1900 | 476 | 35.63% | 860 | 64.37% | 0 | 0.00% |
| 1904 | 718 | 54.07% | 508 | 38.25% | 102 | 7.68% |
| 1908 | 737 | 44.45% | 804 | 48.49% | 117 | 7.06% |
| 1912 | 398 | 19.82% | 843 | 41.98% | 767 | 38.20% |
| 1916 | 1,072 | 32.01% | 2,020 | 60.32% | 257 | 7.67% |
| 1920 | 1,369 | 54.30% | 1,029 | 40.82% | 123 | 4.88% |
| 1924 | 1,113 | 38.81% | 604 | 21.06% | 1,151 | 40.13% |
| 1928 | 1,876 | 56.54% | 1,442 | 43.46% | 0 | 0.00% |
| 1932 | 1,325 | 34.09% | 2,562 | 65.91% | 0 | 0.00% |
| 1936 | 1,065 | 26.94% | 2,888 | 73.06% | 0 | 0.00% |
| 1940 | 1,783 | 37.15% | 3,016 | 62.85% | 0 | 0.00% |
| 1944 | 1,642 | 41.87% | 2,280 | 58.13% | 0 | 0.00% |
| 1948 | 1,683 | 44.63% | 2,026 | 53.73% | 62 | 1.64% |
| 1952 | 3,104 | 63.88% | 1,755 | 36.12% | 0 | 0.00% |
| 1956 | 2,981 | 63.20% | 1,736 | 36.80% | 0 | 0.00% |
| 1960 | 2,427 | 49.31% | 2,495 | 50.69% | 0 | 0.00% |
| 1964 | 1,856 | 39.99% | 2,785 | 60.01% | 0 | 0.00% |
| 1968 | 2,687 | 54.48% | 1,686 | 34.18% | 559 | 11.33% |
| 1972 | 3,886 | 72.59% | 1,467 | 27.41% | 0 | 0.00% |
| 1976 | 3,293 | 60.32% | 1,955 | 35.81% | 211 | 3.87% |
| 1980 | 4,393 | 70.89% | 1,296 | 20.91% | 508 | 8.20% |
| 1984 | 5,110 | 74.48% | 1,566 | 22.82% | 185 | 2.70% |
| 1988 | 5,722 | 68.35% | 2,310 | 27.59% | 340 | 4.06% |
| 1992 | 5,208 | 43.67% | 2,782 | 23.33% | 3,936 | 33.00% |
| 1996 | 6,512 | 54.92% | 3,149 | 26.56% | 2,196 | 18.52% |
| 2000 | 11,025 | 77.75% | 2,542 | 17.93% | 613 | 4.32% |
| 2004 | 11,938 | 77.98% | 3,050 | 19.92% | 321 | 2.10% |
| 2008 | 10,969 | 68.47% | 4,541 | 28.35% | 509 | 3.18% |
| 2012 | 12,014 | 75.15% | 3,511 | 21.96% | 461 | 2.88% |
| 2016 | 13,551 | 73.02% | 3,401 | 18.33% | 1,607 | 8.66% |
| 2020 | 16,741 | 76.21% | 4,557 | 20.74% | 669 | 3.05% |
| 2024 | 17,352 | 77.24% | 4,632 | 20.62% | 481 | 2.14% |

United States Senate election results for Elko County, Nevada1
| Year | Republican | | Democratic | | Third party(ies) | |
| Year | No. | % | No. | % | No. | % |
|---|---|---|---|---|---|---|
| 2024 | 15,850 | 71.25% | 4,439 | 19.96% | 1,956 | 8.79% |

Elko is a highly conservative area. In 2011, all eleven of the partisan county officials were Republican. In every election of the 21st Century (except for 2008), the Republican candidate has received over 70% of the vote in the county. The city of Elko itself voted over 65% Republican on average in 2024, while most of the rural county voted over 80% Republican, with other cities and towns somewhere in between. The city of West Wendover was, in 2024, the only one in the county to have a slight Democratic leaning (specifically in its southern district). The Owyhee Reservation along the county's northern border is also heavily Democratic. However, these places have little effect on the overall red leaning of the county due to their relatively small populations.

Both former President Jimmy Carter and then-President George W. Bush made visits to the city of Elko during the 2006 mid-term election. William McKinley visited in 1901; Herbert Hoover made his final campaign broadcast as president from a railroad car in Elko in 1932; Franklin D. Roosevelt spoke in Carlin in 1938 during his whistle stop tour; and Barack Obama visited while campaigning in 2008. President Donald Trump arrived in Elko on October 20, 2018, to campaign for Senator Dean Heller during the 2018 midterm elections. In addition, many other high-profile political figures have come to Elko, including former Vice President Dick Cheney. In 2016 Donald Trump Jr. campaigned in Elko during the primary campaign.

== Transportation ==
A number of highways maintained by the Nevada Department of Transportation, some national in prominence, cross Elko County. The county also maintains a network of county routes; however, many of them are unpaved and receive limited, if any, winter maintenance.

Transportation by means other than road vehicle is limited within Elko County. Commercial air service is available only at the Elko Regional Airport in Elko; the only destination currently served is Salt Lake City International Airport. Other public airports in Elko County include Jackpot Airport, Owyhee Airport and Wells Municipal Airport.

Amtrak passenger service is available from the unstaffed Elko station. Service is via the California Zephyr and is either eastbound or westbound, once a day.

=== Major highways ===
- Interstate 80
- Interstate 80 Business (Carlin)
- Interstate 80 Business (Elko)
- Interstate 80 Business (Wells)
- Interstate 80 Business (West Wendover, Nevada–Wendover, Utah)
- U.S. Route 93
- U.S. Route 93 Alternate
- State Route 221
- State Route 223
- State Route 225
- State Route 226
- State Route 227
- State Route 228
- State Route 229
- State Route 230
- State Route 231
- State Route 232
- State Route 233
- State Route 278
- State Route 535
- State Route 766
- State Route 767

== Communities ==
=== Cities ===
- Carlin
- Elko (county seat)
- Wells
- West Wendover

=== Census-designated places ===
- Jackpot
- Lamoille
- Montello
- Mountain City
- Oasis
- Osino
- Owyhee
- Spring Creek

=== Unincorporated communities ===
- Contact
- Currie
- Deeth
- Halleck
- Jack Creek
- Jarbidge
- Jiggs
- Lee
- Midas
- North Fork
- Pleasant Valley
- Ryndon
- Shantytown
- South Fork
- Tuscarora
- Twin Bridges
- Welcome
- Wild Horse

=== Ghost towns ===
- Arthur
- Bullion
- Cobre
- Dinner Station
- Hunter
- Huntington
- Metropolis
- Patsville
- Pequop
- San Jacinto
- Shafter

== Education ==
Its school district is the Elko County School District.

== See also ==
- National Register of Historic Places listings in Elko County, Nevada
- Boone Springs Fire
