= South Fork, Nevada =

Unincorporated community in Nevada, US

South Fork
- Ghost town
- Location in Nevada Location in the United States
- Coordinates: 40°38′25″N 115°43′33″W
- Country: United States
- State: Nevada
- County: Elko

South Fork is an unincorporated community semi-ghost town in Elko County, Nevada in the United States.

== History ==
This region was settled by white men in 1867. South Fork was a stagecoach stop and there was a big hotel which closed in 1871. In 1874, the post office was reopened and closed in 1877. The area is now known as Shepherd's Station, a recreation park that offers fishing, hunting and camping.
