= Shantytown, Nevada =

Unincorporated community in Nevada, US

Shanty Town, Nevada
- Unincorporated community
- Location in the state of Nevada
- Coordinates: 40°09′43″N 115°30′10″W
- Country: United States
- State: Nevada
- County: Elko
- Elevation: 6,030 ft (1,840 m)
- Time zone: UTC-8 (PST)
  - Summer (DST): UTC-7 (PDT)
- GNIS feature ID: 861335

Shanty Town is an unincorporated community in Elko County, Nevada, United States.

== History ==
According to Edna B. Patterson's 1912 book Nevada's Northeastern Frontier the area was known as "Robber's Roost" due to it being used as a hiding place for criminals.

The Shanty Town settlement, located on the western edge of the Ruby marshes at the base of Sherman mountain, came into existence after the second world war as a camp for hunting and fishing, with fish in the area being particularly abundant. Veterans made use of the US Small Tract Act of 1939 to rent tracts of land within the area for use as hunting and fishing lodges. According to the records of the Bureau of Land Management (BLM), by July 1964 43 veterans had made use of the Small Tract Act to rent land in the area. In 1967-68 tracts of land at the site were sold by the BLM via auction.

A drought in 1985 greatly reduced the abundance of fish at the site. The drought reduced the number of anglers visiting the marsh within which the settlement is located from 78,580 in 1986 to 10,182 in 1992. Catches also fell dramatically, with bass caught falling from 300,223 in 1986 to 8,782 in 1990. As of 1993 Shanty Town consisted of a number of trailers and log cabins, with the only business in the settlement being a single grocery store, and had a permanent population of fewer than 10 people.

Shanty Town experienced a 8,500 acre fire in 1979. In 2002 the Elko-based Student Conservation Association Fire Education Corps carried out a clean-up in the area to reduced the amount of potential fuel for fires around the 53 properties at the location at that time. At that point Shanty Town had 15 permanent residents.
