= Nevada State Route 11 =

Former designation of multiple highways in Nevada

State Route 11 was the previous designation for the following routes in Nevada:

- State Route 225
- State Route 226
- State Route 229
