= Owyhee, Nevada =

Owyhee Un Kwahain
- Census-designated place
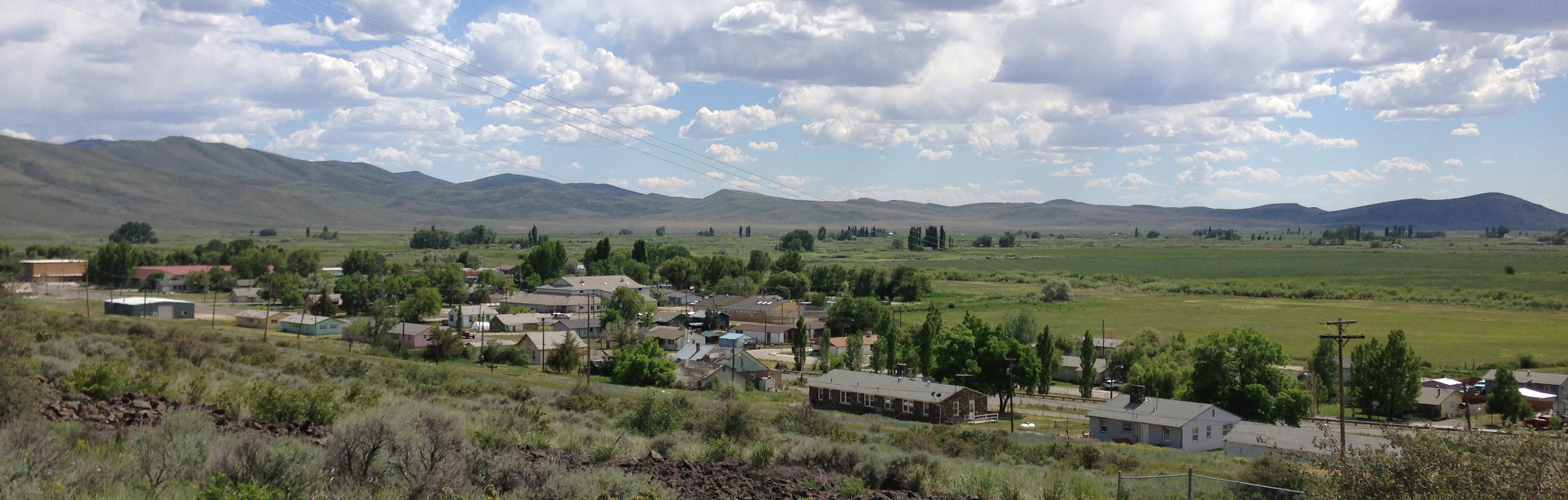
- Central Owyhee, 2013

- Location of Owyhee, Nevada
- Coordinates: 41°54′50″N 116°08′10″W
- Country: United States
- State: Nevada

Area
  - Total: 224.99 sq mi (582.72 km^{2})
  - Land: 224.39 sq mi (581.16 km^{2})
  - Water: 0.60 sq mi (1.56 km^{2})
- Elevation: 5,391 ft (1,643 m)

Population (2020)
  - Total: 1,027
  - Density: 4.6/sq mi (1.77/km^{2})
- Time zone: UTC−07:00 (Mountain (MST))
  - Summer (DST): UTC−06:00 (MDT)
- ZIP Code: 89832
- Area code: 775
- FIPS code: 32-53600
- GNIS feature ID: 2409008

Owyhee (/oʊˈwaɪhiː/, Shoshoni: Un Kwahain) is a census-designated place (CDP) in Elko County, Nevada, United States, along the banks of the Owyhee River. As of the 2020 census, Owyhee had a population of 1,027. It is part of the Elko Micropolitan Statistical Area. It is the primary town of the federally recognized Shoshone-Paiute tribe's Duck Valley Indian Reservation, which covers portions of northern Nevada and southern Idaho, and the majority of its population is Native American.

Owyhee, along with the rest of Nevada except for the city of West Wendover, is legally in the Pacific Time Zone. But, along with other Idaho border towns such as Jackpot, Mountain City and Jarbidge, it unofficially observes the Mountain Time Zone as it has closer proximity to and greater connections with towns in southern Idaho.

== History ==
The Tribes once freely occupied the land in the tri-state area of what is now Idaho, Nevada, and Oregon. This changed with the coming of migrants from the eastern United States and Europe, especially after the mid-19th century. Land and resources were wrested away from the Shoshone and Paiute. The tribes made treaties with the United States, of which some were ratified by the Senate and others not. The chiefs signed all the treaties in good faith and for the survival of their peoples.

Descendants of the Western Shoshone and the Northern Paiute occupy the Duck Valley Indian Reservation of Idaho and Nevada. Various bands of the two closely related tribes have jointly used the area for seasonal hunting and gathering from time immemorial.

On April 16, 1877, United States President Rutherford B. Hayes established the reservation for the Western Shoshone. In the early days of the Duck Valley reservation, the people built and lived in their traditional earthen, willow and sagebrush huts. Bands of Western Shoshone occupied and revolved on and off the reservation, depending on their survival needs and because of the unfulfilled promises of food and supplies from the federal government. Some bands adapted as best they could.

Others did not want to leave their homelands and campsites which were located off the reservation. The Northern Paiute bands became allied with their kin, the Bannock, in the Bannock War of 1878. After their defeat by the United States, survivors were relocated as prisoners to an Indian reservation in Yakima, Washington. Upon their release, the survivors were returned to their homelands, and the Western Shoshone reservation was expanded for their use in 1886.

In 1884, local settlers tried to get the Western Shoshone removed to the Fort Hall Reservation in Idaho, in order to open up Duck Valley lands for non-Indian homesteads, but the chiefs successfully resisted this effort. The tribal bands located at Duck Valley were supervised by the Indian Agent and later Indian Police. Farming and ranching became the mainstay for the people.

From 1884 through 1911, an Indian boarding school operated on the reservation. Thereafter three day schools were operated in three separate locations on the reservation. In Owyhee, the Swayne School was built.

In 1931, during the Great Depression, the day schools were closed, and all students were sent to the Swayne School. Students of the higher grades were sent off reservation to boarding schools until 1946, That year high school classes were finally added to the reservation school. In 1956 the reservation school system was consolidated into the Elko County School District of Nevada and today is known as the Owyhee Combined Schools (K-12). Recently, a community education center was placed in Owyhee for GED and higher education courses.

The first full-time physician was assigned to Duck Valley in 1882. By 1897 a small one-room infirmary hospital was built. It was replaced by 1920 with a structure which had two seven-bed wards.

The Shoshone and Paiute united at Duck Valley under the Indian Reorganization Act of 1934 and formed a tribal government through adopting a constitution and bylaws for elected government in 1936. In July 1937 the native stone hospital was completed with a 20-bed ward, X-ray and laboratory facilities. The native stone hospital was closed in 1976 when the modern Owyhee Community Health Facility was completed.

== Government ==
The Shoshone-Paiute Tribes of Duck Valley are governed by the Business Council. The Business Council is composed of a chairman, vice-chairman and five council members, all of whom are elected to serve three-year terms. The Business Council directs the tribal government. The chairman manages the operations of tribal government. There are four divisions of tribal administration: Health & Human Services, Judicial Services, Tribal Programs and Support Services.

Farming and ranching are still mainstays for Duck Valley and is reflected in the 12,000 acres (4,900 ha) of lands. The Duck Valley Reservation is composed of 289,819 acres (117,286 ha) held in trust by the United States government for the use and occupancy of the Shoshone-Paiute tribes. Included in the total acreage of the reservation are 22,231 acres (8,997 ha) of wetlands. Wild Horse Reservoir was constructed in 1936 for the Duck Valley Irrigation Project.

Tribal membership is more than 2,000, with approximately 1,700 living on the reservation. The Shoshone-Paiute Tribes of Duck Valley continue to live within the historic territories of their ancestors.

== Geography and climate ==
Owyhee is located along the northern border of Nevada. According to the United States Census Bureau, the CDP has a total area of 225.9 square miles (585.1 km^{2}), of which 225.3 square miles (583.5 km^{2}) is land and 0.62 square miles (1.6 km^{2}), or (0.27%, is water.

Nevada State Route 225 leads south from Owyhee 97 miles (156 km) to Elko, the county seat. Mountain Home, Idaho, is 96 miles (154 km) to the north via Idaho State Highway 51.

Climate data for Owyhee, Nevada (1948-1985)
Month	Jan	Feb	Mar	Apr	May	Jun	Jul	Aug	Sep	Oct	Nov	Dec	Year
Record high °F (°C)	62 (17)	66 (19)	74 (23)	83 (28)	90 (32)	95 (35)	98 (37)	98 (37)	96 (36)	84 (29)	74 (23)	65 (18)	98 (37)
Mean daily maximum °F (°C)	36.8 (2.7)	41.5 (5.3)	45.3 (7.4)	54.3 (12.4)	63.9 (17.7)	73.6 (23.1)	85.0 (29.4)	82.8 (28.2)	74.3 (23.5)	62.6 (17.0)	48.1 (8.9)	39.9 (4.4)	59.0 (15.0)
Mean daily minimum °F (°C)	16.6 (−8.6)	21.5 (−5.8)	24.0 (−4.4)	30.0 (−1.1)	37.6 (3.1)	44.1 (6.7)	51.1 (10.6)	49.6 (9.8)	40.7 (4.8)	32.0 (0.0)	25.4 (−3.7)	19.3 (−7.1)	32.7 (0.4)
Record low °F (°C)	−34 (−37)	−25 (−32)	−11 (−24)	11 (−12)	14 (−10)	24 (−4)	32 (0)	28 (−2)	11 (−12)	13 (−11)	−8 (−22)	−22 (−30)	−34 (−37)
Average precipitation inches (mm)	1.32 (34)	1.10 (28)	1.52 (39)	1.45 (37)	1.88 (48)	1.69 (43)	0.44 (11)	0.55 (14)	0.71 (18)	1.08 (27)	1.28 (33)	1.59 (40)	14.61 (372)
Average snowfall inches (cm)	11.7 (30)	10.3 (26)	12.5 (32)	8.3 (21)	2.3 (5.8)	0 (0)	0 (0)	0 (0)	0.1 (0.25)	3.8 (9.7)	7.3 (19)	12.7 (32)	69 (175.75)

== Demographics ==
Historical population
Census	Pop.	Note	%±
1990	908		—
2000	1,017		12.0%
2010	953		−6.3%
2020	1,027		7.8%
U.S. Decennial Census

As of the census of 2000, there were 1,017 people, 323 households, and 215 families residing in the CDP. The population density was 4.5 people per square mile (1.7 people/km^{2}). There were 371 housing units at an average density of 1.7 units per square mile (0.66 units/km^{2}). The racial makeup of the CDP was 17.80% White, 3.54% African American, 75.02% Native American, 0.59% Asian, 0.10% Pacific Islander, 0.88% from other races, and 2.06% from two or more races. Hispanic or Latino of any race were 9.05% of the population.

There were 323 households, out of which 35.3% had children under the age of 18 living with them, 33.7% were married couples living together, 22.6% had a female householder with no husband present, and 33.4% were non-families. 30.3% of all households were made up of individuals, and 6.5% had someone living alone who was 65 years of age or older. The average household size was 2.65 and the average family size was 3.31.

In the CDP, the population was spread out, with 40.5% under the age of 18, 9.4% from 18 to 24, 22.8% from 25 to 44, 19.6% from 45 to 64, and 7.7% who were 65 years of age or older. The median age was 25 years. For every 100 females, there were 138.7 males. For every 100 females age 18 and over, there were 105.8 males.

The median income for a household in the CDP was $23,214, and the median income for a family was $28,846. Males had a median income of $31,250 versus $27,917 for females. The per capita income for the CDP was $9,869. About 27.7% of families and 32.4% of the population were below the poverty line, including 41.0% of those under age 18 and 34.5% of those age 65 or over.

== Transportation ==
The primary transportation route into and out of Owyhee is Nevada State Route 225, which runs south to Elko and north to the Idaho border. After crossing the border, it becomes Idaho State Highway 51, which continues north to Mountain Home. Owyhee Airport is also located in Owyhee.

== Education ==
- The Owyhee Combined School lies in the Elko County School District and serves the area from grades K-12.
- The Owyhee High School sports groups are based in the NIAA 1A East Region and play other schools such as Wells, Jackpot, McDermitt, Lund, Eureka, and Carlin. The Owyhee Wrestling team is centered in the 2A north region. As of 2025, Owyhee High School holds 11 state championships. 1 in Football, 2 in Boys Basketball, 5 in Girls Basketball, and 3 in Volleyball.

The Owyhee Football, Volleyball and Basketball teams often hold non-league games/ scrimmages against Rimrock Jr-Sr High School, located 7 miles out of Grandview, Idaho. The Owyhee Boys Basketball team often schedules games against the Nevada Youth Training Center (NYTC) or Independence, who play in their league but are not allowed to join the state tournament.

A new site was made in mid-February 2024, to replace the old facility that was built in 1954. A betting was put on the building and in January 2025 the funding was paid for by a Utah construction company. Building was set for begin in April 2025 and end somewhere between spring or summer of 2027.
