= North Fork, Nevada =

Unincorporated community in Elko County, Nevada, United States

- Unincorported community
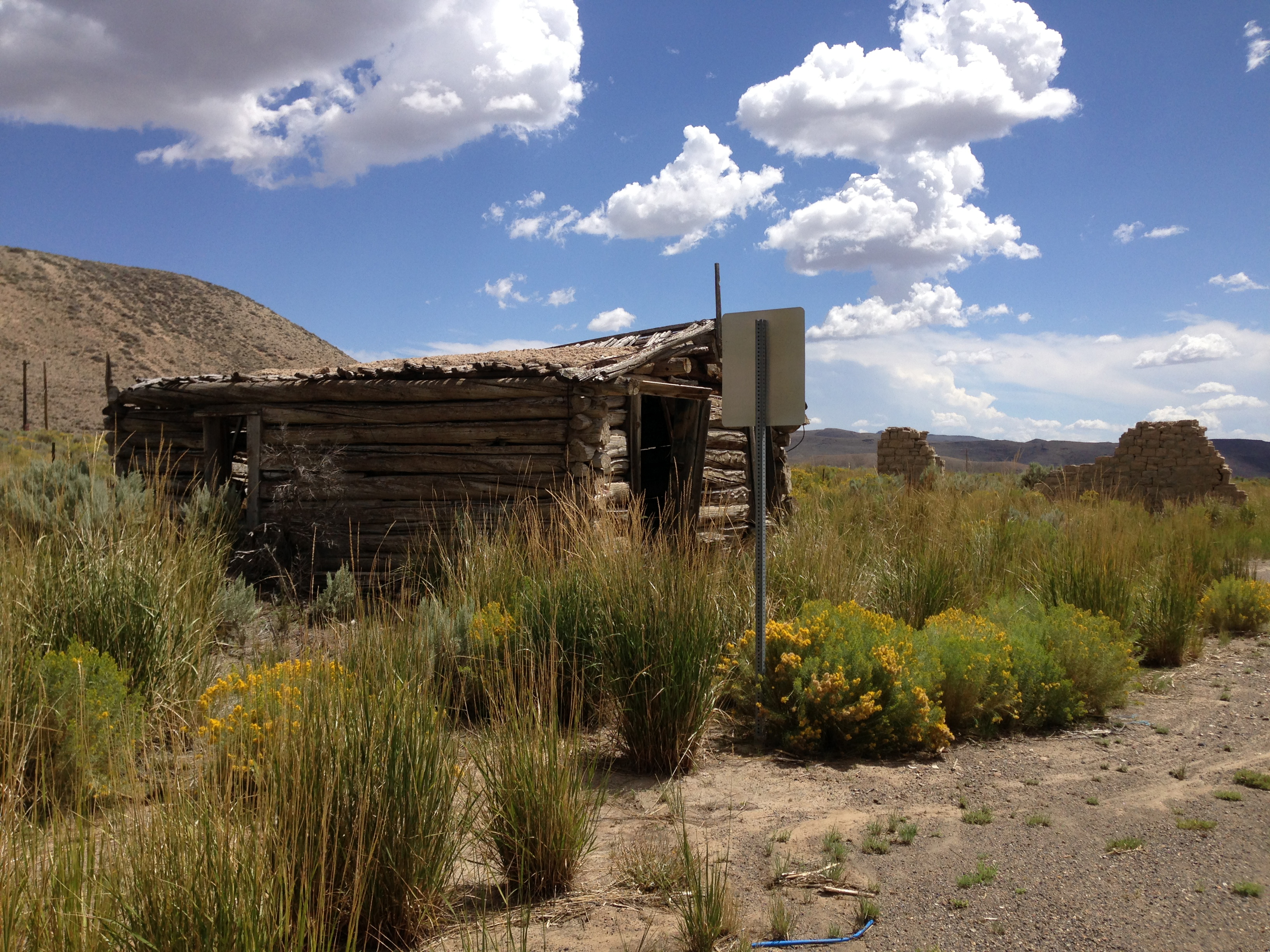
- Abandoned building in North Fork, August 2014

- Location within the state of Nevada
- Coordinates: 41°28′57″N 115°49′00″W
- Country: United States
- State: Nevada
- County: Elko
- Elevation: 6,126 ft (1,867 m)
- Time zone: UTC-8 (Pacific (PST))
  - Summer (DST): UTC-7 (PDT)
- GNIS feature ID: 845588

North Fork is an unincorported community in Elko County, Nevada, United States.

== Description ==
The community is located along the North Fork Humboldt River, The mouth of Fourmile Creek is on the same river in the northern part of the community.The ZIP Code of North Fork, Nevada is 89801. Due to its small size, some writers classify North Fork as a ghost town.

A variant name is "Northfork". The community takes its name from the North Fork Humboldt River.

== History ==
A post office was established at North Fork in 1889, and remained in operation until 1944. A variant name is "Northfork". The community takes its name from the North Fork Humboldt River.

== See also ==
- List of ghost towns in Nevada
