= Nevada State Route 225 =

State highway in Nevada, United States

State Route 225
- Mountain City Highway
- Nevada State Route 225, highlighted in red

Route information
- Maintained by NDOT
- Length: 100.301 mi (161.419 km)
- Existed: 1976–present

Major junctions
- South end: I-80 BL / SR 535 in Elko
- I-80 in Elko
- North end: SH-51 at the Idaho state line in Owyhee

Location
- Country: United States
- State: Nevada

Highway system
- Nevada State Highway System; Interstate; US; State; Pre‑1976; Scenic
← SR 224	→ SR 226

State Route 225 (SR 225) is a state highway in Elko County, Nevada, United States. Known as the Mountain City Highway, it connects the city of Elko to the town of Owyhee near the southwestern Idaho border via Mountain City. The route provides connections to Mountain Home, Idaho and Interstate 84 via Idaho State Highway 51.

== Route description ==
SR 225 begins at the intersection of SR 535/Interstate 80 Business Loop (Idaho Street) and Silver Street just west of downtown Elko. From there it heads northwesterly along the east side of Elko Regional Airport and then has a junction with Interstate 80. The road continues northwest, winding its way up a narrow valley on its way to Adobe Summit in the Adobe Range. From there, it heads generally north, passing the small ghost town of Dinner Station before intersecting Deep Creek Highway (SR 226) at Tuscarora Junction. It then continues generally north, passing North Fork and intersecting various county routes before reaching Wild Horse on the south shore of Wild Horse Reservoir. The road winds its way along the east and north shores of the reservoir before entering the narrow and windy canyon of the Owyhee River. After the canyon widens into a somewhat broader valley, SR 225 passes through Mountain City. Continuing northwest, the valley becomes much wider just before the road enters Owyhee. A few miles north of Owyhee, the road crosses into Idaho and becomes SH-51.

== History ==
SR 225 previously existed as portions of several pre-1976 routes, including State Route 11, State Route 43 and State Route 51.

== Major intersections ==
The entire route is in Elko County.

Location	mi	km	Destinations	Notes
Elko			I-80 BL / SR 535 (Idaho Street)	
Elko			I-80 – Reno, Salt Lake City	
			SR 226 – Deep Creek	
Owyhee			SH-51 – Mountain Home	Continuation beyond Idaho state line
1.000 mi = 1.609 km; 1.000 km = 0.621 mi

== Gallery ==
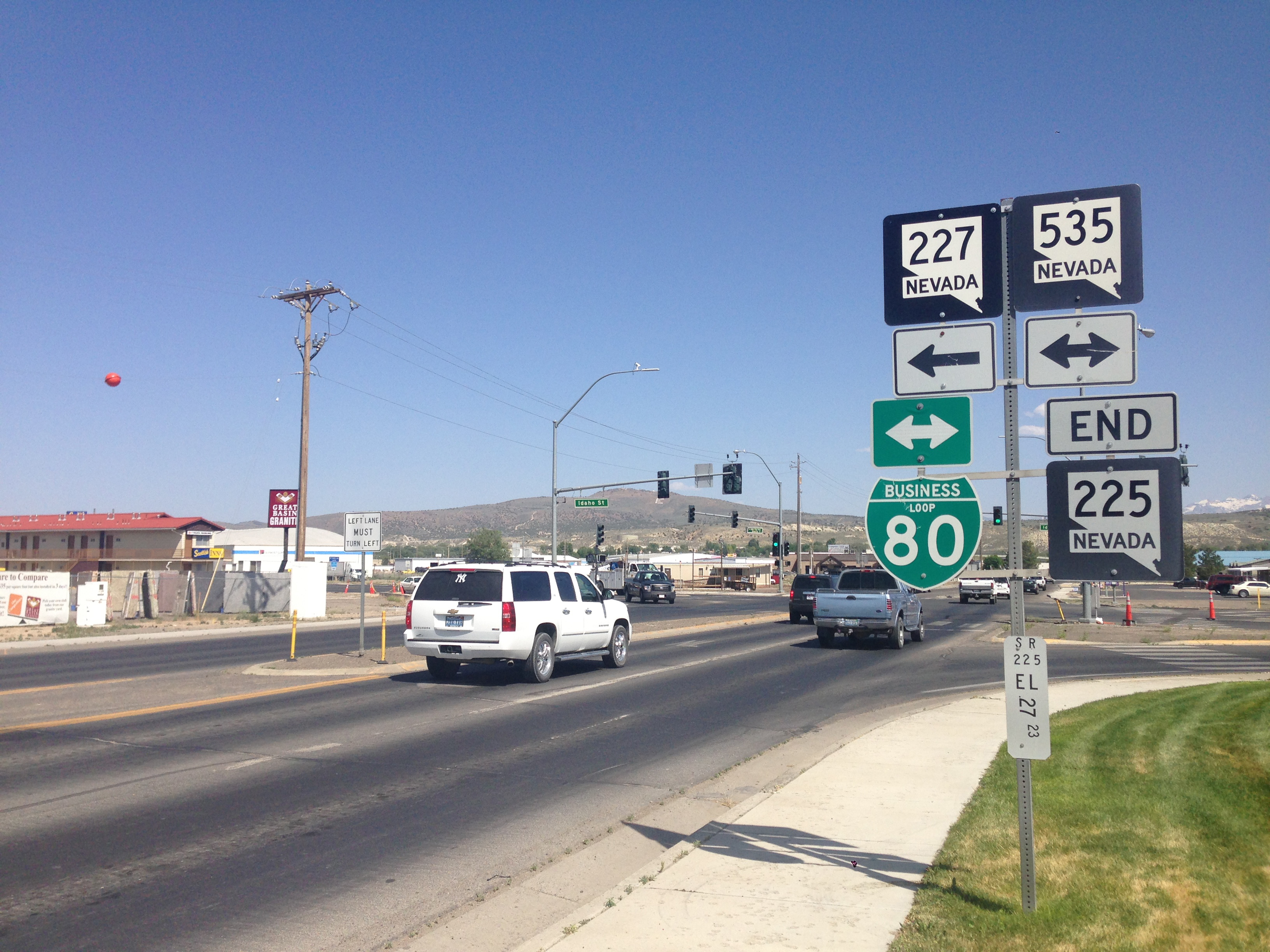
Southern terminus in Elko

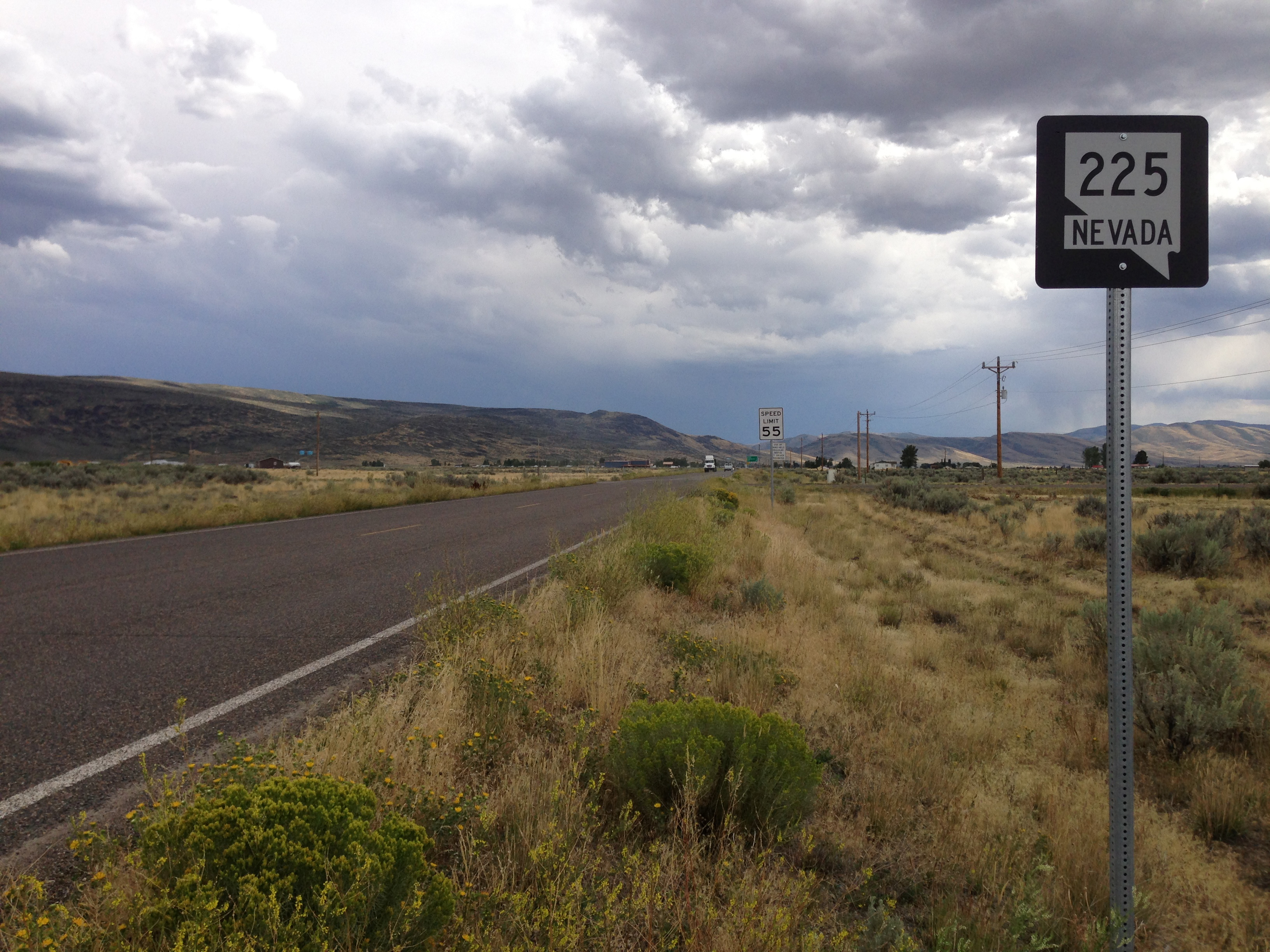
First reassurance sign along southbound SR 225 in Owyhee

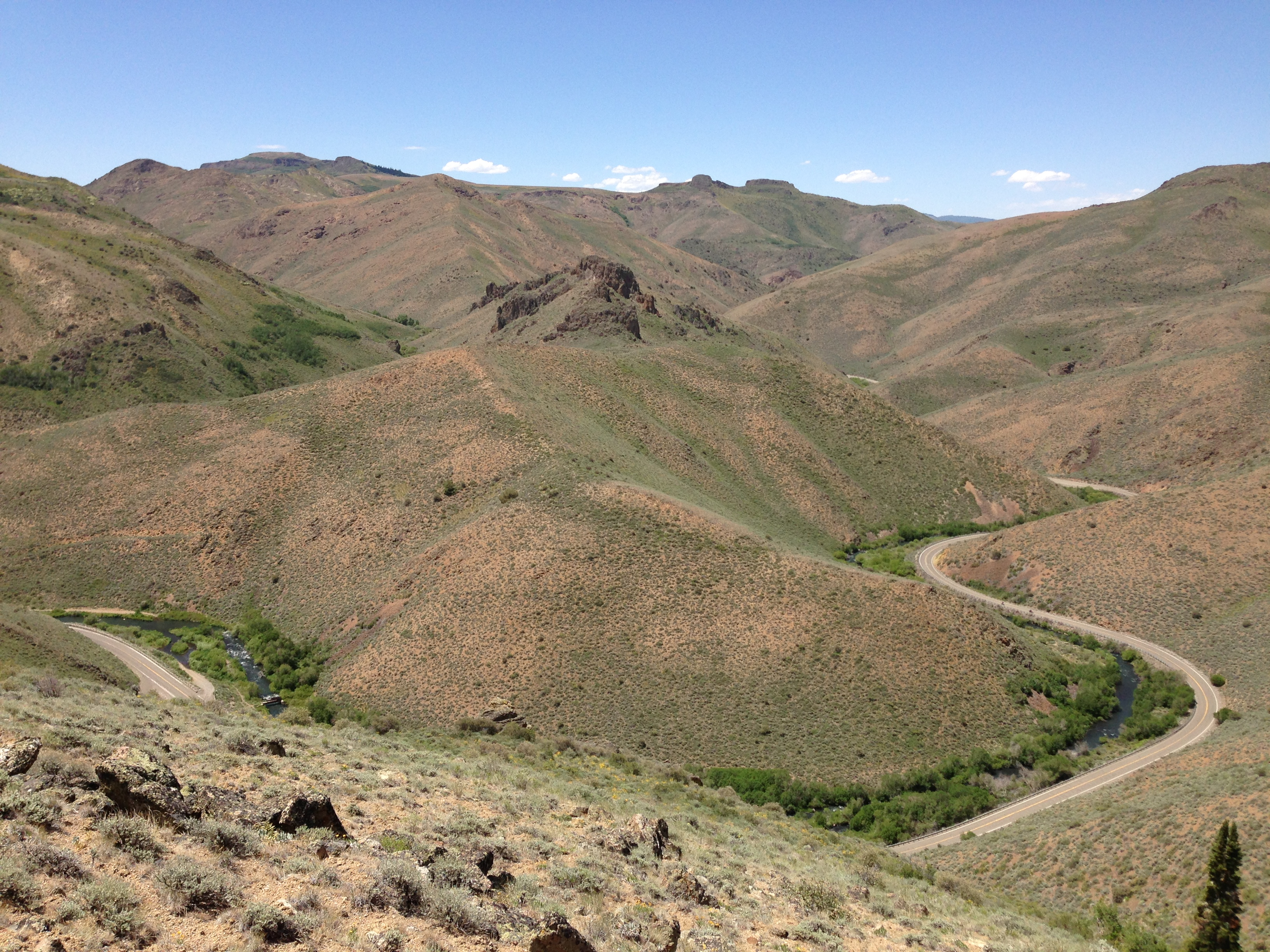
SR 225 through Owyhee Canyon

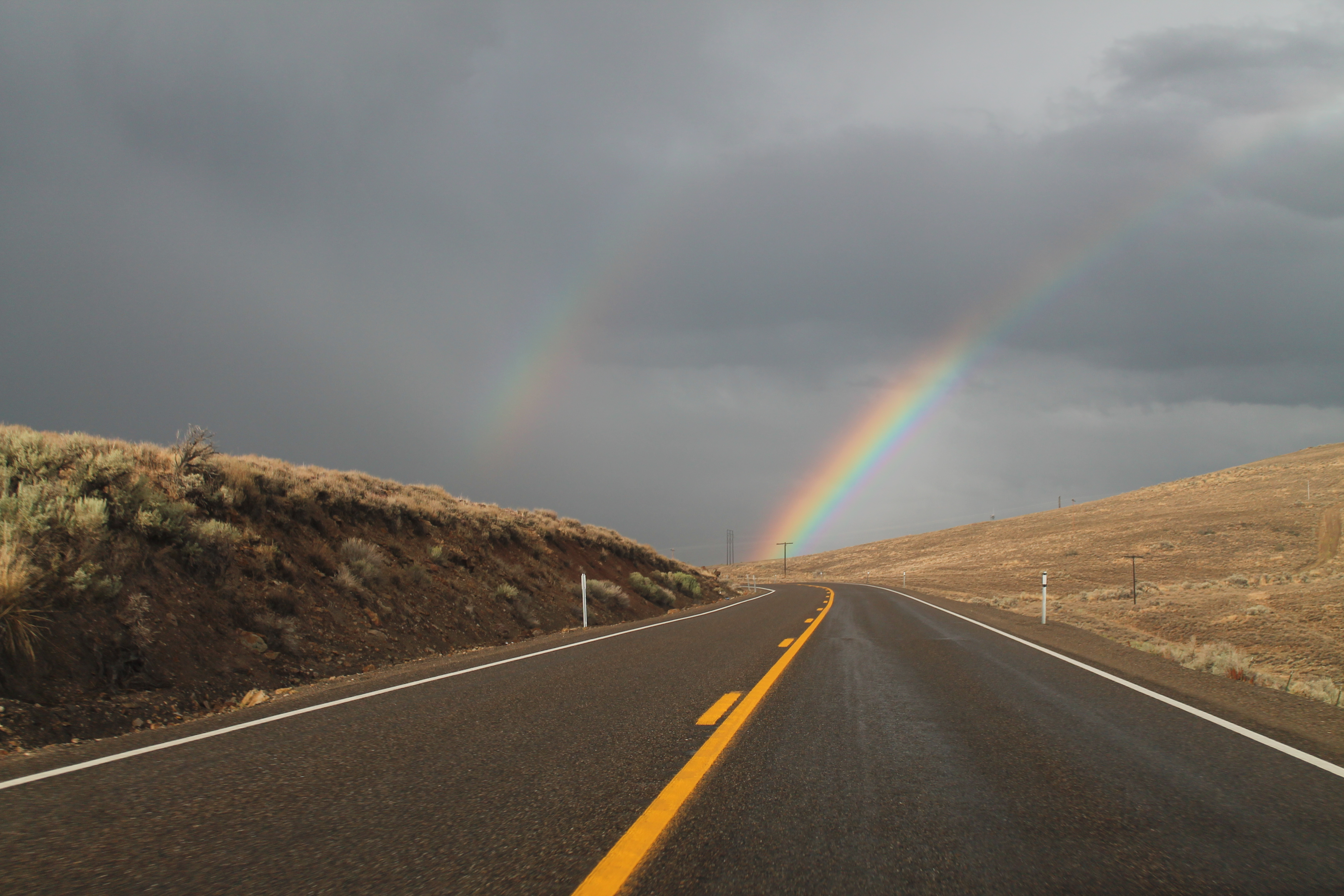
SR 225 northbound near Adobe Summit
