= Bevent, Wisconsin =

Town of Bevent, Wisconsin
- Town
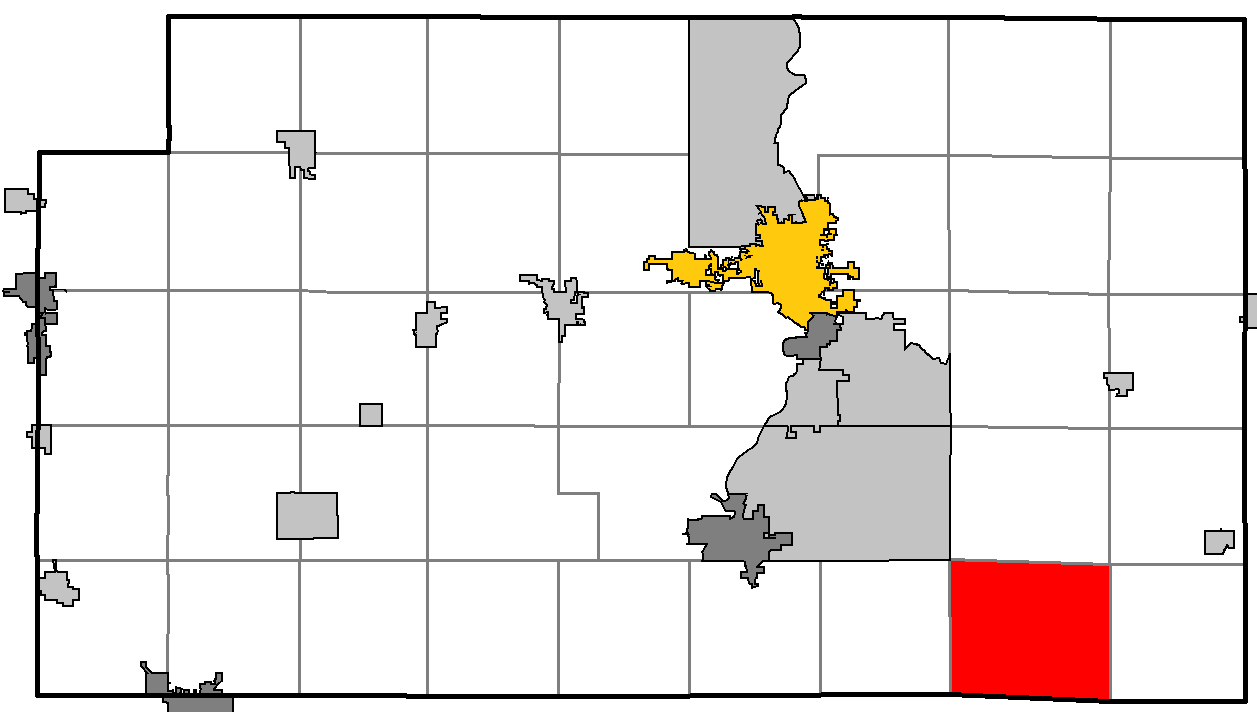
- Location of Bevent, Marathon County

- Location of Marathon County, Wisconsin
- Coordinates: 44°44′21″N 89°24′57″W
- Country: United States
- State: Wisconsin
- County: Marathon

Area
  - Total: 42.7 sq mi (110.7 km^{2})
  - Land: 42.1 sq mi (109.1 km^{2})
  - Water: 0.62 sq mi (1.6 km^{2})
- Elevation: 1,175 ft (358 m)

Population (2020)
  - Total: 1,049
  - Density: 24.90/sq mi (9.615/km^{2})
- Time zone: UTC-6 (Central (CST))
  - Summer (DST): UTC-5 (CDT)
- Area codes: 715 & 534
- FIPS code: 55-07125
- GNIS feature ID: 1582804
- Website: https://townofbevent.com/

Bevent is a town in Marathon County, Wisconsin, United States. It is part of the Wausau, Wisconsin Metropolitan Statistical Area. The population was 1,049 at the 2020 census. The unincorporated community of Shantytown is located in the town. The unincorporated community of Bevent is also located partially in the town.

== History ==
The Town of Pike Lake was divided into the towns of Reid and Bevent. Bevent was actually supposed to be "Berent" after a lawyer but was incorrectly transcribed and was legally called Bevent

This area of Marathon County was settled primarily by Polish immigrants.

The importance that those immigrants and their descendants placed on their religion was evidenced by many roadside shrines. Individual families and entire parishes used to make pilgrimages to these shrines as part of their observance of religious holidays.

== Geography ==
According to the United States Census Bureau, the town has a total area of 42.7 square miles (110.7 km^{2}), of which 42.1 square miles (109.1 km^{2}) is land and 0.6 square miles (1.7 km^{2}), or 1.50%, is water.

== Demographics ==
The Town of Bevent is one of the greatest (by percentage) Polish-American communities in the U.S. Ancestries: Polish (61.0%), German (30.6%), Irish (4.9%), Norwegian (3.2%), French (2.5%), English (2.4%).

As of the census of 2000, there were 1,126 people, 405 households, and 319 families residing in the town. The population density was 26.7 people per square mile (10.3/km^{2}). There were 484 housing units at an average density of 11.5 per square mile (4.4/km^{2}). The racial makeup of the town was 98.58% White, 0.09% African American, 0.53% from other races, and 0.80% from two or more races. Hispanic or Latino of any race were 2.84% of the population.

There were 405 households, out of which 37.0% had children under the age of 18 living with them, 71.1% were married couples living together, 4.4% had a female householder with no husband present, and 21.0% were non-families. 17.5% of all households were made up of individuals, and 8.4% had someone living alone who was 65 years of age or older. The average household size was 2.78 and the average family size was 3.15.

The population was 25.6% under the age of 18, 8.1% from 18 to 24, 31.0% from 25 to 44, 23.5% from 45 to 64, and 11.8% who were 65 years of age or older. The median age was 37 years. For every 100 females, there were 109.3 males. For every 100 females age 18 and over, there were 109.5 males.

The median income for a household in the town was $45,385, and the median income for a family was $52,250. Males had a median income of $32,865 versus $25,144 for females. The per capita income for the town was $18,315. About 3.5% of families and 5.9% of the population were below the poverty line, including 10.0% of those under age 18 and 8.4% of those age 65 or over.
