= Mountain City, Nevada =

- Census-designated place
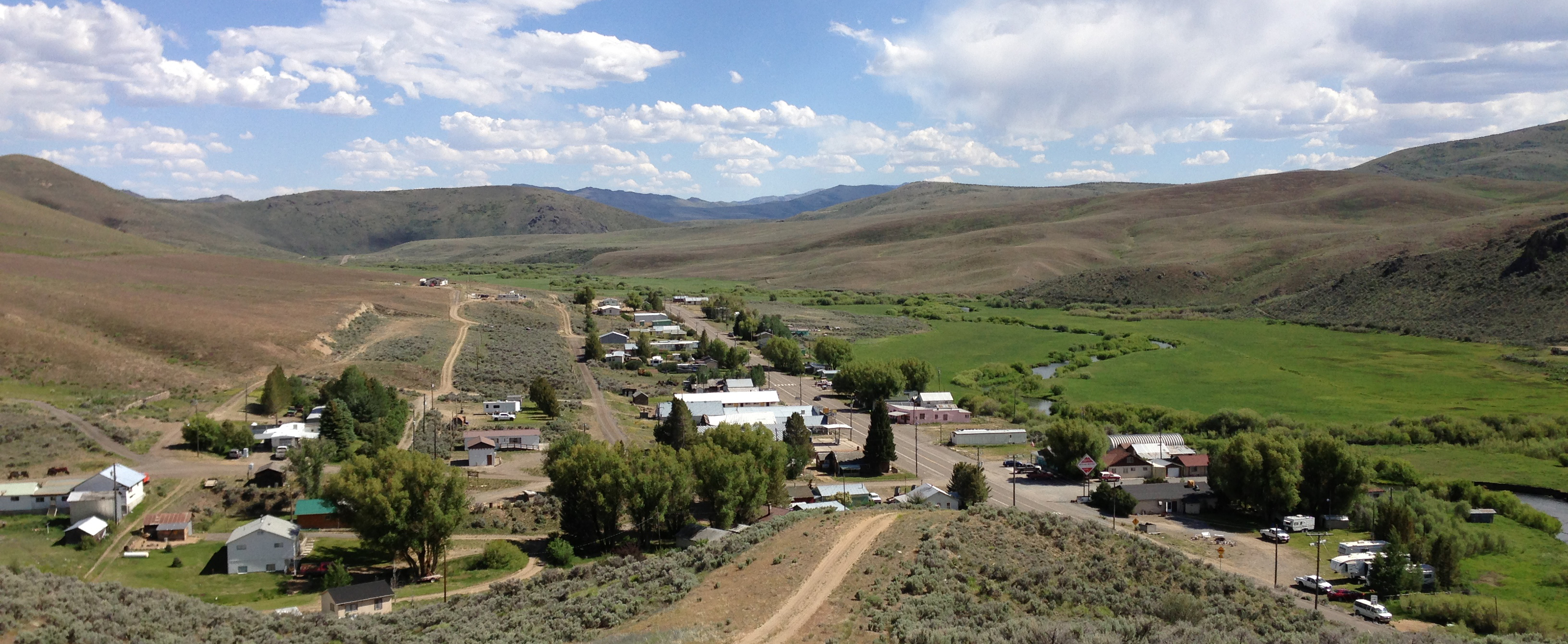
- Mountain City in 2013

- Location within the state of Nevada
- Coordinates: 41°50′14″N 115°57′48″W
- Country: United States
- State: Nevada
- County: Elko

Area
  - Total: 0.18 sq mi (0.46 km^{2})
  - Land: 0.18 sq mi (0.46 km^{2})
  - Water: 0 sq mi (0.00 km^{2})
- Elevation: 5,656 ft (1,724 m)

Population (2020)
  - Total: 14
  - Density: 79.6/sq mi (30.74/km^{2})
- Time zone: UTC−07:00 (Mountain (MST) (see text))
  - Summer (DST): UTC−06:00 (MDT)
- ZIP code: 89831
- Area code: 775
- FIPS code: 32-49200
- GNIS feature ID: 2806678

Mountain City is a census-designated place in Elko County, Nevada, United States, within the Mountain City Ranger District of the Humboldt-Toiyabe National Forest. The community, located on State Route 225 approximately 16 miles (26 km) south of the Idaho border, is situated on the Owyhee River. As of the 2020 census, Mountain City had a population of 14.

== History ==
In 1870, Mountain City was founded after a silver mine was located in the area: over a thousand people lived in Mountain City until the silver ran out, causing an exodus from the town.

In 1879, copper was found at one of the mines north-east of Mountain City: people came rolling back in, causing a boom town for the second time, until the copper was exhausted.

A post office was established at Mountain City in 1870. The community was descriptively named on account of the natural surroundings of its elevated town site. Due to its small size, Mountain City is classified by some writers as a ghost town.

As of 2025 no new buildings or places have been built or constructed in Mountain City: the local town bar has been keeping Mountain City alive for over 20 years.

== Time zone ==
Mountain City, along with the rest of Nevada except for the city of West Wendover, is legally in the Pacific Time Zone, but, along with other Idaho border towns such as Jackpot, Jarbidge and Owyhee, unofficially observes the Mountain Time Zone due to closer proximity to and greater connections with towns in southern Idaho.

== Climate ==
Mountain City sees a humid continental climate (Koppen: Dfb) with four seasons and generally not a large amount of year-round precipitation. Due to its high elevation the area sees very cold nights - even in summer, with frost possible in every month. Winters are bitterly cold at night.

Climate data for Mountain City, Nevada
| Month | Jan | Feb | Mar | Apr | May | Jun | Jul | Aug | Sep | Oct | Nov | Dec | Year |
|---|---|---|---|---|---|---|---|---|---|---|---|---|---|
| Record high °F | 58 | 70 | 71 | 79 | 89 | 95 | 105 | 99 | 95 | 85 | 75 | 64 | 105 |
| Mean daily maximum °F | 38.0 | 42.3 | 47.1 | 56.2 | 65.0 | 74.6 | 84.7 | 84.4 | 75.1 | 63.5 | 47.1 | 39.3 | 59.8 |
| Mean daily minimum °F | 9.4 | 13.2 | 18.5 | 24.3 | 30.9 | 36.4 | 39.7 | 37.7 | 29.8 | 22.1 | 17.1 | 9.9 | 24.1 |
| Record low °F | −48 | −35 | −23 | 2 | 7 | 14 | 20 | 16 | 8 | −10 | −22 | −46 | −48 |
| Average precipitation inches | 1.30 | 1.03 | 1.12 | 1.06 | 1.66 | 1.21 | 0.50 | 0.55 | 0.75 | 0.92 | 1.38 | 1.35 | 12.83 |
| Average snowfall inches | 8.4 | 4.0 | 4.4 | 1.4 | 0.6 | 0 | 0 | 0 | 0 | 0.9 | 1.9 | 6.7 | 28.3 |
| Record high °C | 14 | 21 | 22 | 26 | 32 | 35 | 41 | 37 | 35 | 29 | 24 | 18 | 41 |
| Mean daily maximum °C | 3.3 | 5.7 | 8.4 | 13.4 | 18.3 | 23.7 | 29.3 | 29.1 | 23.9 | 17.5 | 8.4 | 4.1 | 15.4 |
| Mean daily minimum °C | −12.6 | −10.4 | −7.5 | −4.3 | −0.6 | 2.4 | 4.3 | 3.2 | −1.2 | −5.5 | −8.3 | −12.3 | −4.4 |
| Record low °C | −44 | −37 | −31 | −17 | −14 | −10 | −7 | −9 | −13 | −23 | −30 | −43 | −44 |
| Average precipitation mm | 33 | 26 | 28 | 27 | 42 | 31 | 13 | 14 | 19 | 23 | 35 | 34 | 325 |
| Average snowfall cm | 21 | 10 | 11 | 3.6 | 1.5 | 0 | 0 | 0 | 0 | 2.3 | 4.8 | 17 | 71.2 |

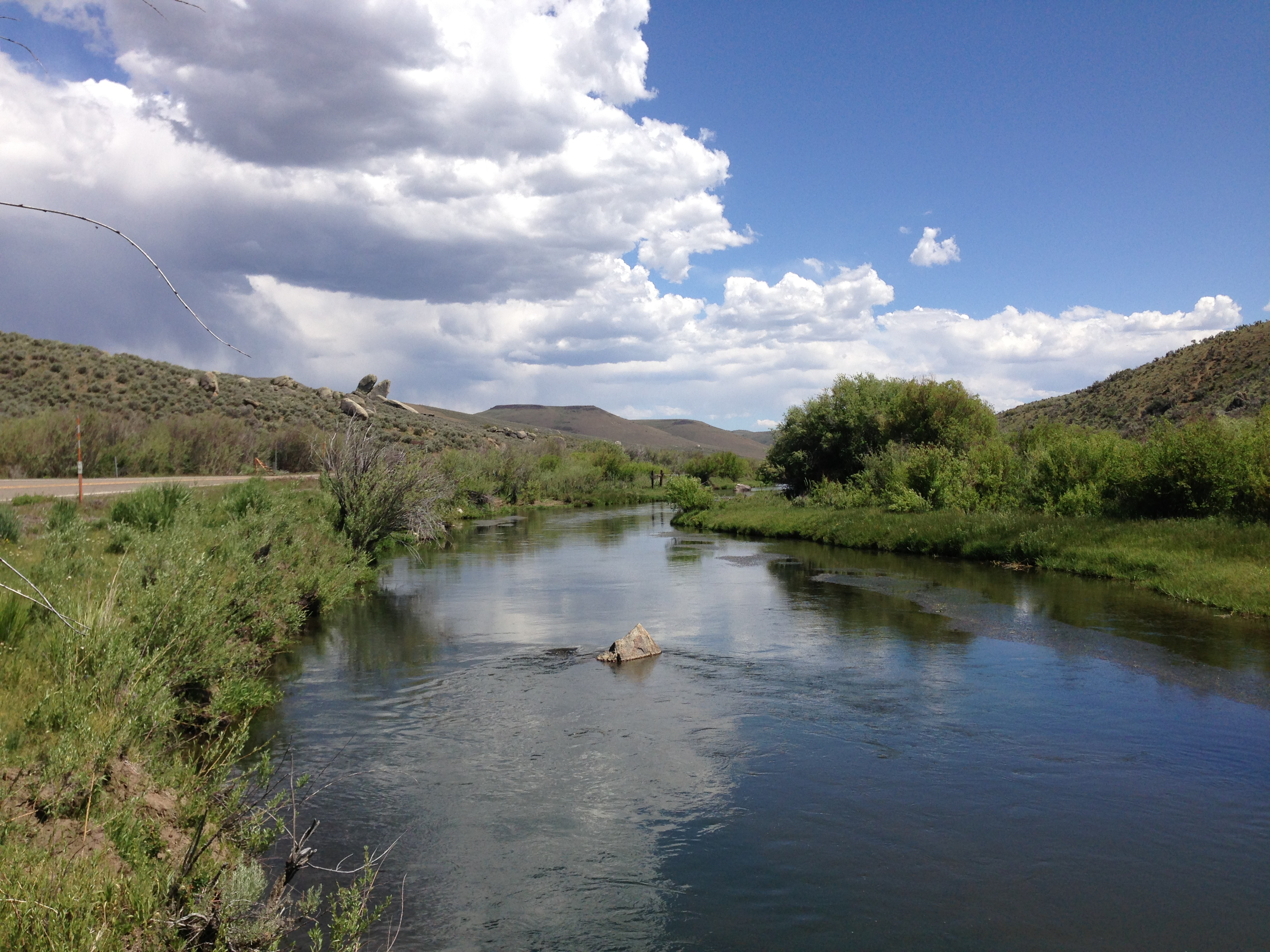
View southeast up the Owyhee River just northwest of Mountain City

== Demographics ==
Historical population
| Census | Pop. | Note | %± |
|---|---|---|---|
| 2020 | 14 | | — |
U.S. Decennial Census
