= List of county routes in Elko County, Nevada =

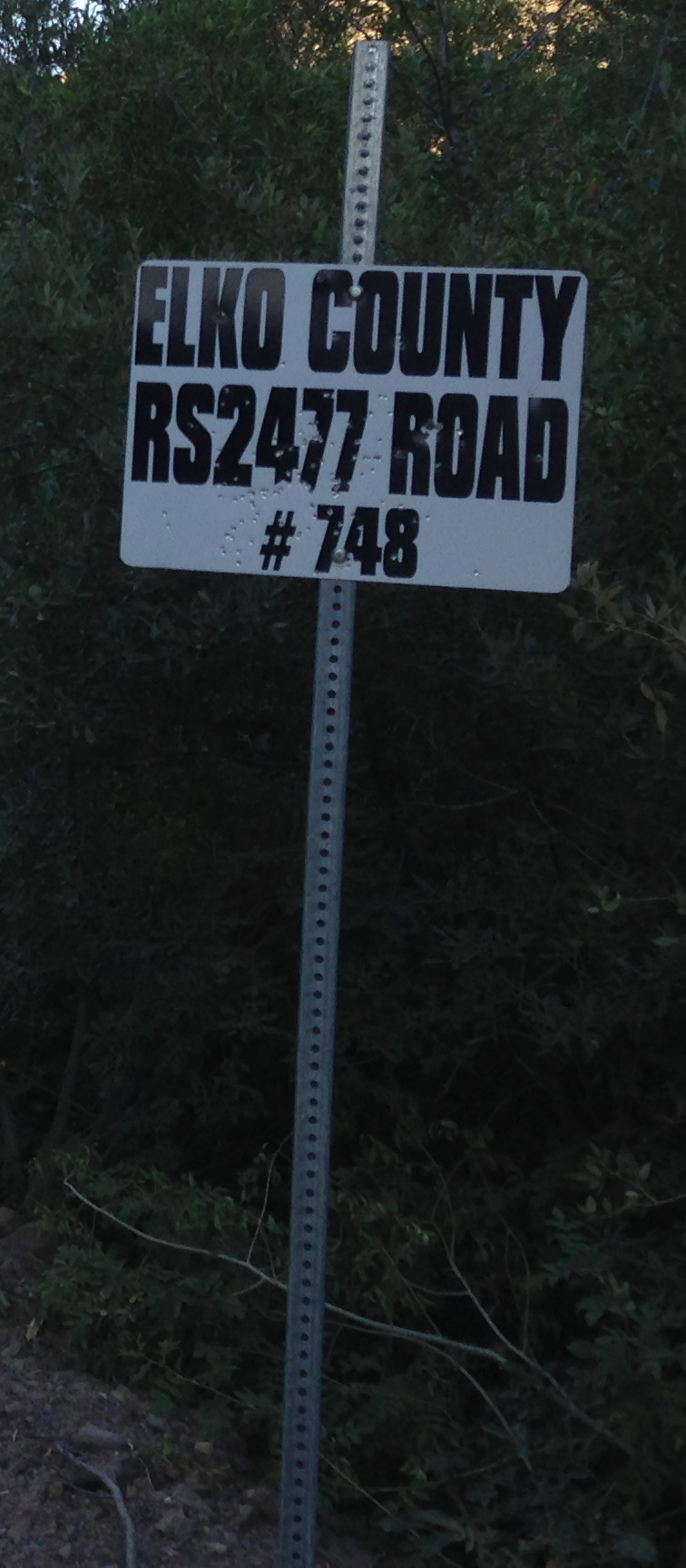
Sign at the north end of Elko County Route 748

List of county routes in Elko County, located in northeastern Nevada.

== Elko County routes ==
Route	Name	Description	Notes
701	Lower Starr Valley Road	SR 230 Intersection near Deeth to Boulder Creek intersection with CR 702.	School bus route—High priority for winter maintenance.
701-B		Deeth streets.	
702	Upper Starr Valley Road	SR 230 to Starr Valley community hall.	School bus route only—High priority for winter maintenance.
702D	Dennis Flat Road	Dennis Flat to intersection with SR 229 near 71 Ranch.	
703	Fort Halleck Road	SR 229 at 71 Ranch to junction with CR 704 and CR 705.	
704	Lamoille Road (Upper)	CR 703 junction via Clubine Lane to Jess Sustacha-Mattice corner intersection with CR 705.	School bus route—High priority for winter maintenance.
705	Lamoille Road (Lower)	CR 703 junction via Ogilvie, Palacio, and Jess Sustacha ranches to church (end of SR 227).	Also known as McKinney Lane.
706	Lower Lamoille Road	CR 705 intersection in Lamoille via Rabbit and Spring Creek to intersection with SR 227.	
707	Crossroads Lane/Mountain View Drive	Lamoille, from church (end of SR 227) to Chas Evans gate.	
708	Country Lane, Country Club, Deer Lane, Rose Hip	Lamoille streets and alleys.	
709	Canyon Road, Hog Tommy Road (Old Lamoille Dump Road)	From SR 227 to Spring Creek Housing.	
710		Pleasant Valley Estates streets.	
711	Boyd-Kennedy Road	SR 227 to translator road turn-off.	Front of school only—high priority for winter maintenance.
711B	Corral Lane	SR 227 to Spring Creek.	
712	Pleasant Valley Road	SR 227 to Chimney Creek intersection with CR 713.	School bus route—high priority for winter maintenance.
713	Upper Lee Road	Spring Creek via Chimney Creek to an intersection with CR 714.	No maintenance in South Fork Reservation.
714	Woods Lane	From SR 228 to the Lee Reservation border.	
715	Lower South Fork Road	SR 228 via Twin Bridges to the South Fork Dam Road, to intersection with SR 228.	
715B	South Fork Causeway	Main road in Lucky Nugget Estates.	
716		Jiggs area roads: Intersection with SR 228 to Harry Peters Ranch. Intersection with SR 228 to Riordan and Smith Creek Ranches. Includes spur to Merkley Ranch and terminating at Achurra Ranch boundary. Intersection with SR 228 at Jiggs to Circle L Ranch. Intersection with SR 228 at Jiggs to Zunino Ranch (Hankins Place). Spur to Merkley Ranch and Zunino Ranch.	No maintenance for spur to Merkley Ranch and Zunino Ranch as no public access.
716A	Smith Creek Road	From Twin Bridges to Harry Peters Ranch.	No winter maintenance.
717	Jiggs Road	Paved road from south end of SR 228 in Jiggs to Zaga Ranch.	
717A	Barnes Ranch Road	Intersection with CR 717 to Barnes Ranch.	No maintenance as no public access.
717B	Corta Ranch Road	Intersection with CR 717 to Corta Ranch via Zaga Ranch, up to “no trespassing signs”.	No winter maintenance.
718	Harrison Pass Road	From south end of CR 717 at Zaga Ranch to intersection with CR 788 (Ruby Valley Road).	No winter maintenance.
719	Huntington Road	Junction with CR 717 to White Pine County line including Doug Mitchell Road to county line.	
720	Bullion Road	From the end of asphalt to Bullion Mine.	No winter maintenance from the bottom of Elko Hills to Bullion Mine.
720D	Cattle Drive/Burgess Lane/Roche Road	From Elko city limits to SR 225.	
720G	Gunrange Road		
720H	Hamilton Stage Road	Off Bullion road (0.3 mile).	Asphalt part.
720L	Last Chance Road	1st mile from Elko city line (from 1st cattle guard).	No maintenance except as per commissioners on 1st mile as stated.
720S	Summit Raceway		Used to be called Sports Complex.
721	Claridge Lane	Claridge sub-division.	
721A	Rockland Drive	Off SR 225—for 1000 feet off-road.	
721B	Sundance Road	From SR 225 - 1st 2/3 mile.	Given old West Airport # on 9/97 when West Airport Road was annexed by City of Elko—ord. #488.
721C	Elburz Road	Interstate 80 frontage road to North Fork Humboldt River crossing to Elburz.	
722	Reed Station Road	SR 226 to Reed Station.	No winter maintenance.
723	Tuscarora Road	SR 226 at Taylor Canyon to Tuscarora.	
724	Midas Road	Tuscarora to Midas to Humboldt County line.	No winter maintenance from Rhoads Ranch to Midas.
728	Owyhee Road	IL mail box via Petan Ranch to Duck Valley Indian Reservation boundary.	No winter maintenance.
729	Trail Creek Road	SR 226 to Ray Morris Ranch, over Maggie Summit to intersection with SR 225 via Bull Run.	No winter maintenance.
730	IL Ranch Road	End of SR 226 at Deep Creek to IL Ranch and meet CR 725 (Squaw Valley intersection).	
731		Mountain City streets.	RTC FUNDING.
732	Jack Creek Summit Road	SR 225–Doheny Ranch	Also known as North Fork Road, no winter maintenance
733	Fox Springs Ranch Road	SR 225 to ranch.	No maintenance as no public access.
734	Van Norman Ranch Road	SR 226 to ranch.	No maintenance as no public access.
735	Wright Ranch Road	SR 226 to ranch.	No maintenance as no public access.
736	Stampede Road	Eureka County line to intersection with SR 226.	No winter maintenance.
737	Saval Ranch Road	SR 225 to ranch.	No winter maintenance.
738	North Tuscarora Road	Tuscarora to SR 226.	No winter maintenance.
741	Adobe Summit-North Fifth Street	Elko city limits to microwave road (Snobowl).	Annexed by city ord. #495 on 1/27/98. County maintains 1st ½ mile after cattle guard.
741A	Kittridge Canyon	Main collector road only - to cattle guard.	
742	Coal Mine-Devil's Gate Road	Ryndon interchange to I-80 to Devil's Gate Ranch via Dankowski cut-off. Includes Frontier and Gold Rush roads & spur to Embry turn-off.	
743	Coal Mine Canyon Road	Embry turn-off, CR 742 to CR 744, to Connelly’s place.	
744	Keddy Ranch Road	SR 225 to Coal Mine turnoff.	No winter maintenance.
745	Twin River Rancho Road	I-80 interchange to last ranch gate. Includes service road to dump and Brent Jones Ranch road by Elburz.	Original Devil's Gate Road.
746	North Fork-Charleston Road	SR 225 to Prunty Ranch on Badger Creek in Charleston.	No winter maintenance.
747	Deeth-Charleston Road	Deeth to intersection with CR 746 at Charleston Reservoir.	No winter maintenance.
748	Charleston-Jarbidge Road	Intersection with CR 746 near the Prunty Ranch in Charleston to the town of Jarbidge, along the Jarbidge River, to Idaho state line near Murphy Hot Springs.	No winter maintenance from CR 746 to Jarbidge.
749	Gold Creek Road	SR 225 at Wild Horse Reservoir to Bruneau River, intersection of CR 750 and CR 751.	No winter maintenance.
750	Rowland Road	Bruneau River, intersection of CR 749 and CR 751 to Idaho state line via Rowland.	No winter maintenance.
751	Diamond A Road	Bruneau River intersection of CR 749 and CR 750 to Idaho state line—via Buck Creek–Deer Creek Grade	Only winter maintenance to Diamond A Ranch per Otis.
752	Shoshone Street	Wells city limits to 200' before R.R.right-of-way.	
753	Deeth-O'Neil Road	Deeth to Gully Ranch, Horace Smith and Twin Meadows Ranch service roads. Gibbs Ranch, Wildcat Canyon, Tabor Creek.	No winter maintenance in Wildcat Canyon.
754	Metropolis Road	Wells to intersection with CR 753 at Pole Creek.	No winter maintenance from end of school bus route to Pole Creek.
755	O'Neil-Hubbard Road	Intersection with CR 753 to US 93 on Hubbard Flat. Boies Reservoir.	
756	Butler Ranch Road	Intersection with CR 755 via Dry Creek to Butler Ranch.	No winter maintenance.
757		Contact town main street.	
761	Jackpot to Little Goose Creek Road	Jackpot to Little Goose Creek, intersection with CR 762 and CR 763.	No winter maintenance. Part of the California Trail Back Country Byway.
762	Goose Creek Road	Little Goose Creek intersection with CR 761 and CR 763 to Utah state line via Rancho Grande Ranch, Trout Creek.	No winter maintenance. Part of the California Trail Back Country Byway.
763	Rock Springs Road	Intersection with CR 765 at Eccles Ranch to intersection with CR 761 at Little Goose Creek.	No winter maintenance. Part of the California Trail Back Country Byway.
765	Wilkins-Montello Road	Intersection with US 93 at Wilkins via Eccles, 12-Mile, 16-Mile, 18-Mile, and Gamble Ranches to Montello, Winecup, and Thousand Springs.	The section from US 93 to Eccles Ranch is part of the California Trail Back Country Byway.
766	12 Mile-Delano Road	Intersection with CR 765 at 12-mile Ranch to Delano Mine via Crittenden Reservoir.	No winter maintenance. Not currently maintained to Delano Mine.
767	Pilot Road	Intersection with SR 233 via Pilot Valley to intersection with I-80.	
768	Tecoma Road	Intersection with SR 233 via Tecoma to Pearson Ranch gate to Utah state line.	Road presently closed to public; no maintenance till road re-opened. No winter maintenance when road re-opened.
770	Cobre Road	Intersection with SR 233 to Cobre.	No winter maintenance. No longer on system.
771	State Experimental Station Road	Intersection with US 93 to Knoll Creek.	No winter maintenance.
772	San Jacinto Road	Intersection with US 93 to ranch.	No winter maintenance. Off system per County Commissioners—private road
773		Montello streets	Grading only if graders in area. RTC FUNDING.
782	Clover Valley Road	Intersection with US 93 to Brough Ranch and joins SR 232.	No winter maintenance.
783	Odger Ranch-Butte Valley Road	Intersection with US 93 to Odger Ranch.	No winter maintenance.
784	Butte Valley Road	Odger Ranch to White Pine County line.	No winter maintenance.
785	Cherry Creek Road	Intersection with US 93 near Currie to White Pine County line.	No winter maintenance.
786	North Ruby Road	Intersection with SR 229 in Cow Hollow to Woolverton Ranch south back to SR 229.	School bus route from SR 229 in Cow Hollow to Woolverton Ranch. No winter maintenance south of Woolverton Ranch.
787	Ruby Valley CCC Road	Intersection with SR 229 to CR 788 intersection near Harrison Pass.	No longer county maintained.
788	South Ruby Valley Road	End of SR 767 to White Pine County line.	School bus route - high priority for winter maintenance.
789	Shafter Road	Intersection with I-80 to Union Pacific Railroad at Shafter.	No winter maintenance.
790	Johnson Ranch Road	Intersection with I-80 to Big Springs Ranch gate.	No winter maintenance.
792		Shanty Town streets.	Private roads.
794	Curtiss Ranch Road	US 93 to ranch property line.	Warm Springs Ranch access site. No longer on system - private road.
795	Victoria Mine Road	US 93 Alternate to Victoria Mine.	12 miles public liability only when mine is operating. Not currently county maintained.
