= Nevada State Route 228 =

State highway in Nevada, United States

State Route 228
- Jiggs Highway

Route information
- Maintained by NDOT
- Length: 26.803 mi (43.135 km)
- Existed: 1976–present

Major junctions
- South end: South of Jiggs
- North end: SR 227 at Spring Creek

Location
- Country: United States
- State: Nevada
- Counties: Elko

Highway system
- Nevada State Highway System; Interstate; US; State; Pre‑1976; Scenic
← SR 227	→ SR 229

State Route 228 (SR 228), also known as Jiggs Highway, is a 20.803-mile (33.479 km) state highway in Elko County, Nevada, United States, that connects Jiggs with Nevada State Route 227 (SR 227/Lamoille Highway) in Spring Creek.

== Route description ==
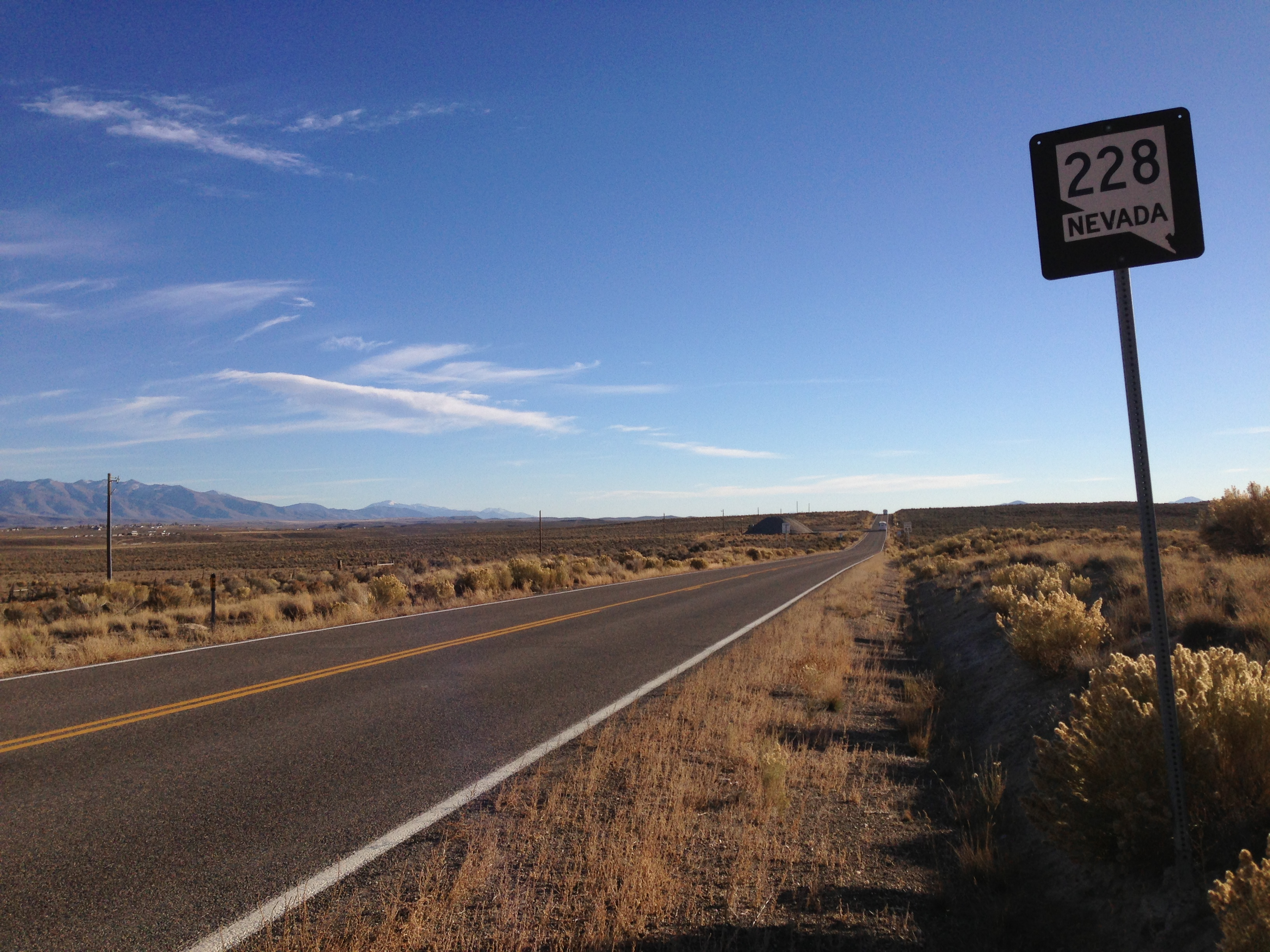
Looking south from the northern terminus of SR 228, October 2013

SR 228 begins at an intersection with Circle Ranch Road near the southern end of Mound Valley, just south of the unincorporated community of Jiggs. (The road continues south from SR 228 as Harrison Pass Road [CR 717], heading southeasterly toward Ruby Valley and the southern terminus of State Route 767 [Ruby Valley Road]. [Harrison Pass Road is asphalt paved until just before reaching Harrison Pass in the Ruby Mountains.] Circle Rand Road heads west as a dirt road toward Huntington Valley.)

From its southern terminus, SR 228 heads northerly as an asphalt paved, two-lane, undivided highway and immediately crosses an unnamed creek (a tributary of Smith Creek). Next the route passes through Jiggs and crosses Smith Creek itself (within the community). North of Jiggs, SR 228 briefly curves to the northeast before resuming its northerly course to ascend out of the Mound Valley. Continuing northerly it passes by the east side of Zunino Reservoir and the Zunino/Jiggs Reservoir Recreation Area

North of the reservoir, SR 228 curves slightly and briefly to the northwest before crossing Cottonwood Creek and resuming its northerly course. After crossing Willow Creek it connects with the west end of Woods Lane (which heads east toward the unincorporated community of Lee). Farther north, the highway curves slightly west to pass by west side of the main part of the indian reservation for the South Fork Band of the Te-Moak Tribe of Western Shoshone Indians (South Fork Reservation). After crossing the South Fork Humboldt River the route again resumes a northerly course and passes to the east of the South Fork State Recreation Area and the South Fork Reservoir. SR 228 continues north to pass between several exclave areas of the South Fork Reservation and pass through the east side of and then the northwest corner of two more exclave areas of the reservation, crossing Tenmile Creek along the way.

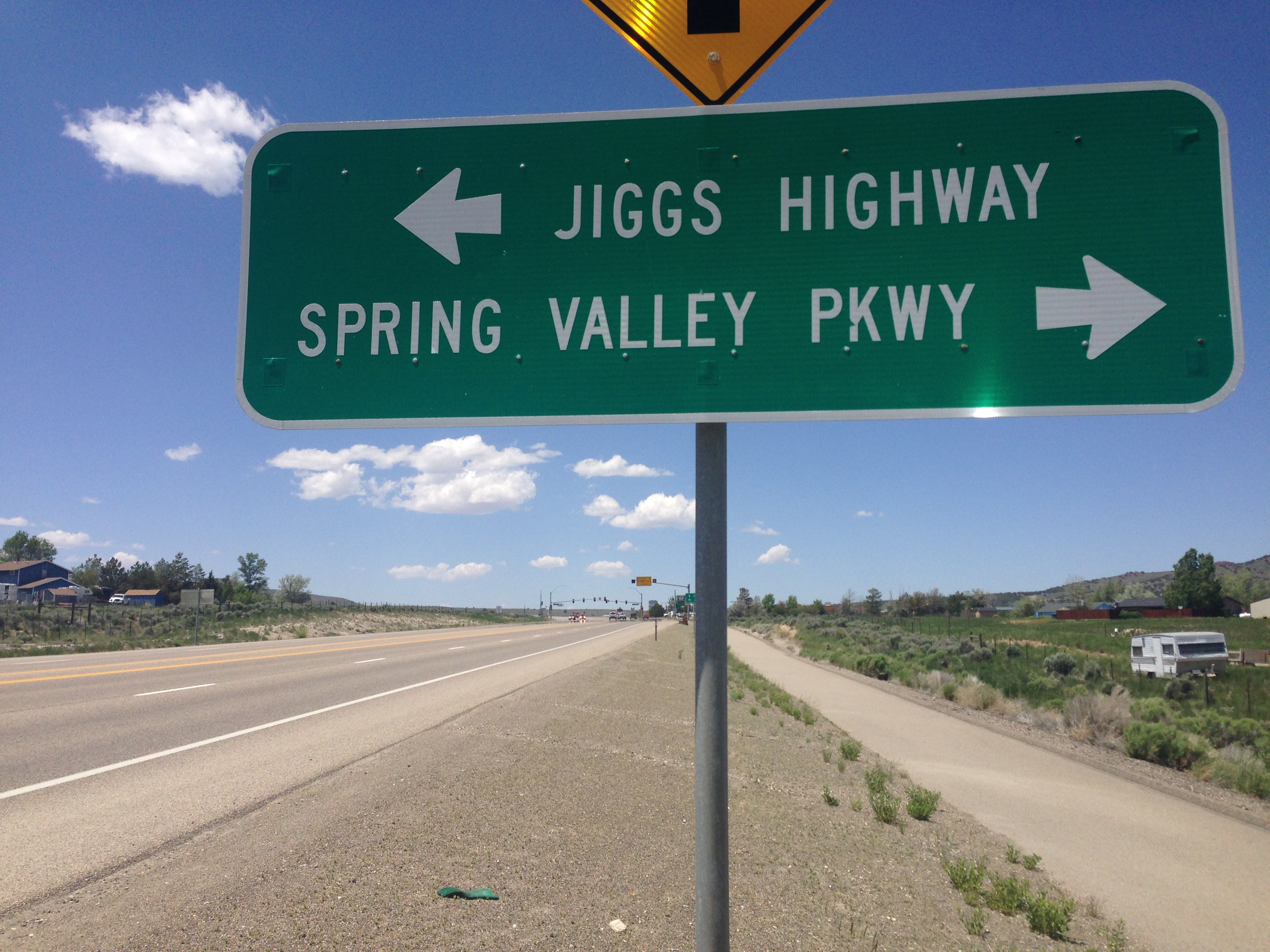
Sign for Jiggs Highway (SR 228) and Spring Valley Parkway along westbound Lamoille Highway (SR 227) in Spring Creek, June 2014

Curving slightly east, SR 228 begins running along the southwestern border of the census-designated place of Spring Creek before reaching its northern terminus at an intersection with SR 227 (Lamoille Highway). (Beyond the northern terminus of SR 228, the road continues north–northeast into Spring Creek as Spring Valley Parkway to loop clockwise back to itself. SR 227 heads southeast for about 13 miles [21 km] to end in Lamoille and northwest for about 7 miles [11 km] to end at State Route 535 [Idaho Street/I-80 Bus] in Elko.)

== History ==
What is now SR 228 was designated as part of State Route 46 prior to 1976.

== Major intersections ==
The entire route is in Elko County.

Location	mi	km	Destinations	Notes
	0.000	0.000	CR 717 south (Harrison Pass Road)	Continues southeast toward southern terminus of SR 767
	0.000	0.000	Circle Ranch Road	Southern terminus; just south of Jiggs
			Bridge over South Fork Humboldt River	
Spring Creek	26.814	43.153	SR 227 west (Lamoille Highway) – Elko SR 227 east (Lamoille Highway) – Lamoille	Northern terminus
Spring Creek	26.814	43.153	Spring Valley Parkway (north)	Road continues north–northeast to loop clockwise back to itself
1.000 mi = 1.609 km; 1.000 km = 0.621 mi

== See also ==
- List of state highways in Nevada
