= Spring Creek, Nevada =

- CDP
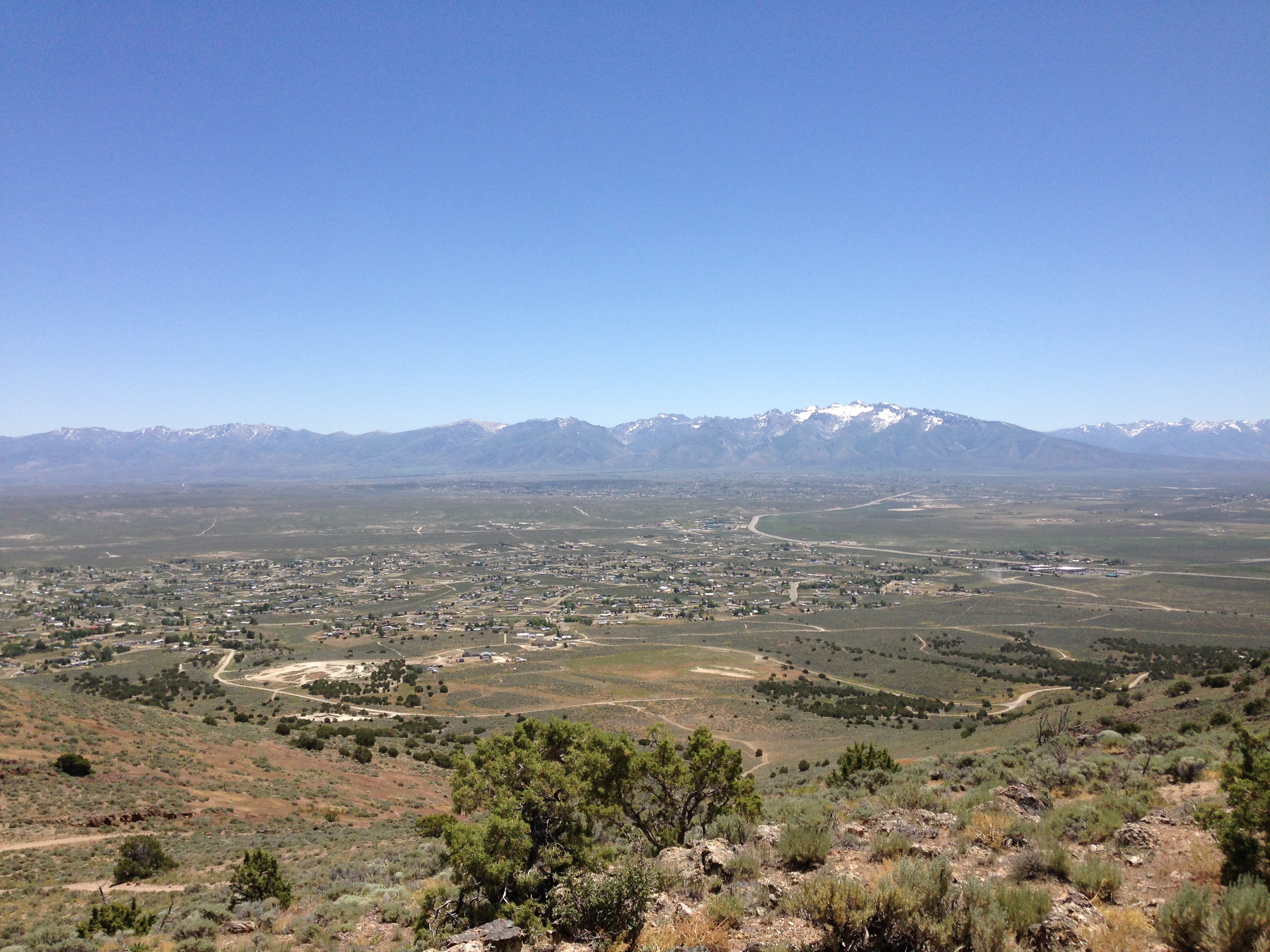
- View of Spring Creek from "E" Mountain, with the Ruby Mountains in the background

- Location of Spring Creek within Nevada
- Coordinates: 40°44′42″N 115°35′54″W
- Country: United States
- State: Nevada
- County: Elko

Area
  - Total: 53.73 sq mi (139.17 km^{2})
  - Land: 53.66 sq mi (138.99 km^{2})
  - Water: 0.066 sq mi (0.17 km^{2})
- Elevation: 5,446 ft (1,660 m)

Population (2020)
  - Total: 14,967
  - Density: 278.9/sq mi (107.68/km^{2})
- Time zone: UTC−8 (Pacific (PST))
  - Summer (DST): UTC−7 (PDT)
- ZIP code: 89815
- Area code: 775
- FIPS code: 32-68550
- GNIS feature ID: 2408791

Spring Creek is a census-designated place (CDP) in central Elko County, in northeastern Nevada in the western United States. It mainly serves as a bedroom community for the businesses and industries in and around the nearby city of Elko. It is part of the Elko Micropolitan Statistical Area. As of the 2020 census, Spring Creek had a population of 14,967.

== Geography ==
Spring Creek is located in a large valley between the Elko Hills to the northwest, and the Ruby Mountains to the southeast. To the southwest is Huntington Valley and the South Fork of the Humboldt River, while to the north is the main branch of the Humboldt. The city of Elko is approximately 6 miles (9.7 km) to the northwest, while Lamoille is just to the east. According to the United States Census Bureau, the CDP has a total area of 58.7 square miles (152 km^{2}).

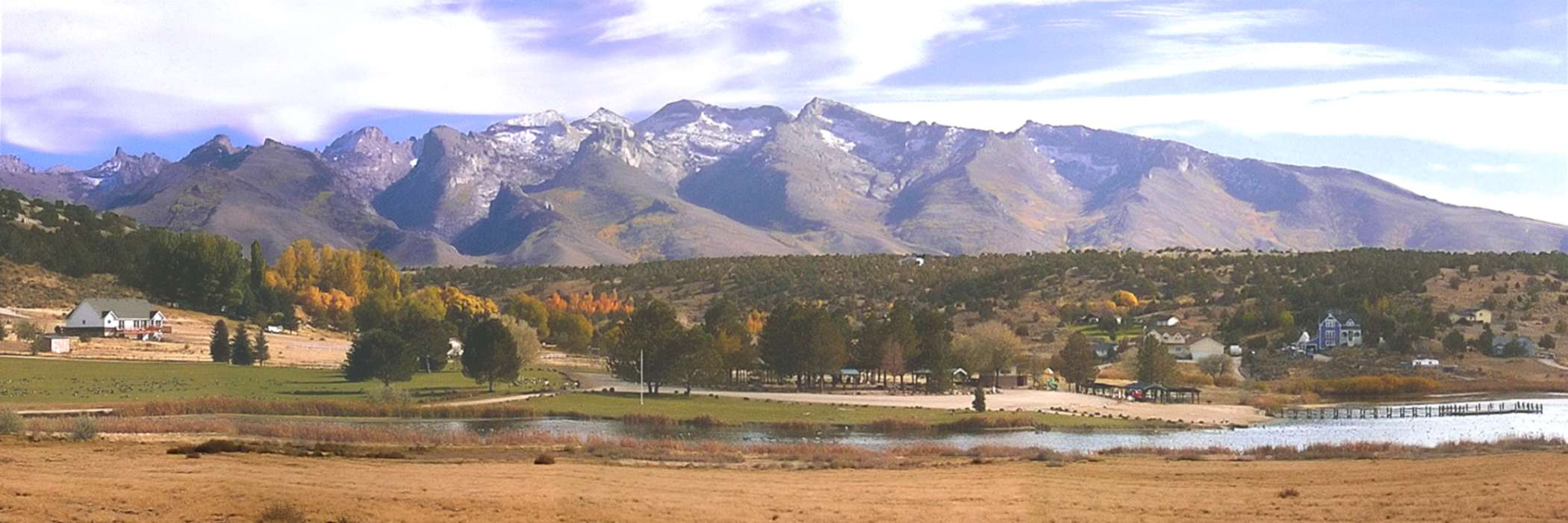
Marina Park in Spring Creek, Nevada

The community was developed in the 1970s by C. V. Wood, president of McCulloch Oil, as three large housing sections. The western section, at the base of the Elko Hills, is located near the post office (zip 89815), a shopping center, and a supermarket. About 1 mile to the east is the main school campus for grades 1-12. The central section of the community, another mile to the east, includes a park and lake (The Marina), and an 18-hole golf course and clubhouse. Nearby are an outdoor sports complex and a second elementary school. The southern section of the community surrounds an indoor sports arena (The Horse Palace), and is adjacent to the Ruby Mountains and a community-owned campground.

== Demographics ==
Historical population
Census	Pop.	Note	%±
1990	5,866		—
2000	10,548		79.8%
2010	12,361		17.2%
2020	14,967		21.1%

=== 2020 census ===
As of the 2020 census, Spring Creek had a population of 14,967. The median age was 34.0 years. 30.3% of residents were under the age of 18 and 10.2% of residents were 65 years of age or older. For every 100 females there were 105.0 males, and for every 100 females age 18 and over there were 105.2 males age 18 and over.

0.0% of residents lived in urban areas, while 100.0% lived in rural areas.

There were 5,120 households in Spring Creek, of which 41.4% had children under the age of 18 living in them. Of all households, 66.4% were married-couple households, 15.7% were households with a male householder and no spouse or partner present, and 11.4% were households with a female householder and no spouse or partner present. About 15.9% of all households were made up of individuals and 5.5% had someone living alone who was 65 years of age or older.

There were 5,390 housing units, of which 5.0% were vacant. The homeowner vacancy rate was 1.2% and the rental vacancy rate was 7.9%.

Racial composition as of the 2020 census
Race	Number	Percent
White	12,850	85.9%
Black or African American	35	0.2%
American Indian and Alaska Native	222	1.5%
Asian	96	0.6%
Native Hawaiian and Other Pacific Islander	14	0.1%
Some other race	497	3.3%
Two or more races	1,253	8.4%
Hispanic or Latino (of any race)	1,524	10.2%

=== 2010 census ===
As of the census of 2010, there were 12,362 people, 4,204 households, and 3,425 families residing in the CDP. The population density was 179.8 inhabitants per square mile (69.4/km^{2}). There were 4,394 housing units at an average density of 62.4 per square mile (24.1/km^{2}). The racial makeup of the CDP was 92.5% White, 0.3% African American, 1.6% Native American, 0.6% Asian, 0.1% Pacific Islander, 2.3% from other races, and 2.6% from two or more races. Hispanic or Latino of any race were 7.8% of the population.

There were 4,204 households, out of which 44.1% had children under the age of 18 living with them, 75.2% were married couples living together, 4.7% had a female householder with no husband present, and 15.0% were non-families. 11.0% of all households were made up of individuals, and 1.6% had someone living alone who was 65 years of age or older. The average household size was 3.10 and the average family size was 3.35.

In the CDP, the population was spread out, with 35.1% under the age of 18, 6.0% from 18 to 24, 33.5% from 25 to 44, 22.1% from 45 to 64, and 3.2% who were 65 years of age or older. The median age was 32 years. For every 100 females, there were 105.0 males. For every 100 females age 18 and over, there were 104.9 males.

=== Income and poverty ===
The median income for a household in the CDP was $109,952, and the median income for a family was $118,899. Males had a median income of $50,053 versus $27,260 for females. The per capita income for the CDP was $20,606. About 2.9% of families and 4.2% of the population were below the poverty line, including 2.7% of those under age 18 and 8.2% of those age 65 or over.

== Transportation ==
SR 227, more commonly known as Lamoille Highway, is the primary highway through Spring Creek, connecting it to Lamoille and Elko. SR 228, also known as Jiggs Highway, begins at SR 227 in Spring Creek and continues south to Jiggs; the road eventually reaches Ruby Valley after losing its state highway designation. Passenger rail service is available from the nearby Elko Train Station, while commercial air service can be found at the Elko Regional Airport.

== Media ==
- Elko Television District
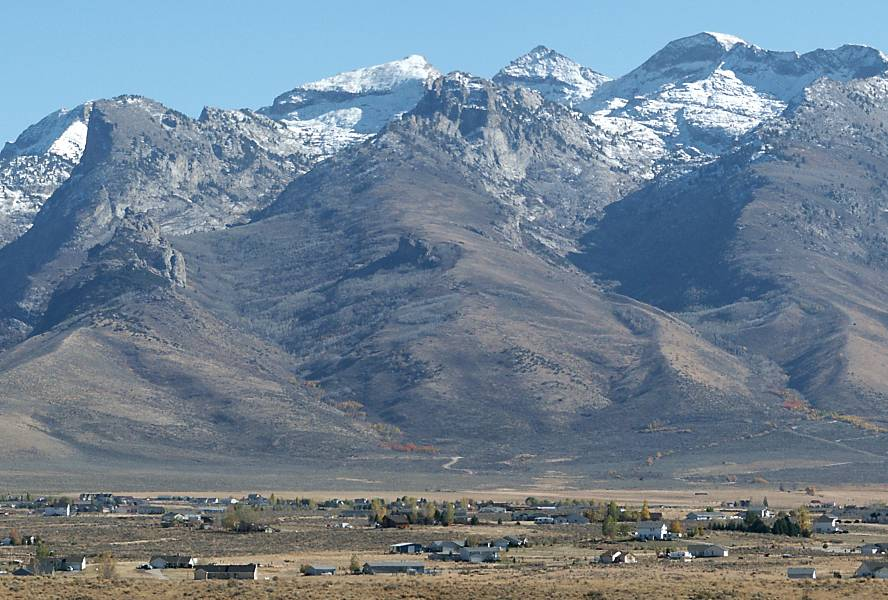
Spring Creek lies at the base of the Ruby Mountains

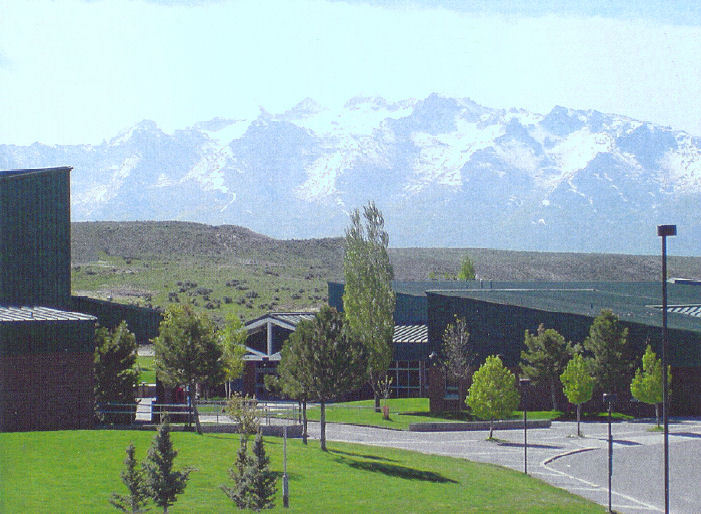
Spring Creek High School

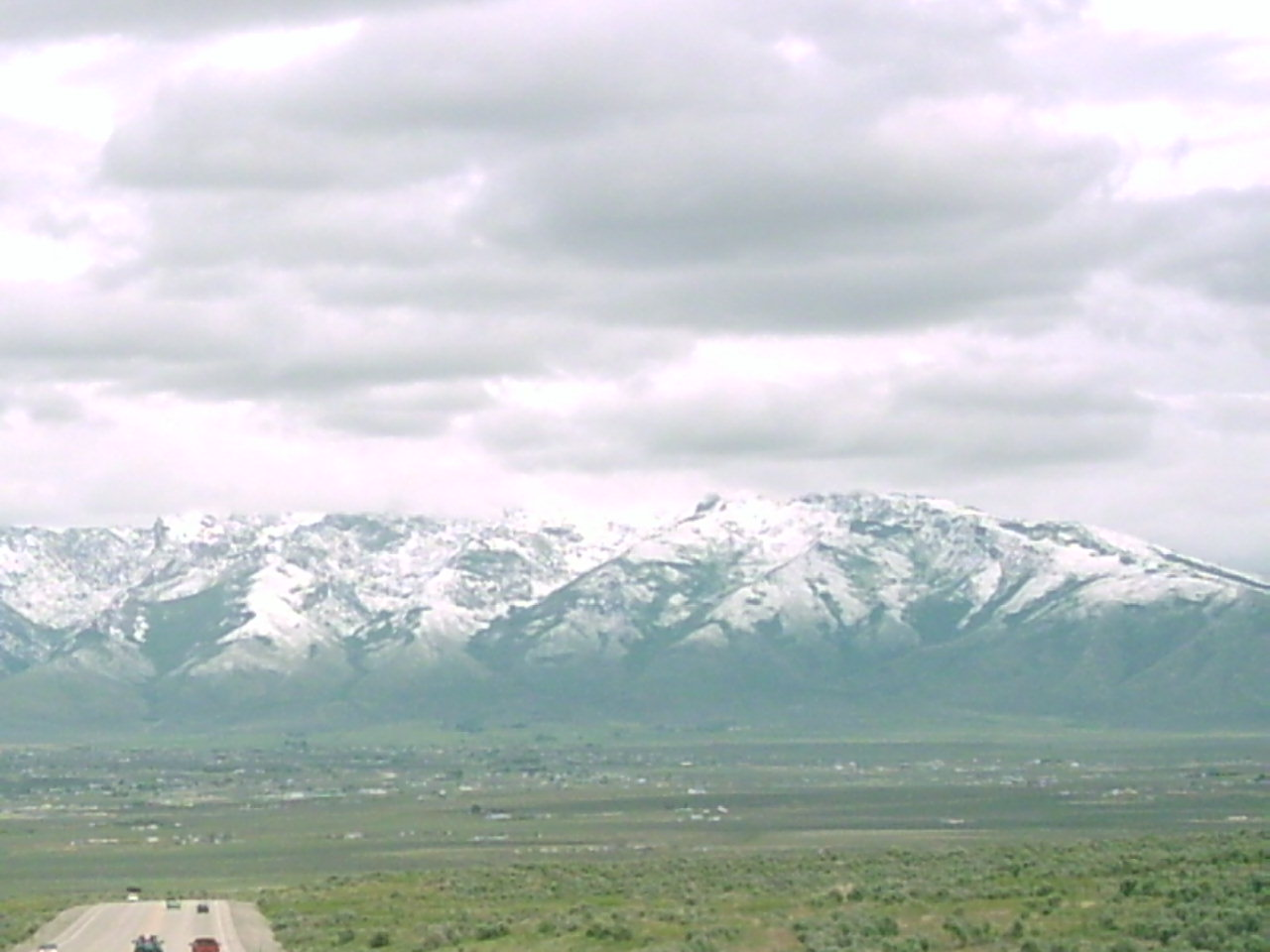
Spring Creek from Lamoille Summit

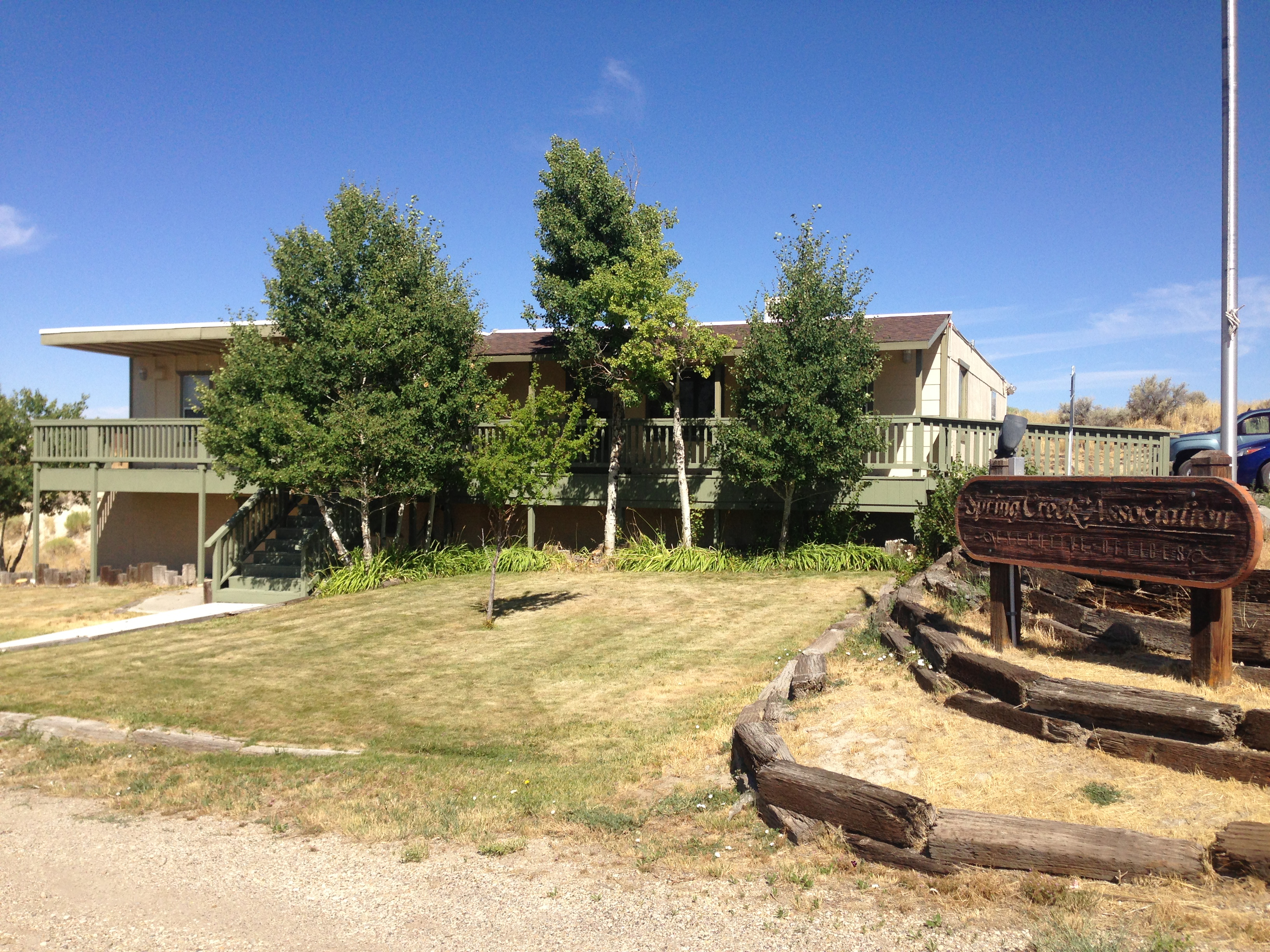
Spring Creek Association Executive Offices
