= Nevada State Route 227 =

State highway in Nevada, United States

State Route 227
- Lamoille Highway
- SR 227 highlighted in red

Route information
- Maintained by NDOT
- Length: 20.134 mi (32.403 km)
- Existed: 1976–present

Major junctions
- Northwest end: I-80 BL / SR 535 in Elko
- Southeast end: Crossroad Lane in Lamoille

Location
- Country: United States
- State: Nevada

Highway system
- Nevada State Highway System; Interstate; US; State; Pre‑1976; Scenic
| ← SR 226 | → SR 228 |

State Route 227 (SR 227), most of which is more commonly known locally as Lamoille Highway, is a 20.134-mile-long (32.403 km) state highway in Elko County in northeastern Nevada.

== Route description ==
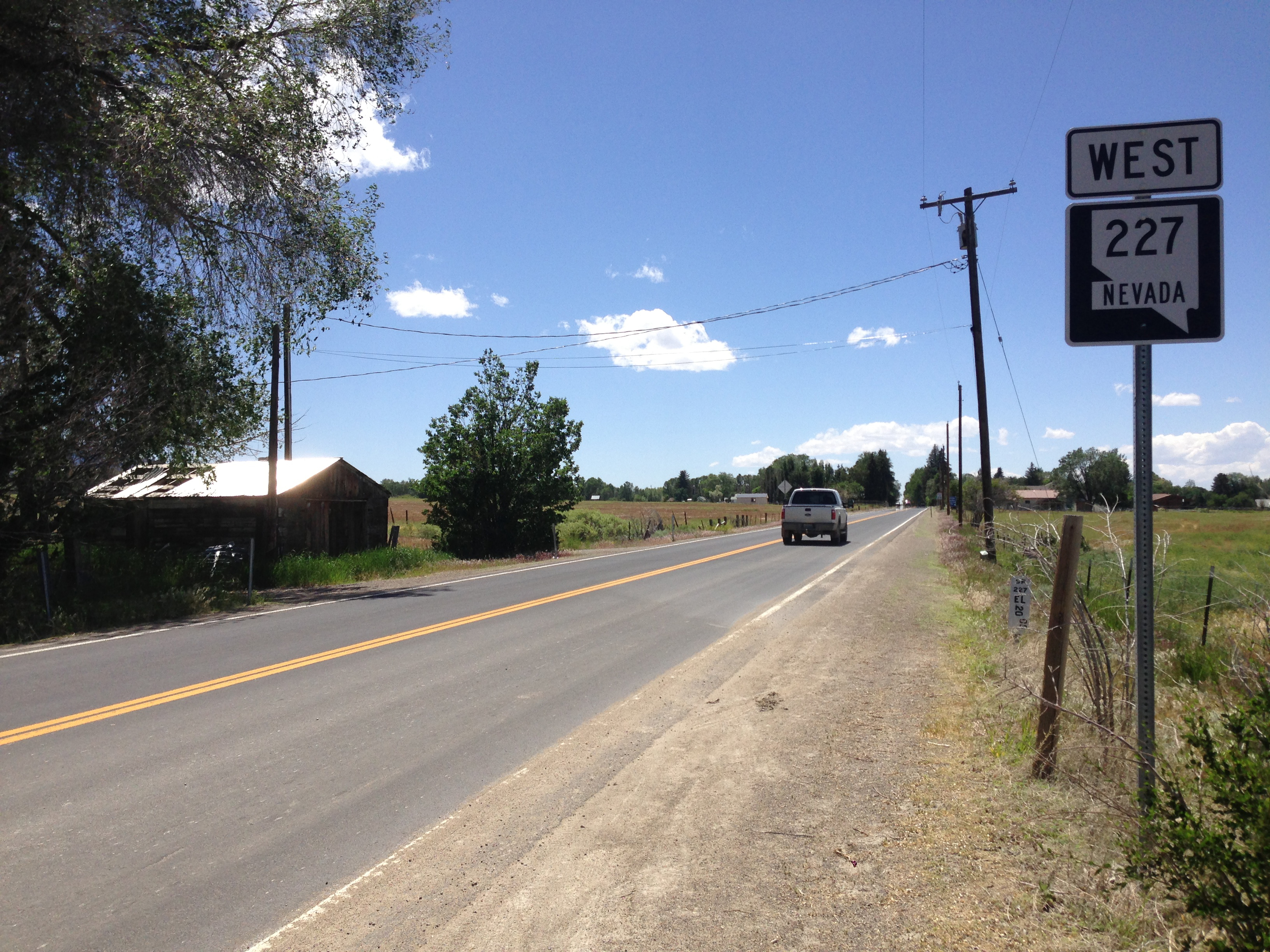
First reassurance sign along westbound SR 227 in Lamoille

SR 227 starts at SR 535/Interstate 80 Business Loop (Idaho Street) in the center of downtown Elko. From there, it follows 5th Street southeast, which at this point is 4 lanes wide with a center turn lane and a 25 mph speed limit. After passing Silver Street, it loses the center turning lane and crosses a bridge over the Union Pacific Railroad and the Humboldt River. It narrows down to 2 lanes after passing Wilson Avenue, then loses the center turning lane beyond Carlin Court, all the while turning towards a northeasterly direction and becoming known as Lamoille Highway. After passing 12th Street, it regains 2 additional lanes and begins to gradually turn back towards the south as it begins ascending Lamoille Summit. The speed limit, 35 mph at 12th Street, gradually increases to 55 mph by the time it reaches Lamoille Summit. From Lamoille Summit, it continues in a general southeasterly direction into and through the community of Spring Creek, maintaining the 55 mph speed limit and 4 lanes for most of the way. It intersects with SR 228 (Jiggs Highway) in the northwestern section of Spring Creek. Further southeast, it passes through a roundabout in the central portion of Spring Creek where it intersects Spring Creek Parkway and Licht Parkway. Further southeast, near Palace Parkway, it again narrows down to just 2 lanes and turns due east, though it maintains the 55 mph speed limit. Just before entering the small town of Lamoille, it intersects Lamoille Canyon Road, a National Forest Scenic Byway which heads up into Lamoille Canyon. The speed limit finally reduces down to 25 mph as it enters the small town of Lamoille. On the eastern side of Lamoille, the road ends at an intersection with Elko County Routes 705 and 707.

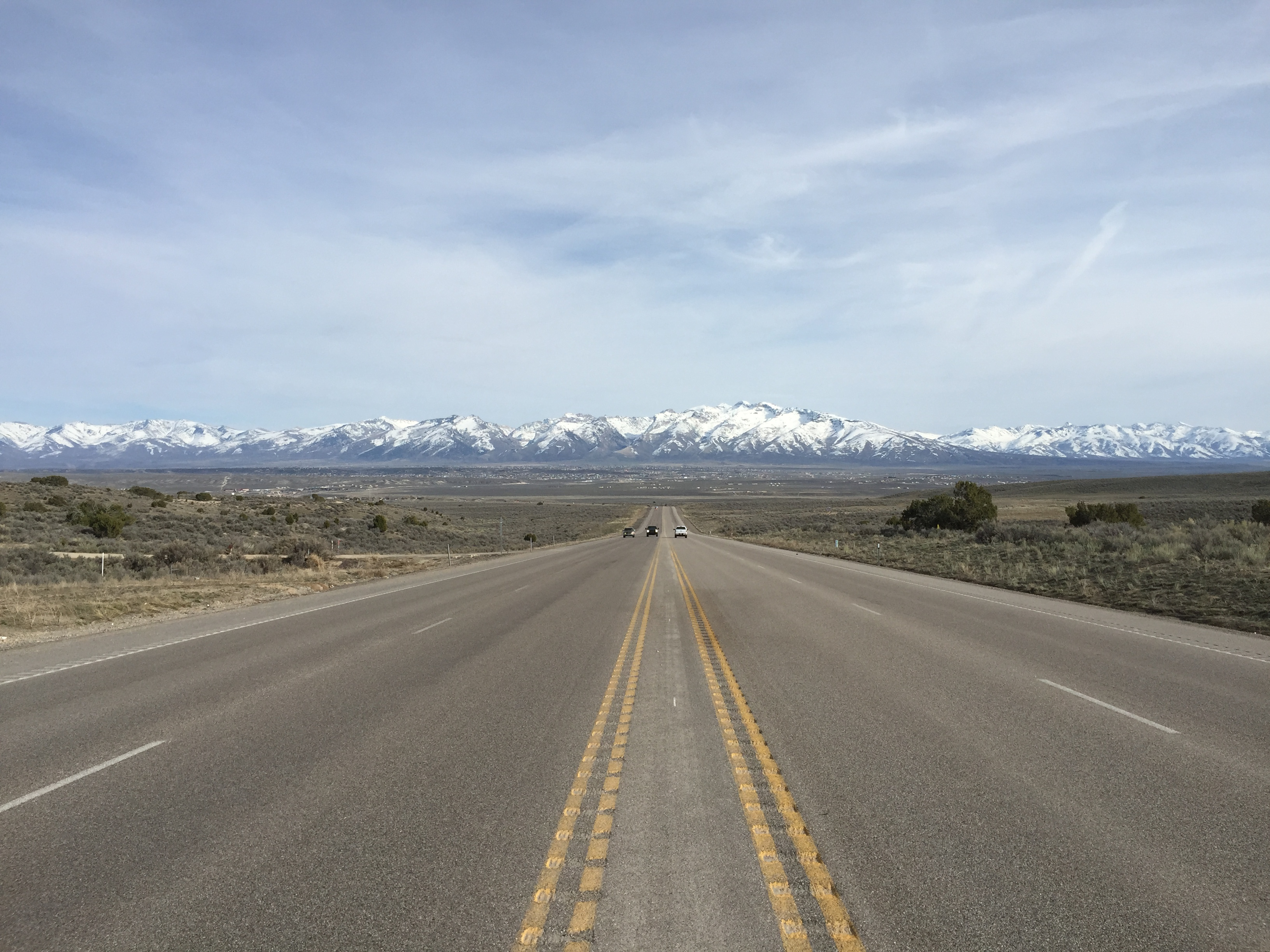
View southeast from Lamoille Summit

== History ==
SR 227 comprised a portion of State Route 46 prior to 1976.

== Major intersections ==
The entire route is in Elko County.

| Location | mi | km | Destinations | Notes |
|---|---|---|---|---|
| Elko | 0.000 | 0.000 | I-80 BL / SR 535 (Idaho Street) | Western terminus |
| | | | SR 228 – Jiggs | |
| Lamoille | | | Lamoille Canyon Road | |
| Lamoille | 20.134 | 32.403 | Crossroad Lane | Eastern terminus |
1.000 mi = 1.609 km; 1.000 km = 0.621 mi

== See also ==
- List of state highways in Nevada
