= East Peak =

East Peak may refer to:

- East Peak (Douglas County, Nevada), highest point in Douglas County, Nevada
- East Peak (Elko County, Nevada)
- East Peak, former name of Wright Place, California
- East Peak (New Haven County, Connecticut)
- East Peak in Silver Bow County, Montana
- East Spanish Peak, one of the Spanish Peaks in Huerfano County, Colorado
