= Grindstone Mountain (Nevada) =

Mountain in Nevada, United States

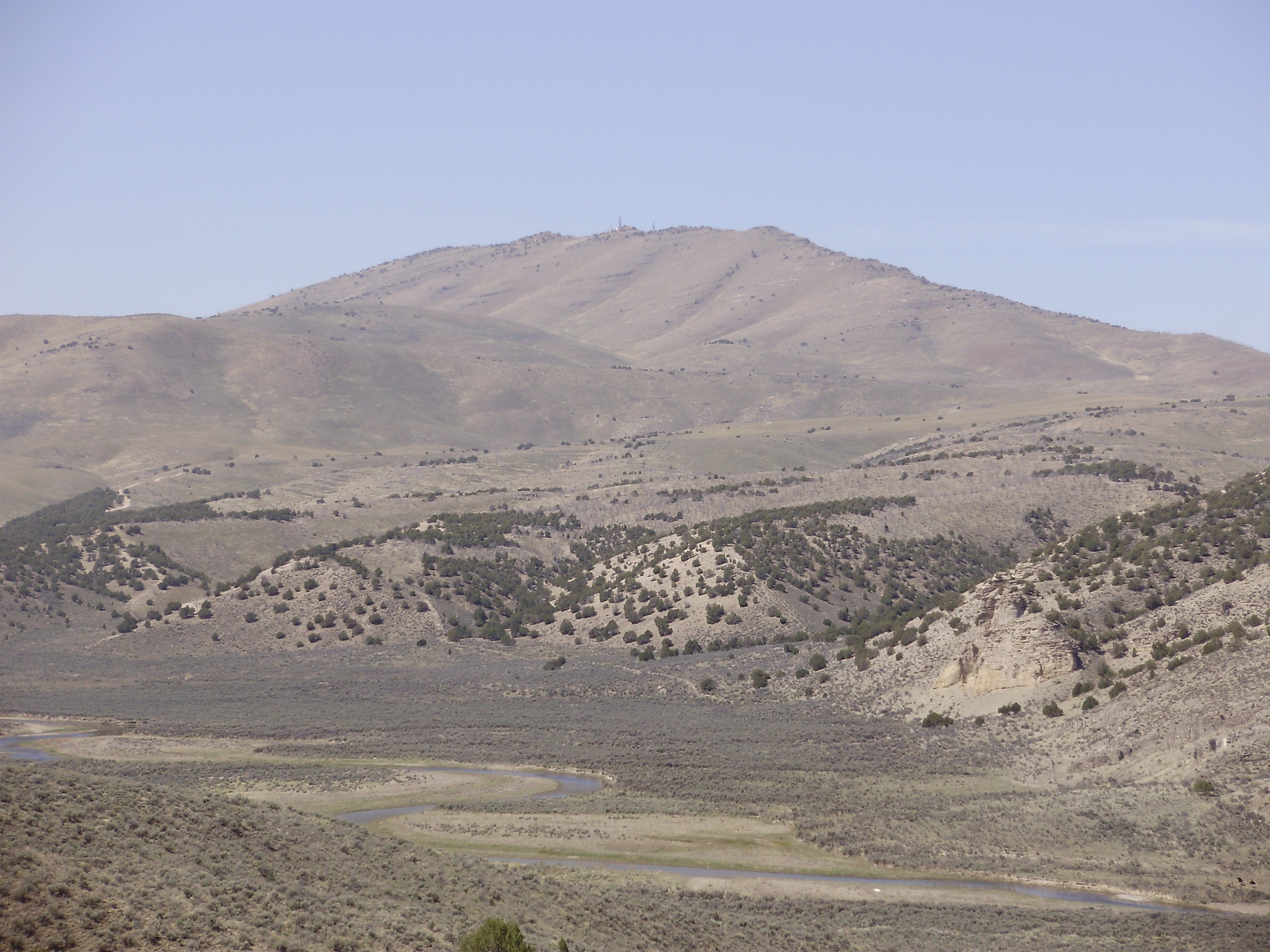
- Grindstone Mountain, with the South Fork Humboldt River in the foreground

Highest point
- Elevation: 7,382 ft (2,250 m) NAVD 88
- Prominence: 1,197 ft (365 m)
- Coordinates: 40°41′52″N 115°54′16″W

Geography
- Location within Nevada
- Location: Elko County, Nevada, U.S.
- Parent range: Elko Hills
- Topo map: USGS Grindstone Mountain

Climbing
- Easiest route: A dirt road (high clearance required) leads northwest from Bullion Road (Elko County Route 720) to radio facilities on the summit

Grindstone Mountain is a mountain in the Elko Hills of Elko County, Nevada, United States. There are several radio towers at the summit.

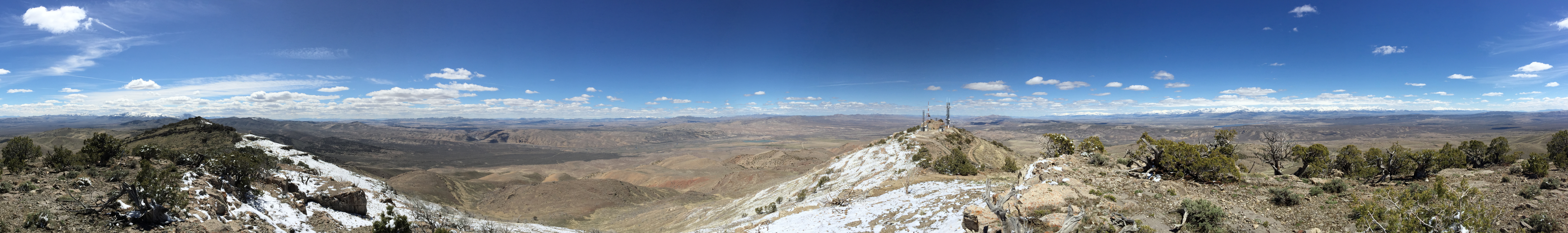
360-degree panorama from the summit of Grindstone Mountain
