= Ruby Valley, Nevada =

Unincorporated community in Nevada, United States

- Unincorporated community
- Location within Nevada
- Coordinates: 40°21′37″N 115°26′51″W
- Country: United States
- State: Nevada
- County: Elko
- Elevation: 6,079 ft (1,853 m)
- Time zone: UTC-7 (Mountain (MST))
  - Summer (DST): UTC-7 (MST, year round)
- ZIP code: 89833
- Area code: 775
- GNIS feature ID: 862228

Ruby Valley is an unincorporated community in Ruby Valley, in Elko County, Nevada, United States.

It was the site of the Ruby Valley Pony Express Station, which has since been moved 60 miles (97 km) to Elko, Nevada and restored and listed on the National Register of Historic Places.

Ruby Valley has a small K-8 school and many cattle ranches. Ruby Lake National Wildlife Refuge and state-owned Gallagher Fish Hatchery are in Ruby Valley.

== History ==
On October 1, 1863, the Treaty of Ruby Valley was signed by Gov. James W. Nye of the Nevada Territory and Gov. James Duane Doty of the Utah Territory. Twelve chiefs signed for the Western Bands of the Shoshone Nation of Indians. The treaty assured their ownership of property (that later became a U.S. nuclear test site). The treaty stated that the presence of U.S. settlements will not negate Native sovereignty. The Western Shoshone did not cede land but agreed to allow the U.S. government the "right to traverse the area, maintain existing telegraph and stage lines, construct one railroad, and engage in specified economic activities." The Union relied on this treaty to demonstrate to European governments and banks backing the Union that it could provide the gold needed for the American Civil War.
