= Nevada State Route 767 =

Highway in Nevada

State Route 767
- Ruby Valley Road
- SR 767 highlighted in red

Route information
- Maintained by NDOT
- Length: 1.924 mi (3.096 km)
- Existed: 1976–present

Major junctions
- South end: Ruby Valley Road north of Ruby Valley
- North end: SR 229 southeast of Halleck

Location
- Country: United States
- State: Nevada

Highway system
- Nevada State Highway System; Interstate; US; State; Pre‑1976; Scenic
← SR 766	→ SR 773

State Route 767 (SR 767) is a short state highway in the Ruby Valley region of Elko County, Nevada. It follows a portion of Ruby Valley Road.

== Route description ==
SR 767 begins in Ruby Valley, north of the agricultural town of the same name, where Elko County Route 788 transitions from gravel road to pavement. The highway continues north along the eastern foothills of the Ruby Mountains to its northern terminus at a Y-junction with Secret Pass Road (SR 229) east of Ruby Dome.

== History ==
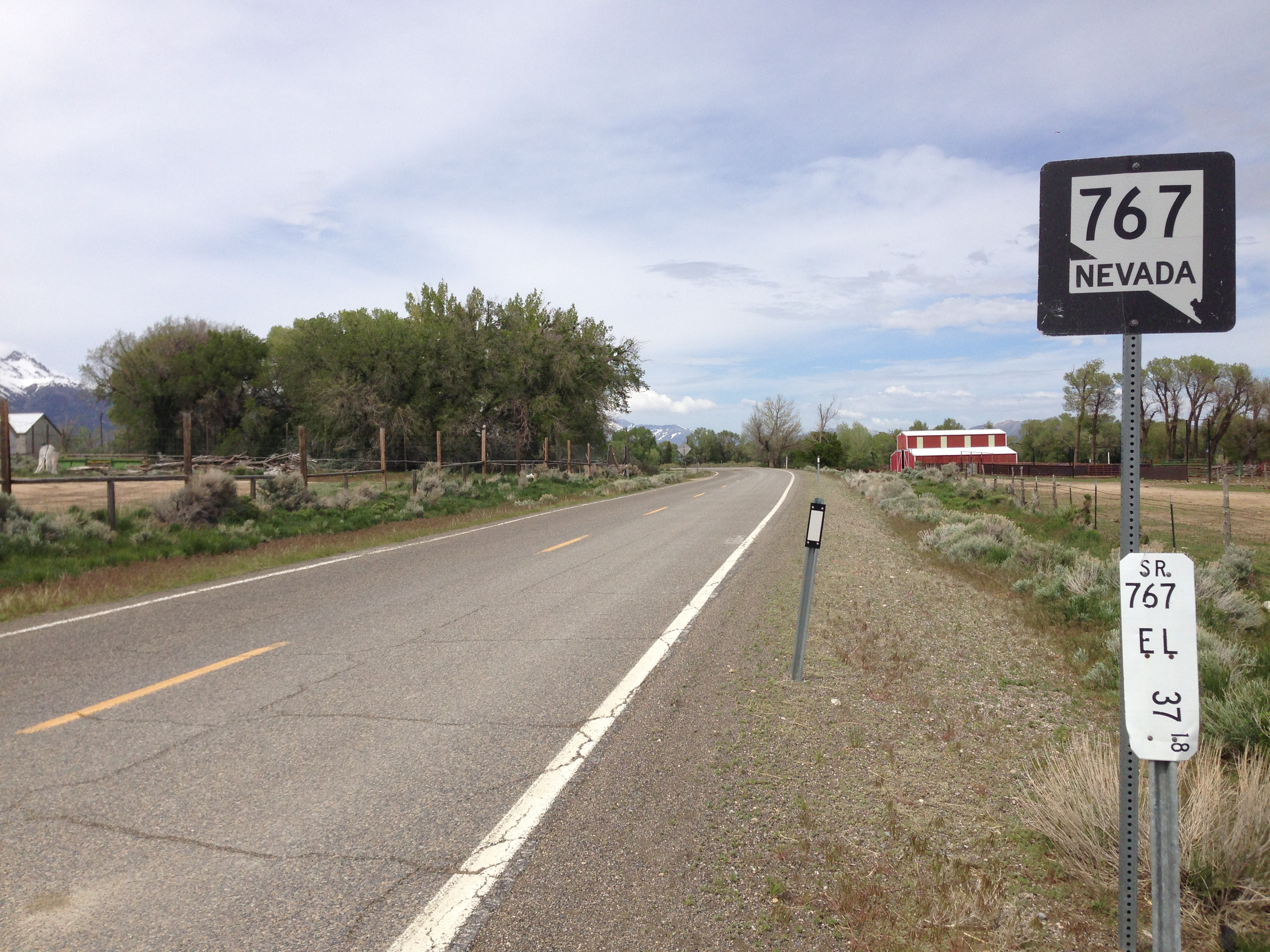
View at the south end of SR 767 looking northbound

Ruby Valley Road follows part of what was once known as the Hastings Cutoff, a route which was at the time thought to be a more direct route of the California Trail through the northeastern part of Nevada.

SR 767 was established as a state highway on July 1, 1976. It has remained unchanged since its adoption into the state highway system.

== Major intersections ==
The entire route is in Elko County.

Location	mi	km	Destinations	Notes
	0.000	0.000	Ruby Valley Road (Elko CR 788) – Ruby Valley	Continuation beyond southern terminus
	1.924	3.096	SR 229 (Secret Pass Road) – Halleck, Wells	
1.000 mi = 1.609 km; 1.000 km = 0.621 mi
