= Nevada State Route 535 =

Highway in Nevada

State Route 535
- Idaho Street
- I-80 Business highlighted red and blue; portions signed as SR 535 highlighted in red

Route information
- Maintained by NDOT
- Length: 3.192 mi (5.137 km)
- Existed: July 1, 1976–present

Major junctions
- West end: I-80 just west of Elko
- East end: SR 227 / I-80 BL in Elko

Location
- Country: United States
- State: Nevada
- County: Elko

Highway system
- Interstate Highway System; Main; Auxiliary; Suffixed; Business; Future; Nevada State Highway System; Interstate; US; State; Pre‑1976; Scenic
← SR 490	→ SR 562

State Route 535 (SR 535) is the Nevada Department of Transportation (NDOT) designation for two discontinuous sections of Idaho Street just west of and within the small city of Elko in the northeastern part of the U.S. state of Nevada. Both segments are also signed as Interstate 80 Business, which is also signed along the city-maintained segment of Idaho Street between the two NDOT segments as well as the city-maintained segment of Idaho Street east of the final eastern terminus all the way to East Jennings Way, from which it connects to the Elko East exit on Interstate 80. Most of Interstate 80 Business in Elko, including both segments of SR 535, were formerly designated U.S. Route 40.

== Route description ==
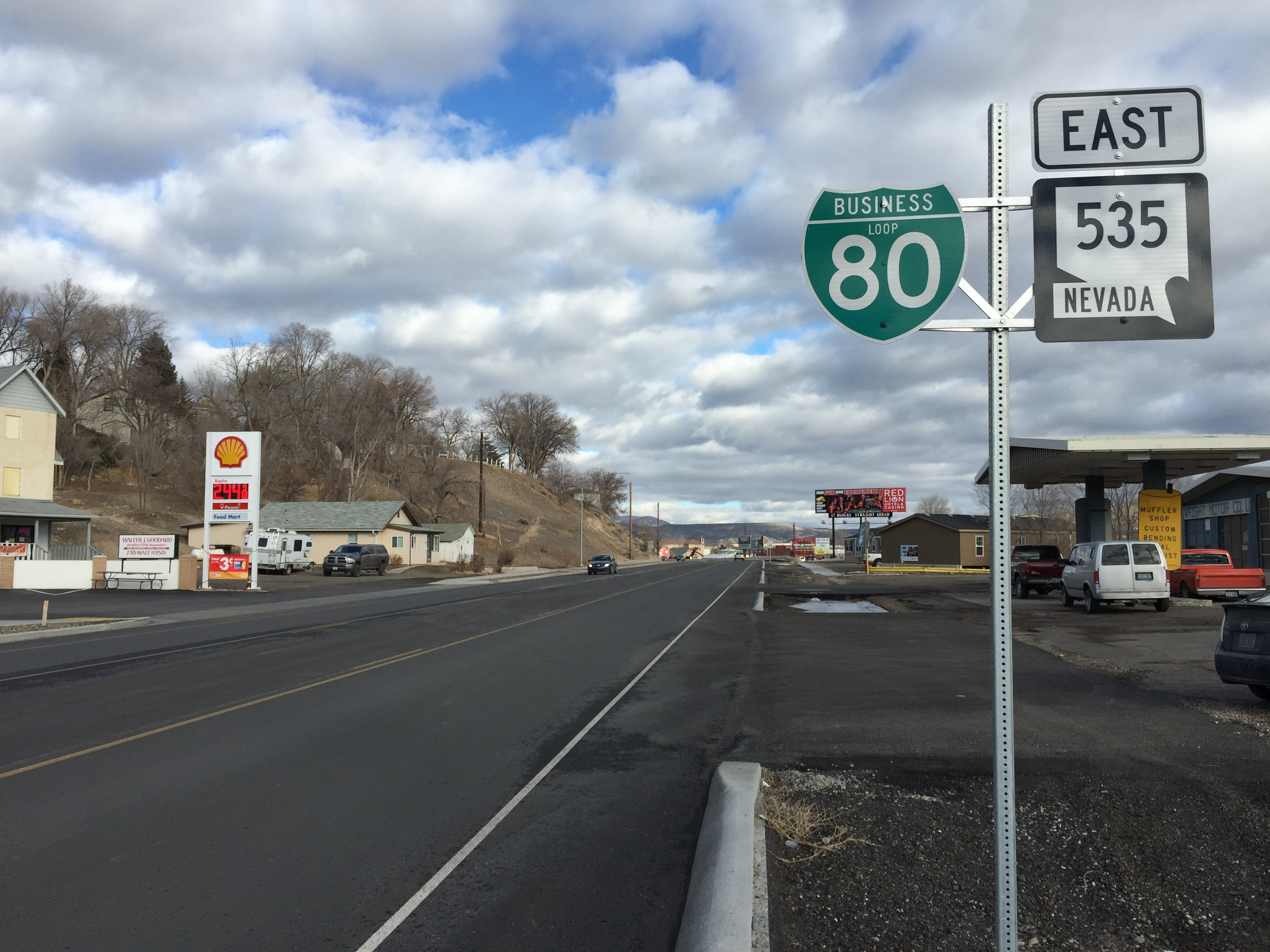
View east along Idaho Street (SR 535 and Interstate 80 Business) just east of SR 225.

Interstate 80 Business/SR 535 begins at the Elko West interchange (Exit 298) of Interstate 80 (I-80) southwest of the Elko city limits. The two routes travel to the east on Idaho Street and pass just south of Elko Regional Airport. The western segment of SR 535 ends after 2.408 miles (3.875 km) at the city limits of Elko, while the Interstate 80 Business designation continues east along Idaho Street. After a further 0.5 miles (0.805 km), the roadway reaches the southeastern corner of the airport, where there is an intersection with the southern terminus of SR 225 (Mountain City Highway). At this point, the eastern segment of SR 535 begins and continues east along Idaho Street with Interstate 80 Business a further 0.784 miles (1.262 km) into downtown Elko. In downtown Elko, the roadway has an intersection with the northern terminus of SR 227, where the eastern segment of SR 535 ends. However, Interstate 80 Business continues another 1.8 miles (2.897 km), at first continuing east along Idaho Street to East Jennings Way. At East Jennings Way, Interstate 80 Business turns to the northwest and quickly ends at I-80's Elko East interchange (Exit 303). The final section of the route along East Jennings Way is NDOT-maintained under designation FREL17 (Elko County Frontage Road 17).

SR 535 is not part of the National Highway System, a system of roadways important to the nation's economy, defense, and mobility.

== History ==
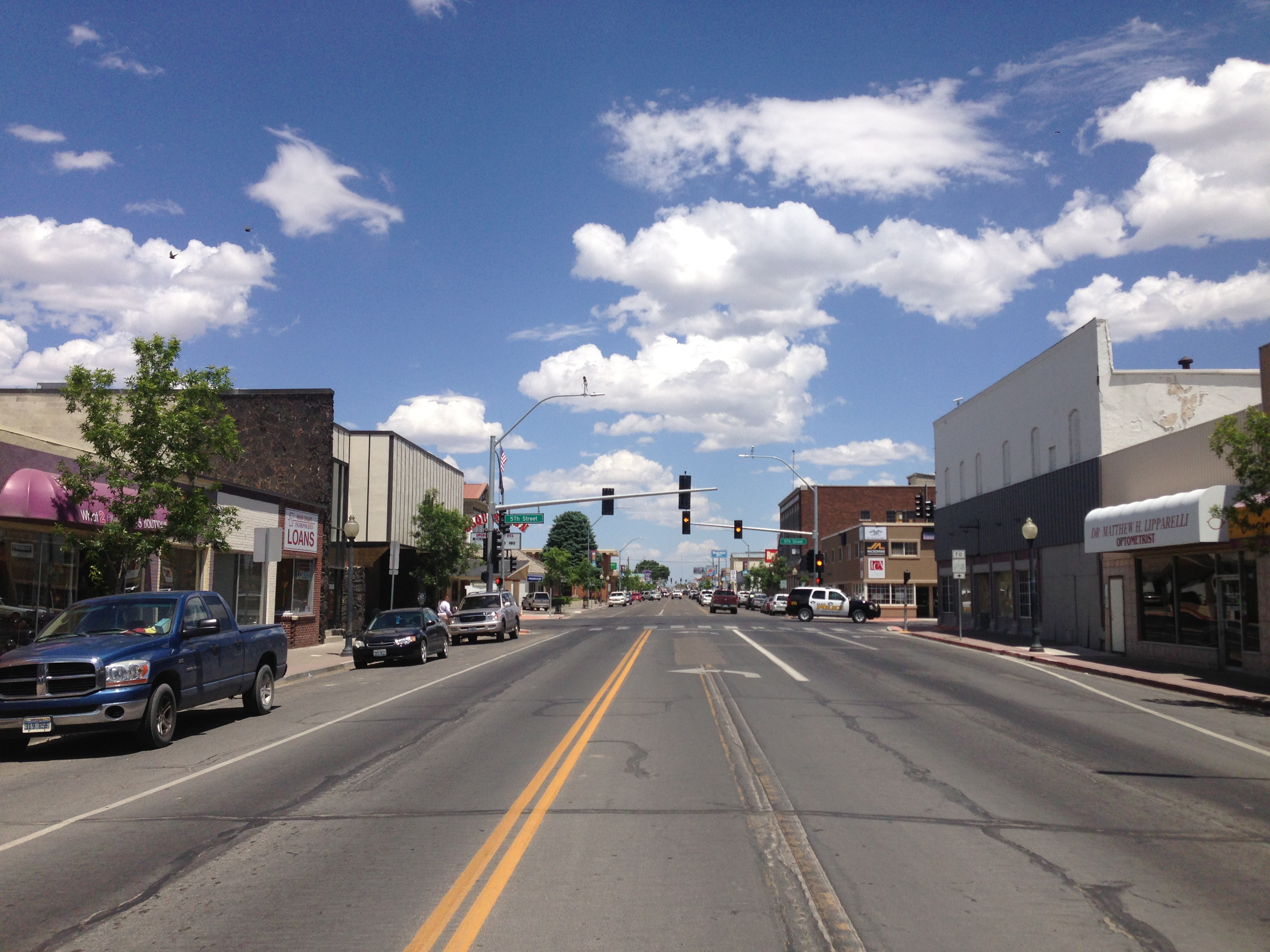
View eastbound along Idaho Street (Interstate 80 Business and SR 535) near 5th Street (SR 227) in downtown Elko.

Except for the small portion of the route at the east end named East Jennings Way, the entirety of Interstate 80 Business in Elko was originally Nevada State Route 1 and later U.S. Route 40. Interstate 80 was constructed as a bypass of downtown Elko around 1980, by which time U.S. 40 had been removed in favor of the interstate.

== Major intersections ==
The entire route is in Elko, Elko County.

mi	km	Destinations	Notes
0.0	0.0	I-80 – Reno, Salt Lake City I-80 BL begins	Western terminus of I-80 BL and western segment of SR 535; western end of I-80 BL concurrency; I-80, exit 298
2.4	3.9	SR 535 ends	Eastern terminus of western segment of SR 535; Elko city limits
2.9	4.7	SR 225 north (Mountain City Highway) – Owyhee SR 535 begins	Southern terminus of SR 225; western terminus of eastern segment of SR 535
3.7	6.0	SR 227 south (South 5th Street) – Spring Creek SR 535 ends	Northern terminus of SR 227; eastern terminus of eastern segment of SR 535
5.5	8.9	I-80 – Reno, Salt Lake City I-80 BL ends	Eastern terminus of I-80 BL; I-80, exit 303
1.000 mi = 1.609 km; 1.000 km = 0.621 mi: Concurrency terminus
