= Elko Mountain =

Mountain in Nevada, United States

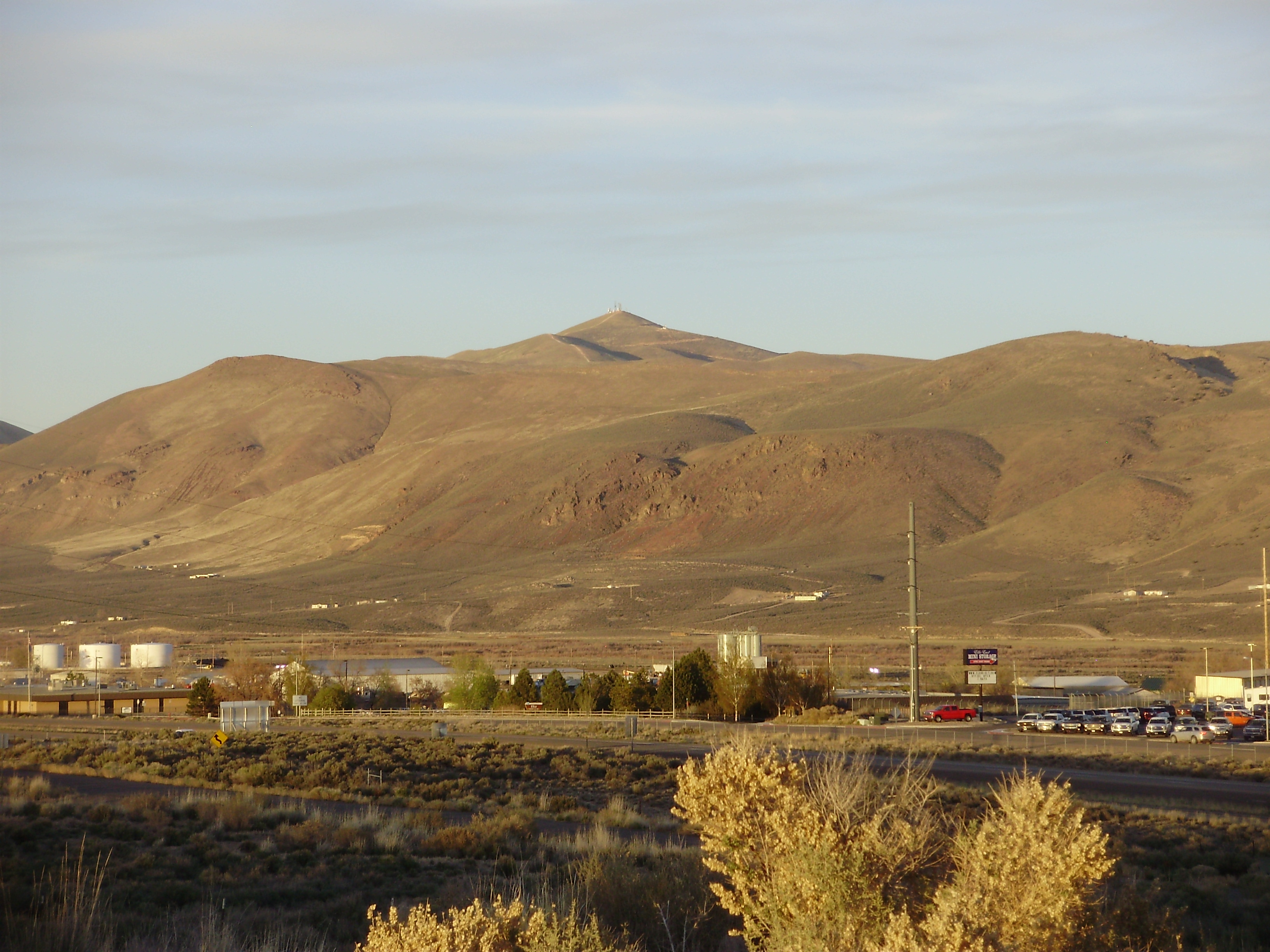
- Elko Mountain viewed from Elko

Highest point
- Elevation: 7,510 ft (2,289 m) NAVD 88
- Prominence: 2,085 ft (636 m)
- Coordinates: 40°53′40″N 115°37′49″W

Geography
- Location within Nevada
- Location: Elko County, Nevada, U.S.
- Parent range: Elko Hills
- Topo map: OSINO

Climbing
- Easiest route: A dirt road leads northwest from Boyd-Kennedy Road (Elko County Route 711) to radio facilities on the summit

Elko Mountain is the tallest mountain in the Elko Hills of Elko County, in Nevada, United States. The summit contains several radio towers.

== Summit panorama ==
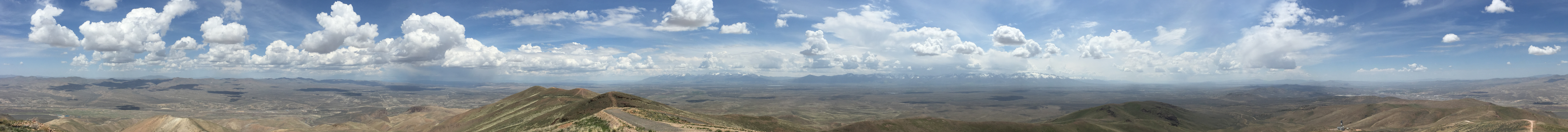
360-degree panorama from the summit of Elko Mountain
