= East Peak (Elko County, Nevada) =

Mountain in Elko County, Nevada, United States

Coordinates: 40°54′44″N 115°34′58″W

East Peak is a summit in Elko County in the U.S. state of Nevada. The elevation is 6,194 feet (1,888 m). The peak rises above the Humboldt River valley and the community of Ryndon about two miles to the north and the main peak of Elko Mountain is about two miles to the west-southwest.

East Peak was named for the fact is east of other nearby summits.
