= Ruby Valley Pony Express Station =

- U.S. National Register of Historic Places
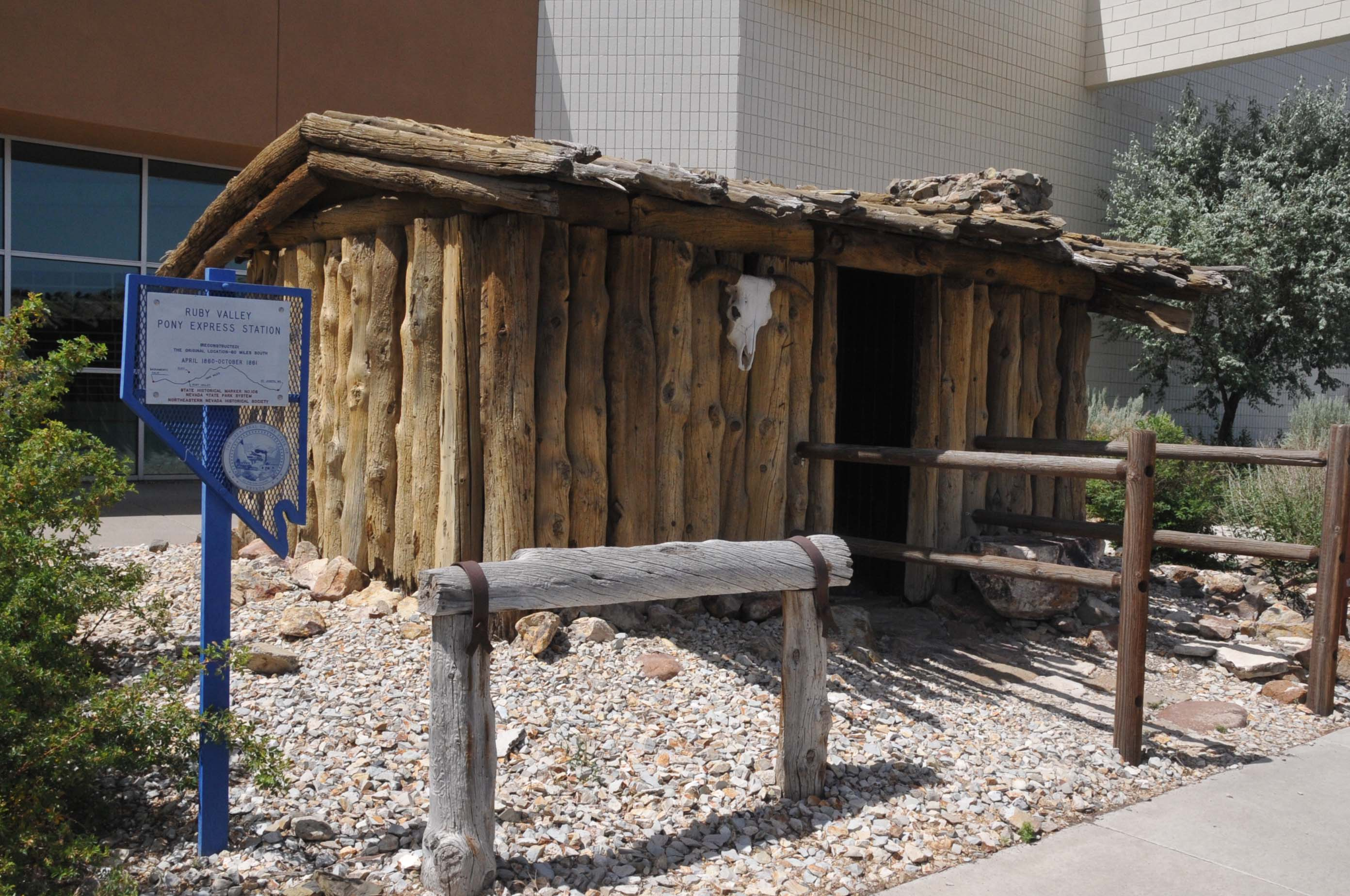

- Location within Nevada Location within the United States
- Location: 1515 Idaho St., Elko, Nevada
- Coordinates: 40°50′33″N 115°45′4″W
- Area: 1 acre (0.40 ha)
- Built: 1860
- NRHP reference No.: 75001110
- Added to NRHP: March 10, 1975

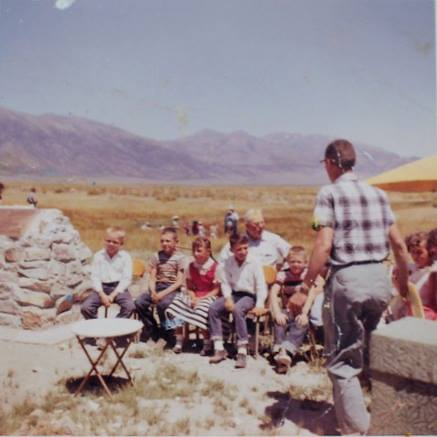
Dedication of the monument at Ruby Valley Station. Earl Warren in the background.

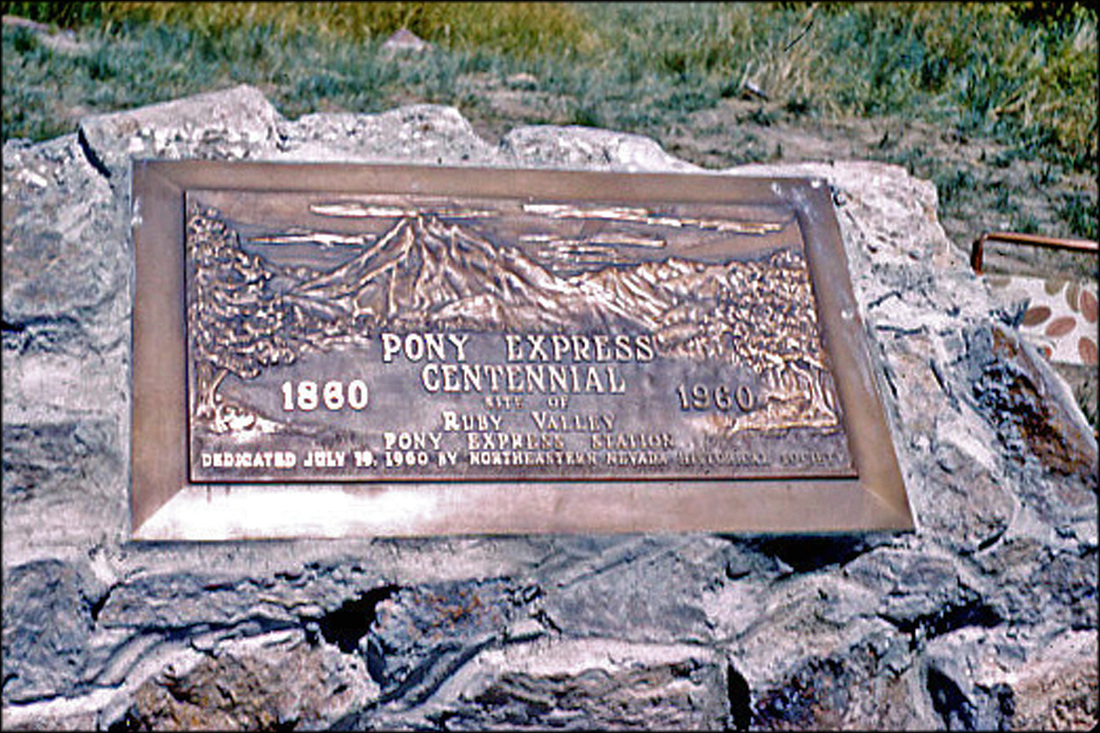
Brass plaque placed at the dedication site

The Ruby Valley Pony Express Station, located at 1515 Idaho St. in Elko, Nevada, was built in 1860 in Ruby Valley, Nevada. It was moved in 1960 approximately 60 miles (97 km) to Elko, during the centennial anniversary year for the Pony Express, and then restored, and is listed on the National Register of Historic Places. The building is significant as one of only two surviving Pony Express buildings in Nevada, out of 43 stations in Nevada.

The building was used as Pony Express stop during April 1860 to October 1861, and before and after that was used as a stagecoach stop. It was located on the Raymond and Sally Gardner Ranch in Ruby Valley. It is an 11-by-18-foot (3.4 m × 5.5 m) log building with a stone fireplace; sod originally covered its roof. In its move, all logs and stones were numbered and charted so that it could be reconstructed in Elko in pretty much unaltered form.

It was listed on the National Register of Historic Places in 1975.

The original Ruby Valley Pony Express station was located at Station Spring at the southern end of Ruby Valley. Ruby Lake NWR has extended its southern boundary to include Fort Ruby and this Pony Express Station. A Historical Marker was placed at the site, and Dedication occurred July 19, 1960. Supreme Court Justice Earl Warren attended as guest speaker, attendees were local residents and the student body of Cave Creek School.
