= Maggie Summit =

Mountain in Nevada, United States

Coordinates: 41.6760150°N 116.0495357°W

Maggie Summit is a summit in the U.S. state of Nevada. The elevation is 6,640 feet (2,020 m).

Maggie Summit takes its name from nearby Maggie Creek.
