= Ruby Lake National Wildlife Refuge =

Wildlife refuge in Nevada, US

- IUCN category IV (habitat/species management area)
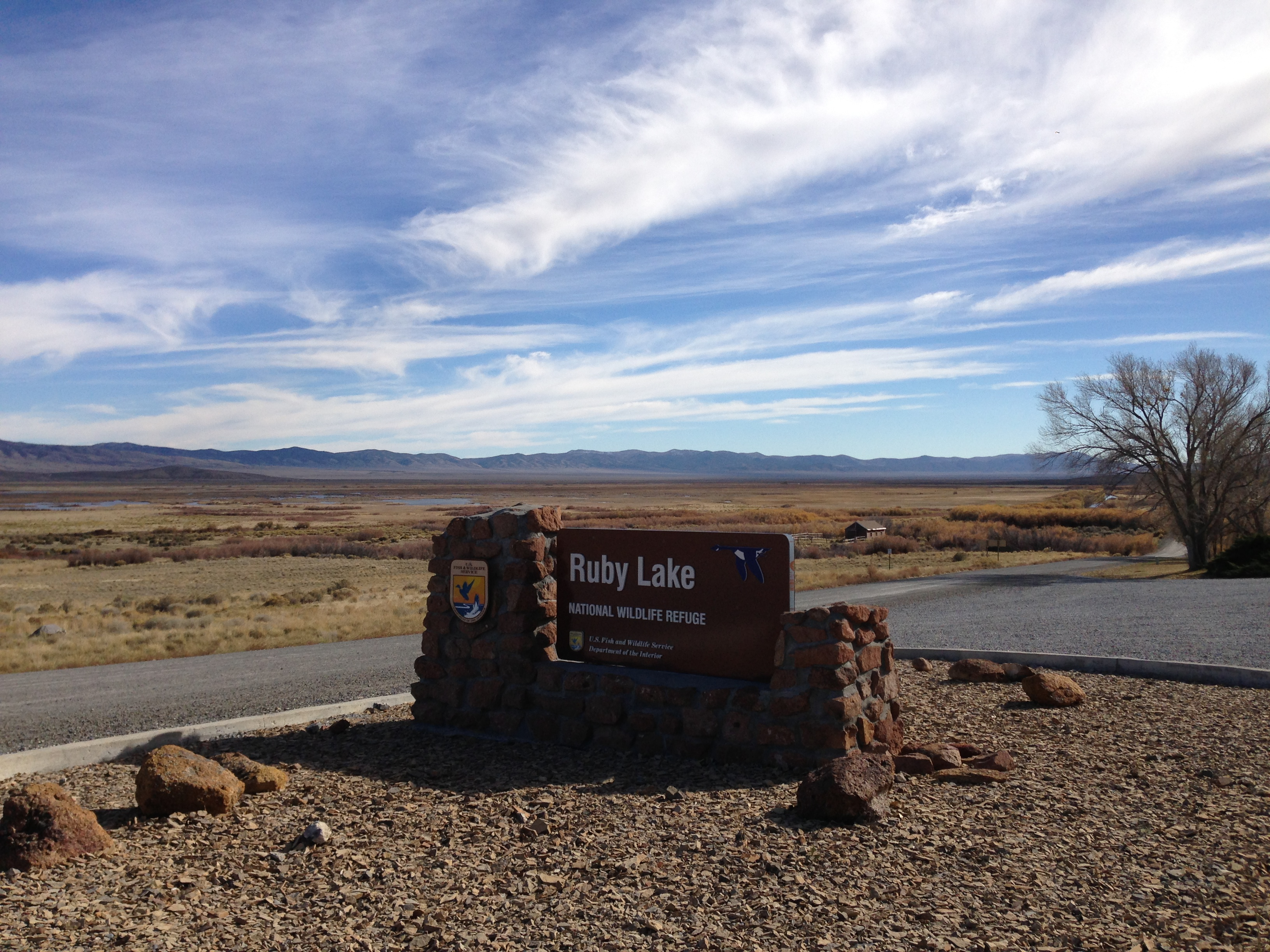

- Location within the United States Location within Nevada
- Location: Elko County, White Pine County, Nevada, United States
- Coordinates: 40°12′07″N 115°29′35″W
- Area: 39,928 acres (161.58 km^{2})
- Established: 1938
- Governing body: U.S. Fish and Wildlife Service
- Website: Ruby Lake National Wildlife Refuge

The Ruby Lake National Wildlife Refuge is located in southwestern Elko County and adjacent northwestern White Pine County in the remote Great Basin area of the northeastern section of the state of Nevada in the Western United States. Established in 1938, near the end of the Great Depression of the 1930s, under the presidential administration of 32nd President Franklin D. Roosevelt (1882-1945, served 1933-1945), as of 2023 it encompasses 39,928 acres (161.58 km^{2}) of wetlands in Ruby Valley, just east of the Ruby Mountains and just south of Harrison Pass. It is 16 miles (26 km) long, up to 3 miles (4.8 km) in width, and lies at an elevation of 6,000 feet (1,800 m). Once the bed of an ancient 200-foot (61 m) deep lake, it is now a network of spring-fed marshes and shallow ponds serving as a habitat for hundreds of species of native and migratory birds and mammals.

The Refuge is administered by the U.S. Fish and Wildlife Service, a longtime agency unit of the United States Department of the Interior. A Visitor Center (located at 40°12′08″N 115°29′34″W) and auto-tour route allow for discreet viewing of waterfowl.

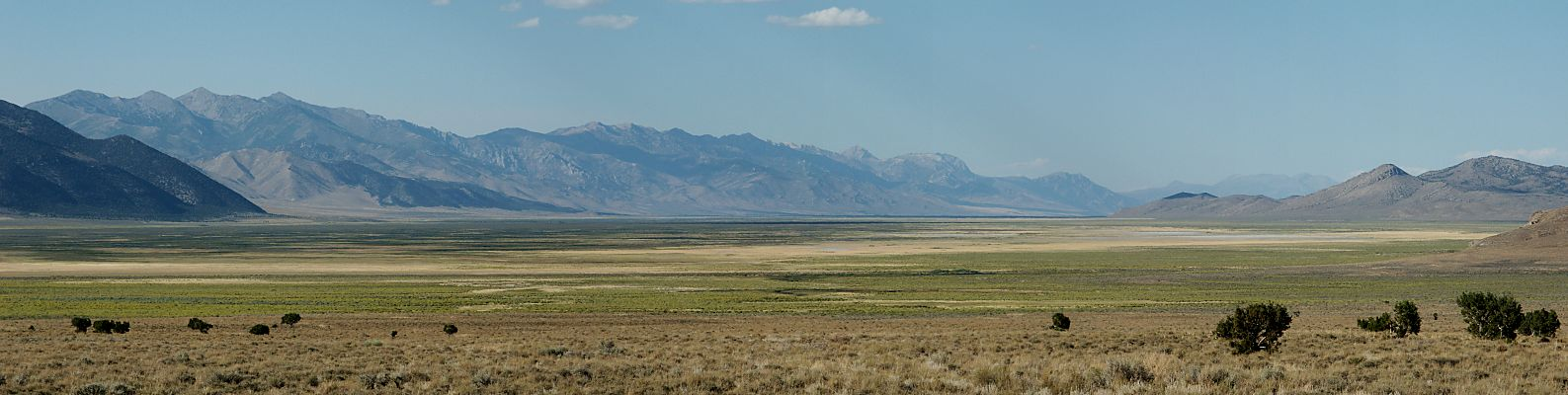
Ruby Valley, looking north from near Overland Pass. The Ruby Lake National Wildlife Refuge in northeastern Nevada is the dark geen area in the valley floor at left.

== Ruby Marsh ==
Ruby Marsh is a wetlands area within the national refuge, which serves as a nesting area for "the greater sandhill crane and trumpeter swan". In 1972, Ruby Marsh, which is located within the Ruby Lake National Wildlife Refuge, was designated as a National Natural Landmark by the National Park Service of the United States Department of the Interior.
