= Ruby Valley =

Basin in Nevada, United States

Coordinates: 40.400°N 115.300°W

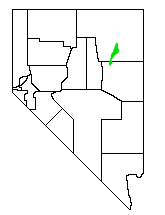
Location of Ruby Valley within Nevada

Ruby Valley is a large basin located in south-central Elko and northern White Pine counties in the northeastern section of the state of Nevada in the western United States. From Secret Pass it runs south-southwest for approximately 60 miles (96 km) to Overland Pass. To the west is the steep escarpment of the Ruby Mountains, and to the north is the East Humboldt Range and Clover Valley. The east side of the valley is less well defined, but its maximum width is about 10 miles (16 km) near Franklin Lake. At its south end lies the Ruby Lake National Wildlife Refuge. The valley includes a series of hot springs, known as Ruby Valley Hot Springs, with multiple pools reaching up to 30 feet in diameter and 100 degrees Fahrenheit in temperature.

SR 229 passes along the northeast edge of the valley, and Ruby Valley Road (SR 767 and CR 788) runs along its western edge. Harrison Pass Road (CR 718) crosses the Ruby Mountains near the center of the valley. Much of the floor of Ruby Valley lies at elevations near 6000 feet (1820 m).

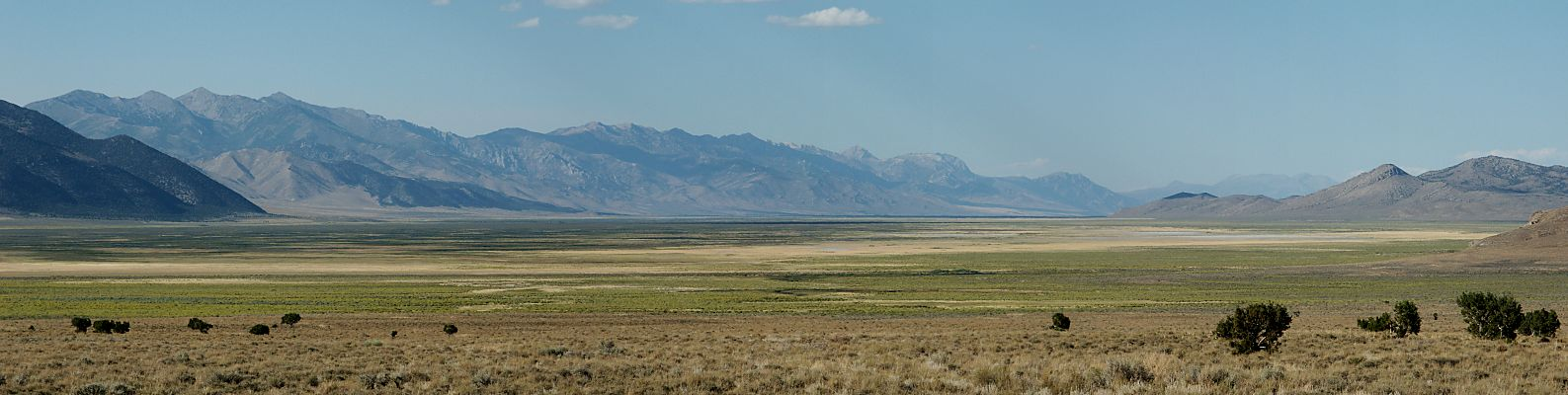
Ruby Valley, looking north from near Overland Pass

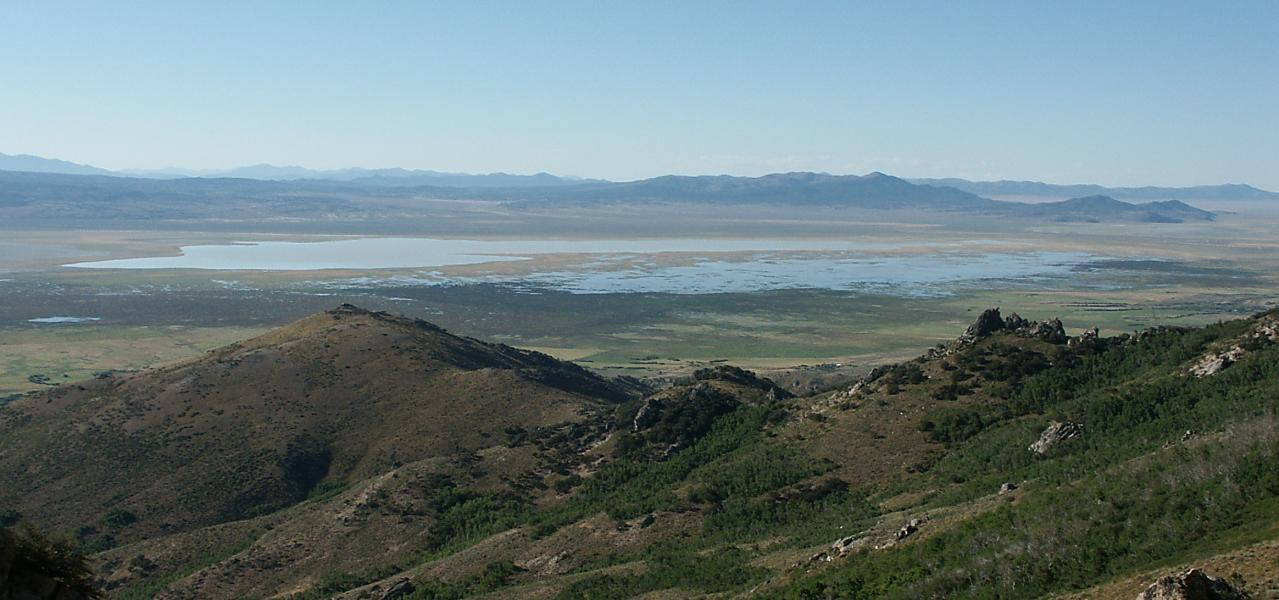
Franklin Lake in Ruby Valley, looking southeast

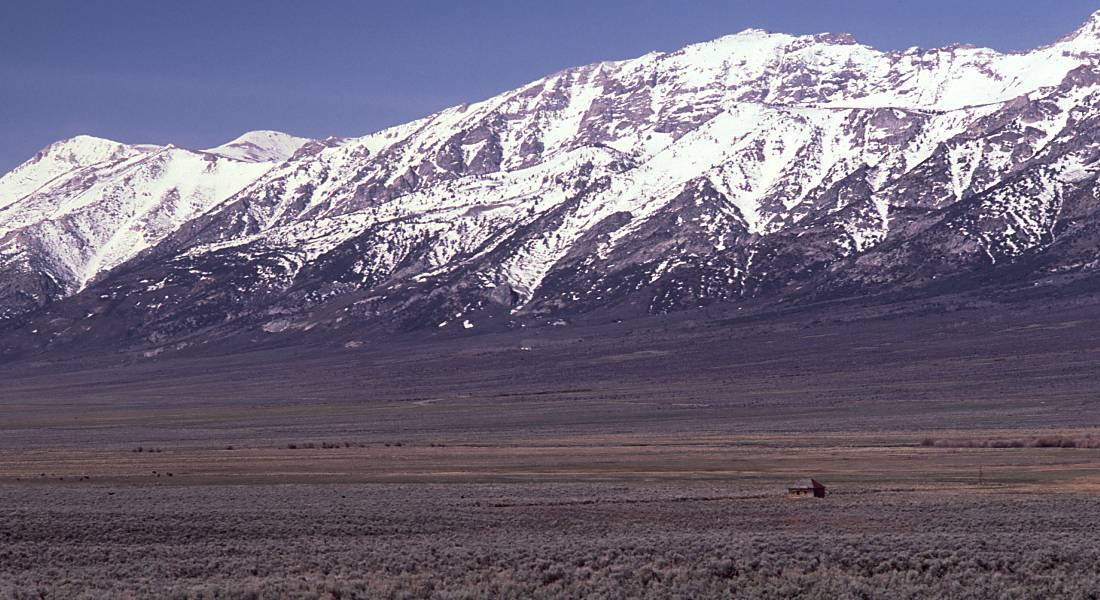
North Ruby Valley, and the eastern escarpment of the Ruby Mountains

The valley played an important role in the history of the Great Basin. Nomadic tribes of the Shoshone nation used Ruby Valley as a winter home, finding it warmer than nearby locations. The California Trail, active after the 1840s, was located just to the north. The Donner Party passed through the southern end of the valley in 1846, heading for the Overland Pass route across the Ruby Mountains – part of the Hastings Cutoff.

Overland Pass was also the site of much activity in the 1860s. A transportation route through central Nevada had been scouted by Howard Egan in 1855, and then surveyed by Captain James H. Simpson for the U.S. Army in 1859. Simpson established a trading post at the south end of Ruby Valley, and George Chorpenning built a way station there for his mail and stagecoach line in 1860. The Pony Express and its successor, the Transcontinental Telegraph, also ran through Overland Pass.

In September 1862, the U.S. Government established Fort Ruby at the east entrance to the pass to protect the passage of settlers and these important communication connections with residents of California during the war years. In 1863 it signed the Treaty of Ruby Valley with the Western Shoshone, which authorized access but did not cede any land.

After the American Civil War, John Warren Butterfield and Wells Fargo & Co continued transport service across the West. Around 1866, Wells Fargo began to develop agriculture in the Ruby Valley to help support its way stations.

However, in the late 1860s, the first transcontinental railroad was routed well to the north, and Overland Pass fell into disuse. Fort Ruby was closed in September 1869, seven years after it was built.

In the late 20th century, the old Pony Express Station was moved and restored. It is now part of a display at the Northeastern Nevada Museum in Elko. Population in the valley has declined, and the lands are principally used in large ranching and farming operations to raise cattle and to grow alfalfa.
