= Rowland, Nevada =

- Ghost Town
- Location of Rowland Rowland (the United States)
- Coordinates: 41°56′12″N 115°40′43″W
- Country: United States
- State: Nevada
- County: Elko
- Elevation: 4,924 ft (1,501 m)
- Time zone: UTC-8 (Pacific (PST))
  - Summer (DST): UTC-7 (PDT)
- GNIS feature ID: 861195

Rowland is a ghost town in northern Elko County, Nevada, United States.

== Description ==
The site of the former community is located along the Bruneau River in Bruneau Canyon in what is now the Humboldt–Toiyabe National Forest.

== History ==
Rowland was established in 1880s as a ranching community and never found quality ore. The community was named after Rowland Gill, a local rancher. A post office was established at Rowland in 1900. There were services such as a store, and a saloon. The post office closed in November 1942 and was the end of the community. A number of buildings from the early years remain including Scott's store and saloon and an old warehouse.

The population was 7 in 1940.

== See also ==
- List of ghost towns in Nevada
