= Elko Hills =

Mountain range in Nevada, United States

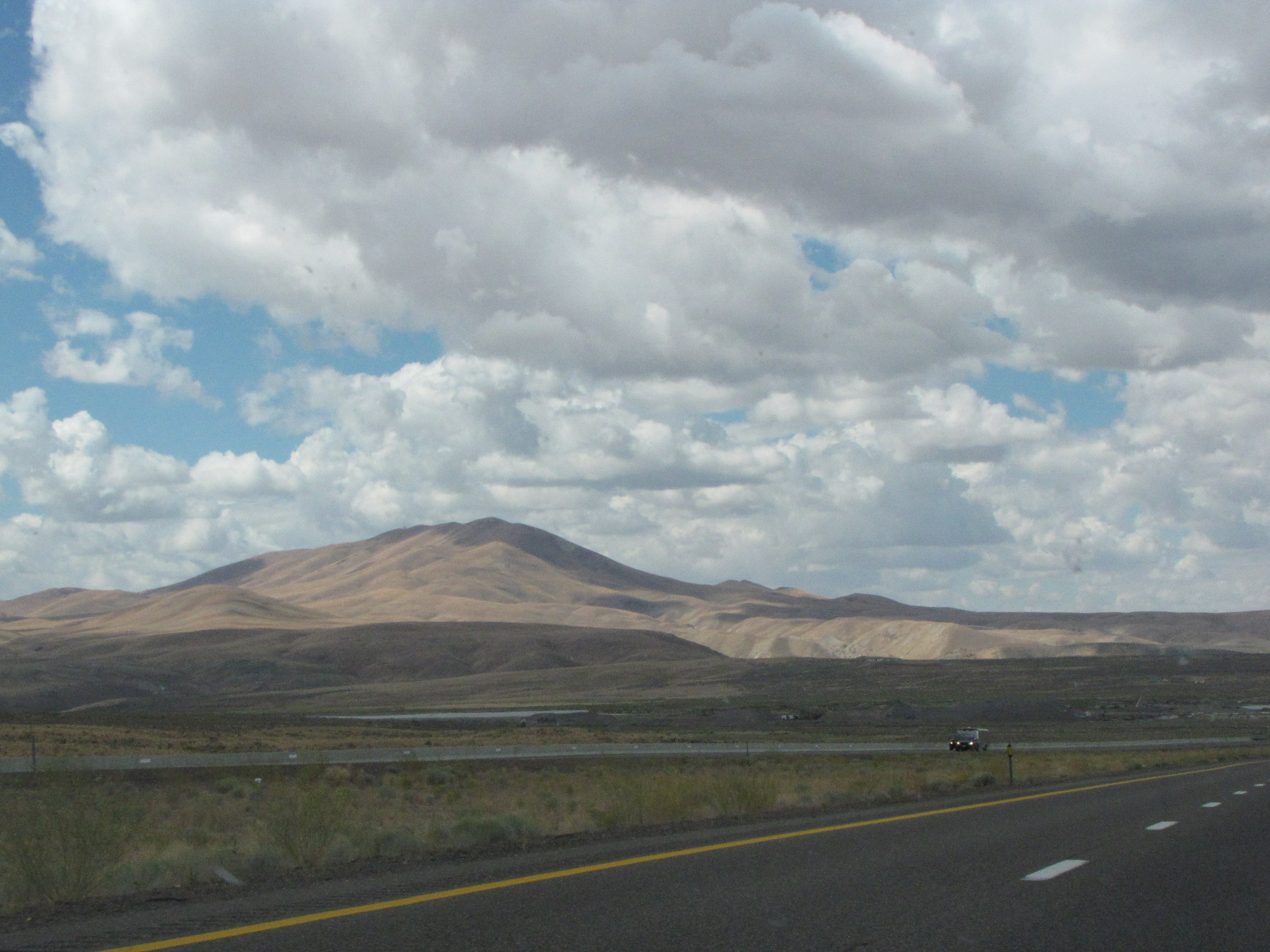

Highest point
- Peak: Elko Mountain
- Elevation: 2,289 m (7,510 ft)

Geography
- Location within Nevada
- Country: United States
- State: Nevada
- District: Elko County
- Range coordinates: 40°49′24.720″N 115°42′11.237″W
- Topo map: USGS Elko East

The Elko Hills are a mountain range in Elko County, in the northeastern section of the state of Nevada in the Great Basin region of the western United States. Elko Mountain, the range high-point, and Grindstone Mountain are the range's only named summits.

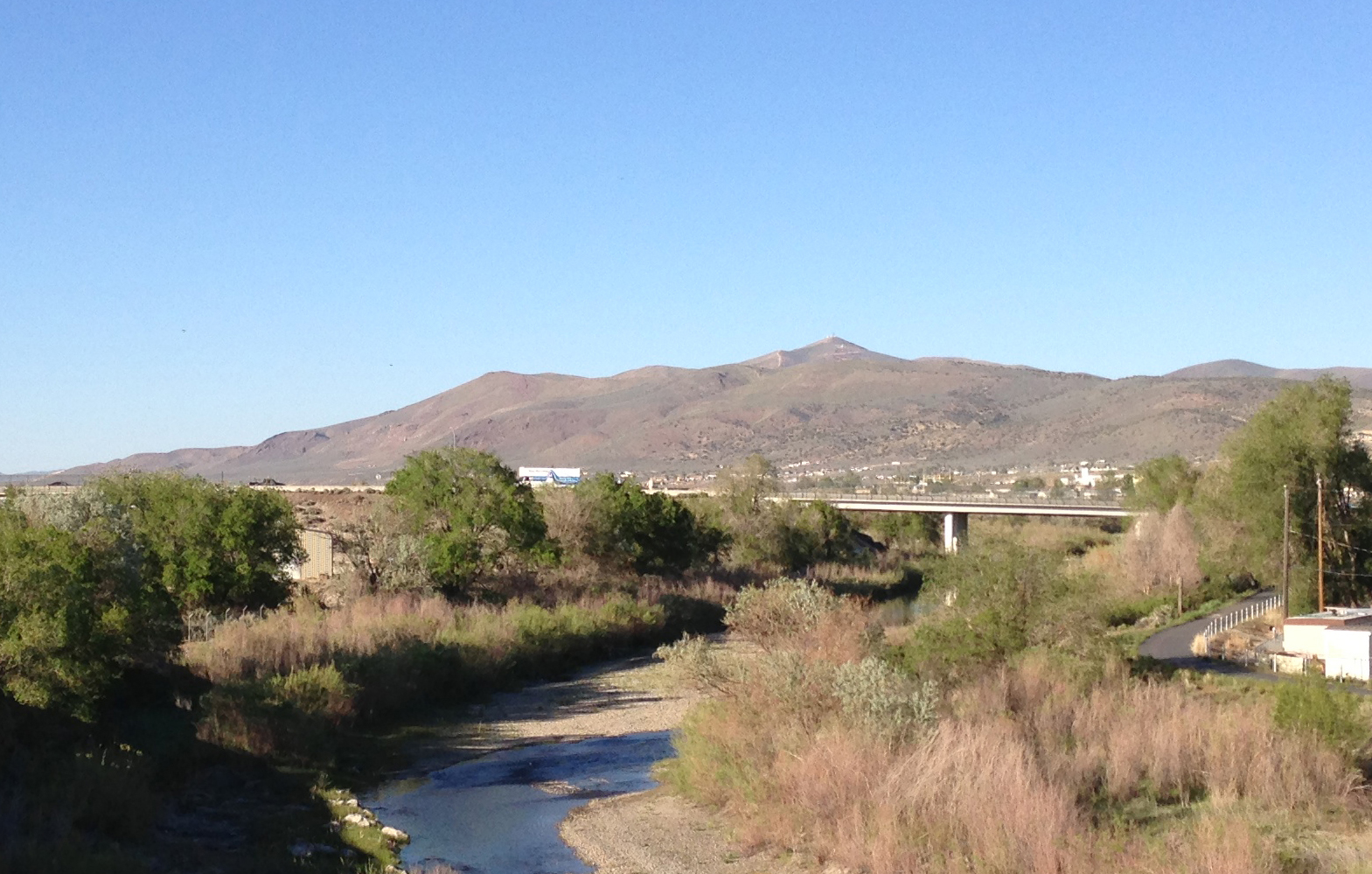
Elko Mountain viewed from downtown Elko, Nevada, with the Humboldt River in the foreground
