= Nevada State Route 229 =

State highway in Nevada, United States

State Route 229
- Halleck and Secret Pass Road

Route information
- Maintained by NDOT
- Length: 50.360 mi (81.047 km)
- Existed: 1976–present

Major junctions
- West end: I-80 at Halleck
- East end: US 93 south of Wells

Location
- Country: United States
- State: Nevada

Highway system
- Nevada State Highway System; Interstate; US; State; Pre‑1976; Scenic
← SR 228	→ SR 230

State Route 229 (SR 229) is a state highway in Elko County, Nevada, United States. It is a routing from Interstate 80 around Halleck, heading south through Secret Pass, to where it meets Ruby Valley Road (State Route 767). From there it heads northeast to U.S. Route 93.

== History ==
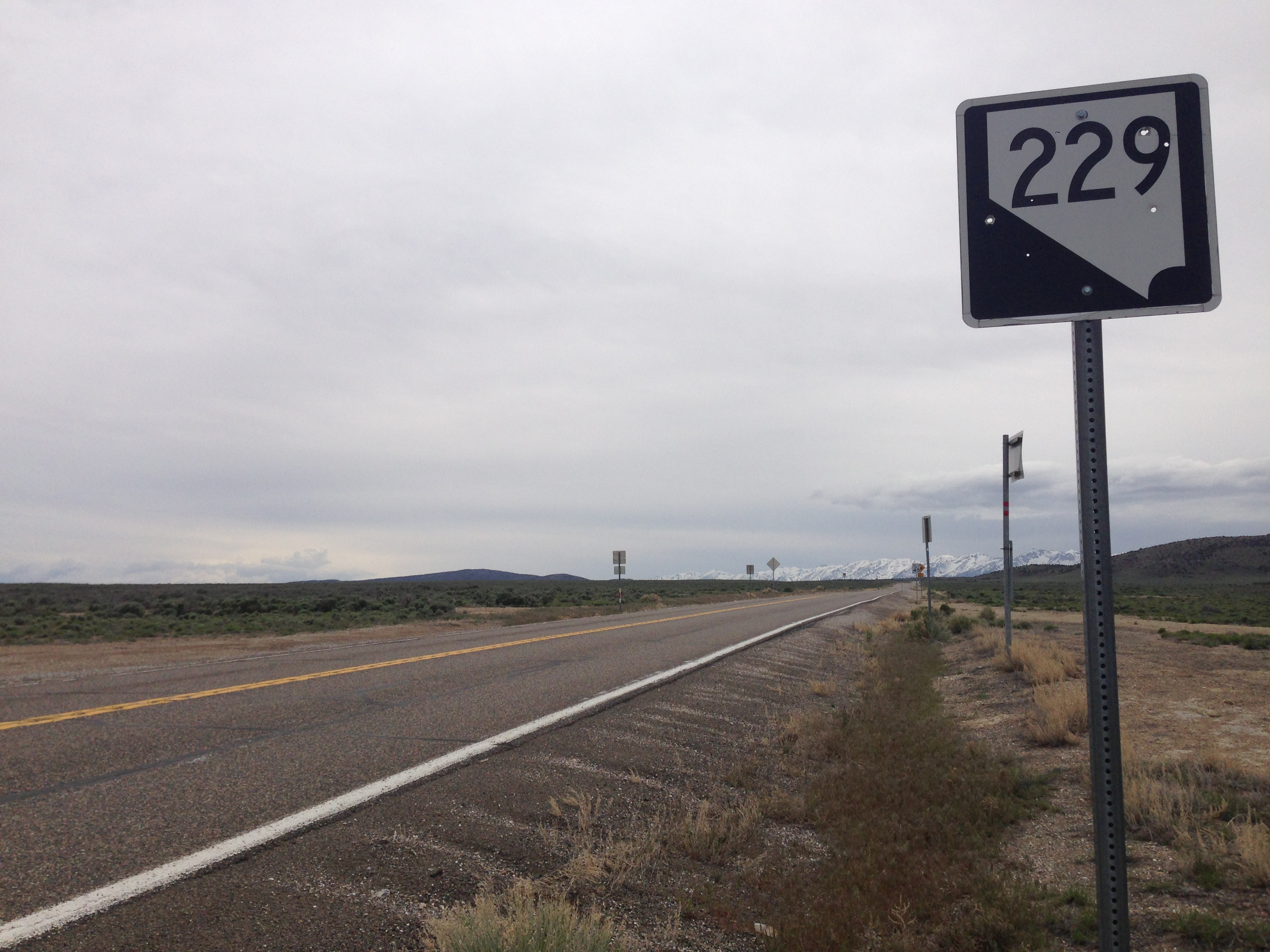
First westbound reassurance shield near the east end of SR 229

The southeastern portion of SR 229, between the junction of SR 767 and it eastern terminus at US 93, follows the alignment of the Hastings Cutoff, a route which at the time was thought to be a more direct route of the California Trail through the northeastern part of Nevada.

Prior to 1976, SR 229 comprised a portion of State Route 11.

== Major intersections ==
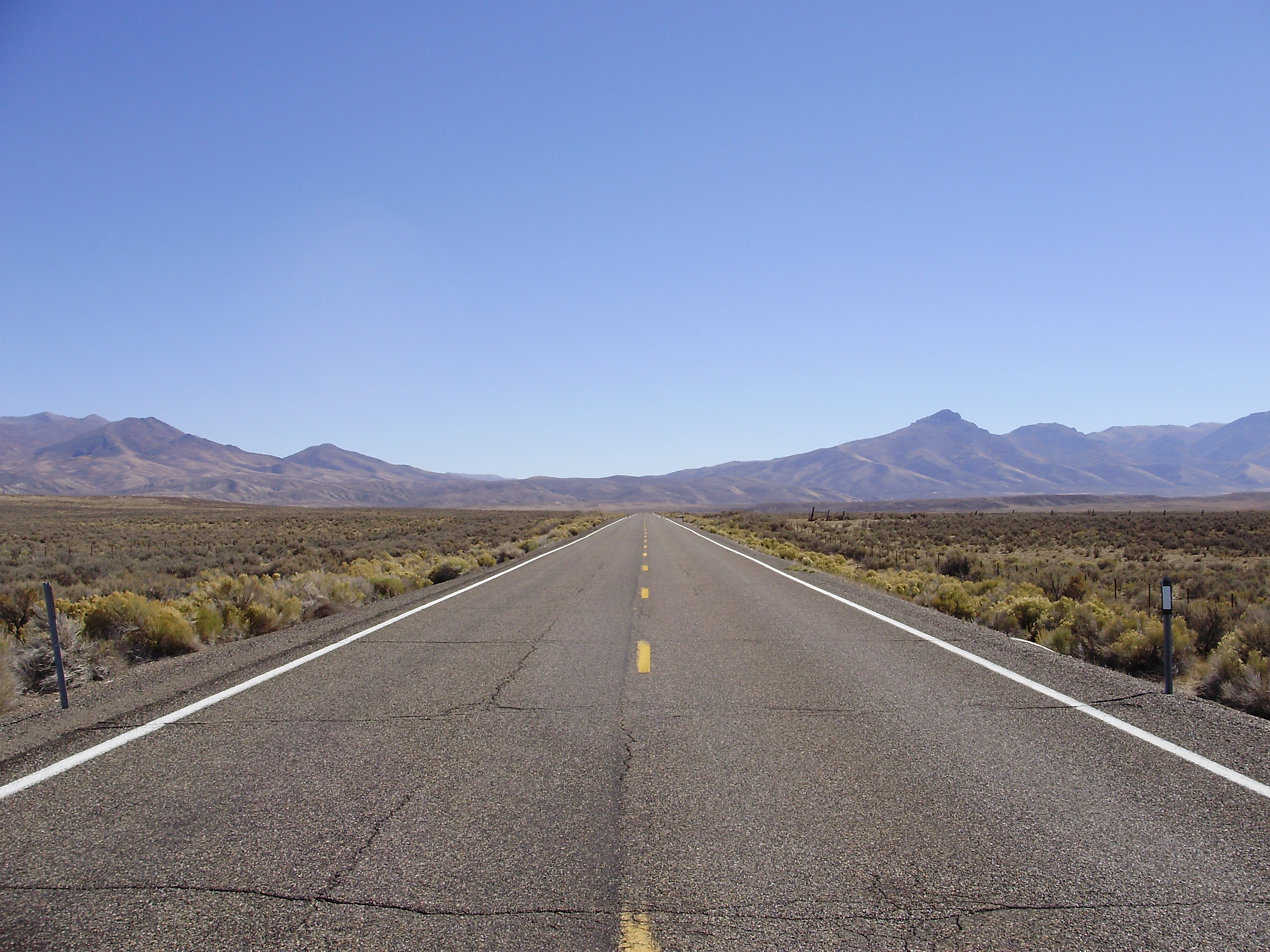
View along eastbound SR 229 heading toward Secret Pass

The entire route is in Elko County.

Location	mi	km	Destinations	Notes
Halleck			I-80 – Elko, Wells	
			SR 767 (Ruby Valley Road)	
			US 93 – Ely, Wells	
1.000 mi = 1.609 km; 1.000 km = 0.621 mi

== See also ==
- List of state highways in Nevada
