= Halleck, Nevada =

Unincorporated community in Elko County, Nevada, United States

- Unincorporated community
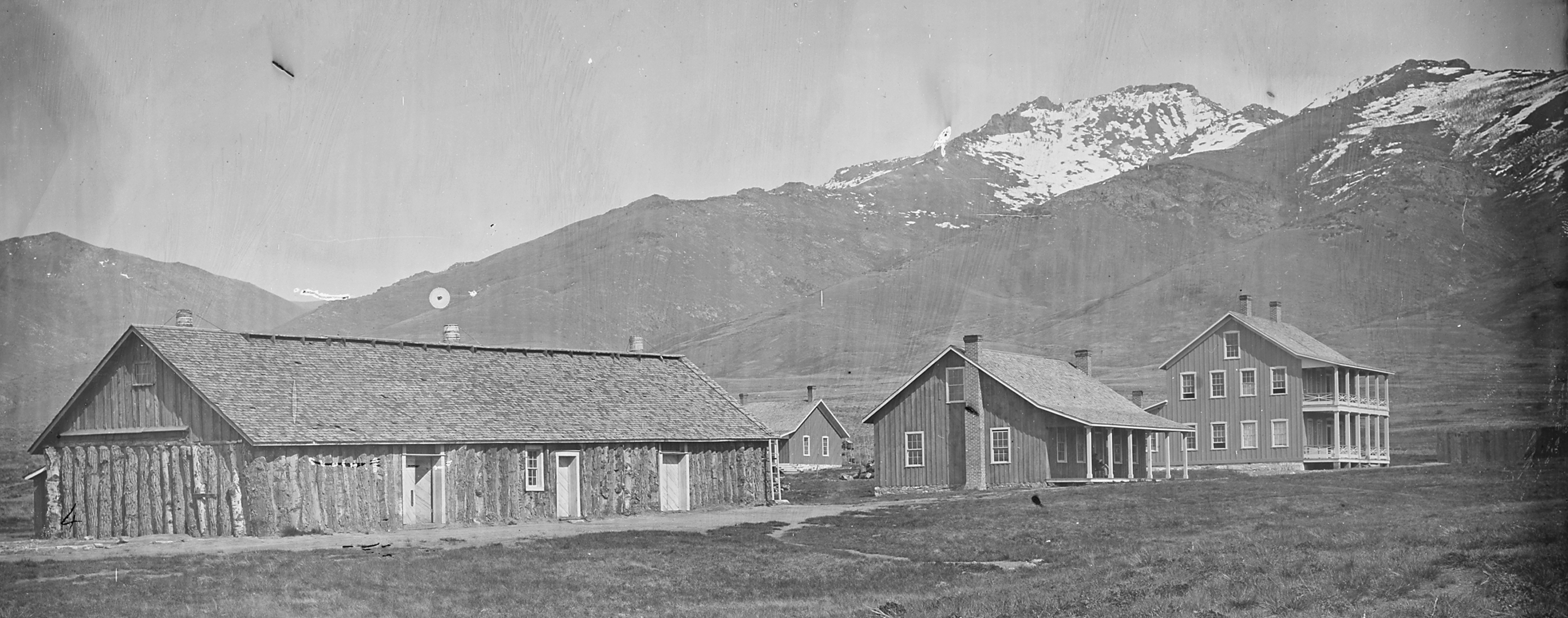
- Camp Halleck in 1871

- Location within the state of Nevada
- Coordinates: 40°57′3″N 115°27′10″W
- Country: United States
- State: Nevada
- County: Elko
- Elevation: 5,230 ft (1,590 m)
- Time zone: UTC-8 (Pacific (PST))
  - Summer (DST): UTC-7 (PDT)
- ZIP codes: 89824
- GNIS feature ID: 845498

Nevada Historical Marker
- Official name: Fort Halleck Site (1867-1886)
- Reference no.: 47

Halleck is an unincorporated community in central Elko County, Nevada, United States.

== Geography ==
Halleck lies at the interchange of Interstate 80 and State Route 229 northeast of the city of Elko. Its elevation is 5,230 feet (1,590 m). The community is part of the Elko Micropolitan Statistical Area.

Halleck has a post office with the ZIP code 89824. The post office was established April 24, 1873.

== History ==
The community's name originates from Camp Halleck, established July 26, 1867 (1867-1879) by the U.S. Army, to protect the California Trail and the construction workers of the Central Pacific Railroad. It was named for Major General Henry Wager Halleck. It then became Fort Halleck (1879-1886).

Halleck came into being in 1869 when the Central Pacific Railroad was completed through the future townsite that immediately became the shipping point for supplies destined for Fort Halleck. During 1869, the town had erected two hotels and one saloon. The saloon catered to soldiers stationed at Fort Halleck. A store and a school were opened in 1874. The school remained open until the 1950s. By 1875, the population had grown to fifty and by 1900 had risen to 126.

At the time Halleck had twenty-six buildings and numerous businesses flourished. However, with the abandonment of Fort Halleck in 1886, the town had to rely on ranching and ranchers to survive. But the town was slowly dying as small ranches were bought by larger properties and combined into corporate operations. The Halleck post office continues to operate from one of the two remaining buildings in town as it serves the many local ranches.
