= Jiggs, Nevada =

Unincorporated community in Nevada, US

- Unincorporated community
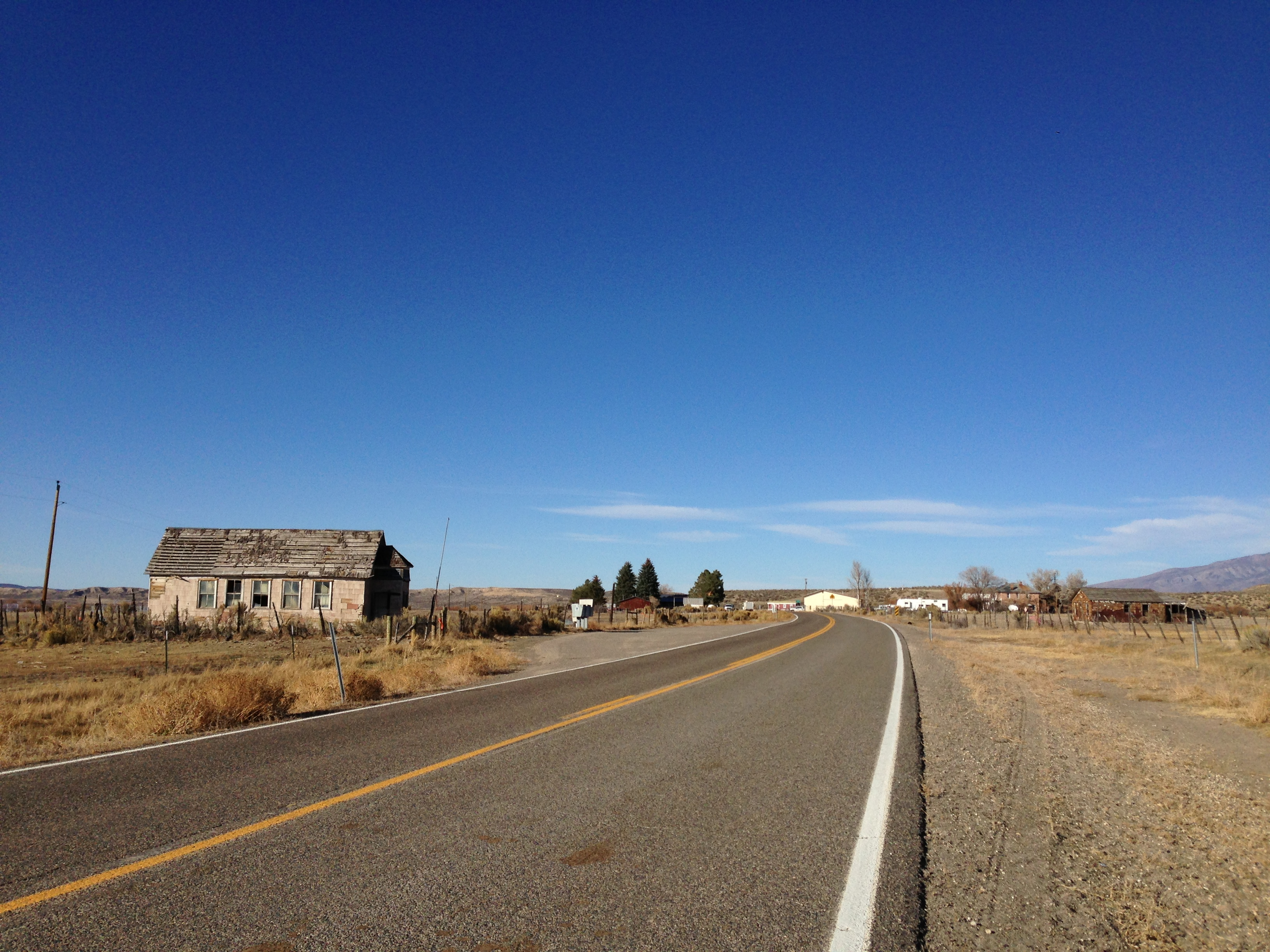

- Location within the state of Nevada
- Coordinates: 40°25′33″N 115°39′55″W
- Country: United States
- State: Nevada
- County: Elko
- Elevation: 5,486 ft (1,672 m)

Population (2000)
  - Total: 2
- Time zone: UTC-8 (Pacific (PST))
  - Summer (DST): UTC-7 (PDT)
- GNIS feature ID: 845520

Jiggs is an unincorporated community in Elko County, Nevada, United States, in the Mound Valley at the south end of State Route 228.

The community is part of the Elko Micropolitan Statistical Area. Jiggs is located at the southwestern foothills of the extensive Ruby Mountains; the community is about 30 miles (48 km) south of Elko.

== History ==
The site was formerly a year-round camp for Native Americans gathering pine nuts.

Prior names for the settlement had been Mound Valley, Skelton, and Hylton—unfortunately, all at the same time. Since no one could seem to agree on a name, postal authorities chose a new name from a list submitted by local ranchers for the new post office to be established December 18, 1918. One of the names was Jiggs, a character in the Bringing Up Father comic strip, who was always bickering with his wife Maggie.

The town was the headquarters for "King Fisher", a fictional character created by author Zane Grey.

The town was featured in a 1965 Volkswagen advertising campaign in which the entire population (5 adults, 4 children and a dog) was shown comfortably seated inside a VW Bus.

== Climate ==
Climate data for Jiggs, Nevada (1991–2020 normals, extremes 1978–present)
Month	Jan	Feb	Mar	Apr	May	Jun	Jul	Aug	Sep	Oct	Nov	Dec	Year
Record high °F (°C)	62 (17)	66 (19)	75 (24)	84 (29)	94 (34)	99 (37)	102 (39)	101 (38)	101 (38)	85 (29)	76 (24)	68 (20)	102 (39)
Mean daily maximum °F (°C)	40.4 (4.7)	43.5 (6.4)	52.0 (11.1)	58.3 (14.6)	67.8 (19.9)	78.9 (26.1)	88.3 (31.3)	87.3 (30.7)	77.7 (25.4)	64.6 (18.1)	51.0 (10.6)	40.2 (4.6)	62.5 (16.9)
Daily mean °F (°C)	27.7 (−2.4)	30.6 (−0.8)	37.2 (2.9)	42.8 (6.0)	51.3 (10.7)	59.8 (15.4)	68.5 (20.3)	67.2 (19.6)	58.3 (14.6)	46.8 (8.2)	36.2 (2.3)	27.0 (−2.8)	46.1 (7.8)
Mean daily minimum °F (°C)	15.0 (−9.4)	17.7 (−7.9)	22.4 (−5.3)	27.4 (−2.6)	34.7 (1.5)	40.7 (4.8)	48.6 (9.2)	47.1 (8.4)	38.9 (3.8)	29.1 (−1.6)	21.4 (−5.9)	13.8 (−10.1)	29.7 (−1.3)
Record low °F (°C)	−24 (−31)	−31 (−35)	−19 (−28)	−3 (−19)	8 (−13)	19 (−7)	21 (−6)	26 (−3)	11 (−12)	−6 (−21)	−17 (−27)	−29 (−34)	−31 (−35)
Average precipitation inches (mm)	1.28 (33)	0.98 (25)	1.37 (35)	1.86 (47)	1.93 (49)	0.82 (21)	0.35 (8.9)	0.49 (12)	0.73 (19)	1.04 (26)	0.92 (23)	1.05 (27)	12.82 (326)
Average snowfall inches (cm)	11.5 (29)	8.5 (22)	11.3 (29)	7.2 (18)	1.1 (2.8)	0.1 (0.25)	0.0 (0.0)	0.0 (0.0)	0.1 (0.25)	0.4 (1.0)	1.9 (4.8)	9.6 (24)	51.7 (131)
Average precipitation days (≥ 0.01 in)	5.4	4.2	4.5	6.2	6.0	3.2	2.2	2.3	2.6	3.0	2.9	4.4	46.9
Average snowy days (≥ 0.1 in)	3.4	2.4	2.2	2.2	0.3	0.0	0.0	0.0	0.1	0.2	0.9	3.5	15.2
Source: NOAA

== Notable residents ==
- Lewis R. Bradley, 2nd governor of Nevada
- Edward P. Carville, 18th governor of Nevada
- Waddie Mitchell, cowboy poet
