= Box Lake (Nevada) =

Lake in Nevada, United States

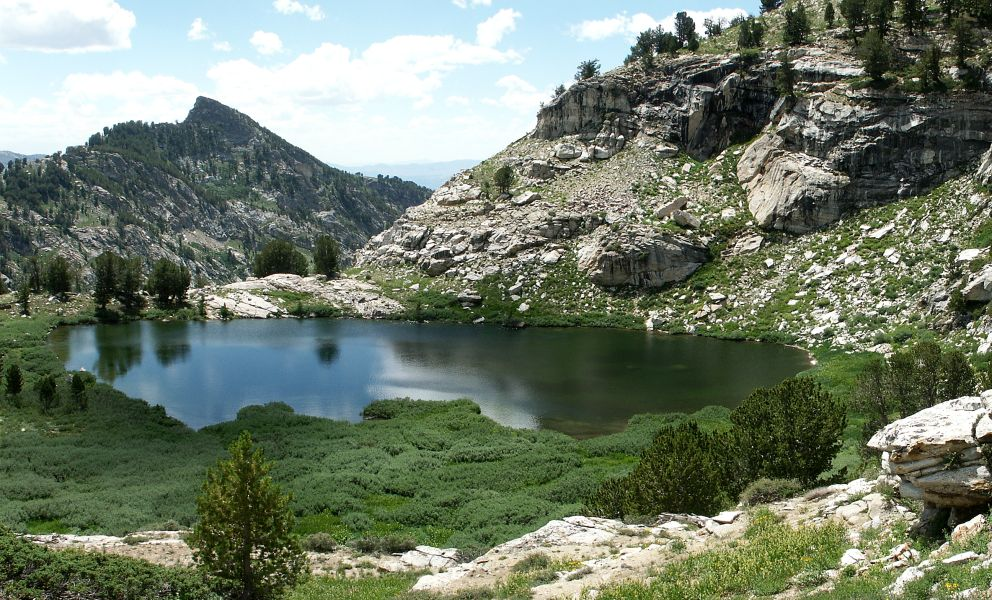

- Location in Nevada
- Location: Ruby Mountains, Elko County, Nevada
- Coordinates: 40°35′48″N 115°25′12″W
- Type: tarn
- Basin countries: United States
- Surface elevation: 9,620 ft (2,930 m)

Box Lake is a glacial tarn in the Ruby Mountains, in Elko County in the northeastern part of the state of Nevada. It is located on a shelf on the side wall of Box Canyon, and at an elevation of 9,620 feet (2,930 m). Along with Snow Lake, it is one of the sources of the stream which flows down Box Canyon. After exiting the mountains it merges with other streams to form the South Fork of the Humboldt River.
