= Snow Lake Peak =

Mountain in Nevada, United States

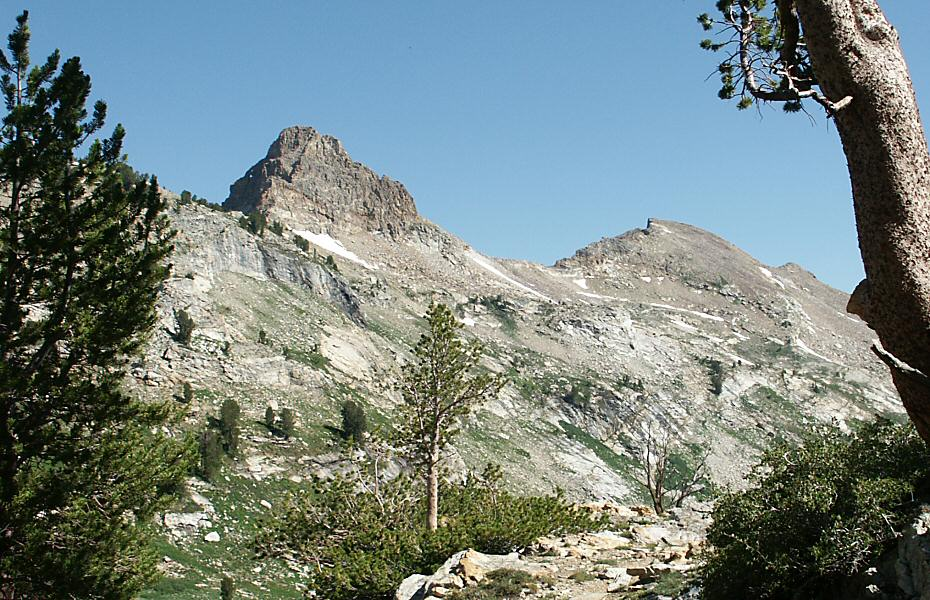
- Snow Lake Peak, looking northwest from the Ruby Crest Trail in Lamoille Canyon

Highest point
- Elevation: 11,142 ft (3,396 m) NAVD 88
- Coordinates: 40°36′20″N 115°23′48″W

Geography
- Location within Nevada
- Location: Elko County, Nevada, U.S.
- Parent range: Ruby Mountains
- Topo map: USGS Ruby Dome

Climbing
- Easiest route: Climb with exposure, class 4+

Snow Lake Peak is the fifth-highest named mountain of the Ruby Mountains and the seventh highest in Elko County, in Nevada, United States. It is the forty-second-highest mountain in the state. It rises from the head of Box Canyon (above Snow Lake), is part of the headwall of Thomas Canyon (with Mount Fitzgerald), and is a prominent part of the west wall of Lamoille Canyon above Lamoille and Dollar Lakes. The peak is located within the Ruby Mountains Wilderness of the Ruby Mountains Ranger District in the Humboldt-Toiyabe National Forest.

== Geography ==
The summit is a high glacial horn located about 25 miles (40 km) southeast of the community of Elko. It is the only major peak of the Ruby Mountains that cannot be reached via a scramble.
