= Seitz =

Seitz may refer to:

- Seitz (surname)
- Seitz (soil), the unofficial state soil of Colorado
- Seitz decision, a 1975 arbitration ruling instrumental in ending Major League Baseball's reserve clause
- Seitz Branch, a stream in Wayne County, Missouri
- Seitz Canyon, in the Ruby Mountains of Elko County, Nevada
- Seitz Lake (Nevada), in Elko County
- 4978 Seitz, an asteroid
