= Department of Conservation and Natural Resources =

Department of Conservation and Natural Resources may refer to:

- Alabama Department of Conservation and Natural Resources
- Nevada Department of Conservation and Natural Resources
- Pennsylvania Department of Conservation and Natural Resources
