= Tipton Peak =

Mountain in Nevada, United States

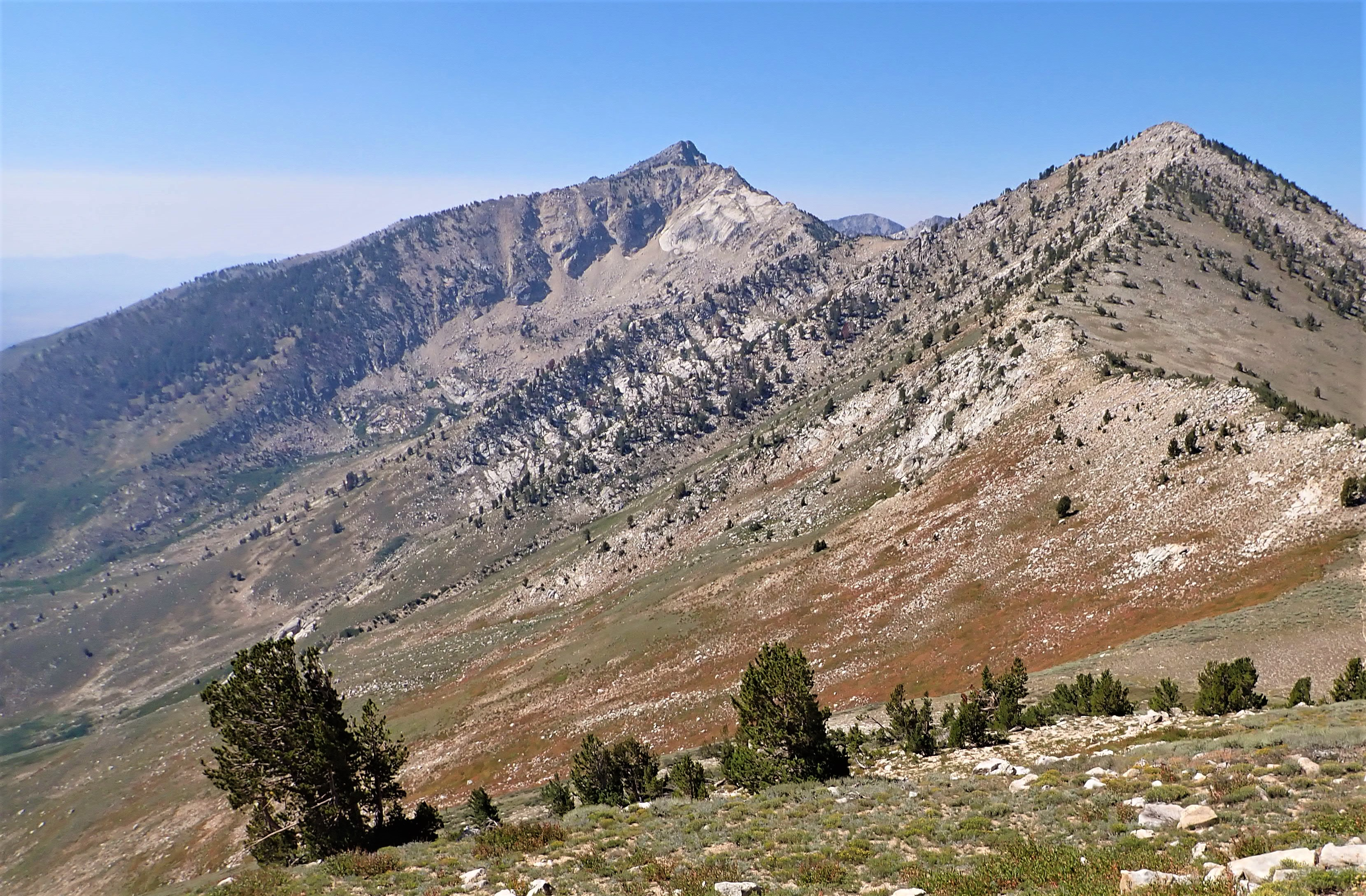
- North aspect, centered

Highest point
- Elevation: 10,941 ft (3,335 m)
- Prominence: 1,101 ft (336 m)
- Parent peak: King Peak (11,036 ft)
- Isolation: 3.82 mi (6.15 km)
- Coordinates: 40°25′22″N 115°28′44″W

Geography
- Location within Nevada Location within the United States
- Location: Ruby Mountains Wilderness
- Country: United States of America
- State: Nevada
- County: Elko
- Parent range: Ruby Mountains; Great Basin Ranges
- Topo map: USGS Franklin Lake NW

Geology
- Mountain type: Fault block

Tipton Peak is a 10,941-foot elevation (3,335 m) summit located in Elko County, Nevada, United States.

== Description ==
Tipton Peak is set along the crest of the Ruby Mountains which are a subset of the Great Basin Ranges. This peak is set within the Ruby Mountains Wilderness which is managed by the Humboldt–Toiyabe National Forest. It is situated four miles (6.4 km) south of line parent King Peak. Precipitation runoff from the mountain's west slope drains to South Fork Humboldt River via Smith and Huntington Creeks, whereas the east slope drains to Franklin Lake in Ruby Valley. Topographic relief is significant as the summit rises 4,900 feet (1,500 meters) above Ruby Valley in three miles (4.8 km). This landform's toponym has been officially adopted by the U.S. Board on Geographic Names.

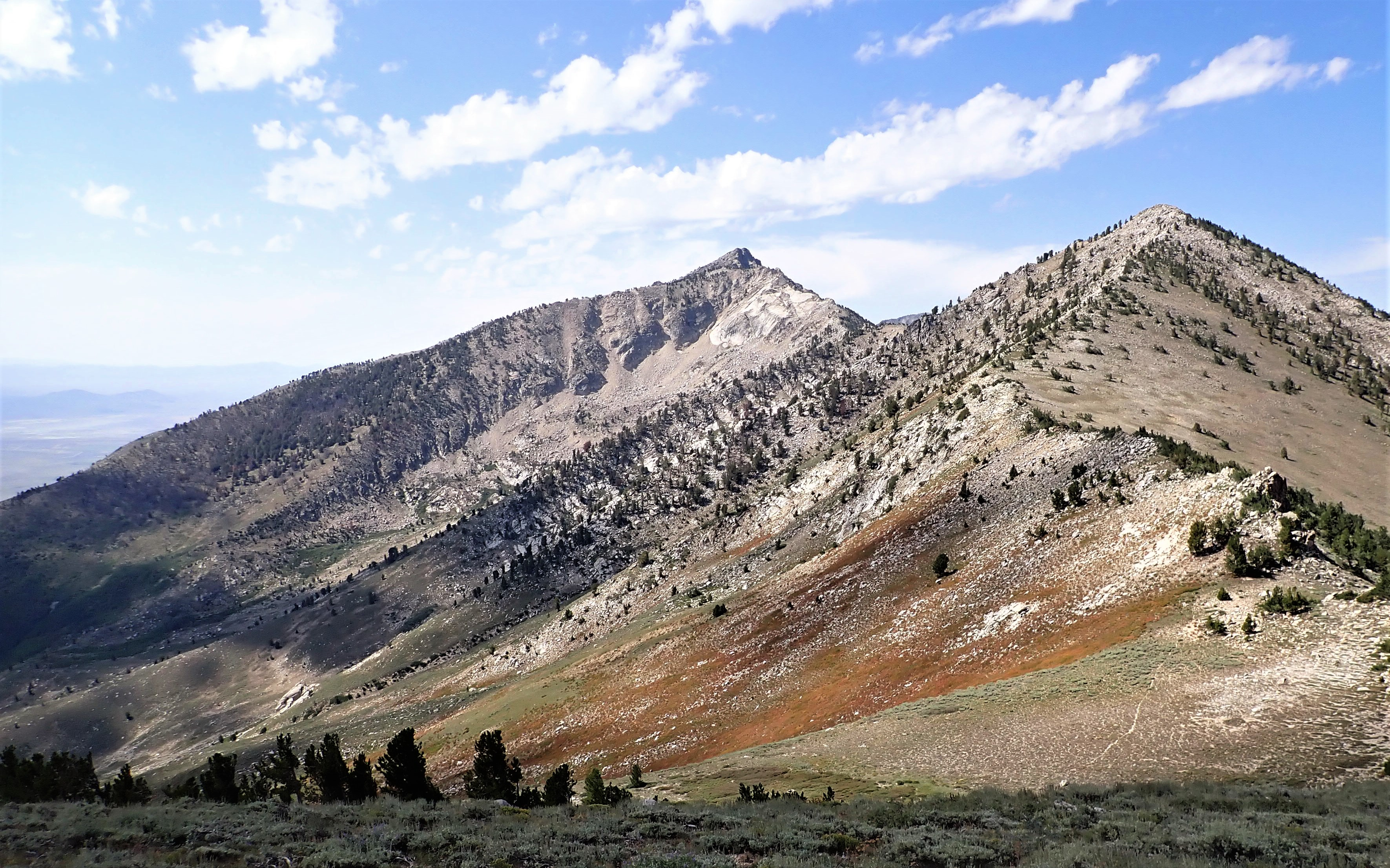
Tipton Peak centered with Peak 10497 (right)

== Climate ==
Tipton Peak is set within the Great Basin Desert which has hot summers and cold winters. The desert is an example of a cold desert climate as the desert's elevation makes temperatures cooler than lower elevation deserts. Due to the high elevation and aridity, temperatures drop sharply after sunset. Summer nights are comfortably cool. Winter highs are generally above freezing, and winter nights are bitterly cold, with temperatures often dropping well below freezing. Alpine climate characterizes the summit and upper slopes.

== See also ==
- List of mountain peaks of Nevada
- Great Basin
