= Hidden Lakes (Nevada) =

Glacial lake in Nevada, United States

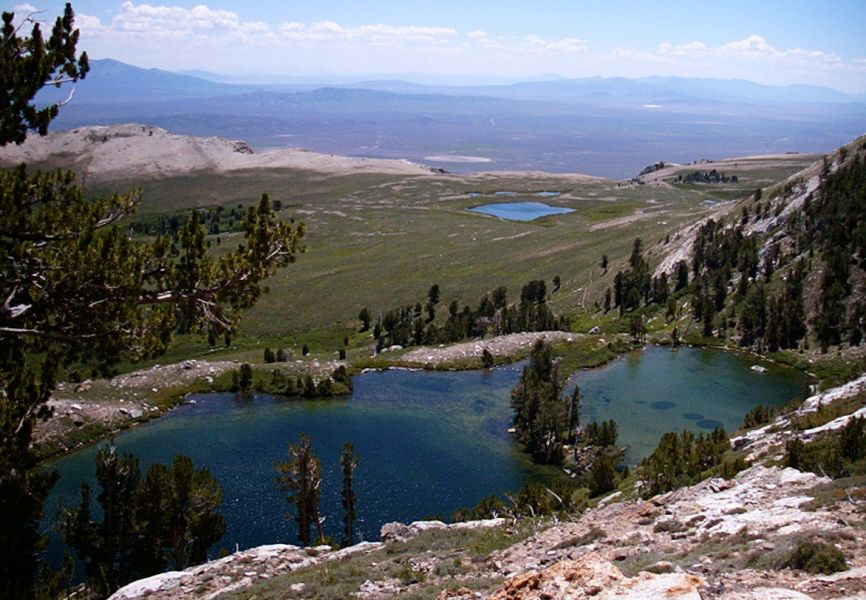
- Hidden Lakes (foreground), in the Ruby Mountains of northeastern Nevada, looking southeast.

- Location within Nevada
- Interactive map of Hidden Lakes
- Location: Elko County, Nevada
- Coordinates: 40°44.6′N 115°17.0′W
- Type: Glacial tarn
- Primary outflows: Soldier Creek
- Basin countries: United States
- Surface area: 9 acres (3.6 ha)
- Max. depth: 32 feet (9.8 m)
- Surface elevation: 9,500 feet (2,900 m)
- References: U.S. Geological Survey Geographic Names Information System: Hidden Lakes (Nevada)

The Hidden Lakes are a pair of glacial tarns in the Ruby Mountains, in Elko County in the northeastern part of the state of Nevada. They are located on a shelf on the Ruby Crest above Soldier Basin at an elevation of 9,500 feet (2,900 m). They have a combined area of approximately 9 acres (3.6 hectares), and a depth of up to 32 feet (9.8 m).

Hidden Lakes are two of the many sources of Soldier Creek, which flows from the eastern side of the Ruby Mountains through Soldier Canyon, exits the mountains to the west into Lamoille Valley, and then merges with the main branch of the Humboldt River. Soldier Lakes are in middle ground of photo.
