= Cold Lake =

Cold Lake may refer to the following:

== Canada ==
- Cold Lake (Alberta), a lake in Alberta and Saskatchewan
- Cold Lake, Alberta, a city
  - CFB Cold Lake, a Royal Canadian Air Force base in Alberta
- Cold Lake oil sands, a deposit of oil sands located near Cold Lake, Alberta
- Cold Lake First Nations, a First Nation in Alberta
- Cold Lake Metis Settlement, Alberta

== Other ==
- Cold Lake (album), an album by Celtic Frost

== See also ==
- Cold Lakes (Nevada)
