= Rabbit Creek =

Rabbit Creek may refer to:

- Rabbit Creek (Alaska), a creek in Anchorage, Alaska
- Rabbit Creek (Nevada), a creek in Nevada, United States
- Rabbit Creek (Nipissing District), a creek in Ontario, Canada
- Rabbit Creek (South Dakota), a creek in South Dakota, United States

== See also ==
- Rabbit River (disambiguation)
