= Ruby Crest National Recreation Trail =

National Recreation Trail in Nevada, US

Coordinates: 40.548°N 115.405°W

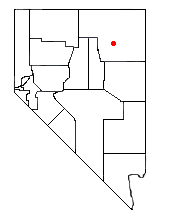
Location of the Ruby Crest Trail within Nevada.

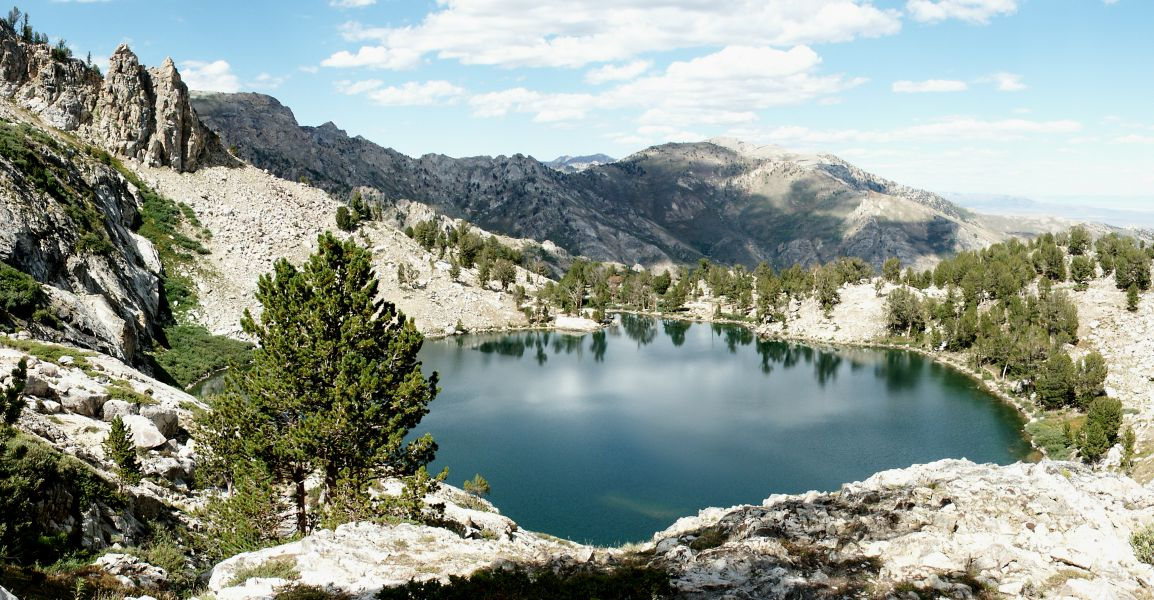
Overland Lake

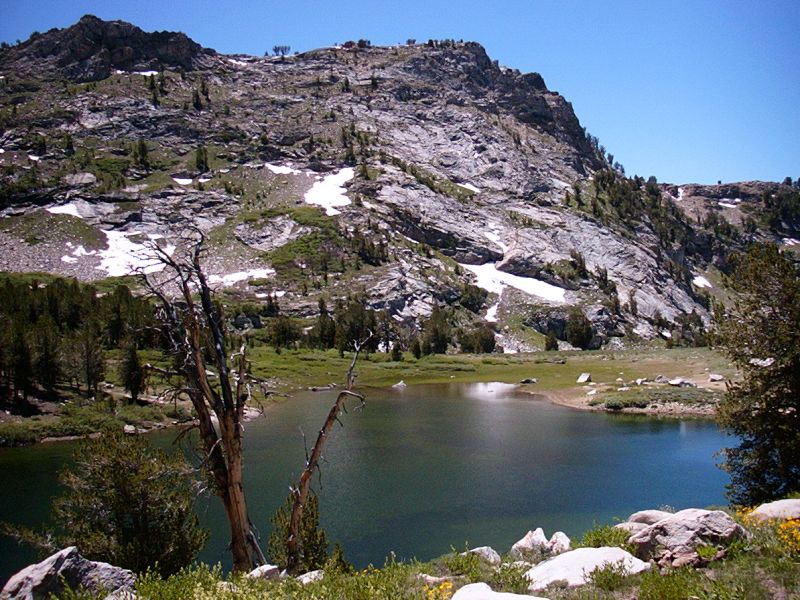
North Furlong Lake

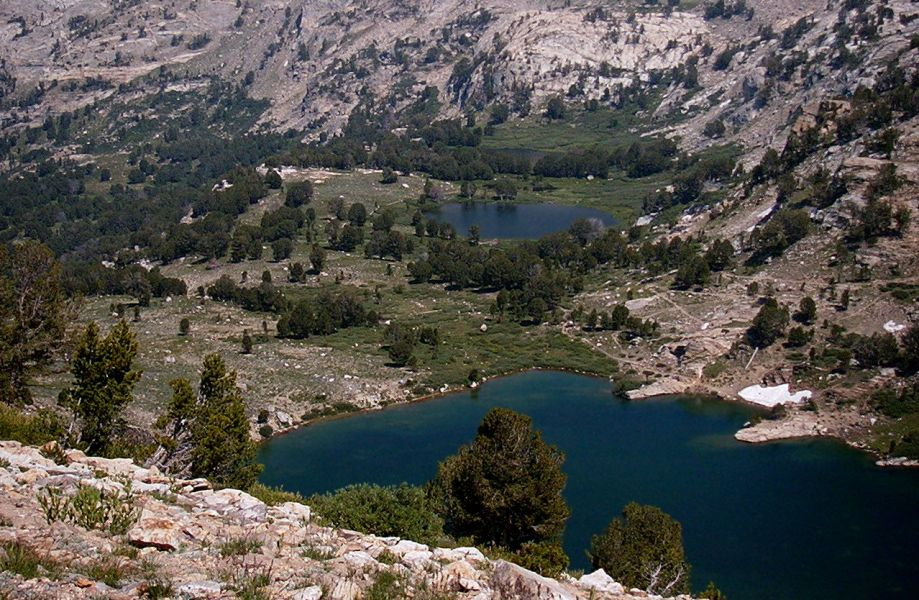
Lamoille Lake (near) and Dollar Lakes

The Ruby Crest National Recreation Trail is a National Recreation Trail in the upper elevations of the central Ruby Mountains, in Elko County, Nevada, United States. Approximately 38 miles (61 km) in length, the trail is used by hikers and pack trains to experience some of the most spectacular scenery in the western United States.

The southern end of the trail is just north of Harrison Pass, at approximately 40°20.2'N and 115°30.1'W and an elevation of 7,300 feet (2,200 m). From there it climbs northward around Green and Tipton Peaks, while crossing the three upper forks of Smith Creek. It then climbs steeply to a 10,400 feet (3,200 m) pass, and descends to scenic Overland Lake.

The next section of trail most closely follows the actual crest of the Rubies, and is therefore the driest. The trail circles around the upper parts of Overland Creek, passes King Peak 11,045 feet (3,367 m), climbs to the crest, and then stays above 10,000 feet (3,000 m) while passing Long and Mahogany Canyons. After crossing over the top of Wine's Peak 10,900 feet (3,300 m), it finally descends again into forested areas. A short side trail leads to North Furlong Lake, a common campsite.

The northern section of the trail includes the most spectacular alpine scenery. The trail drops into Kleckner Canyon (with distant views of Ruby Dome) and crosses Kleckner Creek just below Favre and Castle Lakes. It then climbs to Liberty Lake and Liberty Pass 10,400 feet (3,200 m). Finally, it descends steeply to Lamoille and Dollar Lakes, and then continues down to the Road's End Trailhead at the end of Lamoille Canyon Road in Lamoille Canyon, at approximately 40°36.2'N and 115°22.5'W at an elevation of 8,800 feet (2,700 m).

The USGS 7.5 minute topographic quadrangles that include the length of the trail are: Ruby Dome, Franklin Lake NW, Green Mountain, Harrison Pass, Franklin Lake SW, and Lee.
