= North Furlong Lake (Nevada) =

Lake in Elko County, Nevada, United States

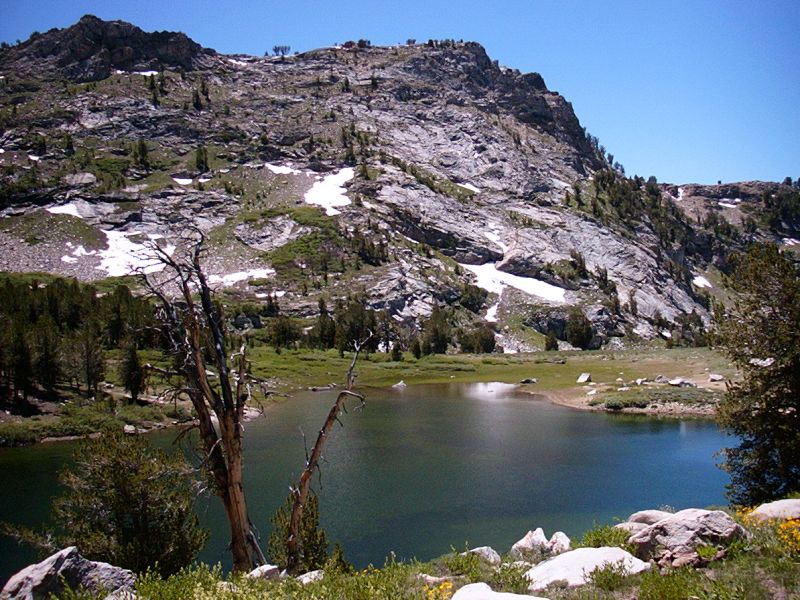

- Location in Nevada
- Location: Ruby Mountains, Elko County, Nevada
- Coordinates: 40°33′24″N 115°24′48″W
- Type: tarn
- Basin countries: United States
- Surface area: 16 acres (6.5 ha)
- Max. depth: 20 ft (6.1 m)
- Surface elevation: 9,590 ft (2,920 m)

North Furlong Lake is a glacial tarn in the Ruby Mountains, in Elko County in the northeastern part of the state of Nevada. It is located at the head of North Furlong Canyon at approximately 40°33.4′N 115°24.8′W, and at an elevation of 9,590 feet (2,920 meters). It has an area of approximately 16 acres (6.5 hectares), and a depth of up to 20 feet (6.1 meters). This is a common camp for users of the Ruby Crest National Recreation Trail, which passes nearby.

North Furlong Lake is the primary source of North Furlong Creek, which after exiting the mountains merges with other streams to form the South Fork of the Humboldt River.
