= Robinson Lake =

Robinson Lake may refer to:

- Robinson Lake in Cross County, Arkansas
- Robinson Lake in Miller County, Arkansas
- Robinson Lake in Jefferson County, Arkansas
- Robinson Lake in Woodruff County, Arkansas
- Robinson Lake in Michigan
- Robinson Lake in Wabasha County, Minnesota
- Robinson Lake (Nevada)
