= Echo Lake (Nevada) =

Glacial tarn in Ruby Mountains

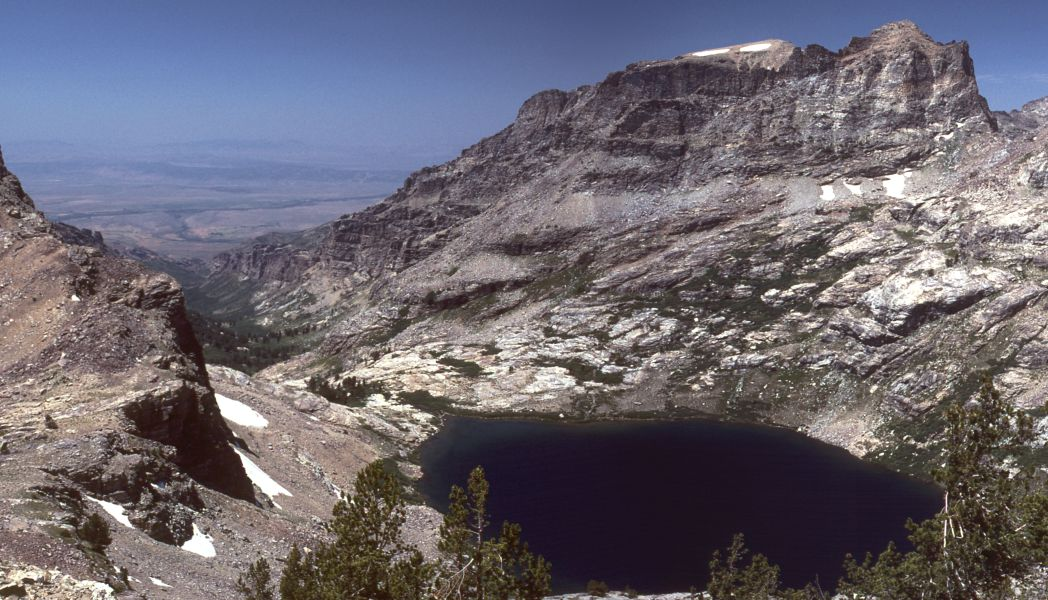

- Location in Nevada
- Location: Ruby Mountains, Elko County, Nevada
- Coordinates: 40°36′42″N 115°26′48″W
- Type: tarn
- Primary outflows: Echo Creek
- Basin countries: United States
- Surface area: 29 acres (12 ha)
- Max. depth: 155 ft (47 m)
- Surface elevation: 9,830 ft (3,000 m)

Echo Lake is a glacial tarn in the Ruby Mountains, in Elko County in the northeastern part of the state of Nevada. It is located at the head of remote Echo Canyon at approximately 40°36.7′N 115°26.8′W, and at an elevation of 9,830 feet (3,000 meters). It has an area of approximately 29 acres (12 hectares), and a depth of up to 155 feet (47 meters), making it both the largest and deepest lake in the Ruby Mountains. It is the major source of Echo Creek, which after exiting the mountains merges with other streams to form the South Fork of the Humboldt River.
