= South Fork Dam (Nevada) =

Dam in Elko County, Nevada, United States

Coordinates: 40°41′03″N 115°47′01″W

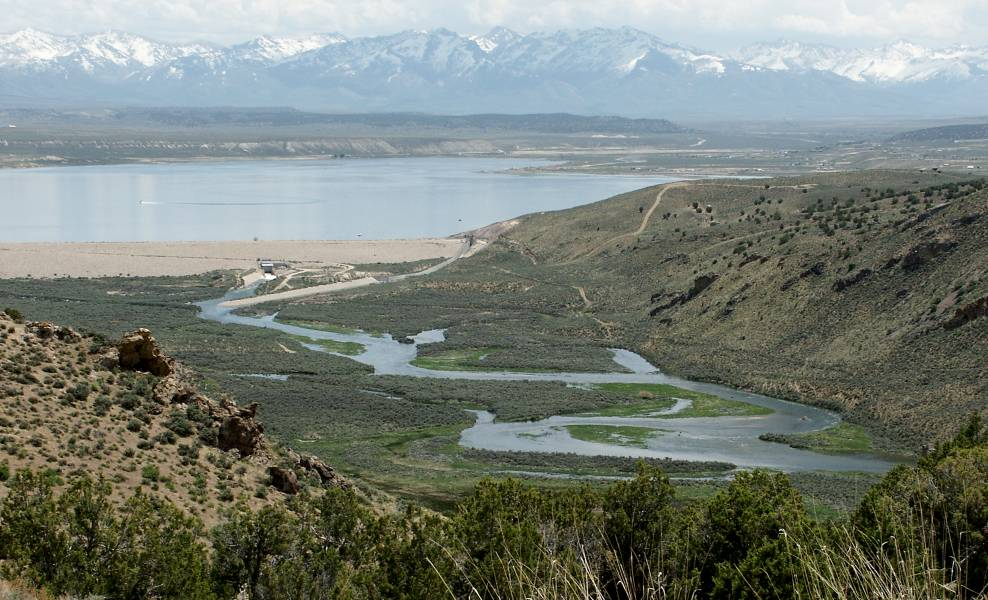
South Fork Dam and Reservoir, looking southeast

South Fork Dam is a dam in Elko County, Nevada, in the northeastern part of the state, about fifteen miles south of the town of Elko.

The earthen dam was completed in 1988 by the Nevada Department of Conservation and Natural Resources, with a height of 72 feet and 1650 feet long at its crest. It impounds South Fork Humboldt River for flood control and recreation.

The reservoir it creates, South Fork Reservoir, has a water surface of 1,650 acres (670 ha) surrounded by 2,200 acres (890 ha) of marsh, meadowland, and hills. The normal elevation is 5,210 feet (1,588 m). Recreation is primarily fishing, for rainbow and brown trout, cutt-bow trout, smallmouth and largemouth black bass, wiper hybrid bass and channel catfish. Facilities include a 25-site campground at the adjacent South Fork State Recreation Area.
