= Mount Gilbert (Nevada) =

Mountain in Nevada, United States

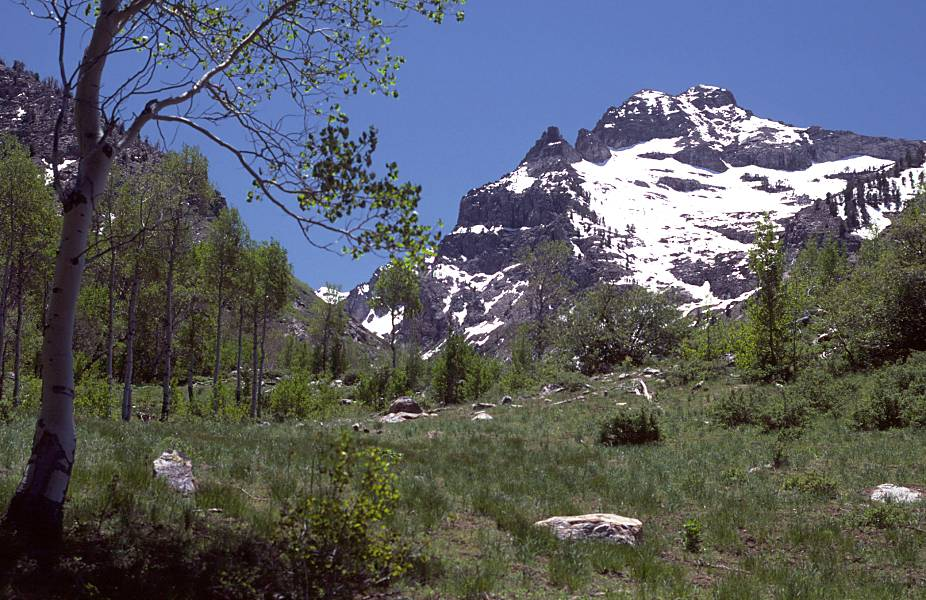

Highest point
- Elevation: 11,125 ft (3,391 m) NAVD 88
- Prominence: 480 ft (146 m)
- Coordinates: 40°37′28″N 115°26′46″W

Geography
- Location within Nevada
- Location: Elko County, Nevada, U.S.
- Parent range: Ruby Mountains
- Topo map: USGS Ruby Dome

Mount Gilbert is the sixth-highest named mountain of the Ruby Mountains and the eighth-highest in Elko County, in Nevada, United States. It is the forty-third-highest mountain in the state. The peak is a spectacular part of the view from State Route 227 in Lamoille Valley, rising over 5,300 feet (1,620 m) above the valley floor at Lamoille. It rises from the head of Seitz Canyon, and is part of the west wall of Right Fork Canyon (a branch of Lamoille Canyon). The summit is a high glacial horn, located about 22 miles (35 km) southeast of the community of Elko within the Ruby Mountains Ranger District of the Humboldt-Toiyabe National Forest.

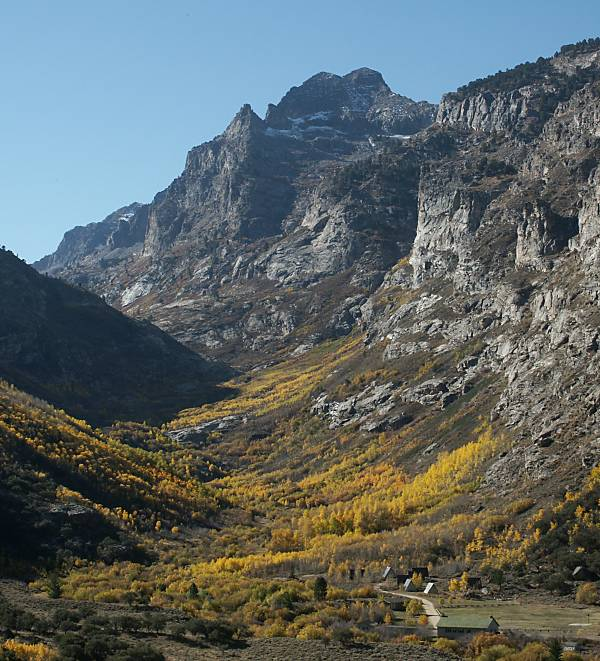
Mount Gilbert in the Ruby Mountains of Nevada, looking up Right Fork Canyon
