= Rabbit River =

Rabbit River may refer to several places:

- Rabbit River (Michigan)
- Rabbit River (Bois de Sioux), a river in Minnesota
- Rabbit River (Mississippi River tributary), a river in Minnesota
- Rabbit River, a tributary of the Liard River in British Columbia

== See also ==
- Rabbit Creek (disambiguation)
