= Mount Fitzgerald (Nevada) =

Mountain in Nevada, United States

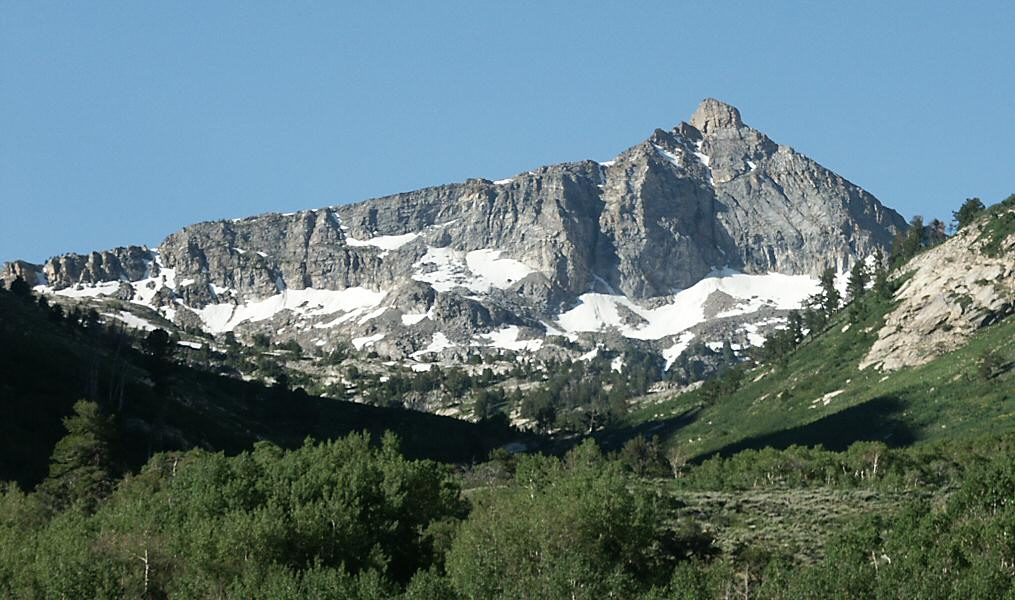

Highest point
- Elevation: 11,220 ft (3,420 m) NAVD 88
- Prominence: 615 ft (187 m)
- Coordinates: 40°36′20″N 115°24′38″W

Geography
- Location within Nevada
- Location: Elko County, Nevada, U.S.
- Parent range: Ruby Mountains
- Topo map: USGS Ruby Dome

Climbing
- Easiest route: East Side from Snow Lake: Hike & Scramble

Mount Fitzgerald is the fourth-highest named mountain in the Ruby Mountains and the fifth-highest in Elko County, in the U.S. state of Nevada. It is the thirty-ninth-highest mountain in the state. It rises from the heads of both Thomas and Right Fork Canyons (branches of Lamoille Canyon), and is also part of the north wall of Box Canyon, making it a true glacial horn. The summit is a high-level ridge and is located about 24 miles (39 km) southeast of the community of Elko, within the Ruby Mountains Wilderness of the Ruby Mountains Ranger District in the Humboldt-Toiyabe National Forest.

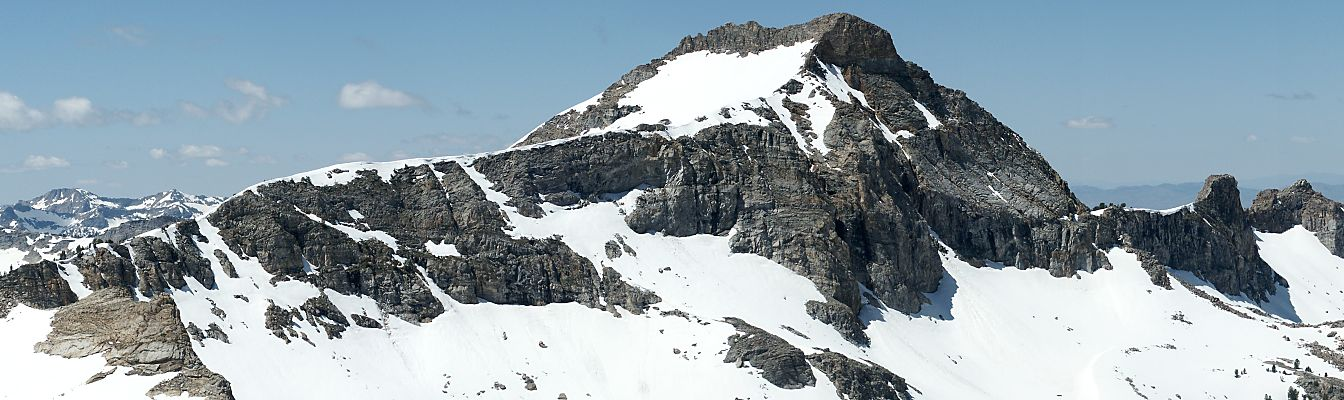
Mount Fitzgerald, Nevada, looking southwest.
