= Right Fork Canyon =

Canyon in the Ruby Mountains, Nevada

Coordinates: 40.635°N 115.437°W

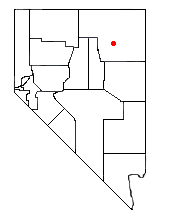
Location of Right Fork Canyon within Nevada

Right Fork Canyon is a major branch of Lamoille Canyon, located in the Ruby Mountains of Elko County, in the northeastern section of the state of Nevada in the western United States. Approximately 5 miles (8 km) in length, it was extensively sculpted by glaciers in previous ice ages.

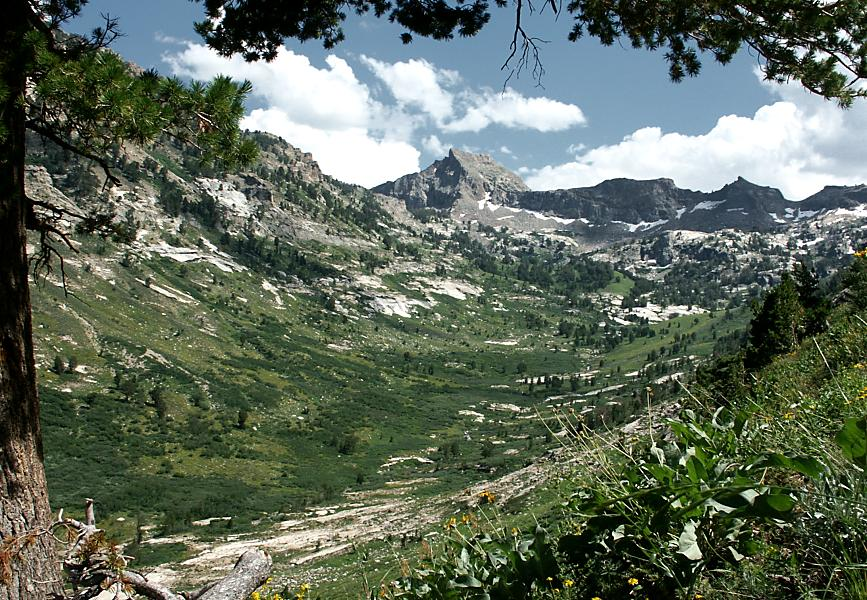
Mount Fitzgerald and Upper Right Fork Canyon

The canyon begins at the summit of Mount Fitzgerald at an elevation of 11,215 feet (3418 m), and quickly descends to its nearly level upper section. It is here that the greatest evidence for glacial sculpturing can be found. The canyon shows a classic U-shaped cross section, and many patches of bare granite still retain the dark patina and striations caused by direct contact with the lower surface of the glacier that once filled this valley.

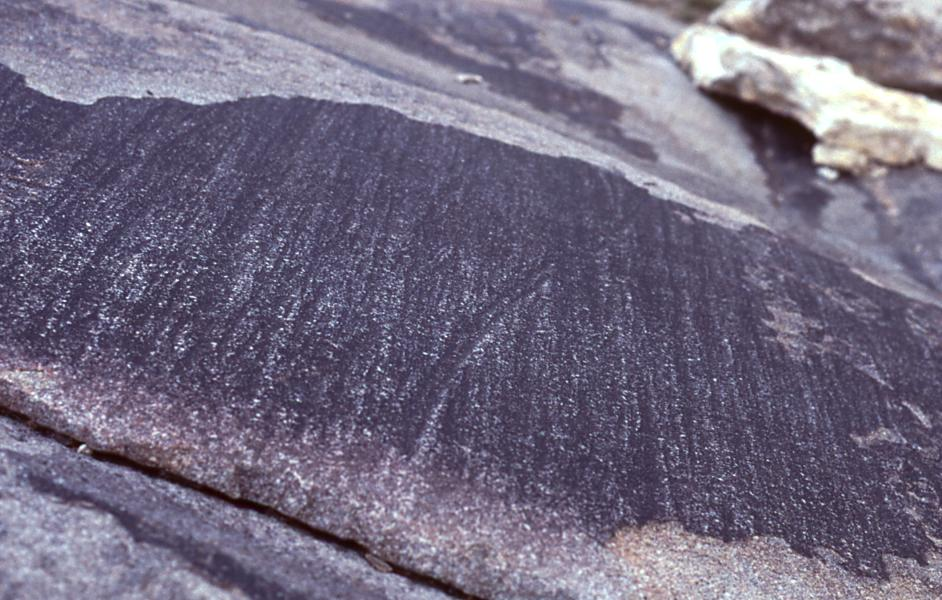
Glacial patina and striations in Upper Right Fork Canyon

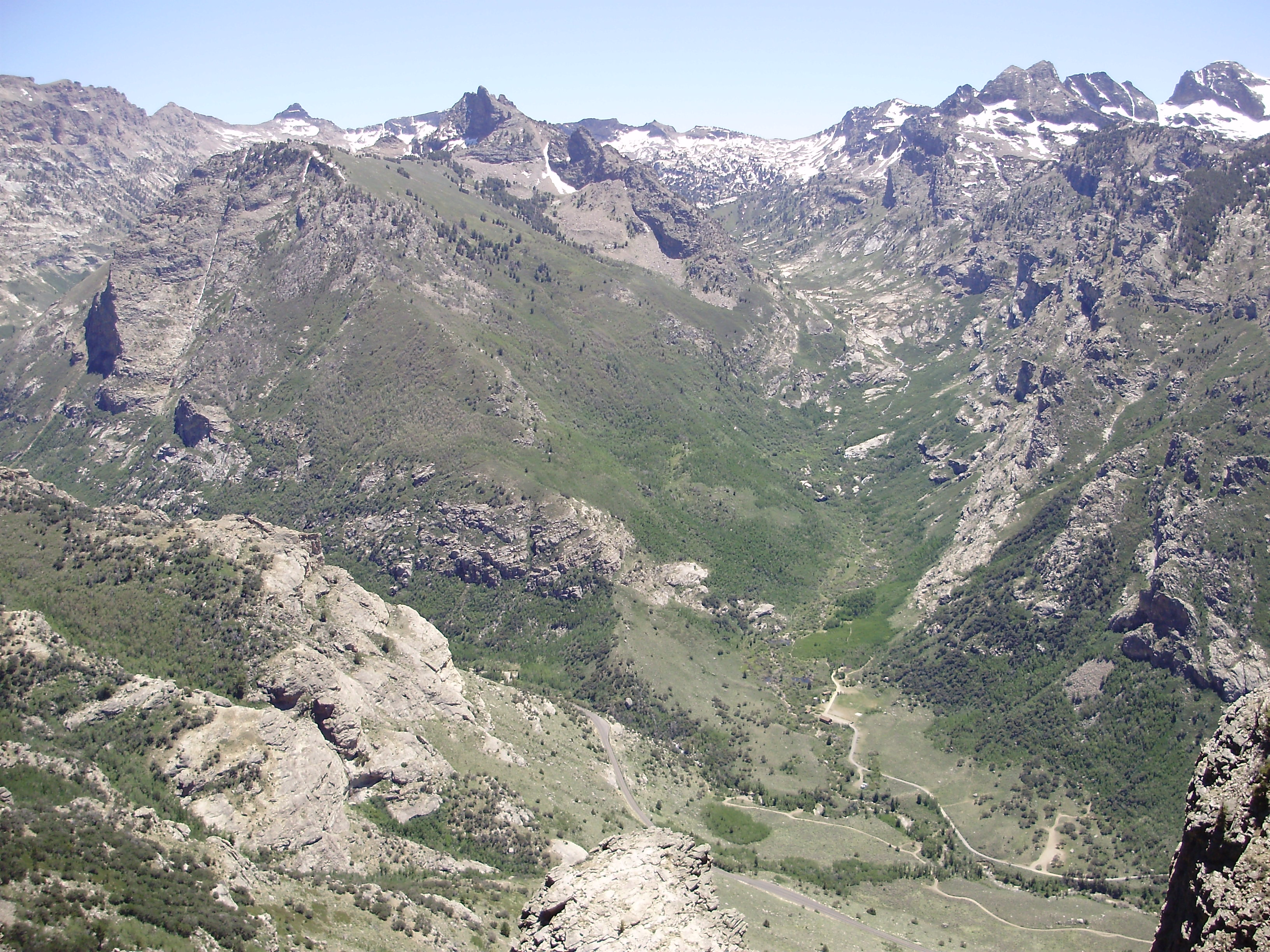
View south up Right Fork Canyon, Nevada from the northeast wall of Lamoille Canyon.

Far below the summit of Mt. Gilbert, the canyon then makes a dramatic drop and sharp turn to enter its lower section. Near here are visible a large geologic fault in the granite wall of the canyon, a steep cascade of the stream flow, and, further down, a 30-foot (10 m) falls. Having descended to an elevation of 7100 feet (2165 m), the canyon finally passes Camp Lamoille and merges with the main branch of Lamoille Canyon.
