= South Fork State Recreation Area =

Recreation area in Nevada, United States

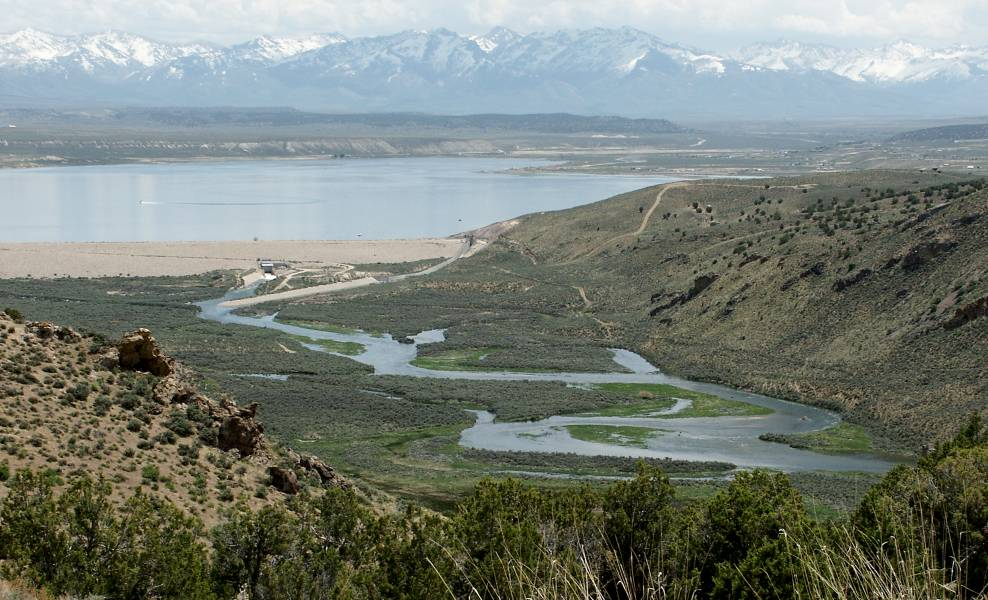
- South Fork Dam and Reservoir, looking southeast

- Location within Nevada
- Location: Elko County, Nevada, United States
- Nearest city: Elko, Nevada
- Coordinates: 40°40′15″N 115°45′44″W
- Area: 3,903.04 acres (1,579.50 ha)
- Elevation: 5,210 ft (1,590 m)
- Established: 1983
- Administrator: Nevada Division of State Parks
- Visitors: 21,378 vehicles (in 2017)
- Designation: Nevada state park
- Website: Official website

South Fork State Recreation Area is a state park unit of the state of Nevada covering nearly four thousand acres, located five miles (8.0 km) due south of Elko. The park comprises the 1,650-acre (670 ha) South Fork Reservoir and surrounding marsh, meadowlands, and hills.

== History ==
The land was formerly the site of the Tomera Ranch, which was sold to the state in 1983. The reservoir was created with construction of the South Fork Dam, an impoundment on the South Fork of the Humboldt River authorized in 1983 and completed in 1988. Filling of the reservoir was completed in 1995.

== Activities and amenities ==
Facilities include a 25-site campground, boat ramp, and parking area near the dam. The reservoir is known for its trophy-class trout and bass fishing. South Fork Canyon, managed by the Bureau of Land Management below the dam, is available for hiking, floating, and fishing.
