= Rabbit Creek (Nevada) =

Coordinates: 40°55′46″N 115°26′38″W

Rabbit Creek is a tributary to the Humboldt River located in Elko County, Nevada.

The creek was originally named Seitz Creek after two brothers (George and Edward Seitz) who settled near present-day Pleasant Valley in 1862 after leaving Pennsylvania. The creek flows from early April to August. The creek is used to irrigate over 3,000 acres of harvest crop and 206 acres of diversified pasture. The earliest water rights on the creek have a priority of 1862. Major users of the creek include Ruby Dome Ranch, Sarman Ranch, Woodbury Ranch, and Boyd Reservoir. Rabbit Creek begins at what is termed Seitz Lake (17 acres) within Seitz Canyon at an altitude of 8,915 feet.
