= King Peak (Nevada) =

Mountain in United States of America

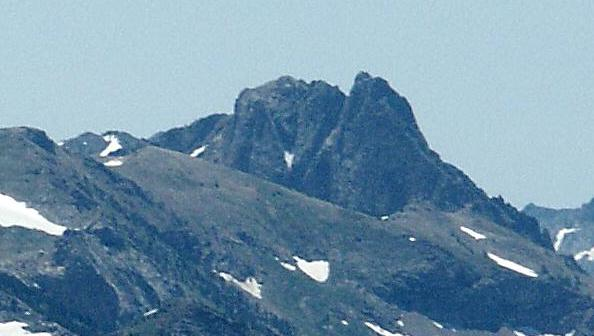
- King Peak, looking south.

Highest point
- Elevation: 11,036 ft (3,364 m) NAVD 88
- Prominence: 1,311 ft (400 m)
- Coordinates: 40°28′36″N 115°28′14″W

Geography
- Location within Nevada
- Location: Elko County, Nevada, U.S.
- Parent range: Ruby Mountains
- Topo map: USGS Franklin Lake NW

Climbing
- Easiest route: From the Ruby Crest Trail: steep hike

King Peak is the southernmost summit above 11,000 feet (3,400 m) in the Ruby Mountains of Elko County, in northeastern Nevada in the western United States. To the west is Rattlesnake Canyon, and to the east is Overland Creek Canyon, which drains into the Ruby Valley). The Ruby Crest National Recreation Trail passes just to the east on its way north from Overland Lake. The summit is located at about 29 miles (47 km) southeast of the community of Elko, in the Humboldt National Forest and the Ruby Mountains Wilderness.

The peak is named for Clarence King, who explored this region in 1869 during the Geological Exploration of the Fortieth Parallel and later became first chief of the United States Geological Survey.

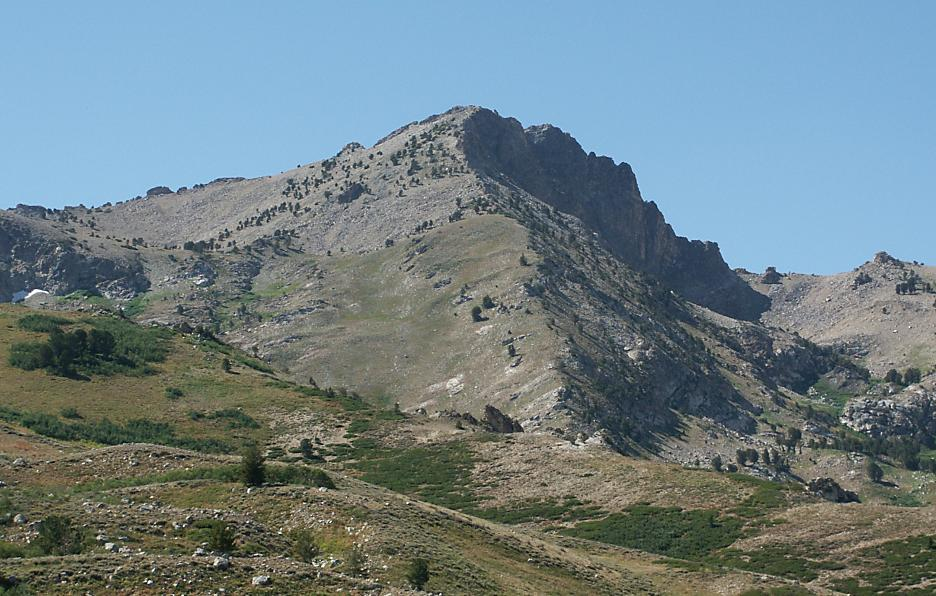
King Peak, looking west from the Overland Lake Trail.
