= Ruby Dome =

Mountain in Nevada, United States

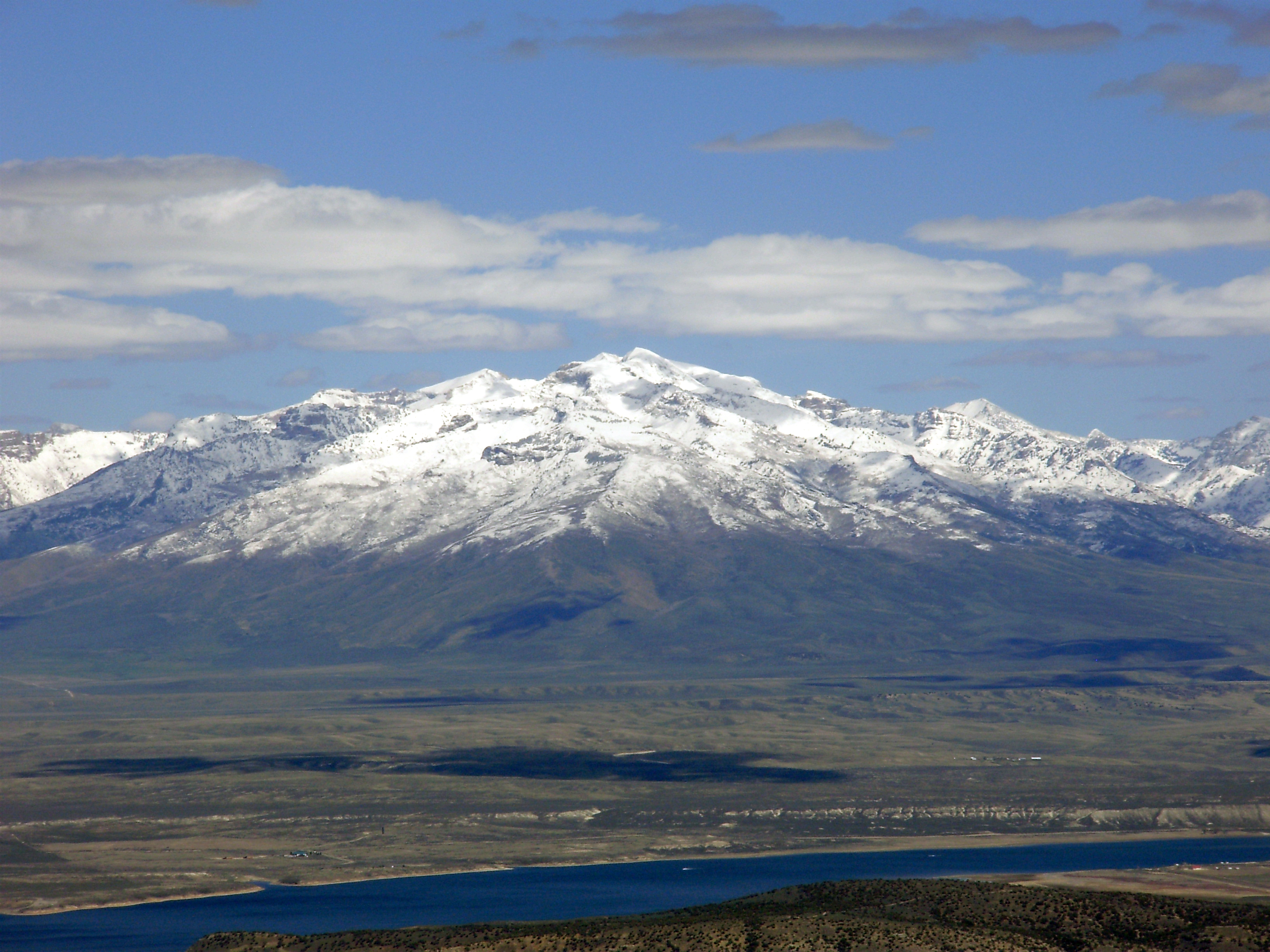

Highest point
- Elevation: 11,392+ ft (3472+ m) NAVD 88
- Prominence: 4,793 ft (1,461 m)
- Parent peak: South Schell Peak
- Isolation: 94.73 mi (152.45 km)
- Listing: Nevada County High Points 6th; Great Basin Peaks List
- Coordinates: 40°37′18″N 115°28′31″W

Geography
- Location within Nevada
- Location: Elko County, Nevada, U.S.
- Parent range: Ruby Mountains
- Topo map: USGS Ruby Dome

Climbing
- Easiest route: From Griswold Lake, Class 2 scramble east to the saddle between Griswold Lake and Seitz Canyon, then up to the saddle on either side of the summit and along the ridgeline

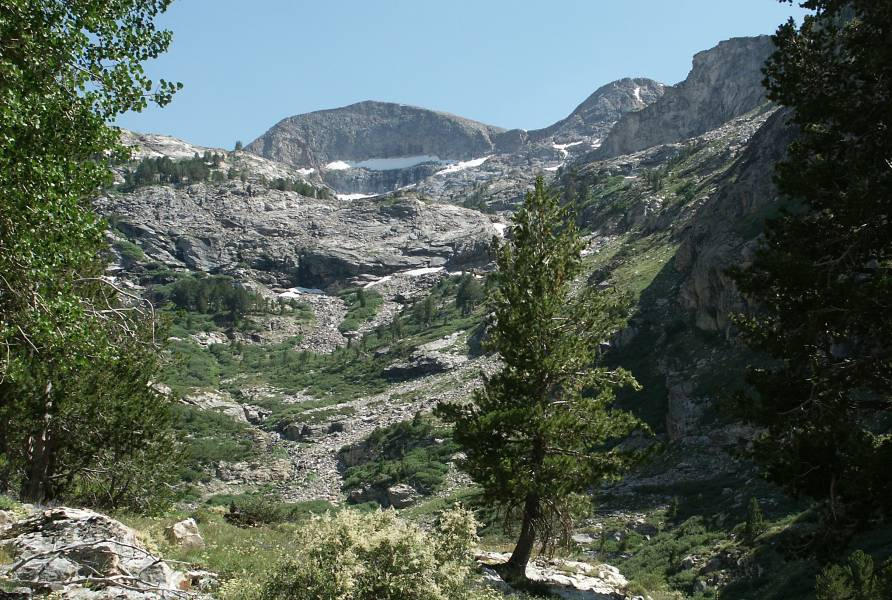
Closer view of Ruby Dome from the trail to the summit

Ruby Dome is the highest mountain in both the Ruby Mountains and Elko County, in Nevada, United States. It is the twenty-seventh-highest mountain in the state, and also ranks as the thirteenth-most topographically prominent peak in the state. The peak is located about 21 miles (34 km) southeast of the city of Elko within the Ruby Mountains Ranger District of the Humboldt-Toiyabe National Forest. The mountain rises from a base elevation of about 6,000 feet (1,800 m) to a height of 11,387 feet (3,471 m). It is the highest mountain for over 90 miles in all directions.

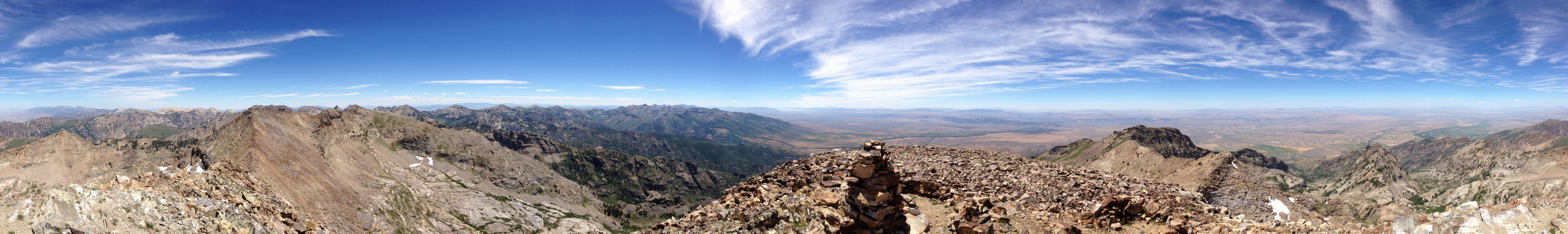
360-degree panorama from the summit of Ruby Dome
