= Cold Lakes (Nevada) =

Pair of glacial tarns in Nevada, US

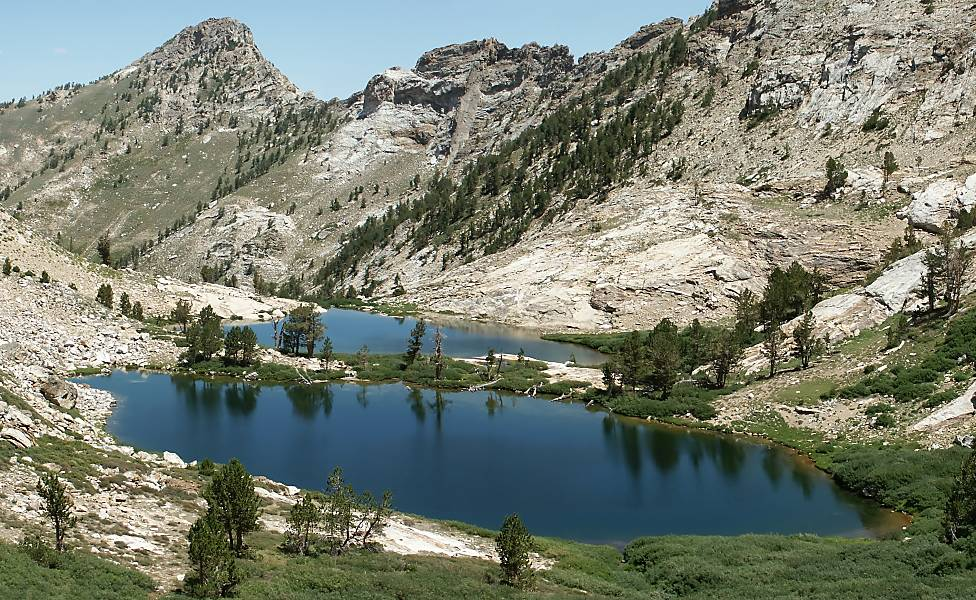

- Location in Nevada
- Location: Ruby Mountains, Elko County, Nevada
- Coordinates: 40°42′54″N 115°18′06″W
- Type: tarns
- Basin countries: United States
- Surface area: 7.4 acres (3.0 ha)
- Max. depth: 28 ft (8.5 m)
- Surface elevation: 9,880 ft (3,010 m)

Cold Lakes are a pair of glacial tarns in the Ruby Mountains, in Elko County in the northeastern part of the state of Nevada. They are located at the head of Cold Creek Canyon, at approximately 40°42.9′N 115°18.1′W, and at an elevation of 9,880 feet (3,010 m). They have a combined area of approximately 7.4 acres (3.0 hectares), and a depth of up to 28 feet (8.5 m).

The outflow of these lakes are one of the sources for Cold Creek, which after exiting the mountains flows down Lamoille Valley and then merges with the main branch of the Humboldt River.

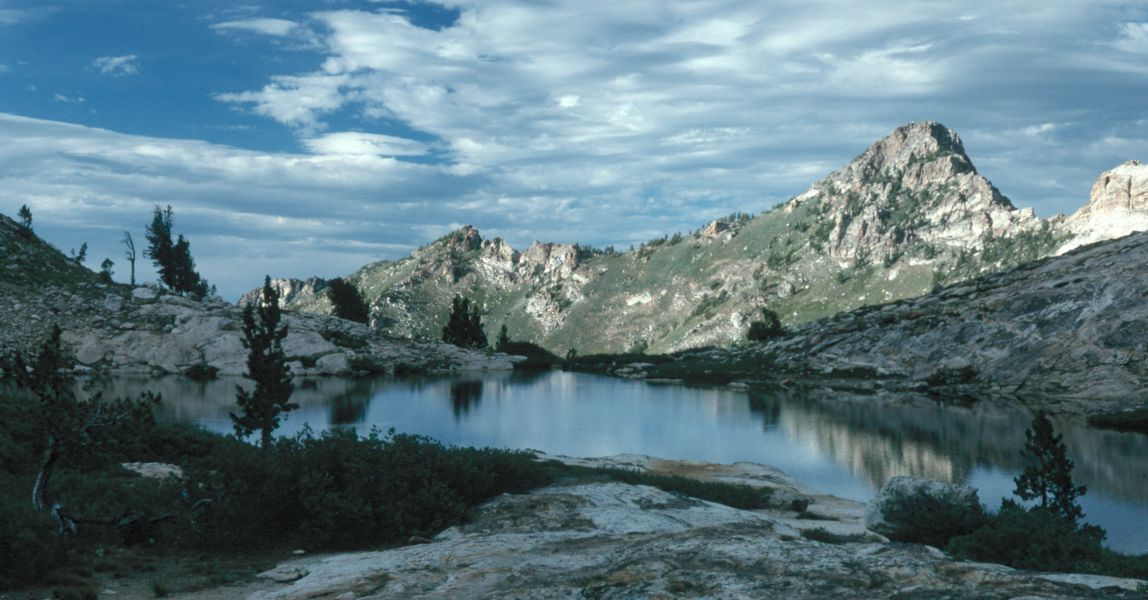
Lower Cold Lake
