= Nevada Department of Conservation and Natural Resources =

Agency of Nevada, US

The Nevada Department of Conservation and Natural Resources (DCNR) is a Nevada state agency that focuses on the preservation and management of Nevada’s natural, cultural, and recreational resources. The current director is James Settelmeyer. The agency is headquartered in Carson City, Nevada. One of its holdings is the South Fork Dam and Reservoir near Elko, Nevada.

== History ==
The department was established in 1957 and has been in operations ever since, although the agency experiences several changes throughout its years. In its year of founding, only four departments existed: the division of water resources, state lands, forestry, as well as oil and gas conservation. By 1977, the oil and gas conservation division was changed into the mineral resources division, and five new divisions were also created: the division of state park, the division of conservation districts, the division of environmental protection, the division of water planning, and the division of historic preservation and archaeology. Of these nine divisions, eight of them (excluding the mineral resources division, which became the Nevada Division of Minerals), existed in the current structure of the department, although their names have undergone some changes.

== Structure ==
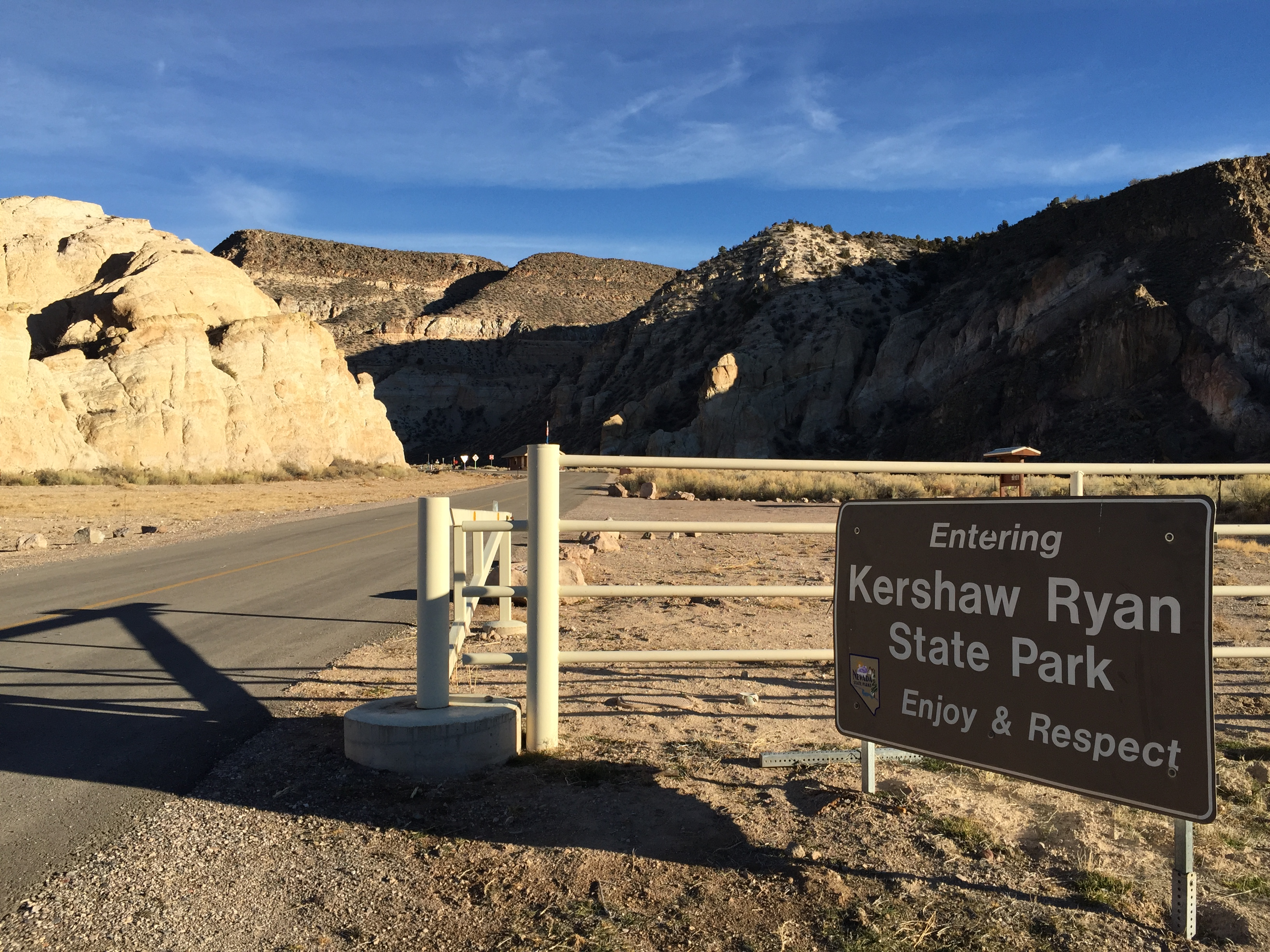
Entrance to Kershaw Ryan State Park

The department includes the following eight divisions:

- Division of Environmental Protection
- Division of Forestry
- Office of Historic Preservation
- Division of Natural Heritage
- Division of Outdoor Recreation
- Division of State Lands
- Division of State Parks
- Division of Water Resources.

Aside from its eight divisions, the DCNR also operates three standalone programs:

1. Nevada Conservation Districts Program: Supports Nevada's community-based conservation districts by providing resources to conserve soil, water, and related resources.
2. Nevada Sagebrush Ecosystem Program: Interagency program to protect and enhance Nevada's sagebrush landscape.
3. Nevada Off-Highway Vehicles Program: Regulates off-road recreation and provides funding for off-highway vehicle trail improvements.

The DCNR also manages the following commissions and councils: State Environmental Commission, State Conservation Commission, Board for Financing Water Projects, Well Drillers’ Advisory Board, Board to Review Petroleum Claims, State Land Use Planning Advisory Council, Sagebrush Ecosystem Council.
