= Overland Lake (Nevada) =

Lake in Nevada, United States

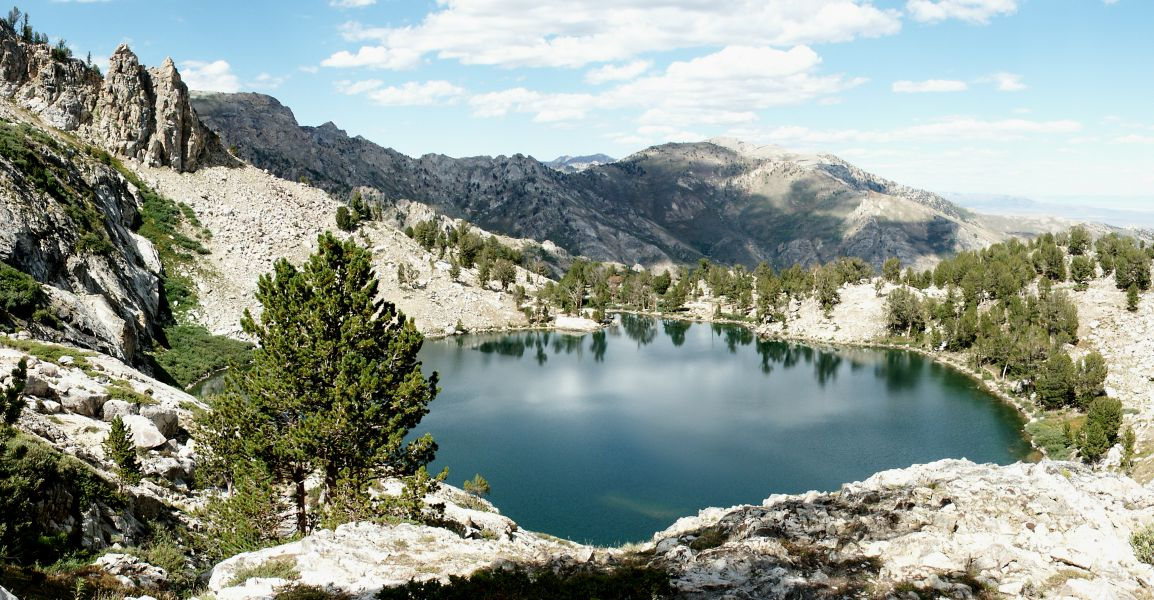

- Location in Nevada
- Location: Ruby Mountains, Elko County, Nevada
- Coordinates: 40°27′36″N 115°27′24″W
- Type: tarn
- Basin countries: United States
- Surface area: 15 acres (6.1 ha)
- Max. depth: 55 ft (17 m)
- Surface elevation: 9,450 ft (2,880 m)

Overland Lake is a glacial tarn in the Ruby Mountains of Elko County in the northeastern part of the state of Nevada. It is located at the head of Overland Canyon at approximately 40°27.6'N and 115°27.4'W, and at an elevation of 9,450 feet (2,880 meters). It has an area of approximately 15 acres (6.1 hectares), and a depth of up to 55 feet (17 m). The Ruby Crest National Recreation Trail runs along the eastern shore of the lake.

Overland Lake is the principal source of Overland Creek, which after exiting the mountains flows into Ruby Valley. It was originally named Marian Lake by geologist Clarence King, after his sister, and was the subject of several famous paintings and photographs. This name, however, was lost, and the name of the lake became associated with the Overland Mail and Stage Route, which passed nearby.
