= Griswold Lake (Nevada) =

Lake in Nevada, United States

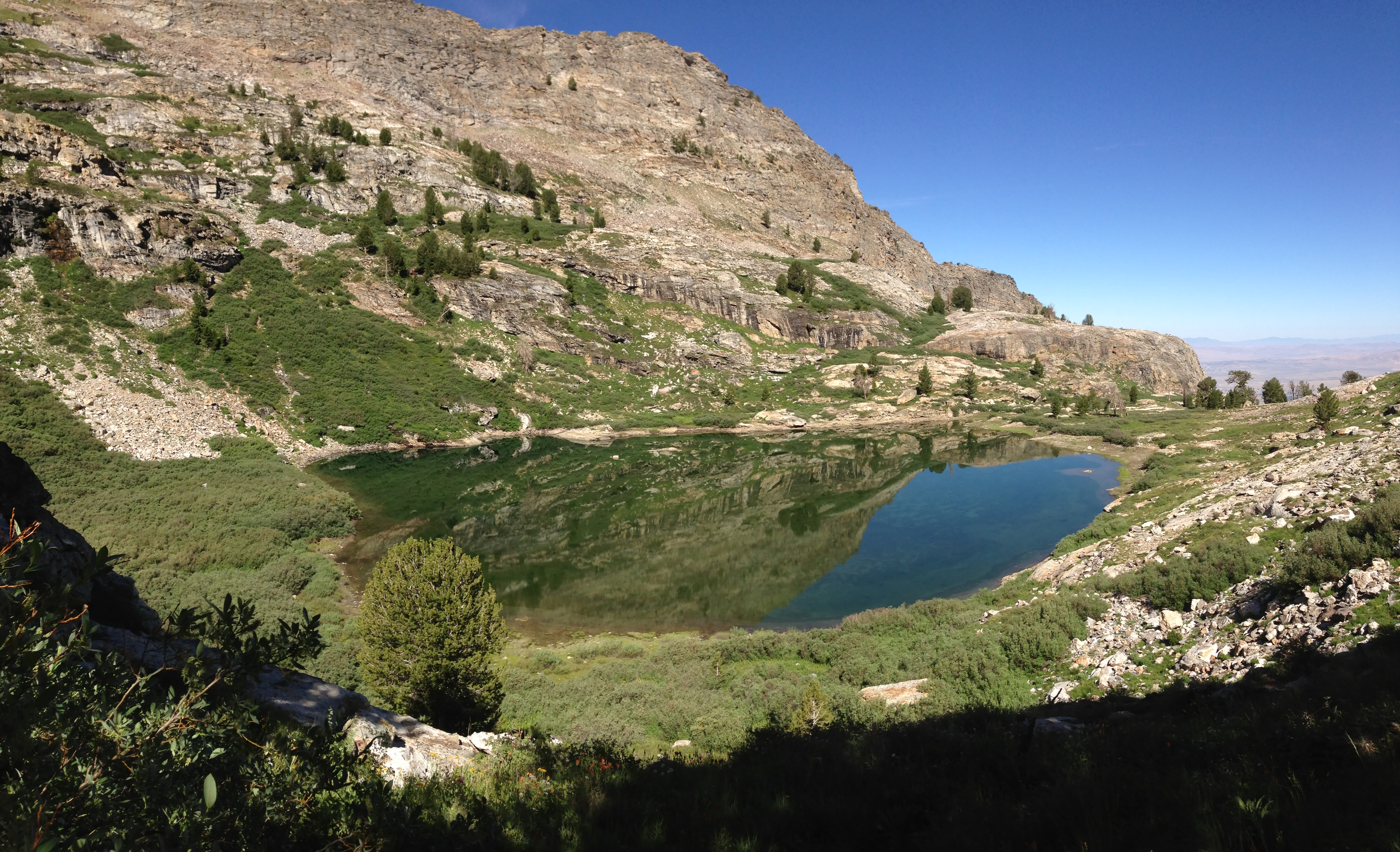

- Location in Nevada
- Location: Ruby Mountains, Elko County, Nevada
- Coordinates: 40°38′06″N 115°29′12″W
- Type: tarn
- Primary outflows: Butterfield Creek
- Basin countries: United States
- Surface area: 17 acres (6.9 ha)
- Max. depth: 20 ft (6.1 m)
- Surface elevation: 9,222 ft (2,811 m)

Griswold Lake is a glacial tarn in the Ruby Mountains of Elko County, Nevada, United States. It is within the Ruby Mountains Ranger District of the Humboldt-Toiyabe National Forest. The lake is located at the head of Hennen Canyon, at approximately 40°38.1′N 115°29.2′W, and at an elevation of 9,222 feet (2,811 meters). It has an area of approximately 17 acres (6.9 hectares), and a depth of up to 20 feet (6.1 meters).

Griswold Lake is the principal source of Butterfield Creek, which flows down Hennen Canyon before exiting the mountains into Pleasant Valley. The lake is named after Chauncy "Chan" Griswold, an early rancher in Pleasant Valley and the father of Nevada Governor Morley Griswold. Butterfield Creek was also named after an early rancher, Henry Butterfield.

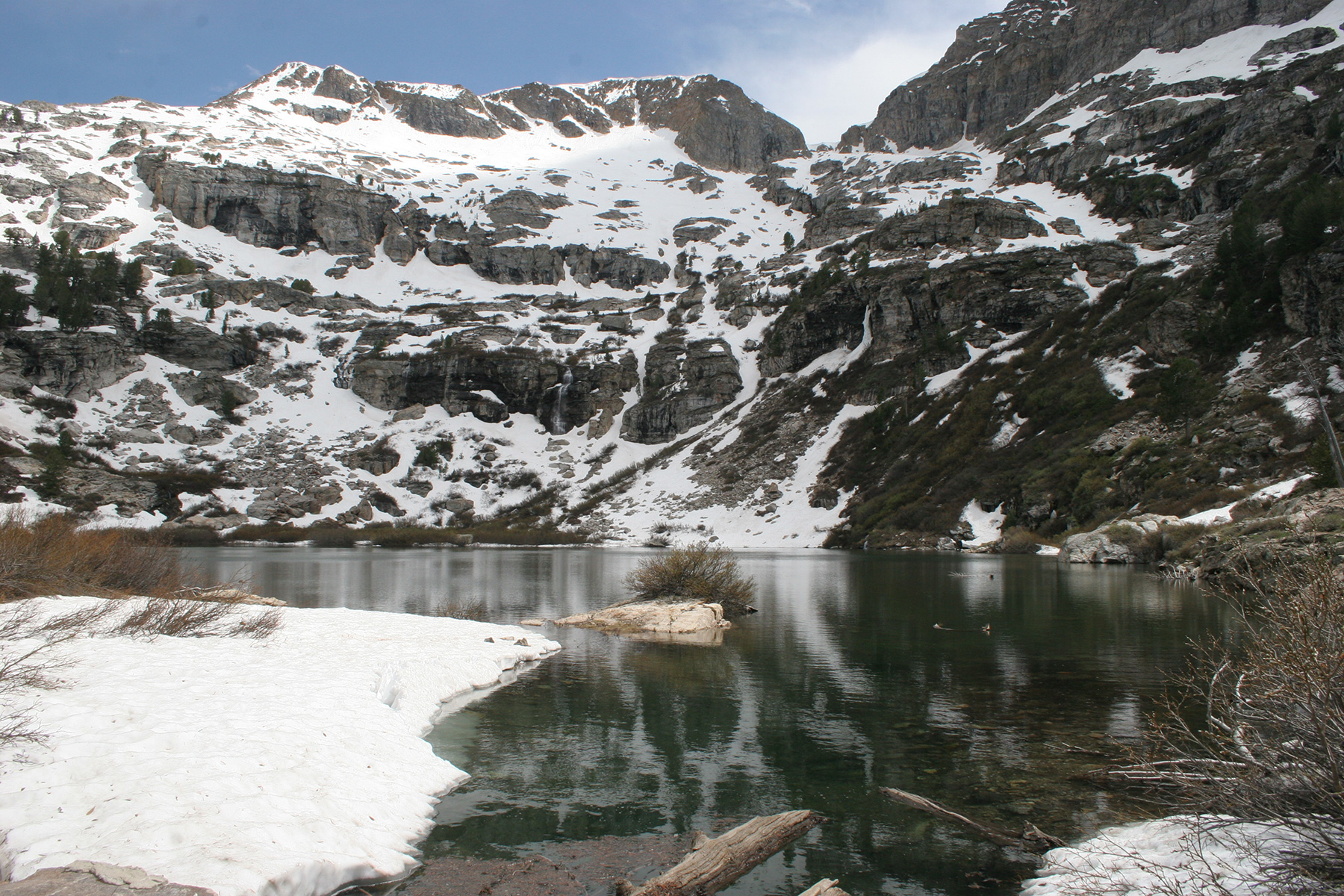
Griswold Lake from the North Shore
