= Seitz Canyon =

Natural feature, Elko County, Nevada

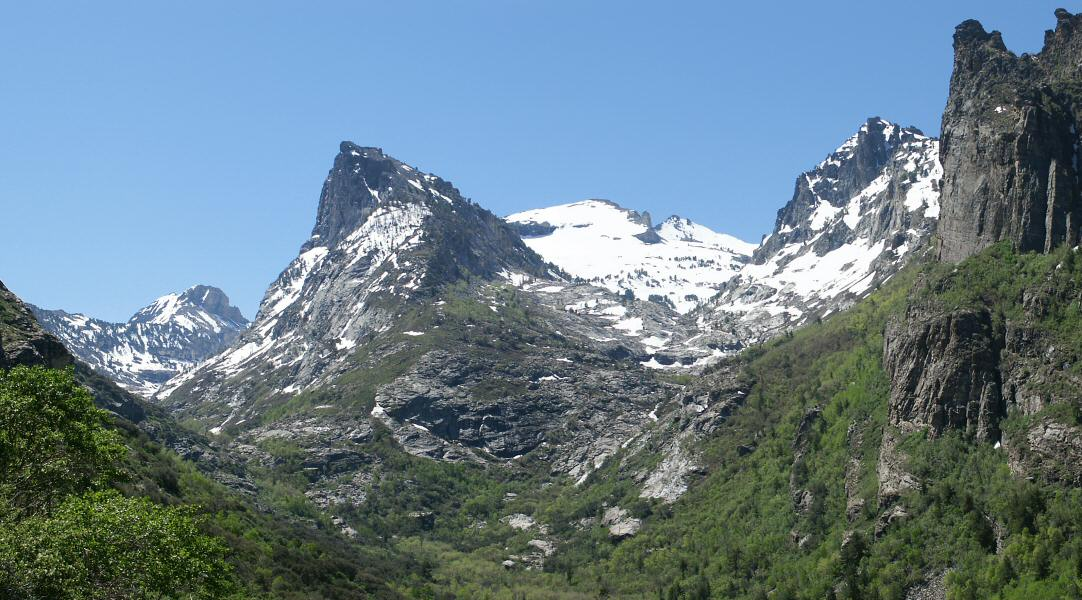
- Seitz Canyon, looking southeast

- Location within Nevada
- Length: 5.5 mi (8.9 km)

Geography
- Location: Elko County, Nevada, United States
- Coordinates: 40.660°N 115.486°W
- Interactive map of Seitz Canyon

Seitz Canyon is one of the major canyons and valleys within the Ruby Mountains of Elko County, in the northeastern section of the state of Nevada in the western United States. Approximately 5.5 miles (8.9 km) in length, it was extensively sculptured by glaciers in previous ice ages. Remote, scenic, and ecologically diverse, it is protected in both the Ruby Mountains Wilderness Area and the Seitz-Echo Research Natural Area.

The main branch of Seitz Canyon begins at the summit of Mt. Silliman, at an elevation of 11,250 feet (3,430 m). This high ridge also includes Mt. Gilbert at 11,120 ft (3,390 m), and an unnamed peak at 11,035 ft (3,363 m). The canyon then drops to the north as a spectacular headwall of over 2,000 ft (610 m) to a nearly level basin that includes Seitz Lake.

It is here that the greatest evidence for glacial sculpturing can be found. The canyon shows a classic U-shaped cross section, and many patches of bare granite still retain the dark patina and striations caused by direct contact with the lower surface of the glacier that once filled this valley.

From Seitz Lake the canyon makes a more gradual descent to its middle section 8,000 ft (2,400 m), an area that includes a dense stand of aspen trees and beaver ponds. It then descends again to its large lower section 7,000 ft (2,100 m), which includes an open forest of aspen and white fir trees, sagebrush flats, and the junction with the south branch of the canyon. Towering 1,500 ft (460 m) above are granite cliffs and pinnacles.

Like its neighbor to the north, Lamoille Canyon, Seitz Canyon is branched. The southern fork begins at the highest point of the range, the north face of Ruby Dome 11,387 ft (3,471 m). Nearby are two other tall peaks known locally as Ruby Pyramid and Seitz Peak. The canyon descends steeply in four steps before merging with the main branch of the canyon.

This southern branch of the canyon may have once drained into the adjacent smaller valley of Thompson Creek. By this theory, early glaciers were able to break through the narrow ridge separating the canyons, and subsequently flow into the deeper main branch of Seitz Canyon. The result is that Thompson Creek is now a 'reverse' hanging valley, with its source perched 1,200 ft (370 m) up the wall of Seitz Canyon. This merger also led to a large area of exposed granite at the bottom of Seitz Canyon, and a steep cascade of the stream nearly 1,000 ft (300 m) long.

The merger of the two branches of Seitz Canyon forms Rabbit Creek, which drains into Pleasant Valley and then meanders across Lamoille Valley before merging with the Humboldt River near the community of Halleck. As the stream exits the range, it passes the last unusual feature of Seitz Canyon, the best examples of lateral moraines in the Ruby Mountains. These ridges were formed as the glaciers dropped the rocks they had scraped from higher slopes. The moraines show the curve the glaciers took as they exited the confines of the rocky canyon, and exhibit multiple secondary ridges produced as the glaciers retreated at the end of the last ice age.

The canyon (and the lake within it) was named after brothers George and Edward Seitz, who were early ranchers in Pleasant Valley. George eventually left the area, but Ed Seitz became the sheriff of Elko County in 1869.

== Gallery ==
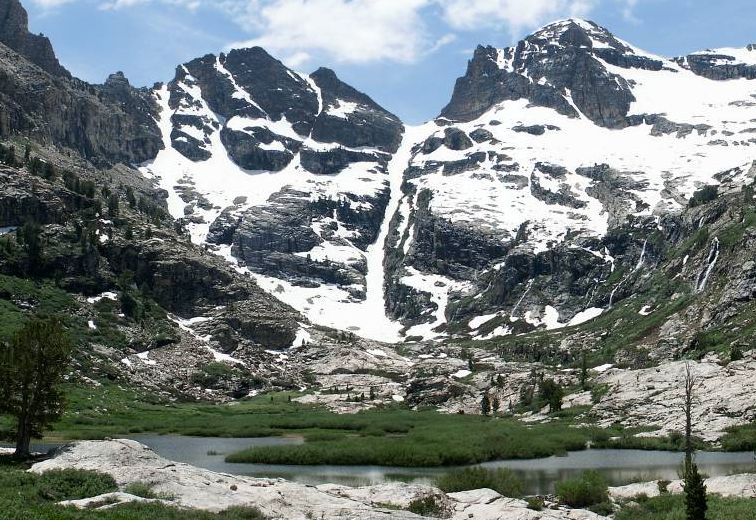
The headwall of Seitz Canyon, and Seitz Lake, looking south

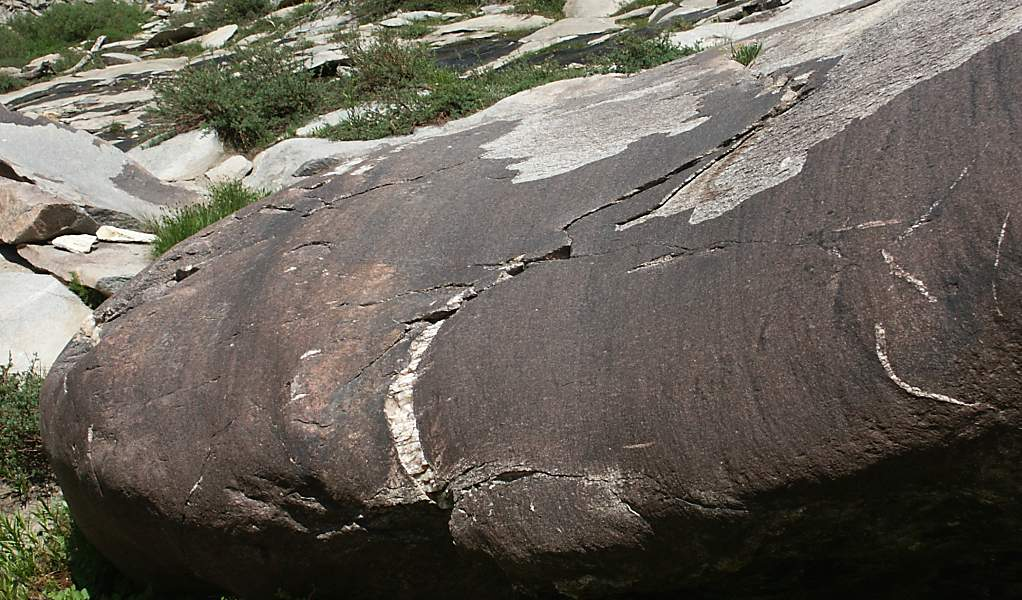
Glacial striations, patina, and sculptured granite near Seitz Lake

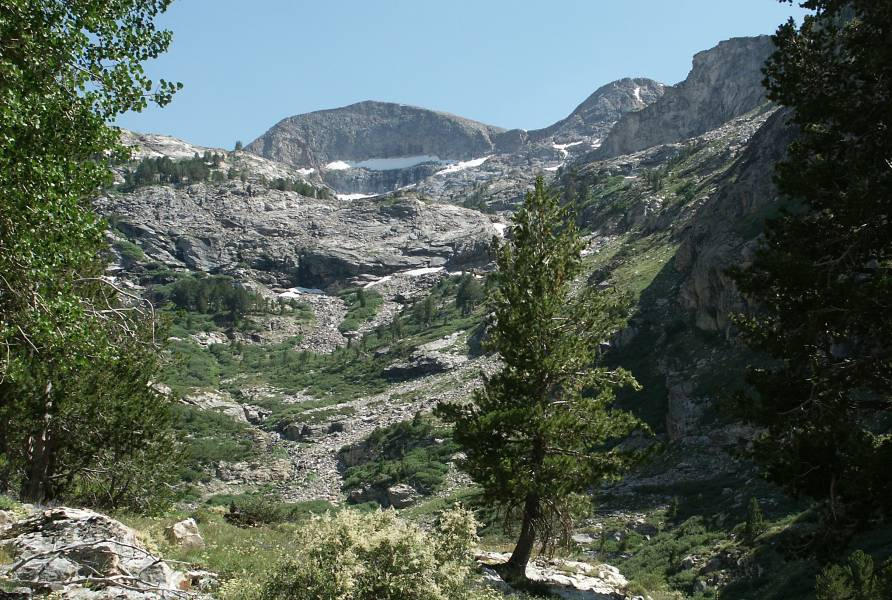
Ruby Dome, looking up the south fork of Seitz Canyon

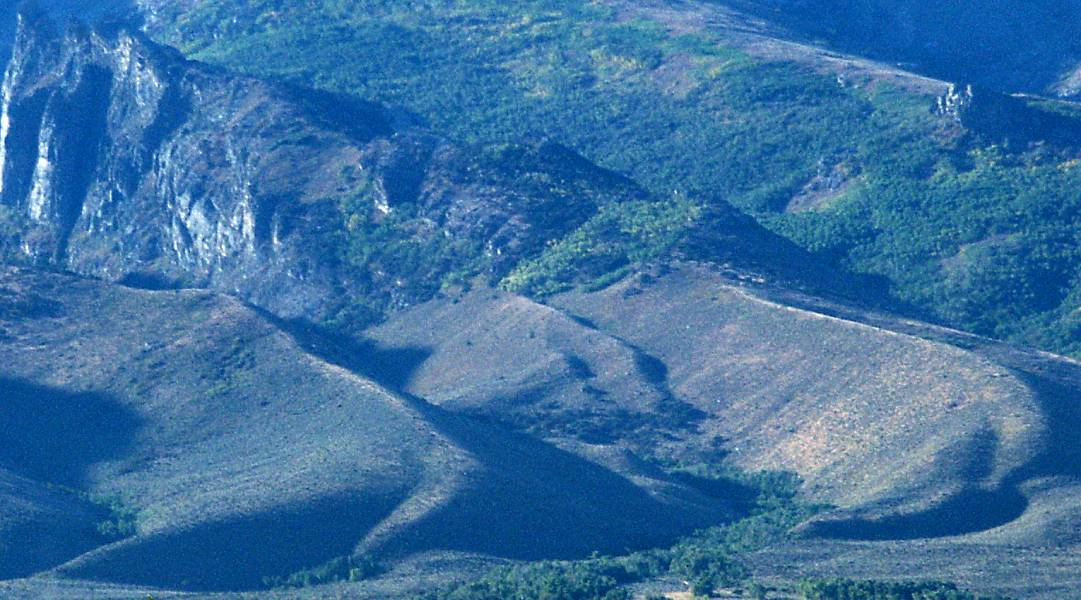
Lateral moraines at the mouth of Seitz Canyon
