= Seitz Lake (Nevada) =

Lake in Elko County, Nevada, US

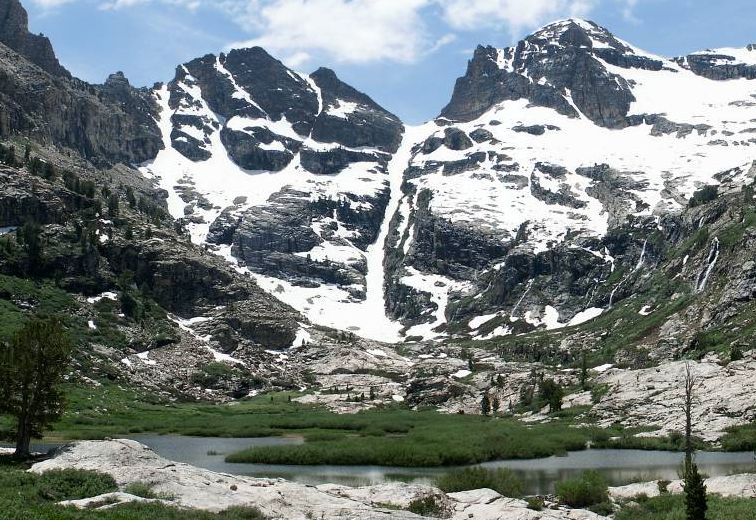

- Location in Nevada
- Location: Ruby Mountains, Elko County, Nevada
- Coordinates: 40°38′12″N 115°27′24″W
- Type: tarn
- Primary outflows: Rabbit Creek
- Basin countries: United States
- Surface area: 17 acres (6.9 ha)
- Max. depth: 20 ft (6.1 m)
- Surface elevation: 8,915 ft (2,717 m)

Seitz Lake is a glacial tarn in the Ruby Mountains, in Elko County in the northeastern part of the state of Nevada. It is located near the head of Seitz Canyon at approximately 40°38.2′N 115°27.4′W, and at an elevation of 8,915 feet (2,717 meters). It has an area of approximately 17 acres (6.9 hectares), and a depth of up to 20 feet (6.1 meters).

Seitz Lake is a major source of flow to Rabbit Creek (formerly known as Seitz Creek), which after exiting the mountains passes near the community of Spring Creek, meanders down Lamoille Valley, and then merges with the main branch of the Humboldt River between Halleck and Elburz, Nevada.

The lake was named after brothers George and Edward Seitz, who were early ranchers in Pleasant Valley. George eventually left the area, but Ed Seitz became the sheriff of Elko County in 1869.
