= Soldier Lakes (Nevada) =

Lake in Elko County, Nevada, United States

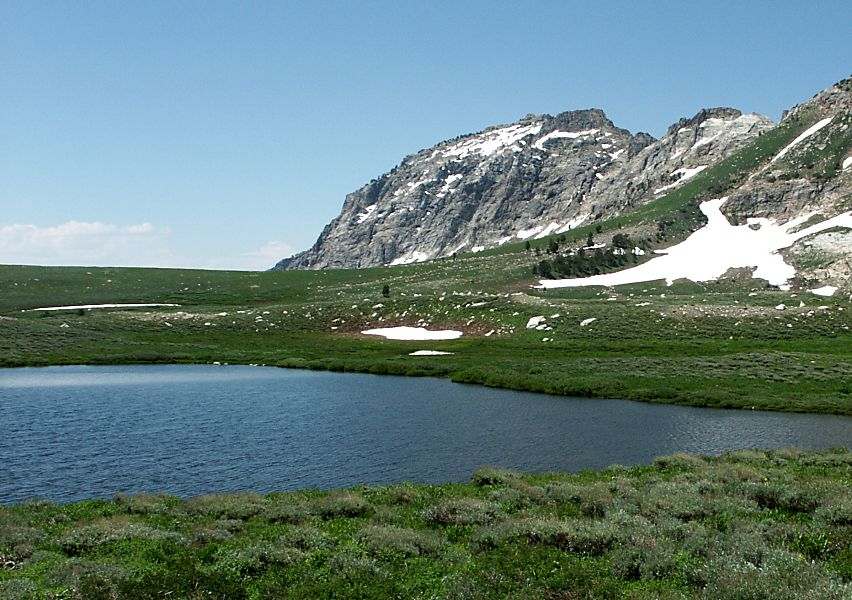
- The larger of the Soldier Lakes, and the Ruby Crest

- Location within Nevada
- Location: Ruby Mountains
- Coordinates: 40°44.1′N 115°16.4′W
- Type: Tarn
- Etymology: Soldier Basin
- Primary outflows: Soldier Creek; Humboldt River
- Basin countries: United States
- Surface area: 6 acres (2.4 ha)
- Max. depth: 14 feet (4.3 m)
- Surface elevation: 9,100 feet (2,800 m)

The Soldier Lakes are a cluster of more than a dozen glacial tarns in the Ruby Mountains, in Elko County in the northeastern part of the state of Nevada. They are located on the shelf of Soldier Basin on the eastern side of the mountains (although draining to the west via Soldier Creek) at an elevation of 9,100 feet (2,800 m). They have a combined area of approximately 6 acres (2.4 ha), and a depth of up to 14 feet (4.3 m).

The Soldier Lakes are some of the sources of Soldier Creek, which flows from the eastern side of the Ruby Mountains through Soldier Canyon, exits the mountains to the west into Lamoille Valley, and then merges with the main branch of the Humboldt River.
