= Ruby Mountains =

Mountain range in Nevada, United States

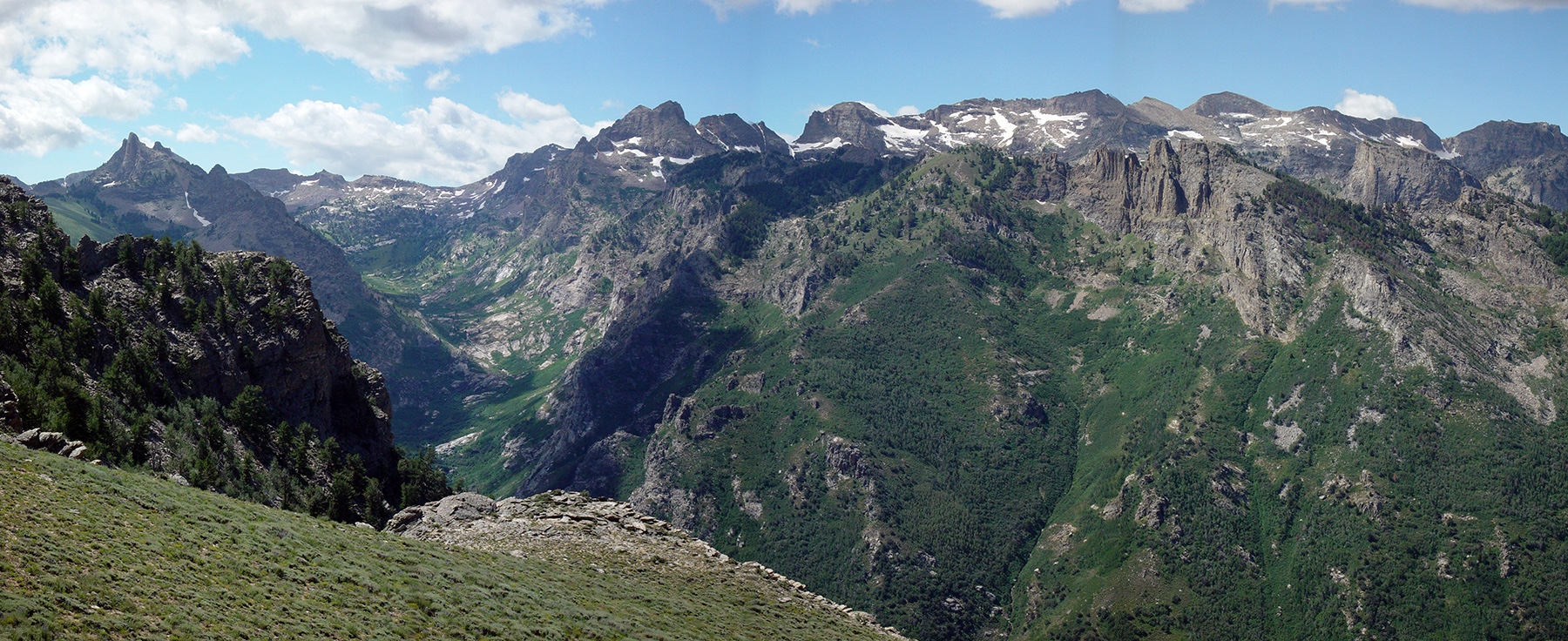
- Peaks around Ruby Dome

Highest point
- Peak: Ruby Dome
- Elevation: 11,387 ft (3,471 m)
- Coordinates: 40°37′18″N 115°28′31″W

Dimensions
- Length: 80 mi (130 km) North-South
- Width: 11 mi (18 km)

Geography
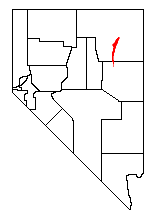
- Location of the Ruby Mountains within Nevada
- Country: United States
- State: Nevada
- County: Elko

The Ruby Mountains (Shoshoni: 'Duka Doya', meaning “Snowcapped”) are a mountain range, primarily located within Elko County with a small extension into White Pine County, in Nevada, United States. Most of the range is included within the Humboldt-Toiyabe National Forest. The range reaches a maximum elevation of 11,387 feet (3,471 m) on the summit of Ruby Dome. To the north is Secret Pass and the East Humboldt Range, and from there the Rubies run south-southwest for about 80 miles (130 km). To the east lies Ruby Valley, and to the west lie Huntington and Lamoille Valleys. The Ruby Mountains are the only range of an introduced bird, the Himalayan snowcock, in North America. The mountain range was named after the garnets found by early explorers. The central core of the range shows extensive evidence of glaciation during recent ice ages, including U-shaped canyons, moraines, hanging valleys, and steeply carved granite mountains, cliffs, and cirques.

== Major features ==
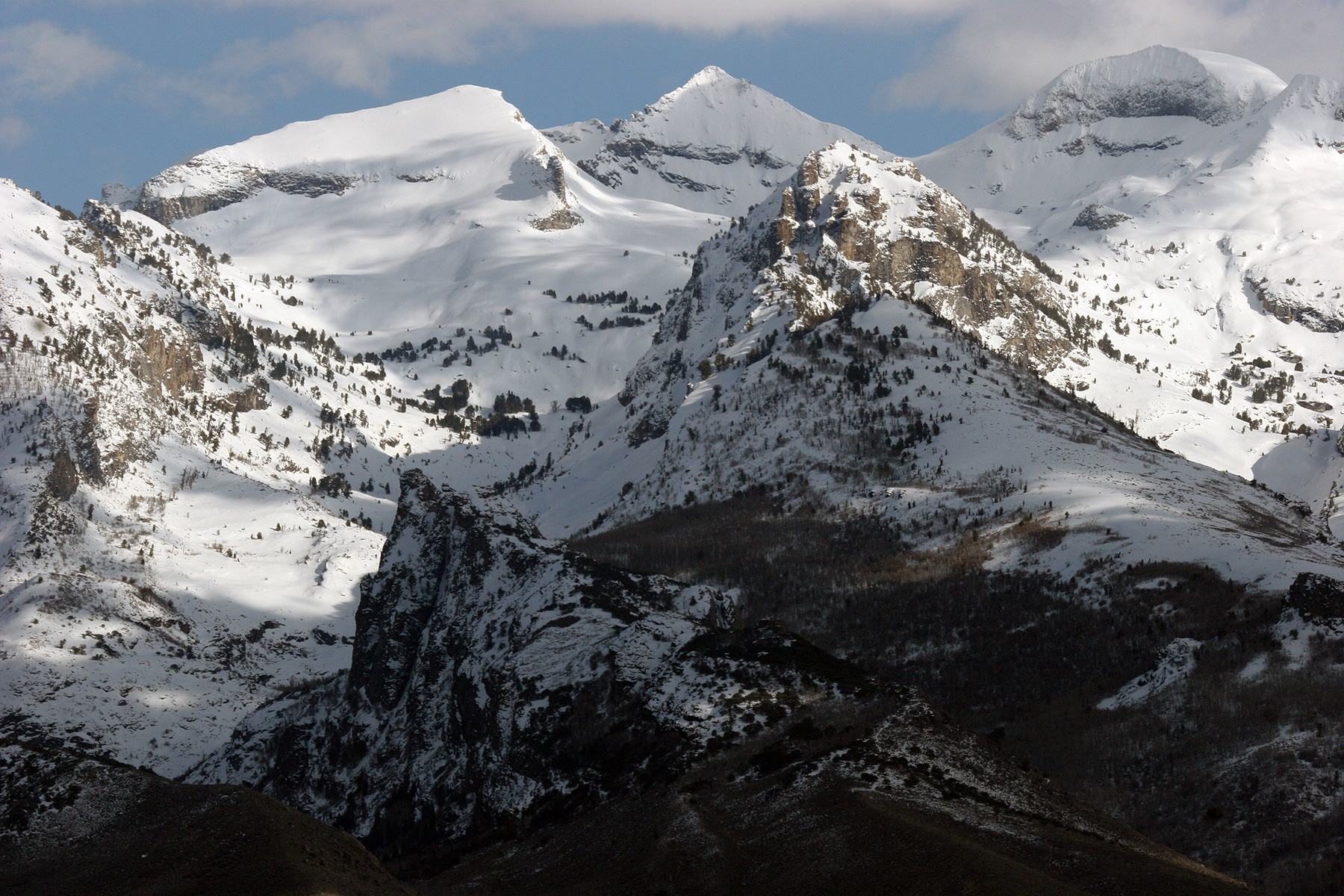
Highest Peaks with Ruby Dome on right, photo from Spring Creek

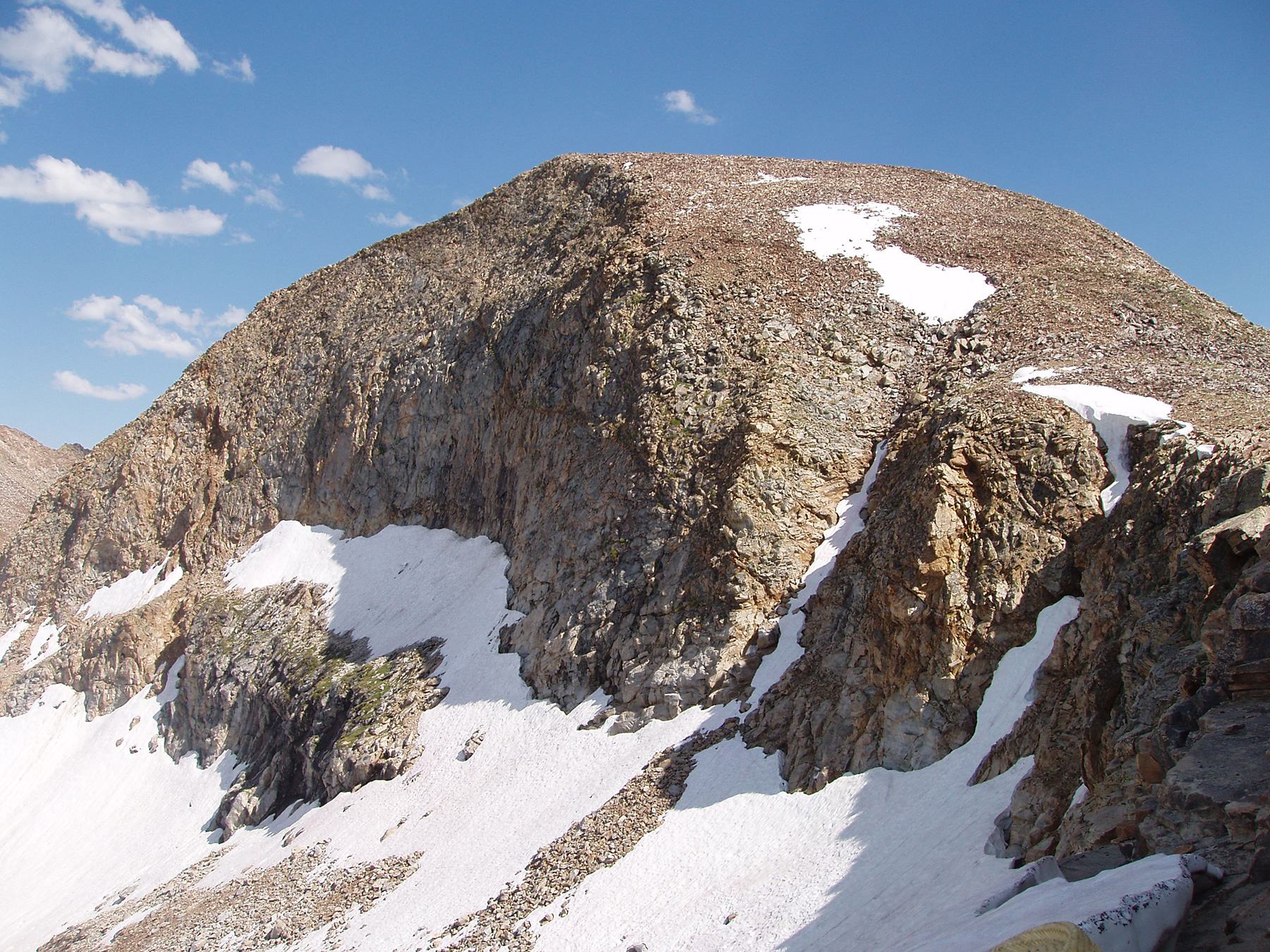
Ruby Dome from the base of the North Face. The normal ascent is on the slopes to the right (west)

Major valleys include Lamoille Canyon (and its branches Thomas and Right Fork Canyons), Seitz Canyon, Box Canyon and Kleckner Canyon. Canyons to the north drain into the main stem of the Humboldt River above Elko, while a group of canyons above the Te-Moak tribal lands constitute the headwaters of the South Fork of the Humboldt River. Major summits in the central core of the range include Ruby Dome, Thomas Peak, Liberty Peak, Mount Fitzgerald, Verdi Peak, Snow Lake Peak, Mount Silliman, and Mount Gilbert. Prominent peaks further south include King, Lake, Wines, Tipton, and Pearl Peaks. North of the central core, significant peaks include Old-Man-of-the-Mountain and Soldier Peak.

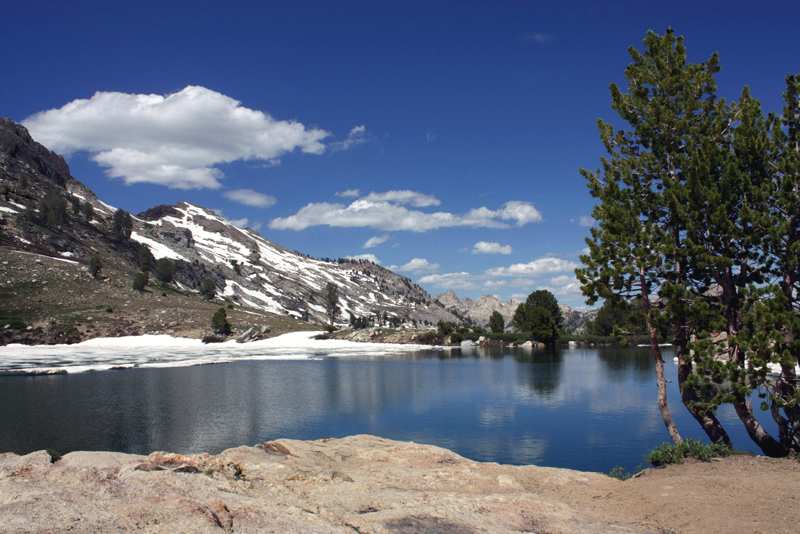
Lamoille Lake

Glaciers gouged out basins that are now alpine lakes. The larger of these, all located in the central core of the range, include Echo, Liberty, Favre, Lamoille, Castle, and Griswold lakes, while smaller tarns also in the central core include the scenic Island, Dollar, Verdi, Snow, Box, and Seitz lakes. Further to the north are Cold, Hidden, Soldier, and Robinson lakes, while to the south are North Furlong and Overland lakes. Water collected by the southern section of the Rubies seeps into the adjacent Ruby Valley to form the Ruby Lake National Wildlife Refuge.

== Ecology ==
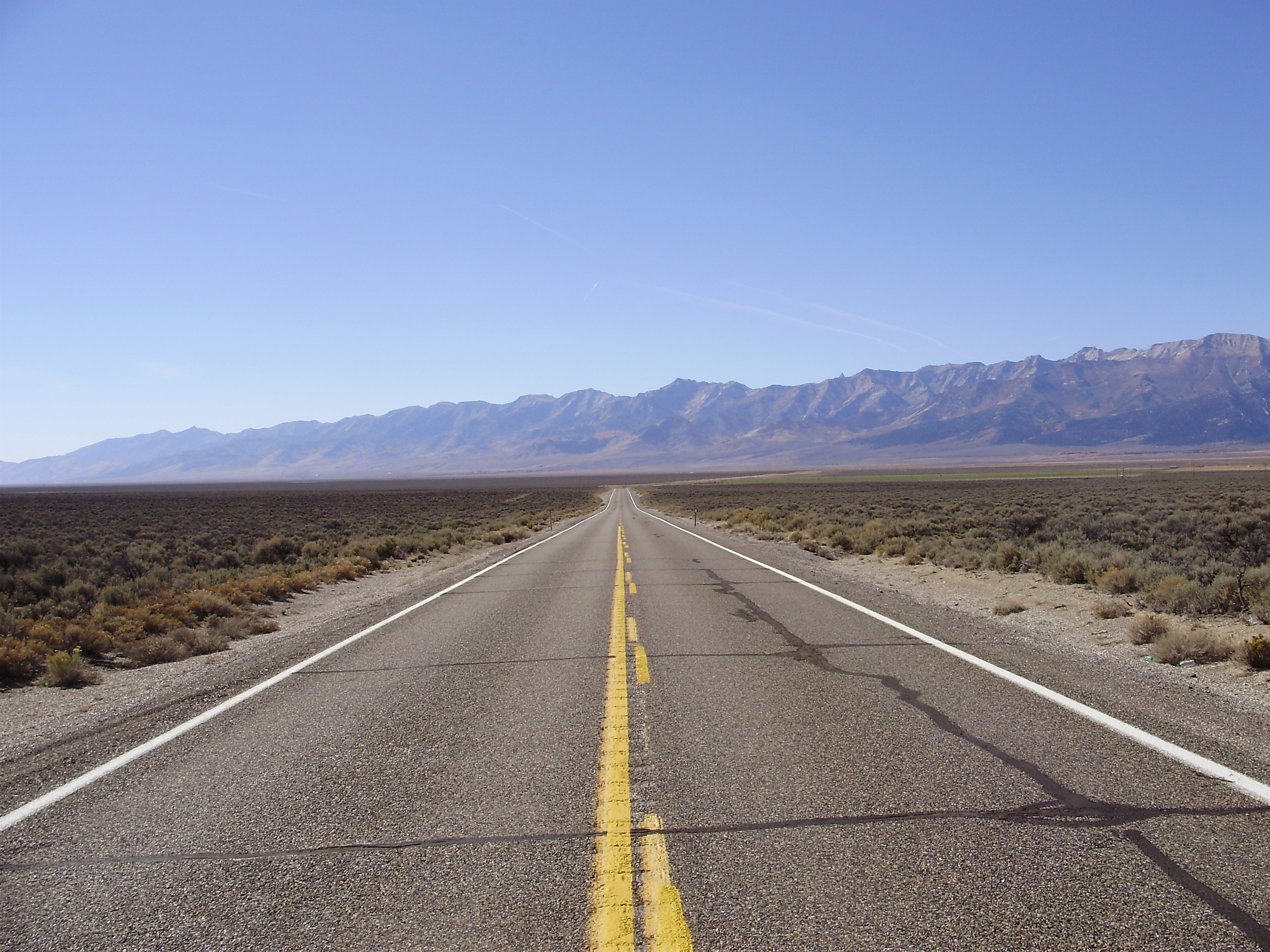
The eastern slopes of the Ruby Mountains viewed from SR 229 in Ruby Valley

The eastern Great Basin is wetter than the western part in the rain shadow of the Sierra Nevada range. Moisture collected by this high range promoted the heavy Pleistocene glaciation and still supports a wide variety of flora and fauna. Lower elevations are covered by aspen trees, while higher up the whitebark and limber pines predominate. Mountain goats, bighorn sheep, mule deer, mountain lions, marmots, beaver, and pikas are common residents, and the mule deer population is reportedly the largest in Nevada. A population of Himalayan snowcock was introduced from Pakistan, and is thriving among the high cliffs. Streams, particularly on the western slopes have populations of native Lahontan or Humboldt cutthroat trout, but many of these populations are hybridized with rainbow trout or have been displaced by brown and brook trout, all stocked for angling purposes before impacts on native trout species were well understood.

== Geology ==
The Ruby Mountains are part of the Basin and Range Province that formed partly due to extension of the North American Plate. Normal faults on the eastern and western flanks of the range separate it from the basins on either side of it. The Ruby Mountains are an example of a metamorphic core complex that formed during the Cretaceous-Paleogene time when the oceanic Farallon Plate was subducting underneath the North American plate causing crustal thickening throughout Nevada and Utah. The weight from the thickening crust increased temperatures and pressures up to 40 km at depth and caused regional metamorphism to occur, as well as the formation of some migmatic igneous bodies. During the Oligocene to Eocene, active subduction was no longer occurring and the upper crust relaxed causing the stress to change from compressional to extensional. The extensional force caused the middle and lower crustal rocks to be exhumed to the surface as part of the Basin and Range Province along the footwall of a large detachment fault. A mylonitic shear zone can be traced along the fault on the western margin of the Ruby Mountains, marking the contact between the igneous and metamorphic rocks in the core complex and the undeformed sedimentary rocks around it. Generally deeper rocks are exposed in the northern part of the Ruby Mountains than in the south.

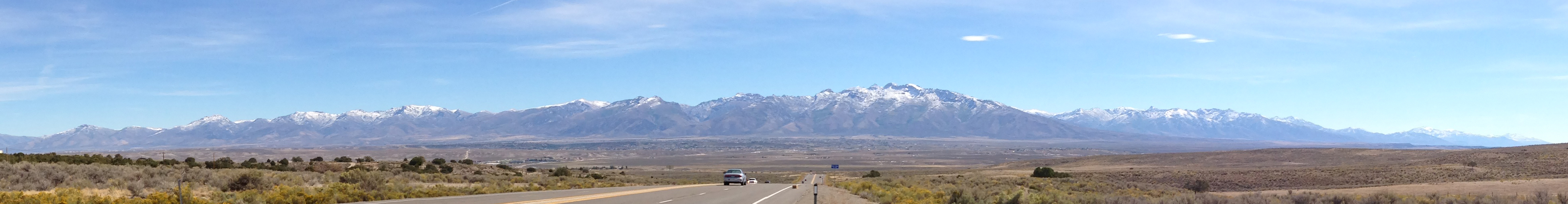
Panorama of the Ruby Mountains from Lamoille Summit on Nevada State Route 227

== Wilderness area ==
The higher altitude sections of the range were designated as the 90,000 acres (36,000 ha) Ruby Mountains Wilderness Area in 1989. The isolated Seitz and Echo Canyons are further preserved as an ecologically special Research Natural Area.

The Ruby Crest National Recreation Trail winds from Harrison Pass northward about 40 mi (64 km) to the Road's End Trailhead high in Lamoille Canyon. Principal recreational access can be found at Lamoille and Soldier Canyons on the west side of the range, and at the Overland Lake Trailhead to the east.

== In popular culture ==
- An opening title in the 2006 film Seraphim Falls places the first scenes in the Ruby Mountains.
- In 1994, Frank Wells died in a helicopter crash after skiing in the Ruby Mountains.
- The game White Knuckle takes place in a megastructure discovered under the Ruby Mountains.
