= Robinson Lake (Nevada) =

Lake in Nevada, United States

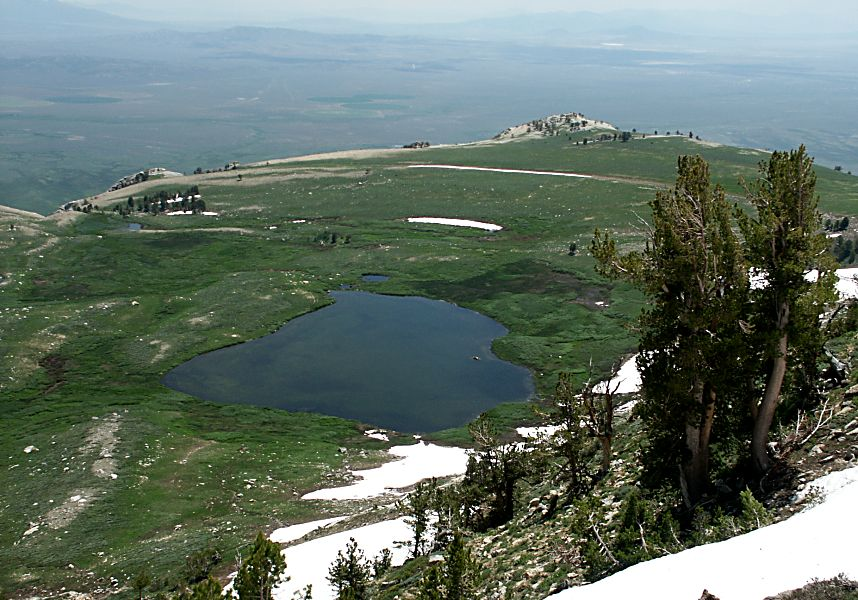

- Location in Nevada
- Location: Ruby Mountains, Elko County, Nevada
- Coordinates: 40°43′48″N 115°16′48″W
- Type: tarn
- Basin countries: United States
- Surface area: 17 acres (6.9 ha)
- Max. depth: 5 ft (1.5 m)
- Surface elevation: 9,194 ft (2,802 m)

Robinson Lake is a glacial tarn in the Ruby Mountains, in Elko County in the northeastern part of the state of Nevada. It is located just south of the shelf of Soldier Basin, and at an elevation of 9,194 feet (2,802 meters). It has an area of approximately 17 acres (6.9 hectares), and a depth of up to 5 feet (1.5 meters). The lake is the source for Robinson Creek, which drops steeply to the east into Ruby Valley. Both were named for a family of early settlers in Ruby Valley. The lake is a fishing spot for brook trout.
