= South Fork Humboldt River =

River in Nevada, United States

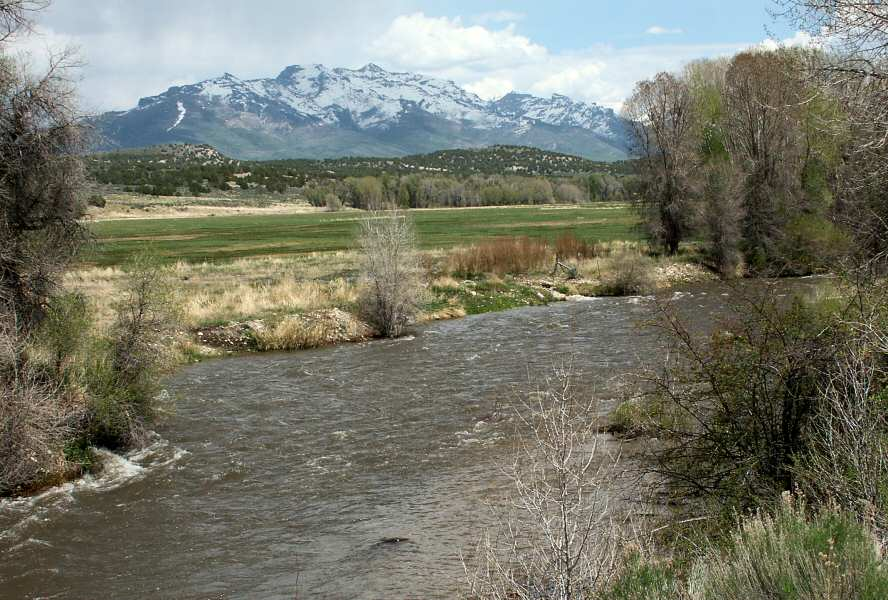
- South Fork and its source, the Ruby Mountains,

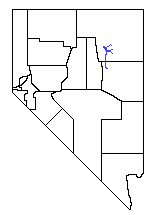
- Location of the South Fork of the Humboldt River within Nevada

Location
- Country: United States
- State: Nevada
- County: Elko

Physical characteristics
- Source
  - elevation: 5,775 ft (1,760 m)
- Mouth: Humboldt River
  - coordinates: 40°46.3′N 115°53.3′W
  - elevation: 4,998 ft (1,523 m)
- Length: 38 mi (61 km)

Basin features
- River system: Humboldt River

The South Fork Humboldt River is a river in Elko County, Nevada, United States.

== Description ==
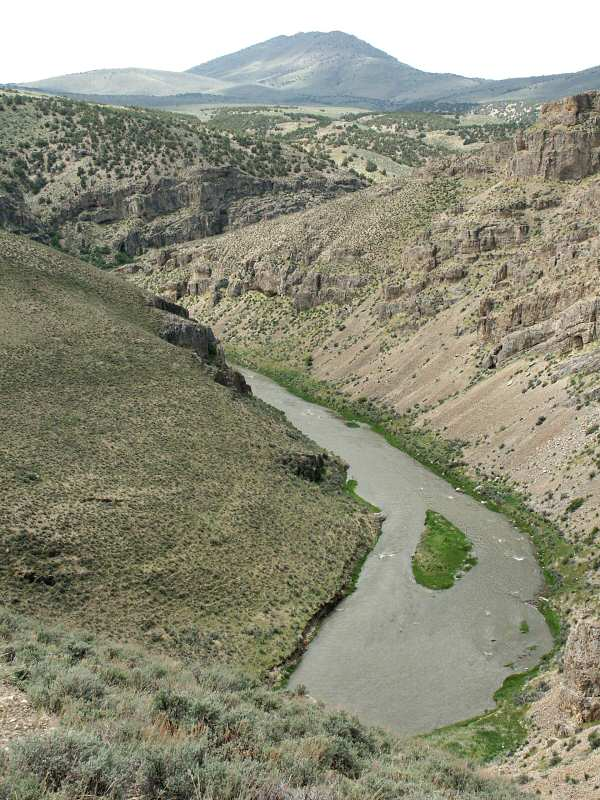
South Fork Canyon, looking south

The river originates in a fan-shaped group of canyons draining the western slopes of the Ruby Mountains in northeastern Nevada. These headwaters run from Ruby Dome south to King Peak and include Echo, Box, Kleckner, North Furlong, Long, Segunda, Drown, and Rattlesnake Canyons. Streams draining these canyons exit the mountains and converge at an elevation of 5,775 feet (1,760 m), near the town of Lee and within the tribal lands of the Te-Moak tribe of the South Fork Band of the Western Shoshone.

Continuing its northwest course, the river merges with the flow of Huntington Creek, passes through the historic area of Twin Bridges, and then enters the more recent South Fork Reservoir, State Park, and South Fork Dam dating from 1988. It then passes through South Fork Canyon, which merges with Tenmile and Dixie creeks' flows. It was here that, on September 25, 1846, the Donner Party wagon train completed the segment of their journey on the Hastings Cutoff, and rejoined the original California Trail.

After an estimated total of 38 miles (61 km), the South Fork flows into the main branch of the Humboldt River at approximately 40°46.3′N 115°53.3′W and at an elevation of 4,998 feet (1,523 m), about 7 miles (11 km) southwest of the city of Elko.

== See also ==
- List of rivers in Nevada
