= Snow Lake (Nevada) =

Lake in Nevada, United States

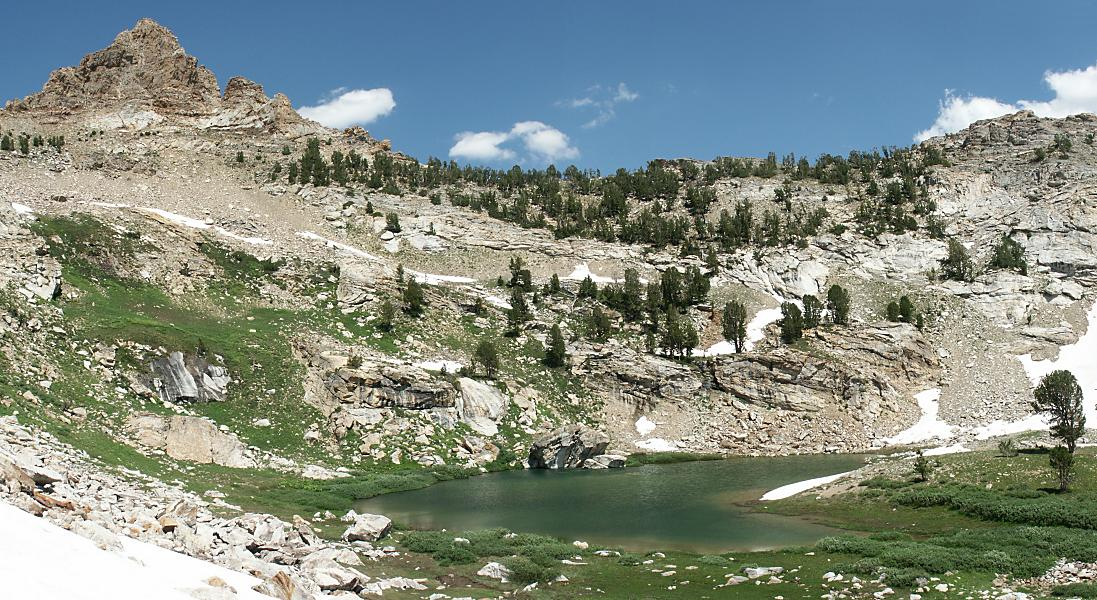

- Location in Nevada
- Location: Ruby Mountains, Elko County, Nevada
- Coordinates: 40°36′06″N 115°24′00″W
- Type: tarn
- Basin countries: United States
- Surface elevation: 10,136 ft (3,089 m)

Snow Lake is a glacial tarn in the Ruby Mountains, in Elko County in the northeastern part of the state of Nevada. It is located at the head of Box Canyon just south of Snow Lake Peak and at an elevation of 10,136 feet (3,089 m).
