= Lamoille =

Lamoille or La Moille may refer to:

== Places in the United States ==
=== Illinois ===
- La Moille, Illinois, a village
- Lamoille Township, Bureau County, Illinois

=== Iowa ===
- LaMoille, Iowa, an unincorporated community

=== Minnesota ===
- Lamoille, Minnesota, an unincorporated community

=== Nevada ===
- Lamoille, Nevada, a census designated place
- Lamoille Canyon, a valley in the Ruby Mountains
  - Lamoille Canyon Road, a scenic byway through the canyon
  - Lamoille Lake, a glacial tarn in the canyon
- Lamoille Organization Camp, a camping facility
- Nevada State Route 227, signed partially as Lamoille Highway

=== Vermont ===
- Lamoille County, Vermont
- Lamoille River, a river in northern Vermont and the namesake of all other places with the name
  - Lamoille River Route 15-A Bridge, a steel and concrete bridge crossing the river
- Lamoille Union High School, a public secondary school in Hyde Park
