= Lake Peak (Nevada) =

Mountain in Nevada, United States

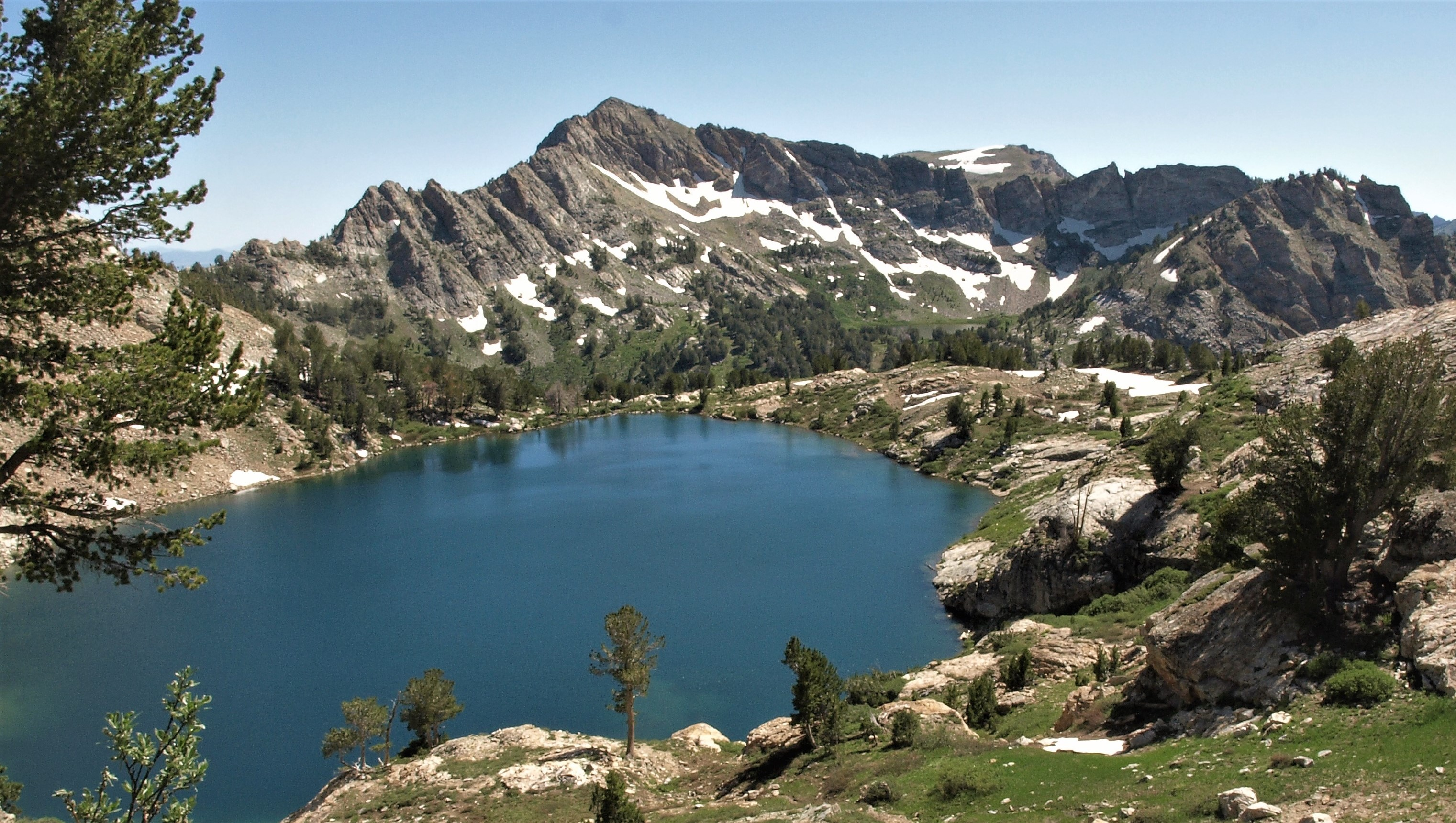
- North aspect, with Liberty Lake

Highest point
- Elevation: 10,922 ft (3,329 m)
- Prominence: 682 ft (208 m)
- Parent peak: Wines Peak (10,940 ft)
- Isolation: 1.16 mi (1.87 km)
- Coordinates: 40°33′49″N 115°23′42″W

Geography
- Location within Nevada Location within the United States
- Location: Ruby Mountains Wilderness
- Country: United States of America
- State: Nevada
- County: Elko
- Parent range: Ruby Mountains; Great Basin Ranges
- Topo map: USGS Ruby Dome

Geology
- Mountain type: Fault block

Climbing
- Easiest route: class 2 hiking

Lake Peak is a 10,922-foot elevation (3,329 m) summit located in Elko County, Nevada, United States.

== Description ==
Lake Peak is part of the Ruby Mountains which are a subset of the Great Basin Ranges. This peak is set within the Ruby Mountains Wilderness which is managed by the Humboldt–Toiyabe National Forest. It is situated 1.5 miles (2.4 km) northeast of line parent Wines Peak, one mile (1.6 km) south of Liberty Lake, one-half mile (0.8 km) south of Favre Lake, and immediately southeast above Castle Lake. Precipitation runoff from the mountain's west slope drains to South Fork Humboldt River via Kleckner and North Furlong Creeks, whereas the east slope drains to the Franklin River in Ruby Valley. Topographic relief is significant as the summit rises 4,700 feet (1,400 meters) above Ruby Valley in four miles (6.4 km). An approach option to climb the peak is made from Lamoille Canyon via the Ruby Crest National Recreation Trail which traverses the peak's west slope. This landform's toponym has been officially adopted by the U.S. Board on Geographic Names.

== Climate ==
Lake Peak is set within the Great Basin Desert which has hot summers and cold winters. The desert is an example of a cold desert climate as the desert's elevation makes temperatures cooler than lower elevation deserts. Due to the high elevation and aridity, temperatures drop sharply after sunset. Summer nights are comfortably cool. Winter highs are generally above freezing, and winter nights are bitterly cold, with temperatures often dropping well below freezing. Alpine climate characterizes the summit.

== Gallery ==
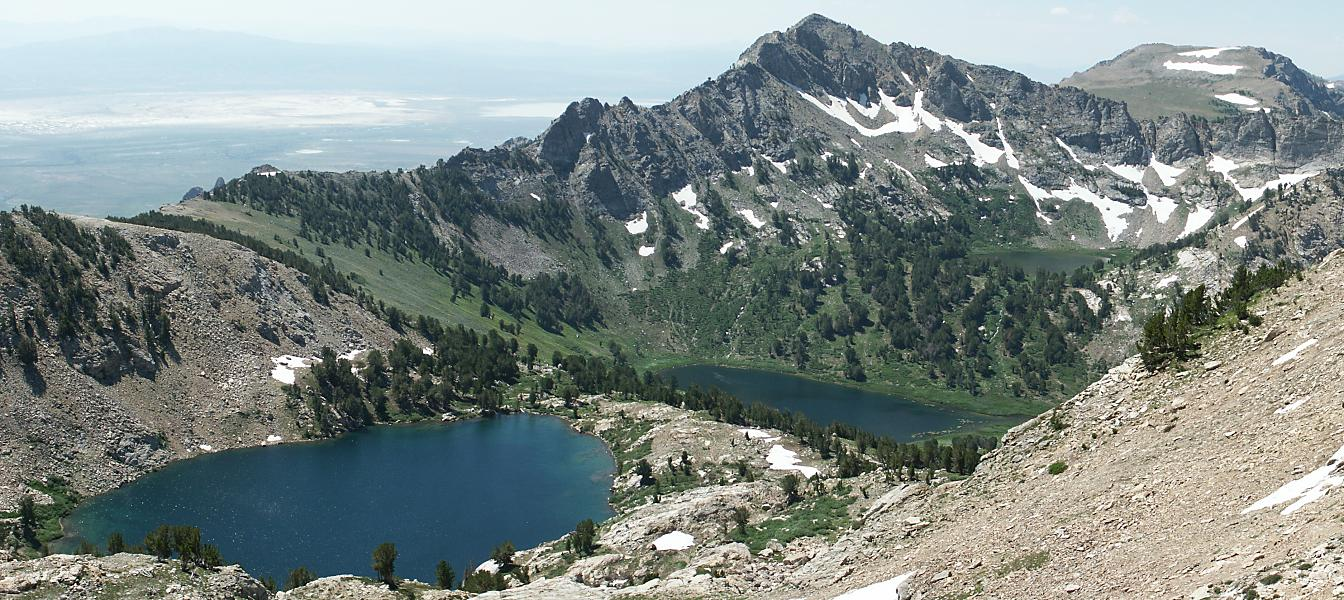
Liberty, Favre, and Castle lakes.
Lake Peak right of center with parent Wines Peak in upper right corner.

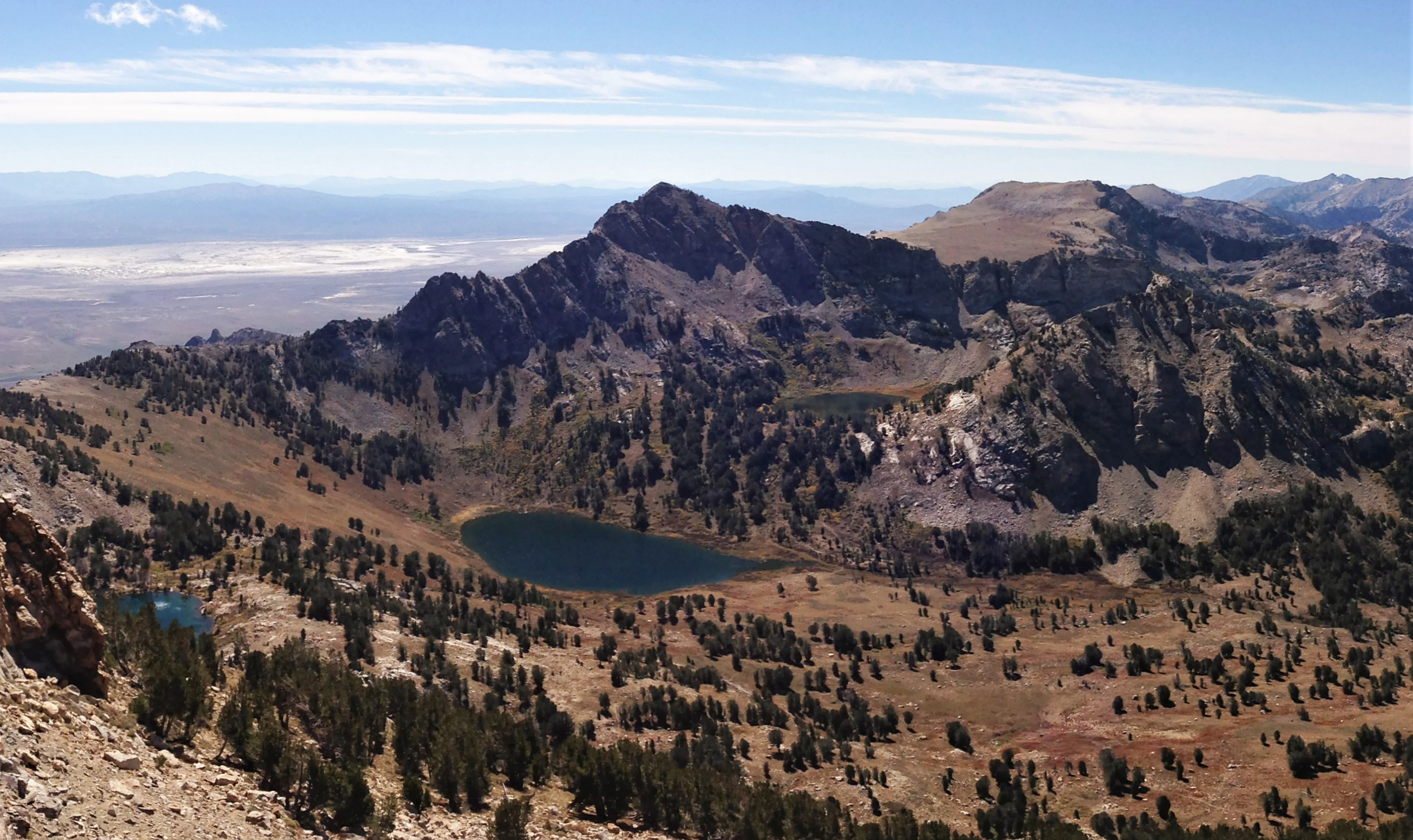
Lake Peak from Liberty Peak, with Wines Peak (right) and Ruby Valley (left).

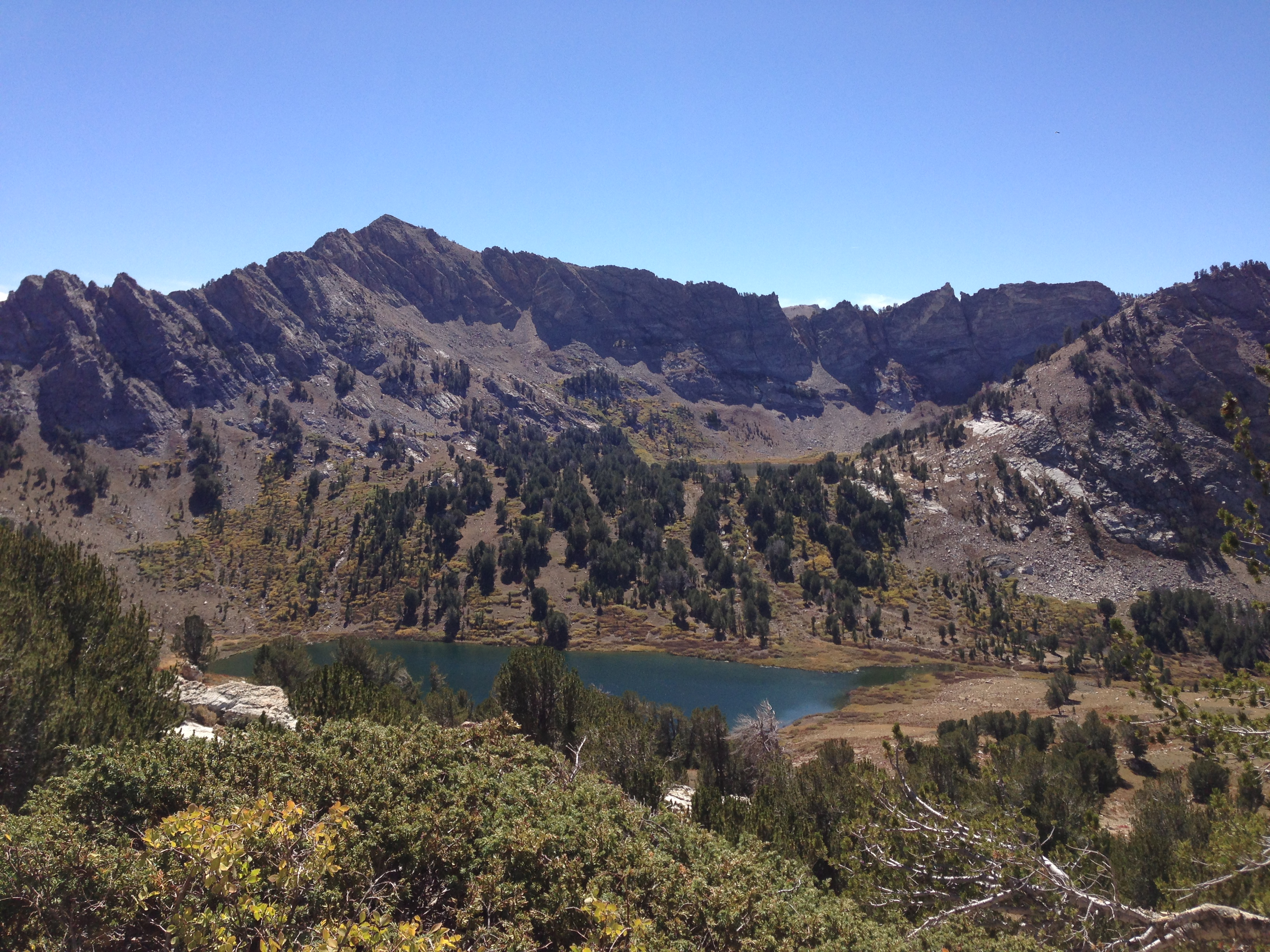
Lake Peak and Favre Lake

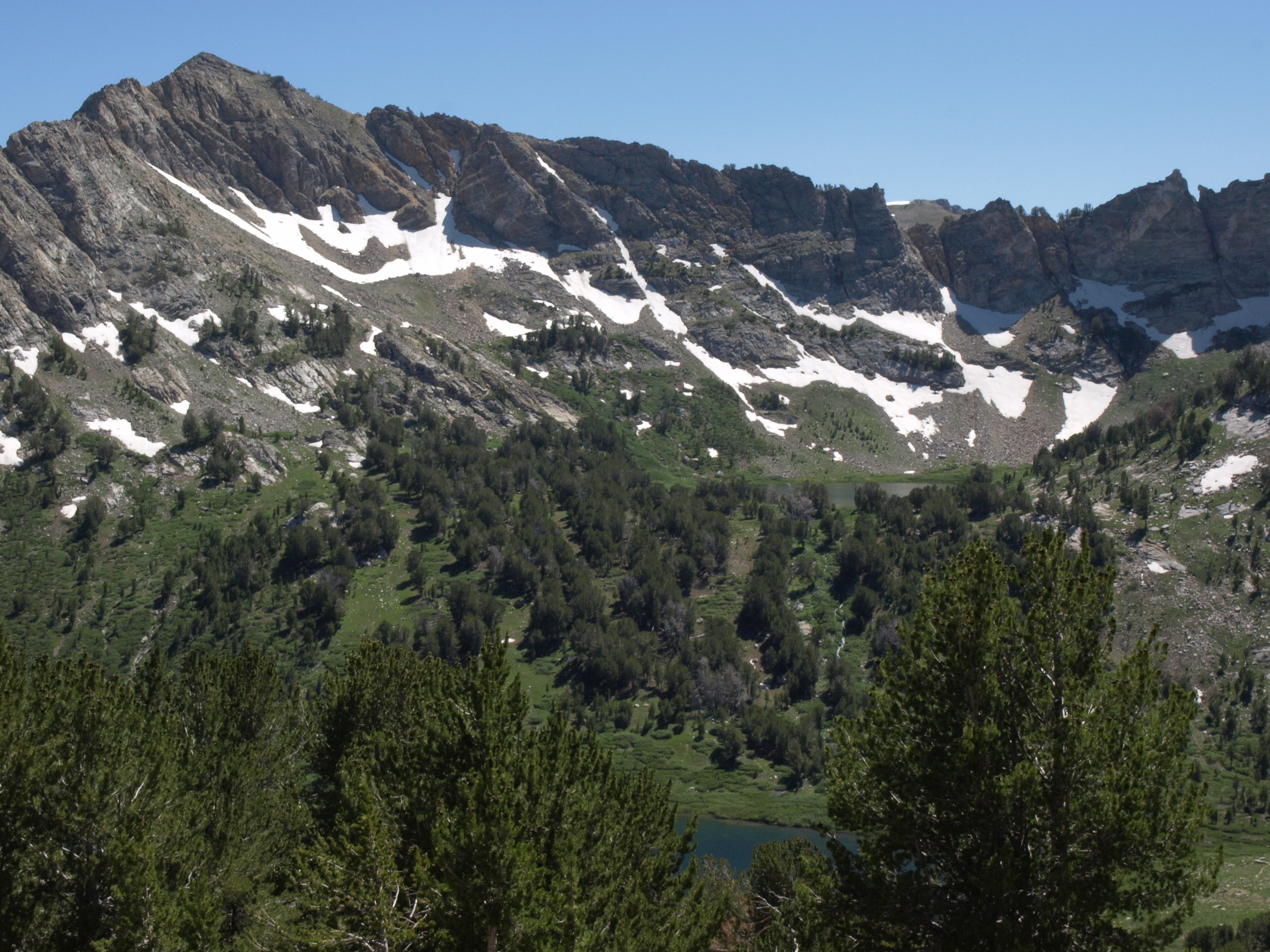
Lake Peak, Favre Lake (bottom) and Castle Lake (right of center)

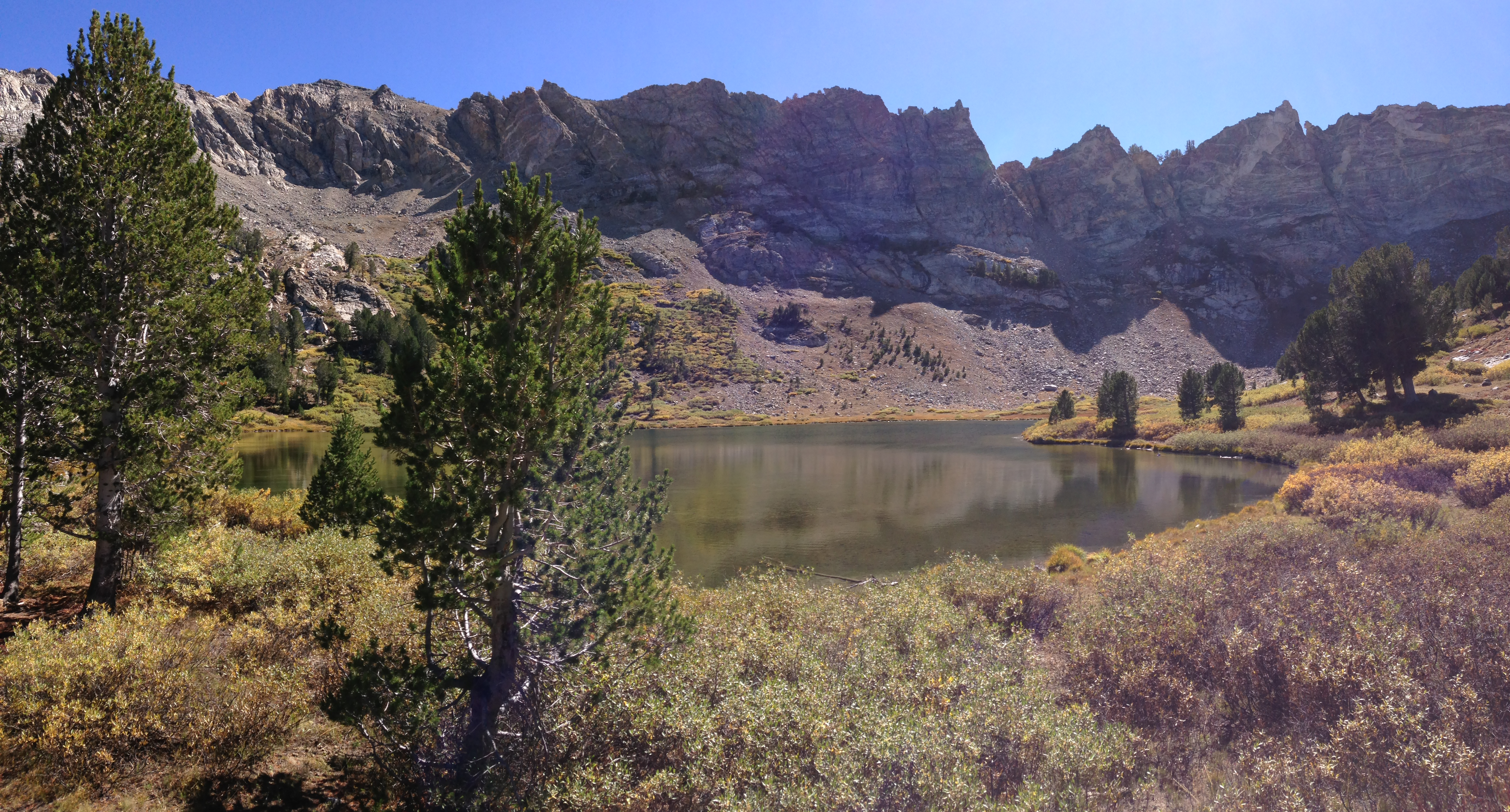
Castle Lake with summit of Lake Peak to left

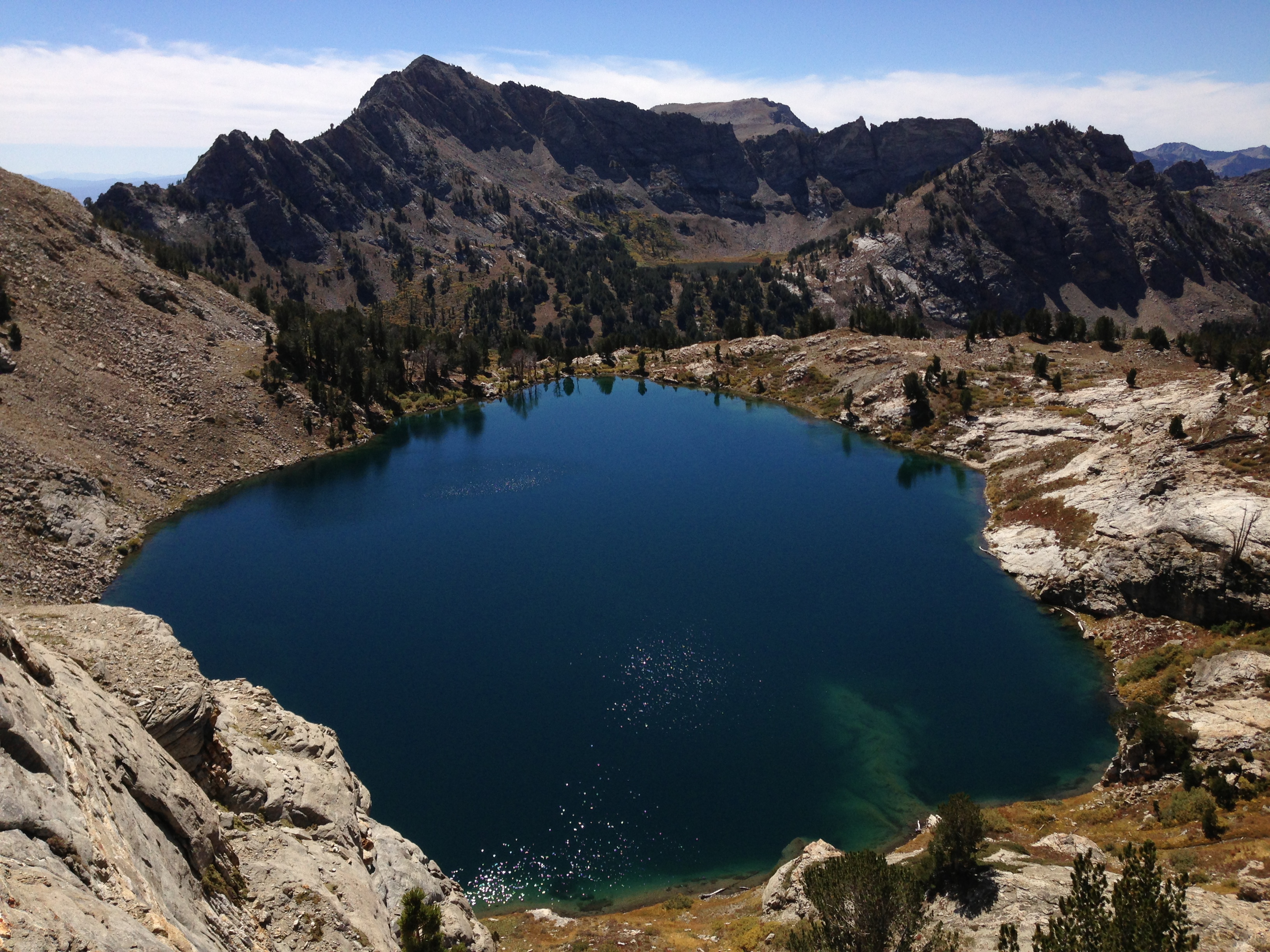
Liberty Lake and Lake Peak

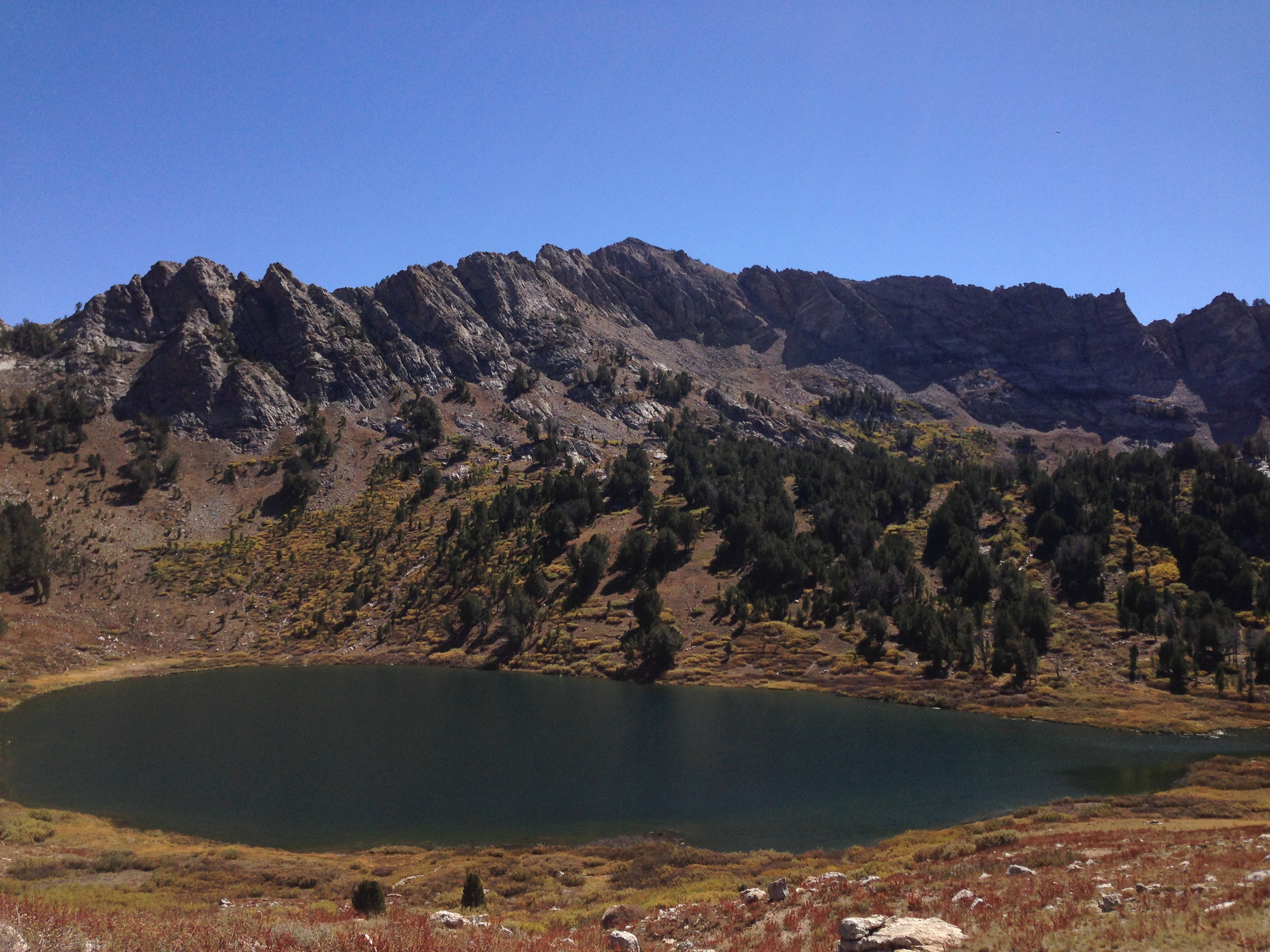
Favre Lake with Lake Peak

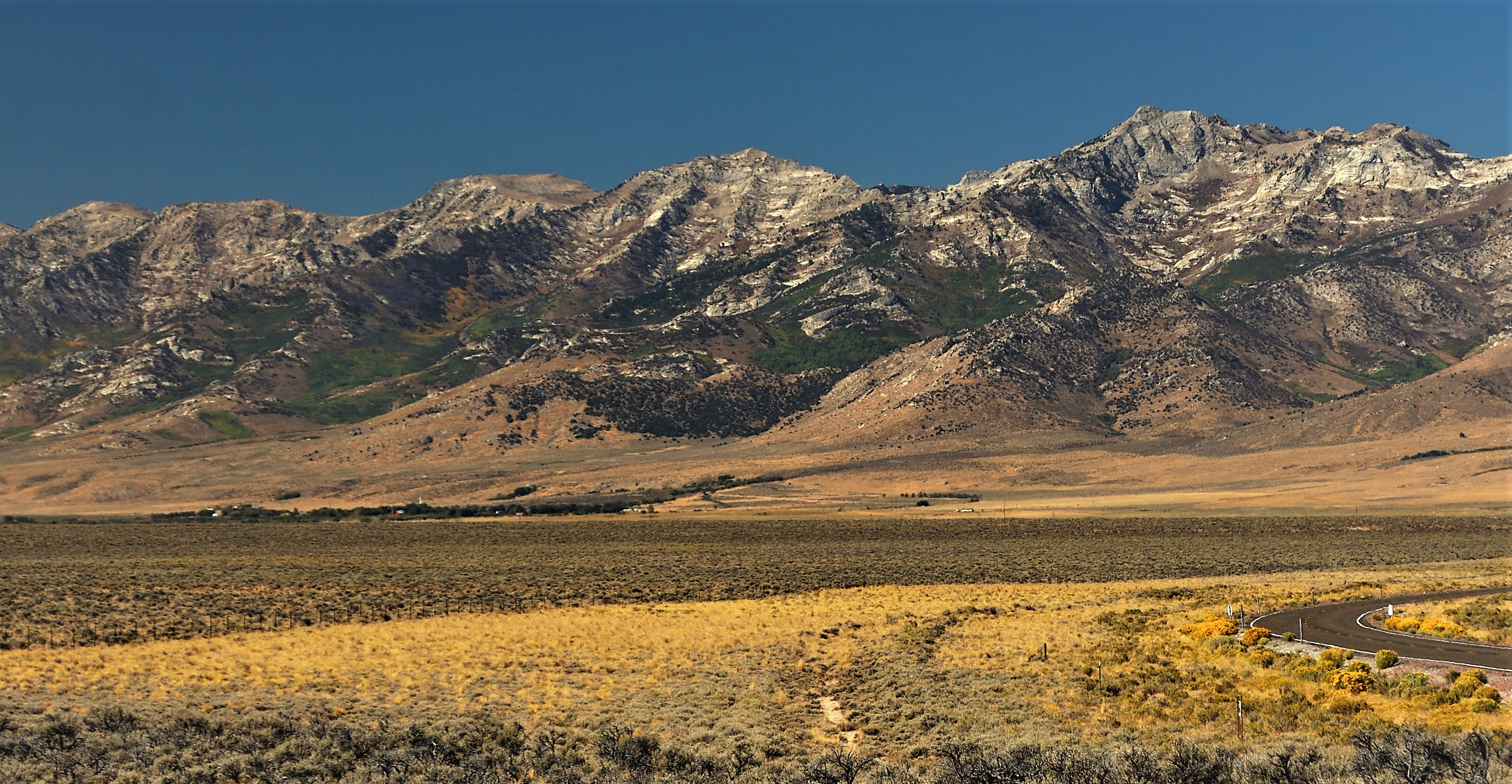
East aspect of Lake Peak (centered) from Ruby Valley

== See also ==
- List of mountain peaks of Nevada
- Great Basin
