= Thomas Peak =

Mountain in Nevada, United States

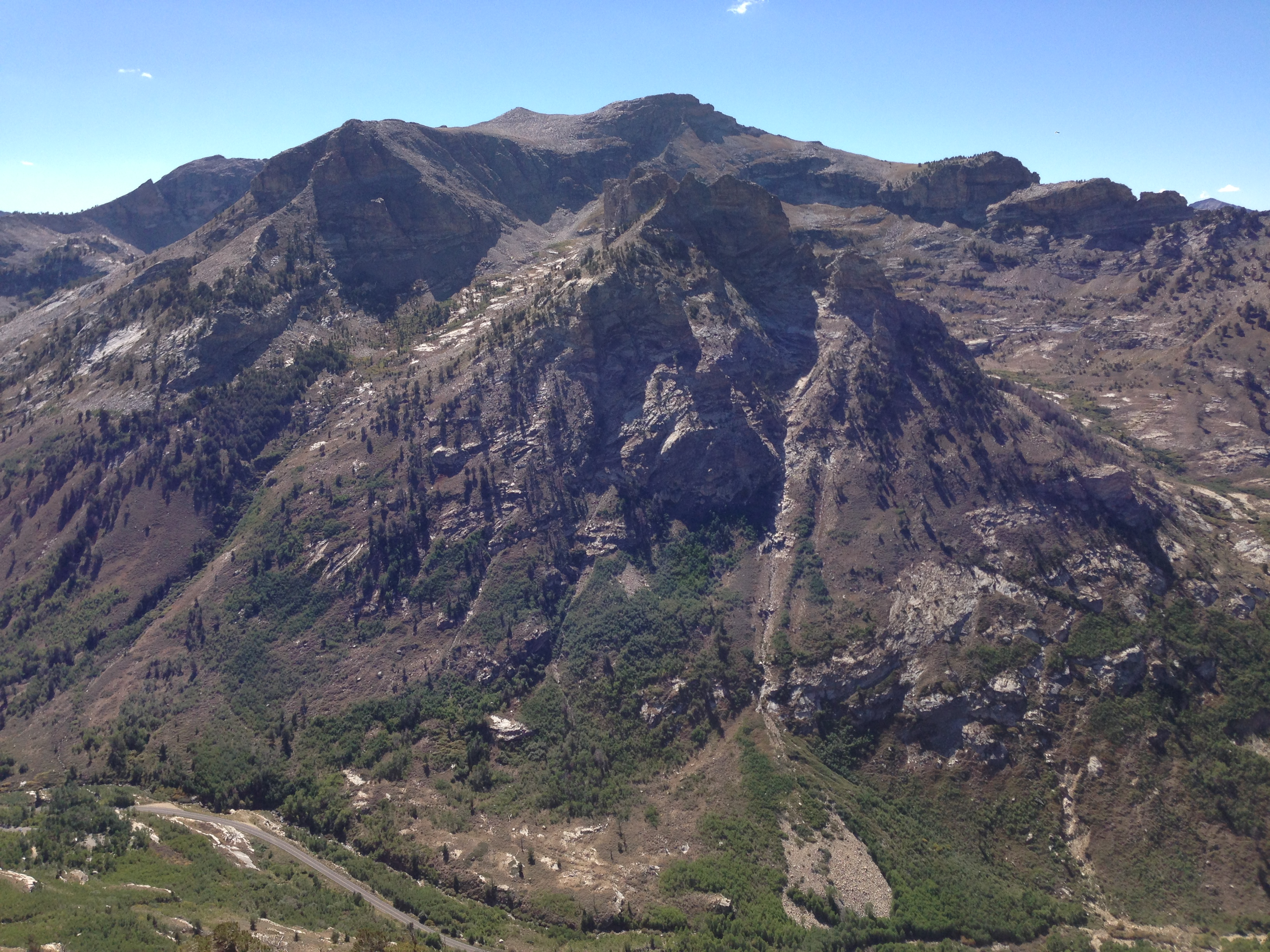
- Thomas Peak, viewed from Verdi Peak

Highest point
- Elevation: 11,321 ft (3,451 m) NAVD 88
- Prominence: 1,080 ft (329 m)
- Coordinates: 40°37′19″N 115°23′34″W

Geography
- Location within Nevada
- Location: Elko County, Nevada, U.S.
- Parent range: Ruby Mountains
- Topo map: USGS Ruby Dome

Climbing
- Easiest route: From Island Lake, Class 2 scramble north up an avalanche chute and then west along the ridgeline

Thomas Peak is the second highest named mountain in both the Ruby Mountains and Elko County, in Nevada, United States. It is the thirty-fourth highest mountain in the state. The peak is located about 24 miles (39 km) southeast of the city of Elko in the Ruby Mountains Wilderness, within the Ruby Mountains Ranger District of the Humboldt-Toiyabe National Forest. One of the most voluminous mountains in the range, its base makes up most of the east wall of Thomas Canyon, as well as the west wall of the long curved section of upper Lamoille Canyon.

Thomas Peak and the adjacent canyon and campground is named after Raymond Thomas, a teacher at Elko High School, who led a group of hikers into the canyon in October 1916. Caught in an early snowstorm, he died while assisting his party until rescuers could arrive.

== Climate ==
Climate data for Thomas Peak 40.6235 N, 115.3910 W, Elevation: 10,820 ft (3,300 m) (1991–2020 normals)
Month	Jan	Feb	Mar	Apr	May	Jun	Jul	Aug	Sep	Oct	Nov	Dec	Year
Mean daily maximum °F (°C)	28.1 (−2.2)	27.8 (−2.3)	32.7 (0.4)	35.9 (2.2)	45.0 (7.2)	56.4 (13.6)	66.6 (19.2)	65.6 (18.7)	57.0 (13.9)	44.5 (6.9)	34.1 (1.2)	27.5 (−2.5)	43.4 (6.4)
Daily mean °F (°C)	19.6 (−6.9)	18.7 (−7.4)	22.7 (−5.2)	26.1 (−3.3)	34.8 (1.6)	45.2 (7.3)	54.6 (12.6)	53.6 (12.0)	45.4 (7.4)	34.6 (1.4)	25.4 (−3.7)	19.2 (−7.1)	33.3 (0.7)
Mean daily minimum °F (°C)	11.1 (−11.6)	9.5 (−12.5)	12.7 (−10.7)	16.2 (−8.8)	24.6 (−4.1)	33.9 (1.1)	42.6 (5.9)	41.6 (5.3)	33.9 (1.1)	24.8 (−4.0)	16.7 (−8.5)	10.9 (−11.7)	23.2 (−4.9)
Average precipitation inches (mm)	7.39 (188)	4.49 (114)	4.69 (119)	5.46 (139)	4.74 (120)	2.15 (55)	0.82 (21)	0.92 (23)	1.96 (50)	3.07 (78)	4.31 (109)	6.02 (153)	46.02 (1,169)
Source: PRISM Climate Group

== Summit panorama ==
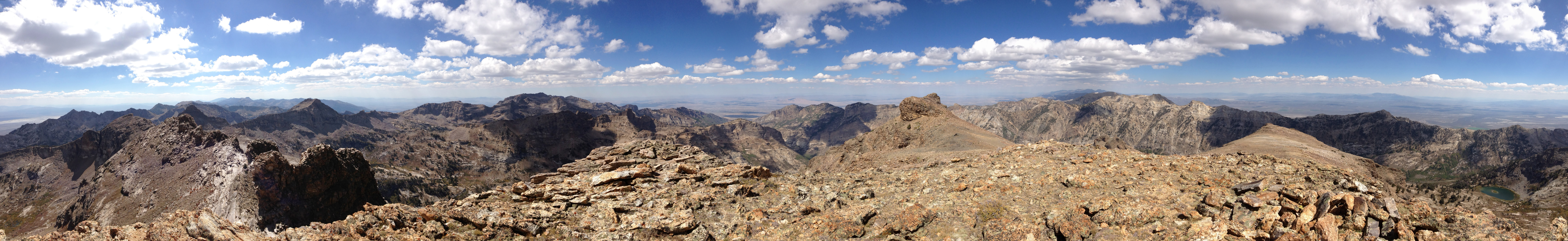
360-degree panorama from the summit of Thomas Peak
