= Verdi Lake (Nevada) =

Lake in Nevada, United States

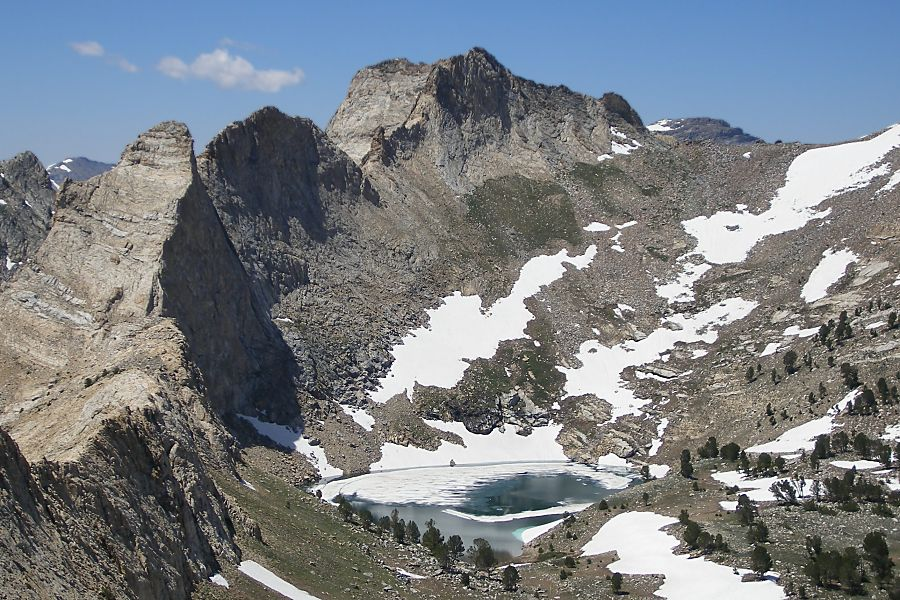

- Location in Nevada
- Location: Ruby Mountains, Elko County, Nevada
- Coordinates: 40°38′54″N 115°21′12″W
- Type: tarn
- Primary outflows: Talbot Creek
- Basin countries: United States
- Surface area: 6 acres (2.4 ha)
- Max. depth: 86 ft (26 m)
- Surface elevation: 10,184 ft (3,104 m)

Verdi Lake is a glacial tarn in the Ruby Mountains of Elko County, Nevada, United States. It is within the Ruby Mountains Wilderness, which is administered by the Ruby Mountains Ranger District of the Humboldt-Toiyabe National Forest. The lake is located at the head of Talbot Canyon at approximately 40°38.9′N 115°21.2′W, and at an elevation of 10,184 feet (3,104 m). Directly to the south rises Verdi Peak. It has an area of approximately 6 acres (2.4 hectares), and a depth of up to 86 feet (26 m).

Verdi Lake is unusual in two respects. It is the highest lake in the Ruby Mountains, and is therefore the last to thaw out in the spring. Also, it does not normally have a surface outlet. Lake water seeps into the soil and emerges as a spring several hundred yards down Talbot Canyon. This is the major source of flow to Talbot Creek, which after exiting the mountains passes near the community of Lamoille, merges with Lamoille Creek, which then meanders down Lamoille Valley and merges with the main branch of the Humboldt River.

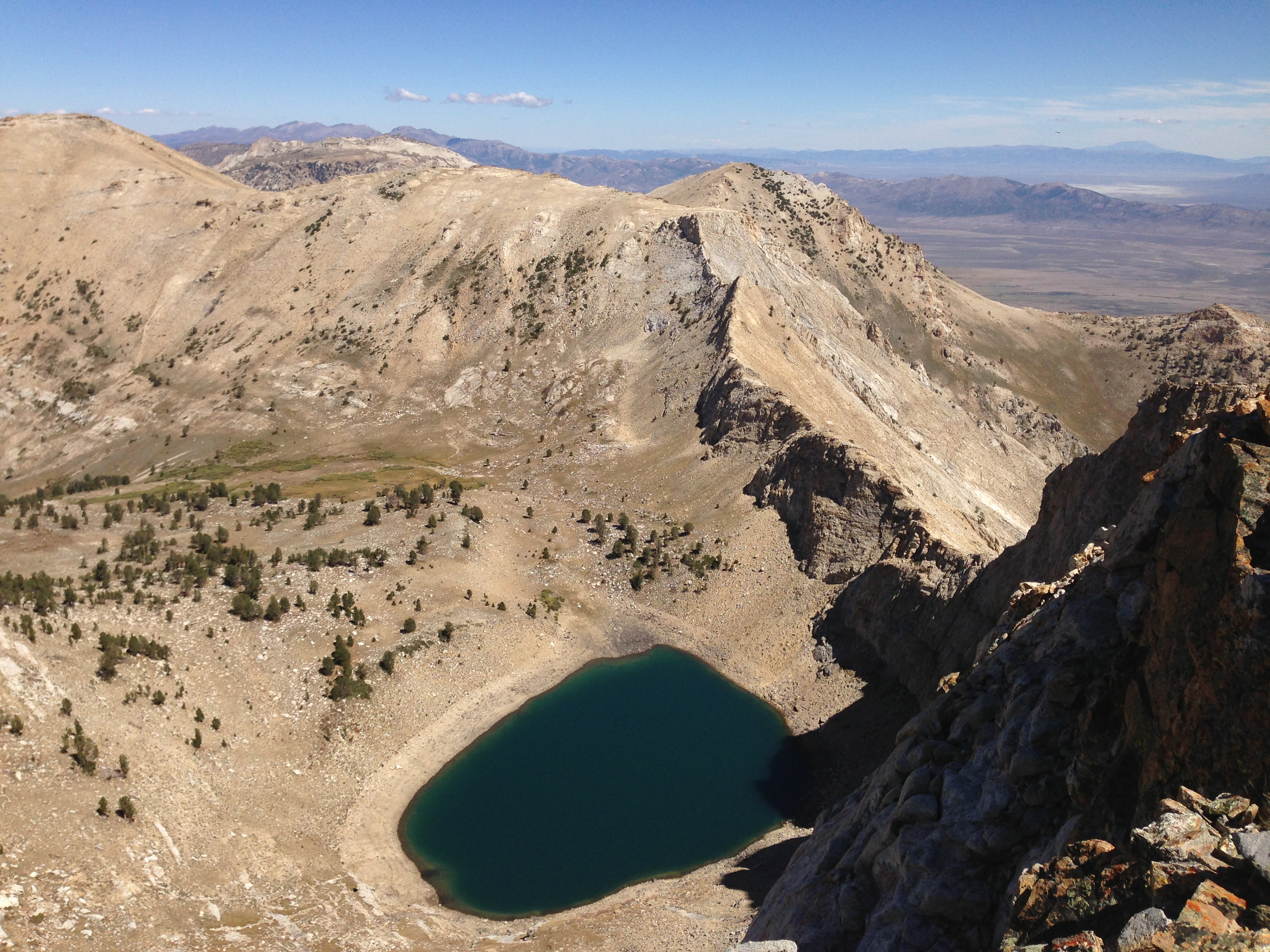
Verdi Lake viewed from Verdi Peaks
