= Dollar Lakes =

Three glacial tarns in Nevada, United States

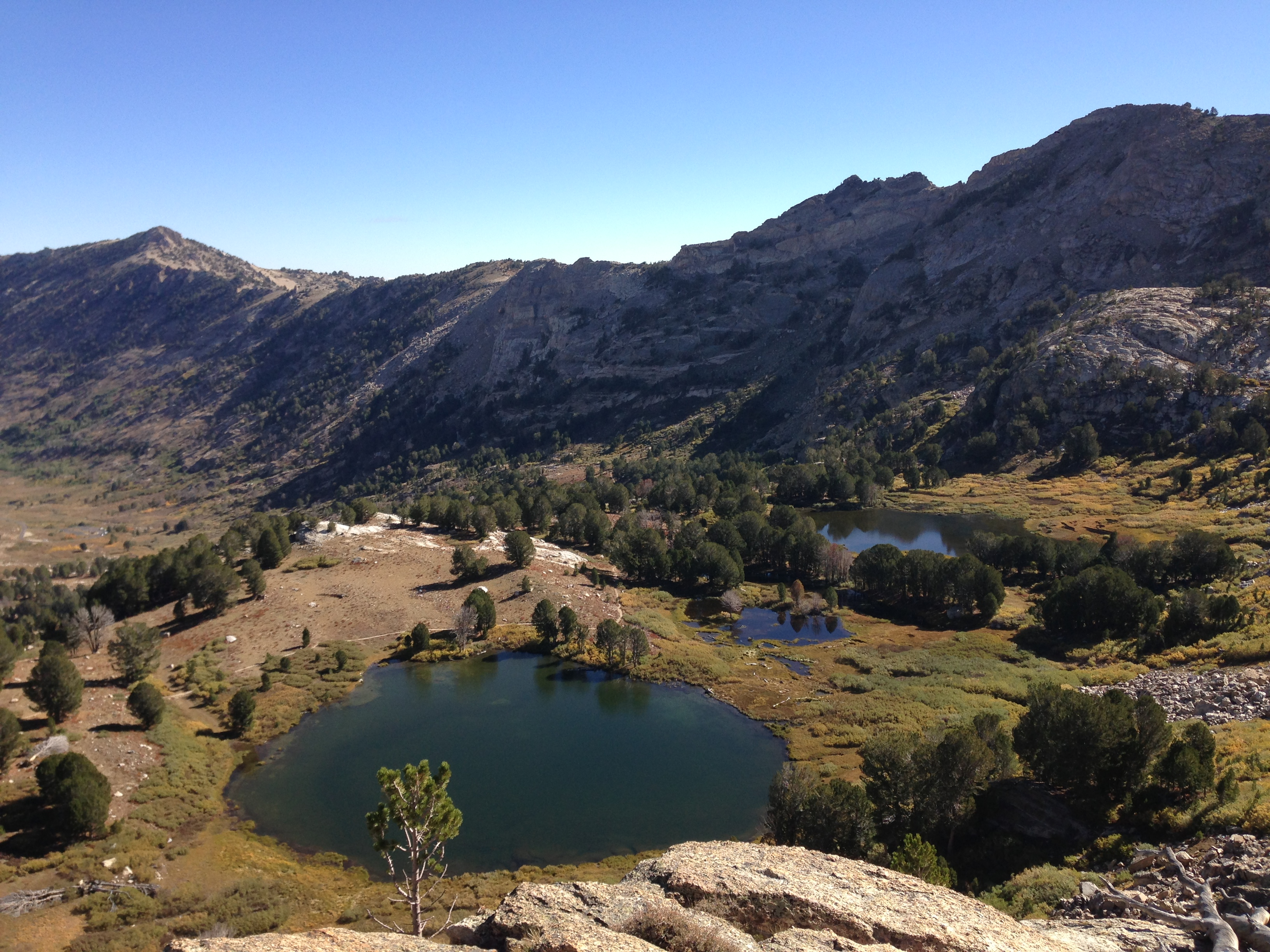

- Location in Nevada
- Location: Ruby Mountains, Elko County, Nevada
- Coordinates: 40°35′30″N 115°23′06″W
- Type: tarn
- Primary outflows: Lamoille Creek
- Basin countries: United States
- Surface area: 3 acres (1.2 ha)
- Max. depth: 15 ft (4.6 m)
- Surface elevation: 9,626 ft (2,934 m)

Dollar Lakes are a group of three glacial tarns in the Ruby Mountains of Elko County, Nevada, United States. They are within the Ruby Mountains Ranger District of the Humboldt-Toiyabe National Forest. The lakes are located near the head of Lamoille Canyon at approximately 40°35′30″N 115°23′6″W, and at an elevation of 9,626 feet (2,934 m). They have a combined area of approximately 3 acres (1.2 hectares), and an estimated depth of up to 15 feet (4.6 m). The Ruby Crest National Recreation Trail runs along the western shore of the lakes.

Dollar and Lamoille lakes are the principal sources of Lamoille Creek, which after exiting the mountains passes through the town of Lamoille, meanders down Lamoille Valley, and then merges with the main branch of the Humboldt River.
