= Liberty Peak =

Mountain in Nevada, United States

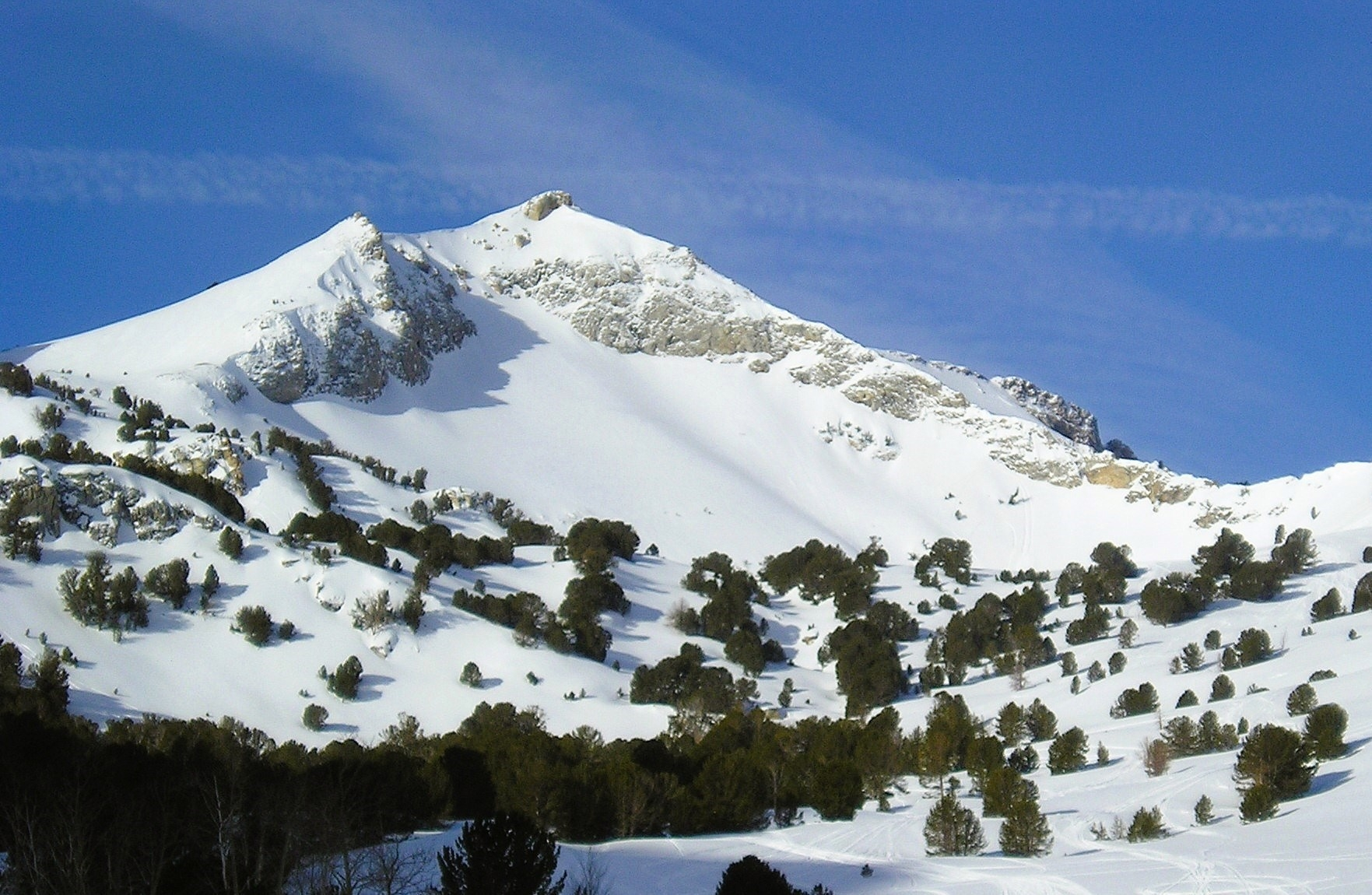
- Liberty Peak, looking south from the Road's End Trailhead

Highest point
- Elevation: 11,037 ft (3,364 m) NAVD 88
- Prominence: 752 ft (229 m)
- Coordinates: 40°35′11″N 115°24′00″W

Geography
- Location within Nevada
- Location: Elko County, Nevada, U.S.
- Parent range: Ruby Mountains
- Topo map: USGS Ruby Dome

Climbing
- Easiest route: From Liberty Pass, Class 2 scramble west along the ridgeline

Liberty Peak is the name given to the officially unnamed mountain peak west of Liberty Pass in the Ruby Mountains of Elko County, Nevada, United States. It is located within the Ruby Mountains Wilderness of the Humboldt-Toiyabe National Forest. The peak rises from the head of Lamoille Canyon, and is a major part of the view at the Road's End Trailhead. To the southeast are Liberty Lake and Kleckner Canyon, while to the northwest is Box Canyon. It is located about 26 miles (42 km) southeast of the community of Elko.

== Summit panorama ==
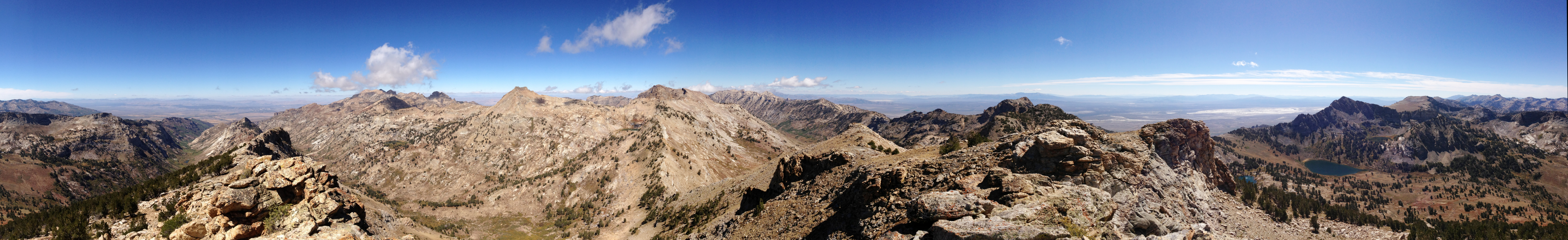
360-degree panorama from the summit of Liberty Peak
