= Liberty Lake =

Liberty Lake may refer to:

- Liberty Lake (Ontario)
- Liberty Lake (Nevada)
- Liberty Lake (Washington)
  - Liberty Lake, Washington, a city located on the lake.

== See also ==
- Liberty Lake, Virginia
