= Castle Lake =

Castle Lake may refer to:

- Castle Lake (California), a glacially-formed cirque lake in Siskiyou County
- Castle Lake (Idaho), an alpine lake in Custer County
- Castle Lake (Nevada), a glacial tarn in Elko County
- Castle Lake (Washington), a barrier lake formed by the 1980 eruption of Mount St. Helens
- Castle Lake (Park County, Montana), a lake in Park County
- Castle Lake (Meagher County, Montana), a lake in Meagher County
- Castle Lake, a reservoir in Henry County, Indiana
- Castle Lake, a lake in Bishop Middleham, County Durham, England
- Castillo del Lago, an estate in Los Angeles, California
