= Island Lake (Nevada) =

Lake in Nevada, United States

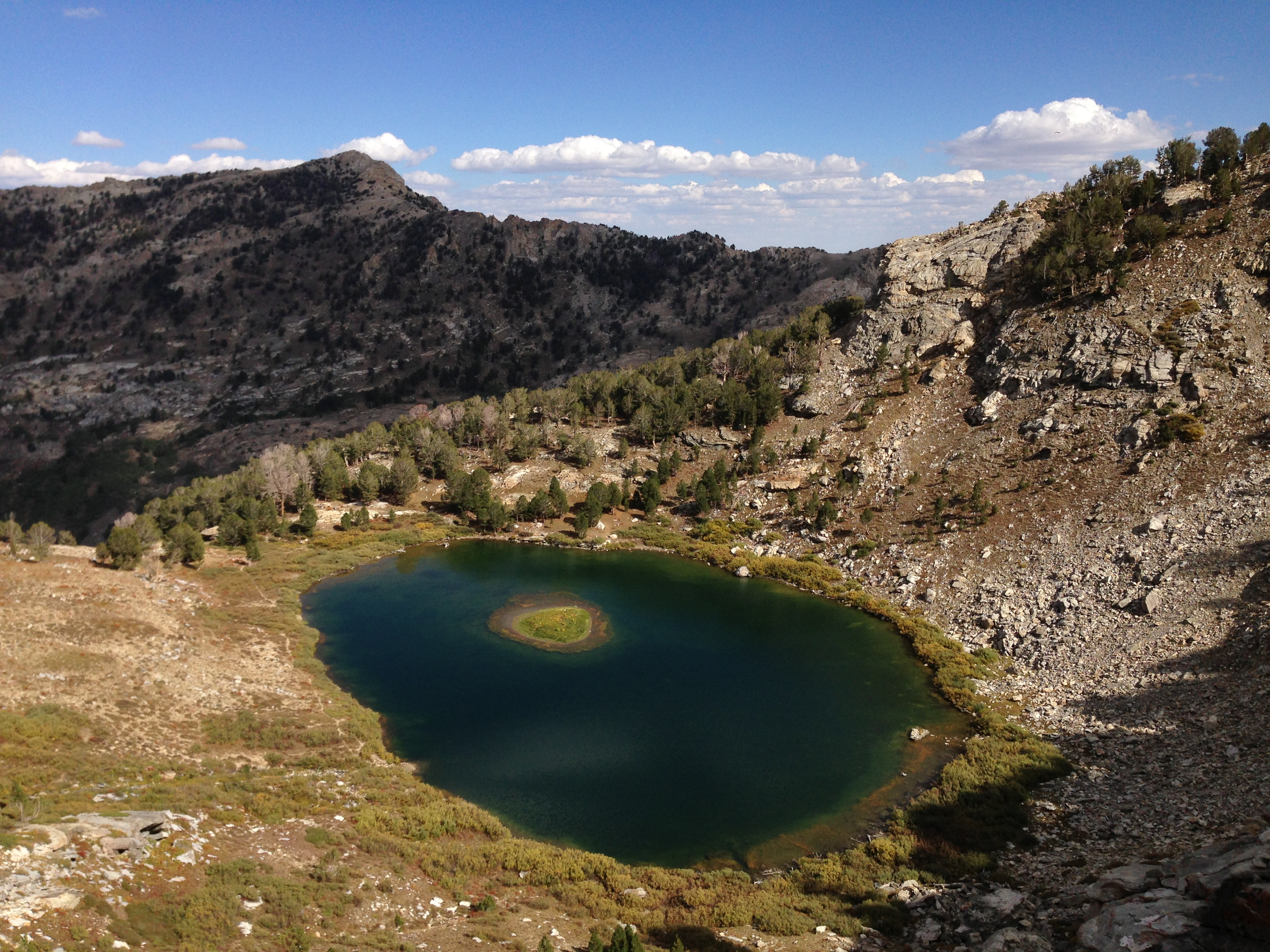

- Location in Nevada
- Location: Ruby Mountains, Elko County, Nevada
- Coordinates: 40°36′54″N 115°22′53″W
- Type: tarn
- Basin countries: United States
- Surface area: 7.5 acres (3.0 ha)
- Max. depth: 22 ft (6.7 m)
- Surface elevation: 9,665 ft (2,946 m)
- Islands: 1

Island Lake is a glacial tarn in the Ruby Mountains of Elko County, Nevada, United States. It is within the Ruby Mountains Ranger District of the Humboldt-Toiyabe National Forest. The lake is a hanging valley at the end of a 2-mile (3.2 km) trail that begins at a parking lot at the end of Lamoille Canyon Road. The lake surface is 9,665 feet (2,946 m) above sea level, about 910 feet (280 m) above the parking lot.

Island Lake has an area of approximately 7.5 acres (3.0 ha) and a depth of up to 22 feet (6.7 m). It is a popular site for day trips, fishing, and camping.

Island Lake is a minor source of flow for Lamoille Creek, which after exiting the mountains passes through the town of Lamoille, meanders down Lamoille Valley, and then merges with the main branch of the Humboldt River.

== See also ==
- List of lakes in Nevada
