= Castle Lake (Nevada) =

Lake in Elko County, Nevada, United States

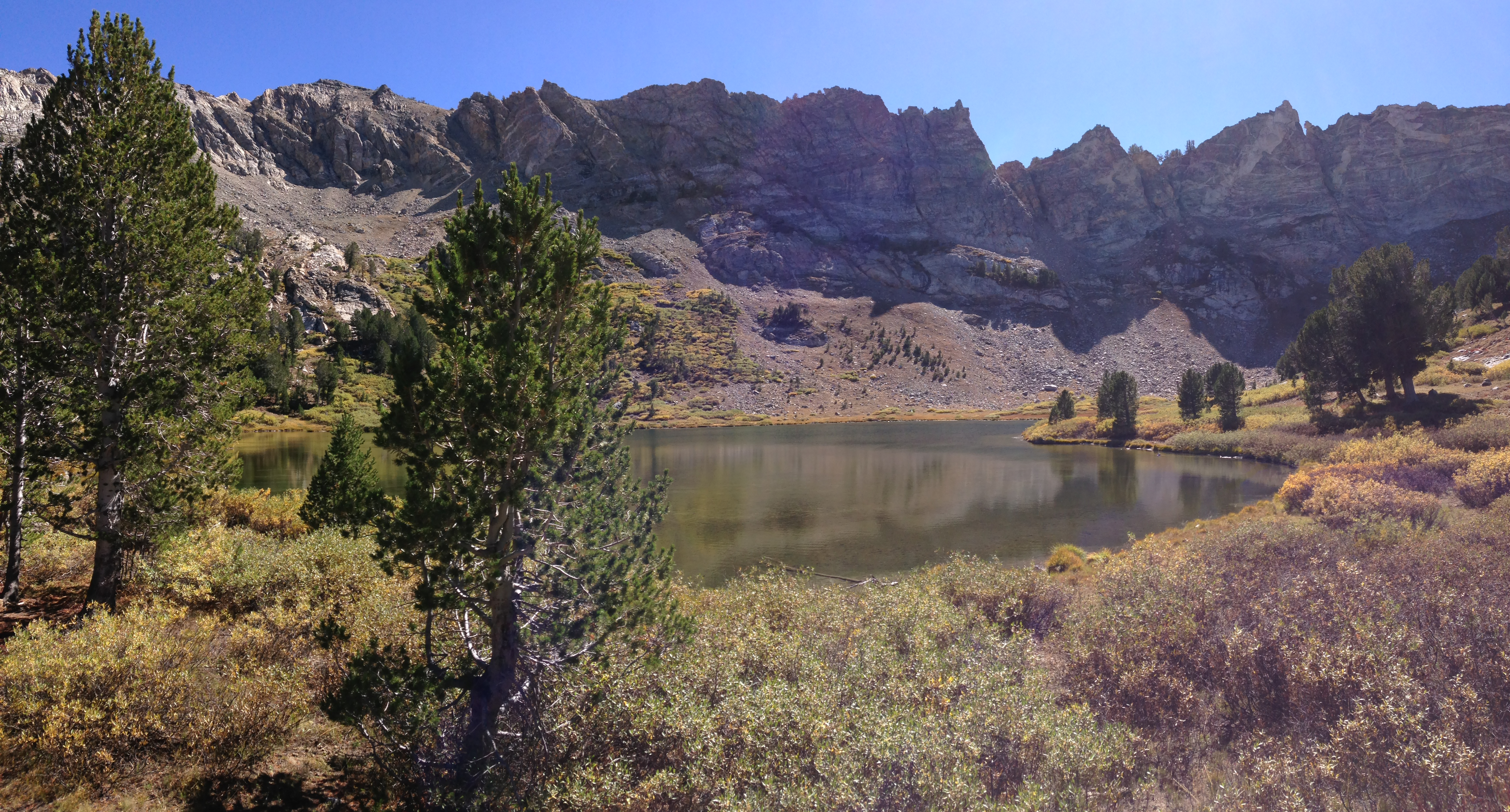
- Castle Lake and cliffs of Lake Peak

- Location in Nevada
- Location: Elko County, Nevada, United States
- Coordinates: 40°34′06″N 115°23′54″W
- Type: tarn
- Basin countries: United States
- Surface area: 14 acres (5.7 ha)
- Max. depth: 15 ft (4.6 m)
- Surface elevation: 9,793 ft (2,985 m)

Castle Lake is a glacial tarn in the Ruby Mountains of Elko County, Nevada, United States. It is within the Ruby Mountains Wilderness, which is administered by the Ruby Mountains Ranger District of the Humboldt-Toiyabe National Forest. The lake is located on a shelf near the head of Kleckner Canyon, at approximately 40°34.1′N 115°23.9′W, and at an elevation of 9,793 feet (2985 m) immediately below Lake Peak. It has an area of approximately 14 acres (57,000 m^{2}), and a depth of up to 15 feet (4.6 m). It is one of the sources of Kleckner Creek, which after exiting the mountains merges with other streams to form the South Fork of the Humboldt River.
