= Lamoille Lake =

Lake in Elko County, Nevada, United States

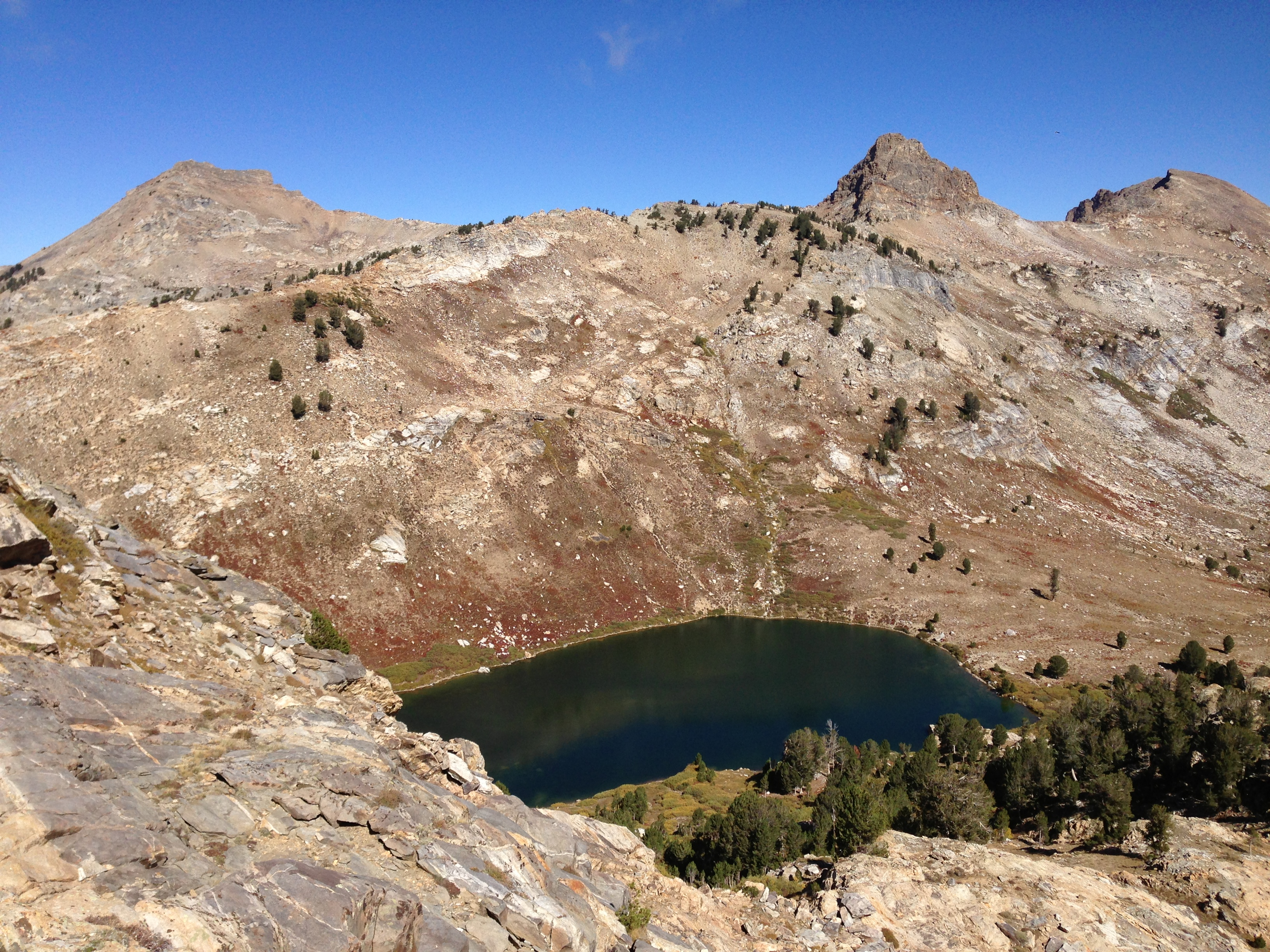

- Location in Nevada
- Location: Elko County, Nevada, United States
- Coordinates: 40°35′33″N 115°23′38″W
- Type: tarn
- Primary outflows: Lamoille Creek
- Basin countries: United States
- Surface area: 13.6 acres (5.5 ha)
- Surface elevation: 9,747 ft (2,971 m)

Lamoille Lake is a glacial tarn in the Ruby Mountains of Elko County, Nevada, United States. It is within the Ruby Mountains Ranger District of the Humboldt-Toiyabe National Forest. The lake is located at the head of Lamoille Canyon, at approximately 40°34.6′N 115°23.7′W, and at an elevation of 9,747 feet (2,971 meters). It has an area of approximately 13.6 acres (5.5 hectares). It is a popular destination for day hikers and fishing, as the Ruby Crest National Recreation Trail passes its eastern shore before beginning a steep climb to Liberty Pass.

Lamoille Lake and the Dollar Lakes are the principal sources of Lamoille Creek, which after exiting the mountains passes through the town of Lamoille, meanders down Lamoille Valley, and then merges with the main branch of the Humboldt River.
