= Verdi Peak (Nevada) =

Three mountain peaks in Nevada, U.S.

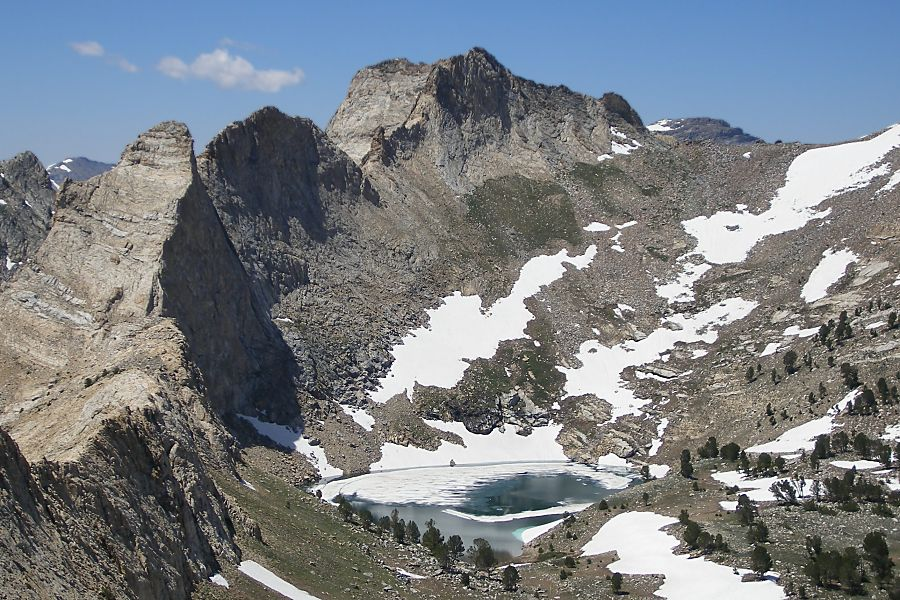
- The central summit of Verdi Peaks, looking south across Verdi Lake

Highest point
- Elevation: 11,074 ft (3,375 m) NGVD 29
- Prominence: 1,218 ft (371 m)
- Coordinates: 40°38′40″N 115°21′28″W

Geography
- Location within Nevada
- Location: Elko County, Nevada, U.S.
- Parent range: Ruby Mountains
- Topo map: USGS Verdi Peak

Climbing
- Easiest route: From high saddle between peaks: Hike and Scramble

The Verdi Peaks, officially just Verdi Peak, are a group of three mountain peaks in the Ruby Mountains of Elko County, Nevada, United States. The highest peak is the fiftieth-highest in the state. The peaks are located on the edge of the Ruby Mountains Wilderness, within the Ruby Mountains Ranger District of the Humboldt-Toiyabe National Forest. They rise from the head of Talbot Canyon above Verdi Lake, and are a prominent part of the east wall of Lamoille Canyon above the Terraces Picnic Area. The two southern summits are directly on the Ruby Crest 5,000 feet (1,500 m) above the Ruby Valley to the east. The central summit is the highest of the three and is located about 25 miles (40 km) southeast of the city of Elko.

== Summit panoramas ==
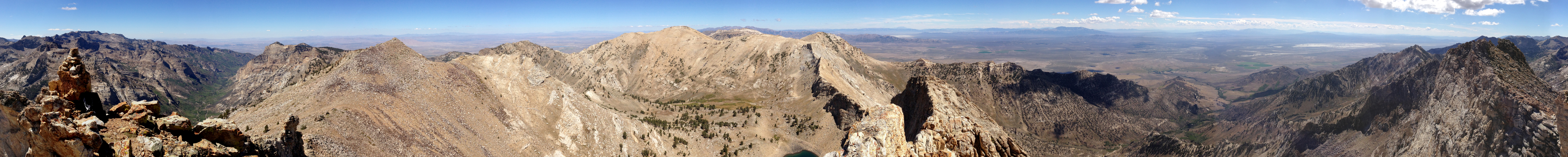
View from the central Verdi Peak
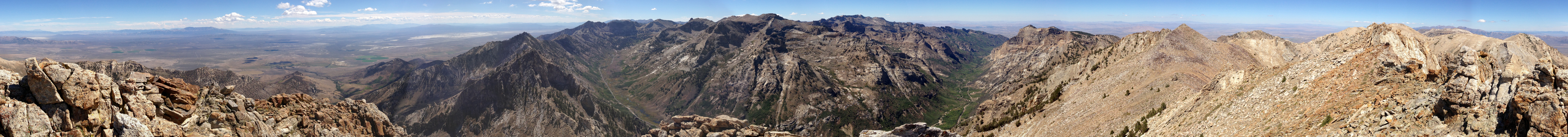
View from the southern Verdi Peak
