= Lamoille Canyon Road =

Scenic road in Nevada, United States

Lamoille Canyon Road
- Forest Route 660; Lamoille Canyon Scenic Byway
- Lamoille Canyon Road highlighted in red

Route information
- Maintained by USFS
- Length: 12.1 mi (19.5 km)

Major junctions
- South end: Ruby Crest National Recreation Trail in Lamoille Canyon
- North end: SR 227 in Lamoille

Location
- Country: United States

Highway system
- Scenic Byways; National; National Forest; BLM; NPS

Lamoille Canyon Road, also known as Lamoille Canyon Scenic Byway, is a 12-mile-long (19 km) National Forest Scenic Byway in Elko County, Nevada, in the western United States. The road traverses Lamoille Canyon in the Ruby Mountains of northeastern Nevada, and it is administered by the Ruby Mountains Ranger District of the Humboldt–Toiyabe National Forest.

== Route description ==
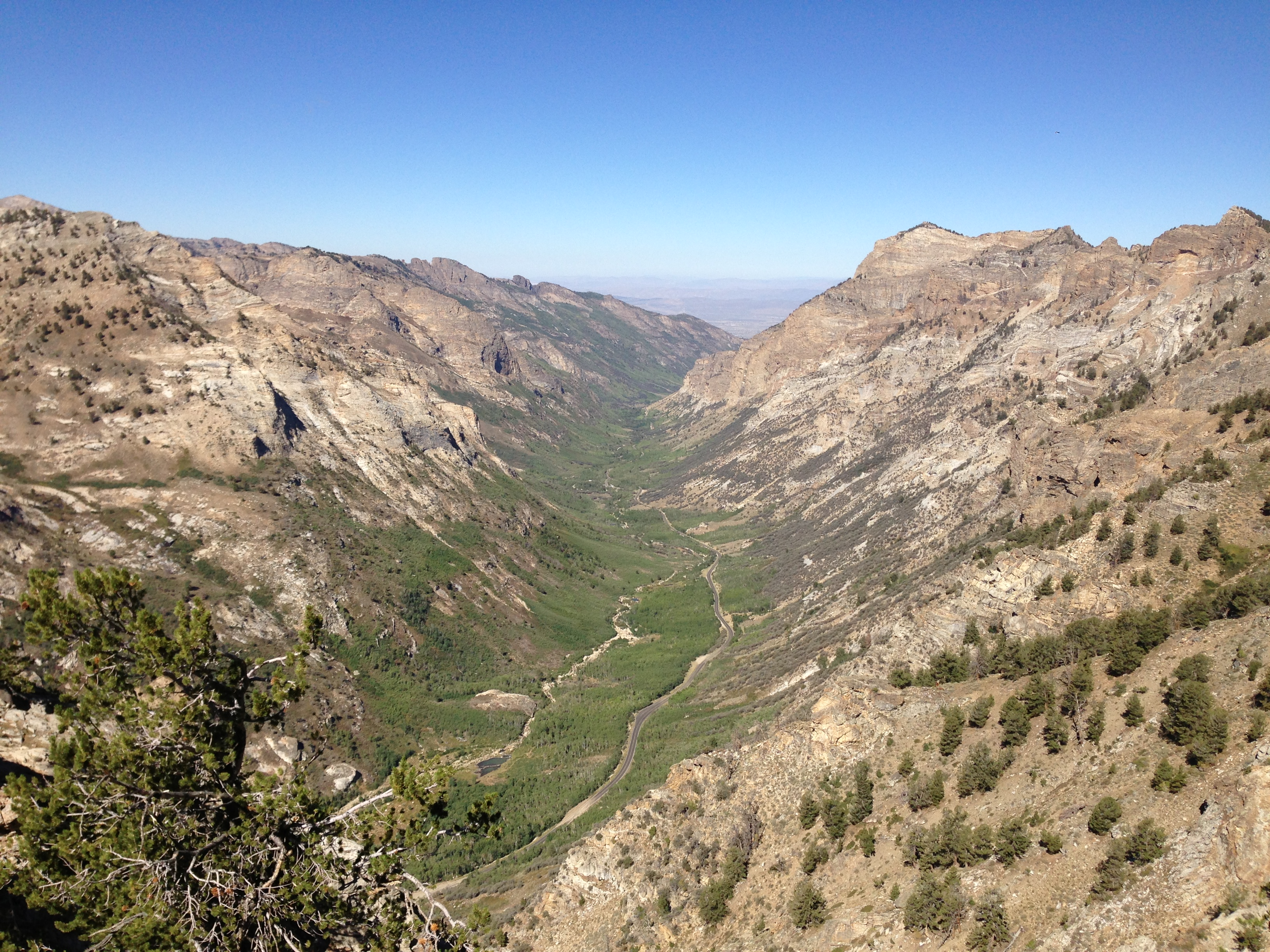
Lamoille Canyon Road winds its way through Lamoille Canyon

Lamoille Canyon Road is officially designated National Forest Road 660 (NF 660). Its southern terminus is at a large parking area in Lamoille Canyon with multiple trailheads. From here, the road winds north and then northwest through the canyon, descending from its elevation of 8,800 feet (2,700 m) at the parking area to around 6,000 feet (1,800 m) at the entrance of the canyon. Once outside of the canyon, the road continues north toward the small town of Lamoille, reaching its northern terminus west of town at an intersection with SR 227. The eastern terminus of SR 227 is located about one mile east of this location.

Throughout its length, the road is undivided and two-lanes wide (one each way) with a speed limit of 35 mph (56 km/h). The road is not plowed in the winter, when it is used for winter recreation such as cross-country skiing and snowmobiling. Motor vehicle access to the upper end of the road is generally limited to the months of June through October, though this is partly dependent on snowfall. In contrast, the section of the road below 7,000 feet (2,100 m) is usually motor-vehicle accessible for most of the year.

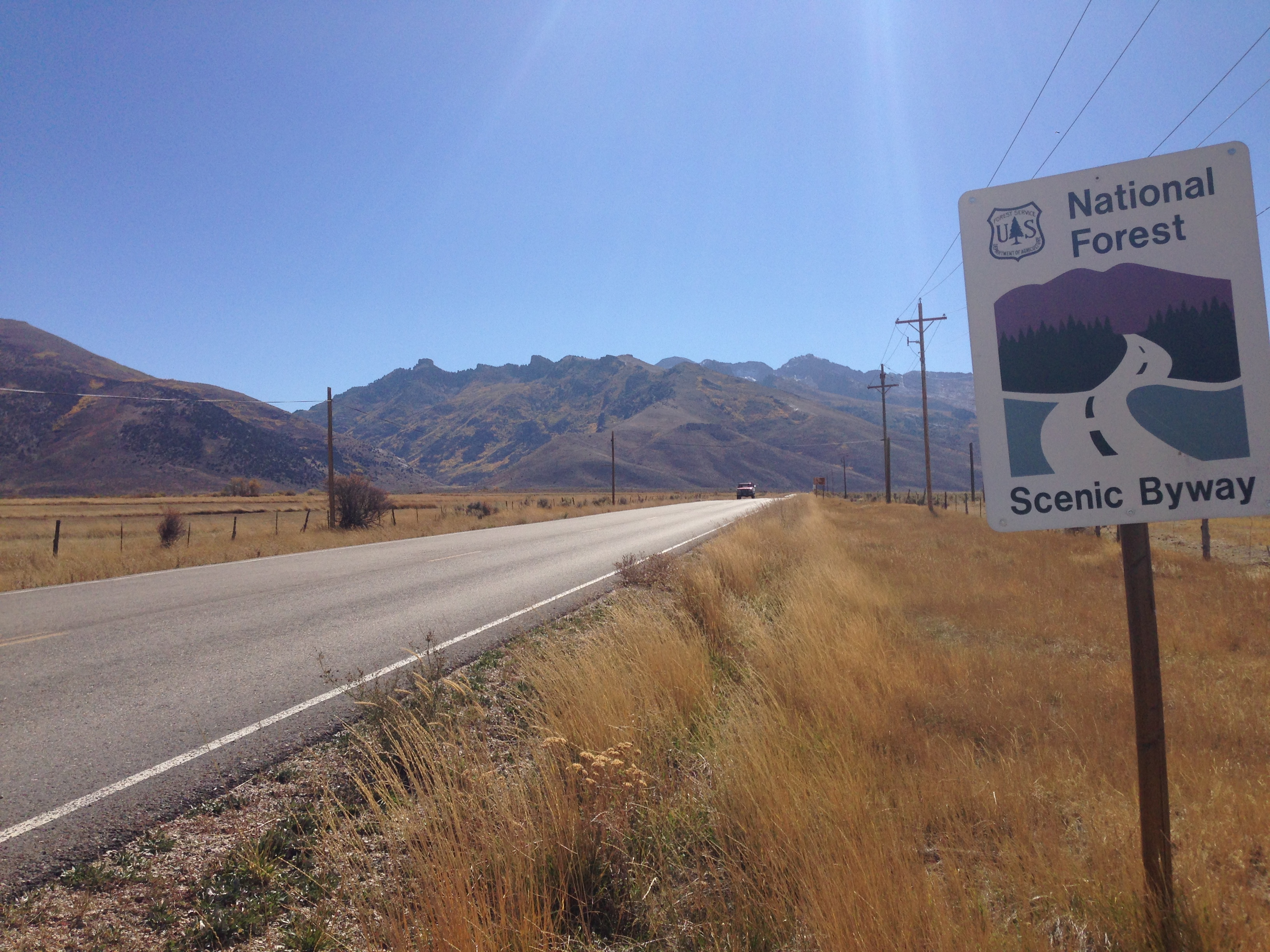
National Forest Scenic Byway sign at the north end of Lamoille Canyon Road

=== Points of interest ===
Powerhouse Picnic Area, Camp Lamoille, Thomas Canyon Campground, Changing Canyon Nature Trail, Terraces Picnic Area, and Roads End Trailhead are all located along Lamoille Canyon Road. The Roads End Trailhead is the northern terminus of the Ruby Crest National Recreation Trail.

== History ==
Lamoille Canyon Road was constructed by the Civilian Conservation Corps in the 1930s and 1940s.

== Major intersections ==
The entire route is in Elko County.

Location	mi	km	Destinations	Notes
Humboldt–Toiyabe National Forest	0.00	0.00	Lamoille Canyon Trailhead	Southern terminus
Lamoille	12.1	19.5	SR 227 west (Lamoille Highway)	Northern terminus
1.000 mi = 1.609 km; 1.000 km = 0.621 mi
