= Favre Lake =

Lake in Elko County, Nevada, United States

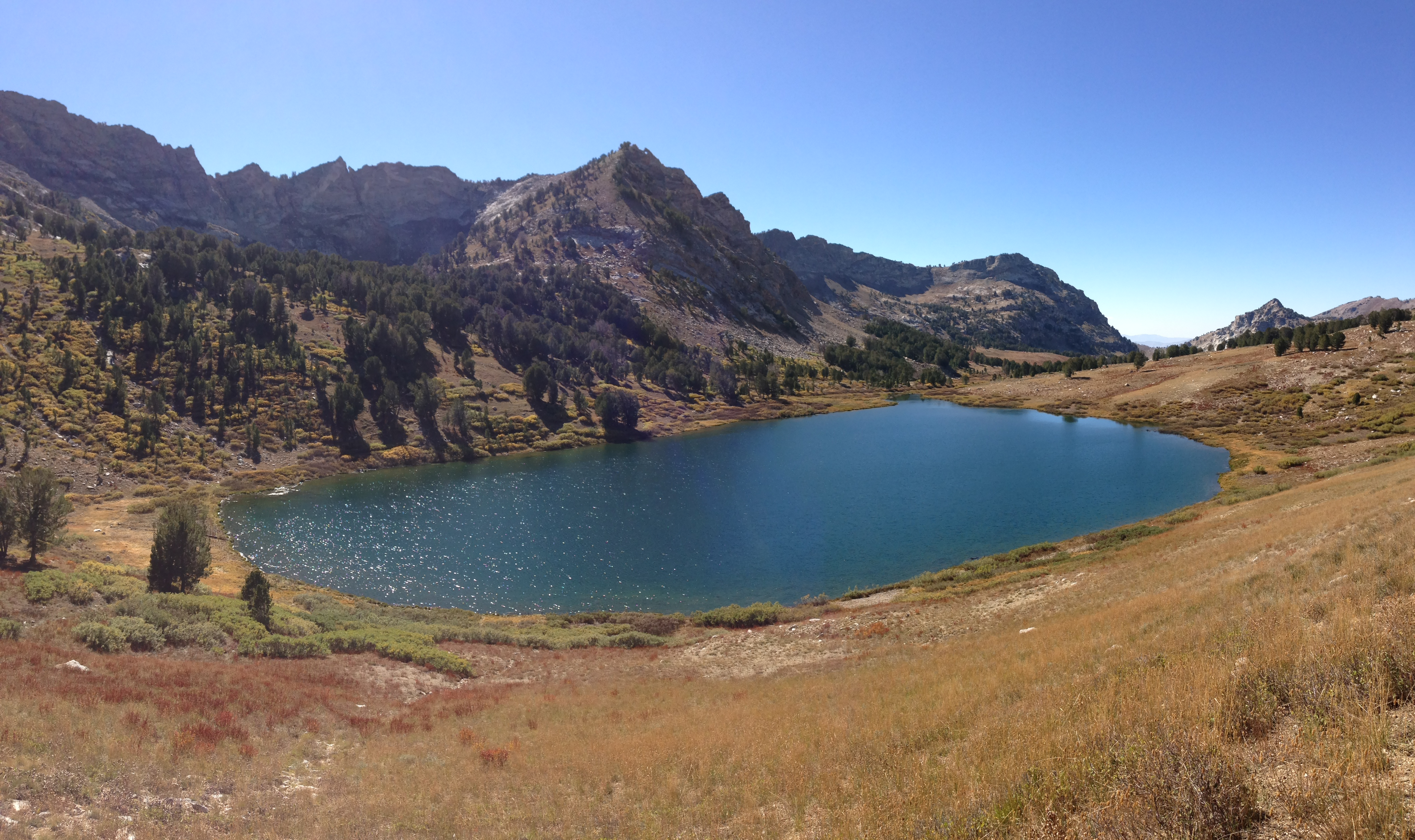

- Location in Nevada Favre Lake (the United States)
- Location: Elko County, Nevada
- Coordinates: 40°34′22.8″N 115°23′49.2″W
- Type: tarn
- Primary outflows: Kleckner Creek
- Basin countries: United States
- Surface area: 19 acres (7.7 ha)
- Max. depth: 45 ft (14 m)
- Surface elevation: 9,511 ft (2,899 m)

Favre Lake is a glacial tarn in the Ruby Mountains of Elko County, Nevada, United States. It is within the Ruby Mountains Wilderness, which is administered by the Ruby Mountains Ranger District of the Humboldt-Toiyabe National Forest. The lake is located at the head of Kleckner Canyon, at approximately 40°34.4′N 115°23.8′W, and at an elevation of 9,511 feet (2,899 m). It has an area of approximately 19 acres (7.7 hectares), and a depth of up to 45 feet (14 m). It is one of the sources of Kleckner Creek, which after exiting the mountains merges with other streams to form the South Fork of the Humboldt River.
