= Liberty Lake (Nevada) =

Lake in Nevada, United States

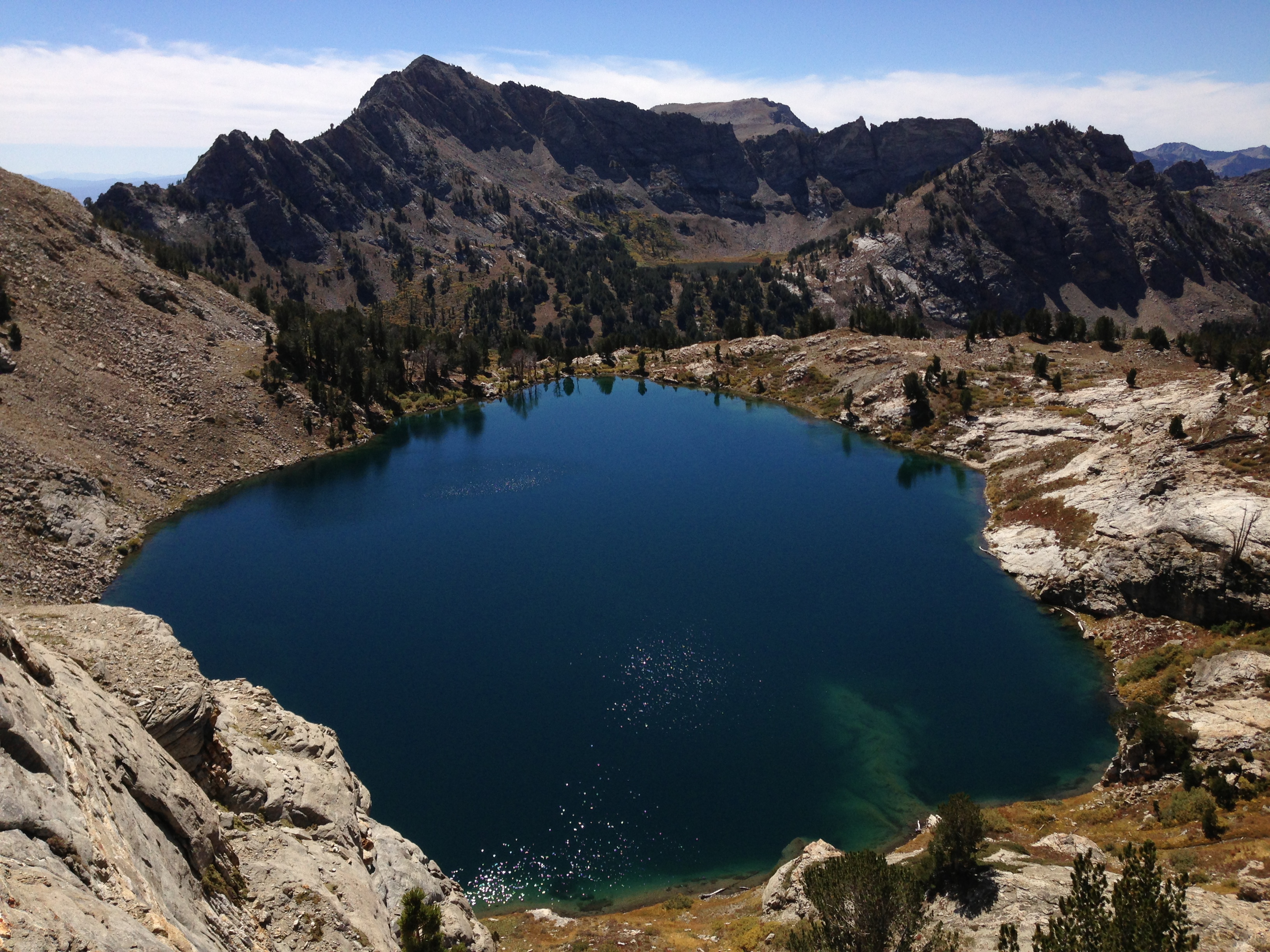
- Liberty Lake and Lake Peak

- Location of Liberty Lake in Nevada
- Location: Elko County, Nevada
- Coordinates: 40°34′48″N 115°23′42″W
- Type: tarn
- Primary outflows: Kleckner Creek
- Basin countries: United States
- Surface area: 21 acres (8.5 ha)
- Max. depth: 108 ft (33 m)
- Surface elevation: 10,039 ft (3,060 m)

Liberty Lake is a glacial tarn in the Ruby Mountains of Elko County, Nevada, United States. It is within the Ruby Mountains Wilderness, which is administered by the Ruby Mountains Ranger District of the Humboldt-Toiyabe National Forest. The lake is located near the head of Kleckner Canyon at approximately 40°34.8′N 115°23.7′W, and at an elevation of 10,039 feet (3,060 meters). It has an area of approximately 21 acres (8.5 hectares), and a depth of up to 108 feet (33 meters). It is one of the sources of Kleckner Creek, which after exiting the mountains merges with other streams to form the South Fork of the Humboldt River. The Ruby Crest National Recreation Trail runs along the western shore of the lake.
