= Lamoille Organization Camp =

- Formerly listed on the U.S. National Register of Historic Places
- U.S. Historic district
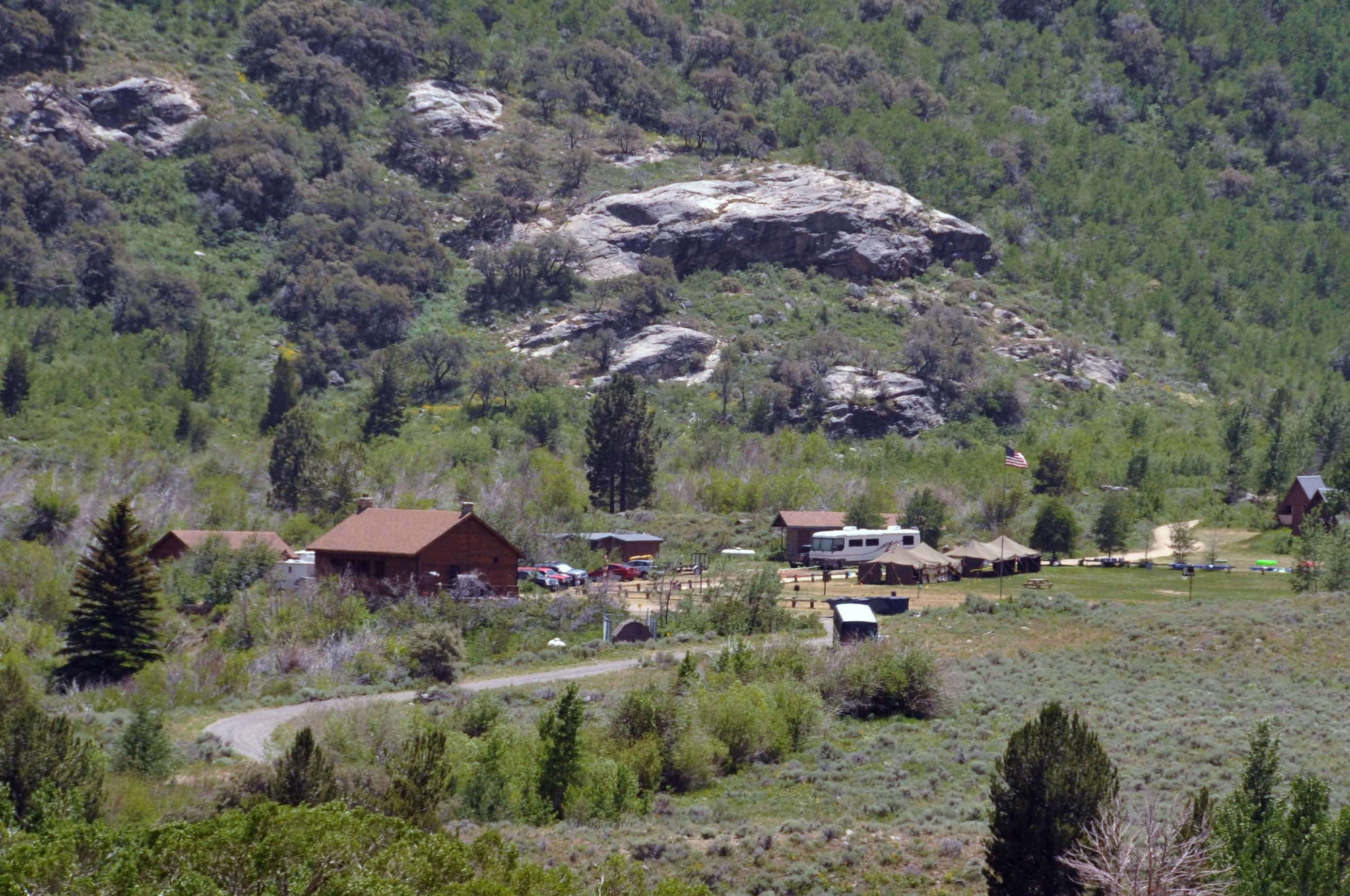
- Nearest city: Lamoille, Nevada
- Area: 19 acres (7.7 ha)
- Built: 1939
- Architect: Jefferson, H.J.; et al.
- Architectural style: Region 4 Forest Service 1930
- NRHP reference No.: 07000553

Significant dates
- Added to NRHP: June 14, 2007
- Removed from NRHP: February 25, 2021

The Lamoille Organization Camp, also known as Camp Lamoille and Elko Lion's Club Camp Lamoille, is a camping facility within the Ruby Mountains Ranger District of the Humboldt-Toiyabe National Forest. It was originally constructed in 1939. It is located in Lamoille Canyon, the largest valley of the Ruby Mountains, in Elko County, Nevada. It was a work of the Region 4 of the U.S. Forest Service. It was listed as a historic district on the National Register of Historic Places in 2007, and was delisted in 2021. The listing included two contributing buildings on 19 acres (7.7 ha).

Formerly used as a Boy Scout camp, the facility is currently managed by the Elko Lions Club and is available for rental.
