= Lamoille Canyon =

Valley in Nevada, United States

Coordinates: 40°41′30″N 115°28′27″W

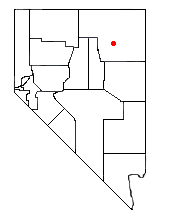
Location of Lamoille Canyon within Nevada

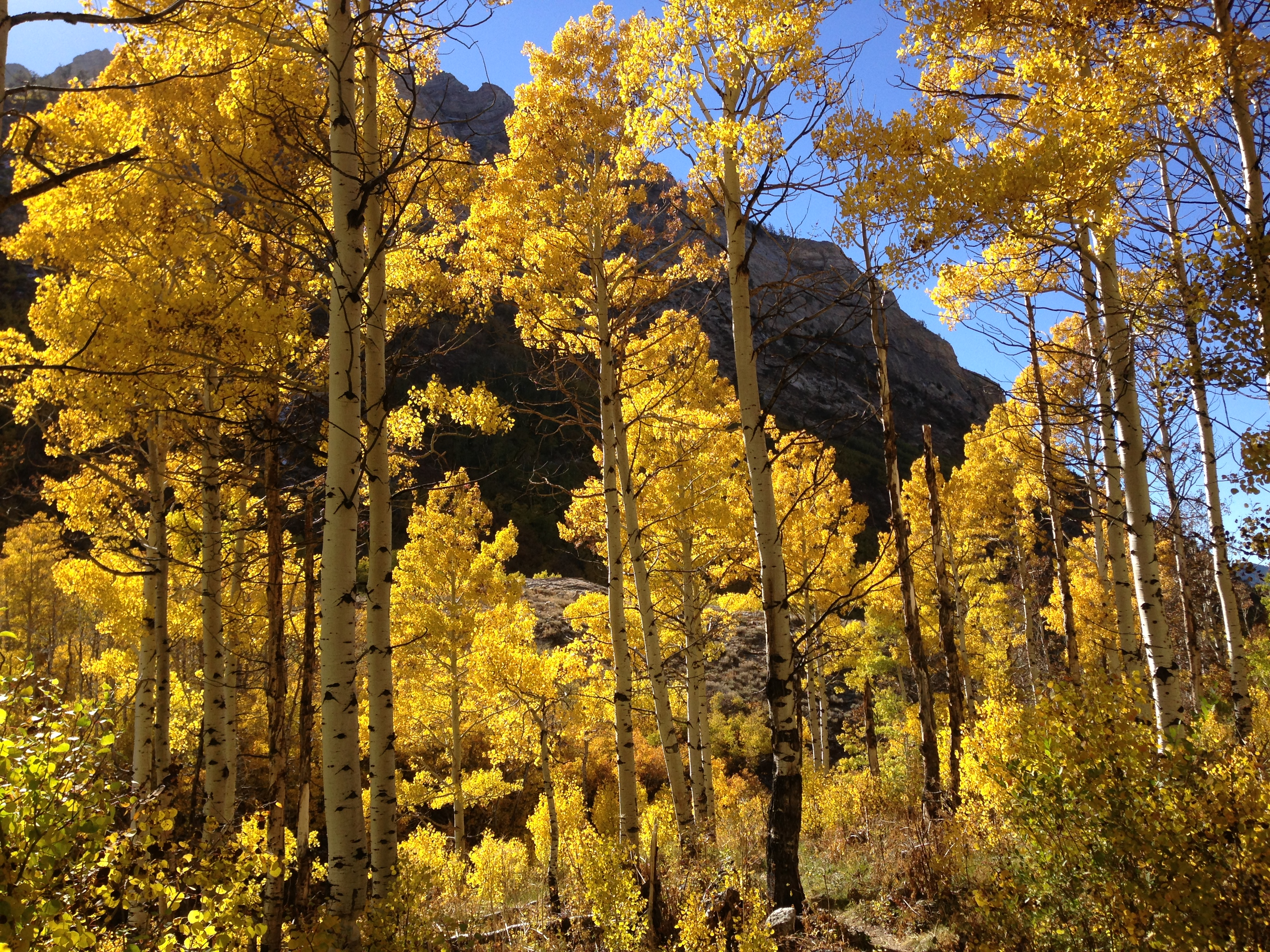
Aspens changing to gold along a nature trail

Lamoille Canyon is the largest valley in the Ruby Mountains, located in the central portion of Elko County in the northeastern section of the state of Nevada, in the western United States. Approximately 12 miles (19 km) in length, it was extensively sculpted by glaciers in previous ice ages.

Lamoille Canyon begins at Liberty Peak at an elevation of 11,032 ft (3,363 m). It quickly descends to a glacial basin now occupied by Lamoille Lake. A nearby granite shelf contains the Dollar Lakes. Further down the canyon is a large stand of Whitebark pine and the Road's End Trailhead, the high point (8,800 ft (2,700 m)) of Lamoille Canyon Road, which is a National Forest Scenic Byway. This is also the northern terminus of the 38-mile (61 km) Ruby Crest National Recreation Trail, and the start of the much shorter trail to Island Lake.

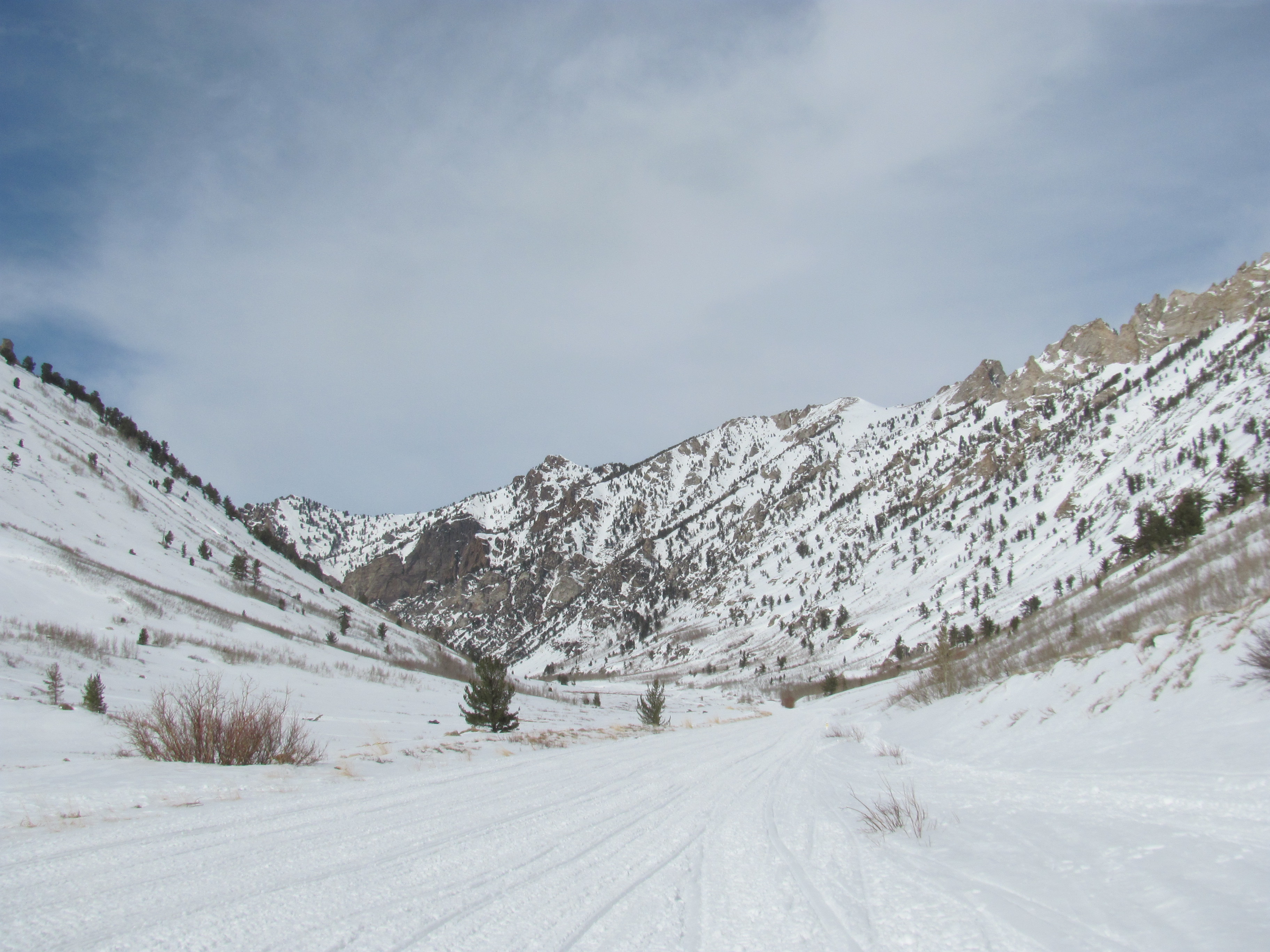
A Snowy Lamoille Canyon

Road's End is where Lamoille Canyon begins a sweeping turn around the flanks of Thomas Peak, 11,325 ft (3,452 m). The glaciers have deeply carved the canyon, leaving a U-shaped cross section and, high on the side of Thomas Peak, four hanging valleys (including Island Lake). The road then passes the Terraces Picnic Area (featuring more glacial remnants) and Verdi Peak. A nearby nature trail exhibits the diverse plant life in the canyon bottom.

The canyon continues to descend to its junction with Thomas Canyon, which enters from the south. At the head of Thomas Canyon is Mount Fitzgerald (11,215 ft (3,418 m)), and at its outlet is the Thomas Canyon Campground. About a mile below the campground, Lamoille Canyon passes through a narrow slot and then drops quickly to its junction with Right Fork Canyon, which also enters from the south. Near this point are Lamoille Falls, Camp Lamoille (available for group rental), and the north face of Mount Gilbert (11,120 ft (3,390 m)). At Camp Lamoille the canyon has descended to 7,100 ft (2,200 m). In the remaining 3 miles it descends another 1,000 ft (300 m) and exits the range at the Powerhouse Picnic Area, the site of a powerhouse built in 1913 for the Elko-Lamoille Power Company. It burned down in 1971, leaving only the foundation. Nearby are the communities of Lamoille and Spring Creek.

== Panorama ==
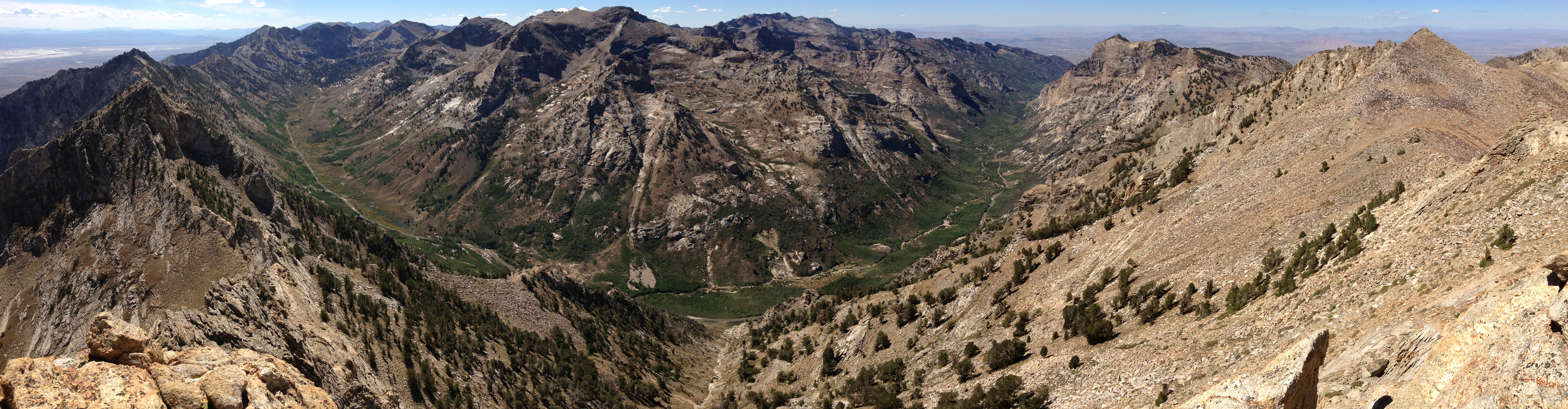
Panorama of Lamoille Canyon and Thomas Peak, viewed from atop Verdi Peak
