= Lamoille, Nevada =

- Census-designated place
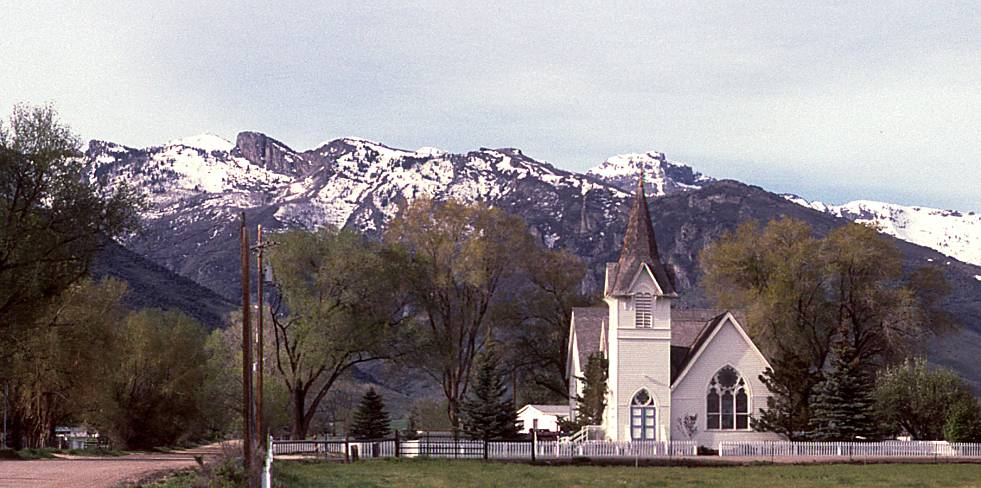
- Lamoille Presbyterian Church with the Ruby Mountains in the background

- Location within the state of Nevada
- Coordinates: 40°43′26″N 115°28′44″W
- Country: United States
- State: Nevada
- County: Elko

Area
  - Total: 1.85 sq mi (4.78 km^{2})
  - Land: 1.85 sq mi (4.78 km^{2})
  - Water: 0 sq mi (0.00 km^{2})
- Elevation: 5,925 ft (1,806 m)

Population (2020)
  - Total: 130
  - Density: 70/sq mi (27/km^{2})
- Time zone: UTC-8 (Pacific (PST))
  - Summer (DST): UTC-7 (PDT)
- ZIP code: 89828
- FIPS code: 32-39300
- GNIS feature ID: 2583938

Lamoille is a rural census-designated place in Elko County in the northeastern section of the state of Nevada in the western United States. As of the 2020 census, Lamoille had a population of 130. It is located 19 miles (31 km) southeast of Elko at the base of the Ruby Mountains and is part of the Elko Micropolitan Statistical Area.

== History ==
The early history of the community and surrounding area is summarized in a nearby highway marker:

LAMOILLE VALLEY - Because heavy use denuded the grass from the main Fort Hall route of the California Emigrant Trail along the Humboldt River, many emigrants left the river near Starr Valley. They skirted the East Humboldt Range and the Ruby Mountains along a Shoshone Indian path, rested their livestock in Lamoille Valley, and returned to the Humboldt River.

John Walker and Thomas Waterman first settled the area in 1865. Waterman named the valley after his native Vermont. In 1868, Walker erected the Cottonwood Hotel, store and blacksmith shop in the valley, and the settlement became known as "The Crossroads." Here wagons were repaired and food and supplies could be obtained. The original buildings and the more recent 20-bedroom Lamoille hotel, creamery, flour mill and dance hall are gone.

Lamoille is located on the western flanks of the Ruby Mountains at the end of Nevada State Route 227, and is the principal gateway to this range via the National Forest Scenic Byway up Lamoille Canyon. In 1907 a small church was constructed on the east side of the community, and is still in use today.

Former Disney president and good friend of Clint Eastwood, Frank Wells, died in a helicopter crash here in the Nevada Ruby Mountains.

== Demographics ==
Historical population
Census	Pop.	Note	%±
2020	130		—

== Climate ==
Climate data for Lamoille 2N, Nevada, 1991–2020 normals: 5,750 ft (1,750 m)
Month	Jan	Feb	Mar	Apr	May	Jun	Jul	Aug	Sep	Oct	Nov	Dec	Year
Record high °F (°C)	59 (15)	64 (18)	76 (24)	81 (27)	88 (31)	93 (34)	95 (35)	96 (36)	93 (34)	85 (29)	70 (21)	62 (17)	96 (36)
Mean maximum °F (°C)	48 (9)	53 (12)	64 (18)	73 (23)	79 (26)	87 (31)	92 (33)	90 (32)	86 (30)	77 (25)	65 (18)	54 (12)	92 (33)
Mean daily maximum °F (°C)	35.3 (1.8)	39.4 (4.1)	47.8 (8.8)	54.5 (12.5)	63.3 (17.4)	73.9 (23.3)	83.8 (28.8)	83.0 (28.3)	74.3 (23.5)	62.0 (16.7)	46.8 (8.2)	36.7 (2.6)	58.4 (14.7)
Daily mean °F (°C)	22.7 (−5.2)	25.4 (−3.7)	33.6 (0.9)	39.5 (4.2)	47.9 (8.8)	56.3 (13.5)	63.7 (17.6)	61.7 (16.5)	53.4 (11.9)	42.6 (5.9)	31.4 (−0.3)	23.6 (−4.7)	41.8 (5.5)
Mean daily minimum °F (°C)	10.0 (−12.2)	11.4 (−11.4)	19.4 (−7.0)	24.6 (−4.1)	32.6 (0.3)	38.7 (3.7)	43.6 (6.4)	40.5 (4.7)	32.5 (0.3)	23.2 (−4.9)	15.9 (−8.9)	10.4 (−12.0)	25.2 (−3.8)
Mean minimum °F (°C)	−12 (−24)	−10 (−23)	2 (−17)	10 (−12)	20 (−7)	29 (−2)	36 (2)	30 (−1)	19 (−7)	9 (−13)	−3 (−19)	−11 (−24)	−19 (−28)
Record low °F (°C)	−30 (−34)	−20 (−29)	−18 (−28)	−3 (−19)	10 (−12)	23 (−5)	29 (−2)	24 (−4)	13 (−11)	−6 (−21)	−22 (−30)	−24 (−31)	−30 (−34)
Average precipitation inches (mm)	1.36 (35)	1.30 (33)	1.85 (47)	2.29 (58)	1.97 (50)	1.01 (26)	0.30 (7.6)	0.48 (12)	0.87 (22)	1.14 (29)	1.12 (28)	1.19 (30)	14.88 (377.6)
Average snowfall inches (cm)	15.70 (39.9)	14.10 (35.8)	17.70 (45.0)	10.40 (26.4)	3.00 (7.6)	0.20 (0.51)	0.00 (0.00)	0.00 (0.00)	0.20 (0.51)	1.80 (4.6)	6.40 (16.3)	14.90 (37.8)	84.4 (214.42)
Source 1: NOAA
Source 2: XMACIS2 (records)

== Gallery ==
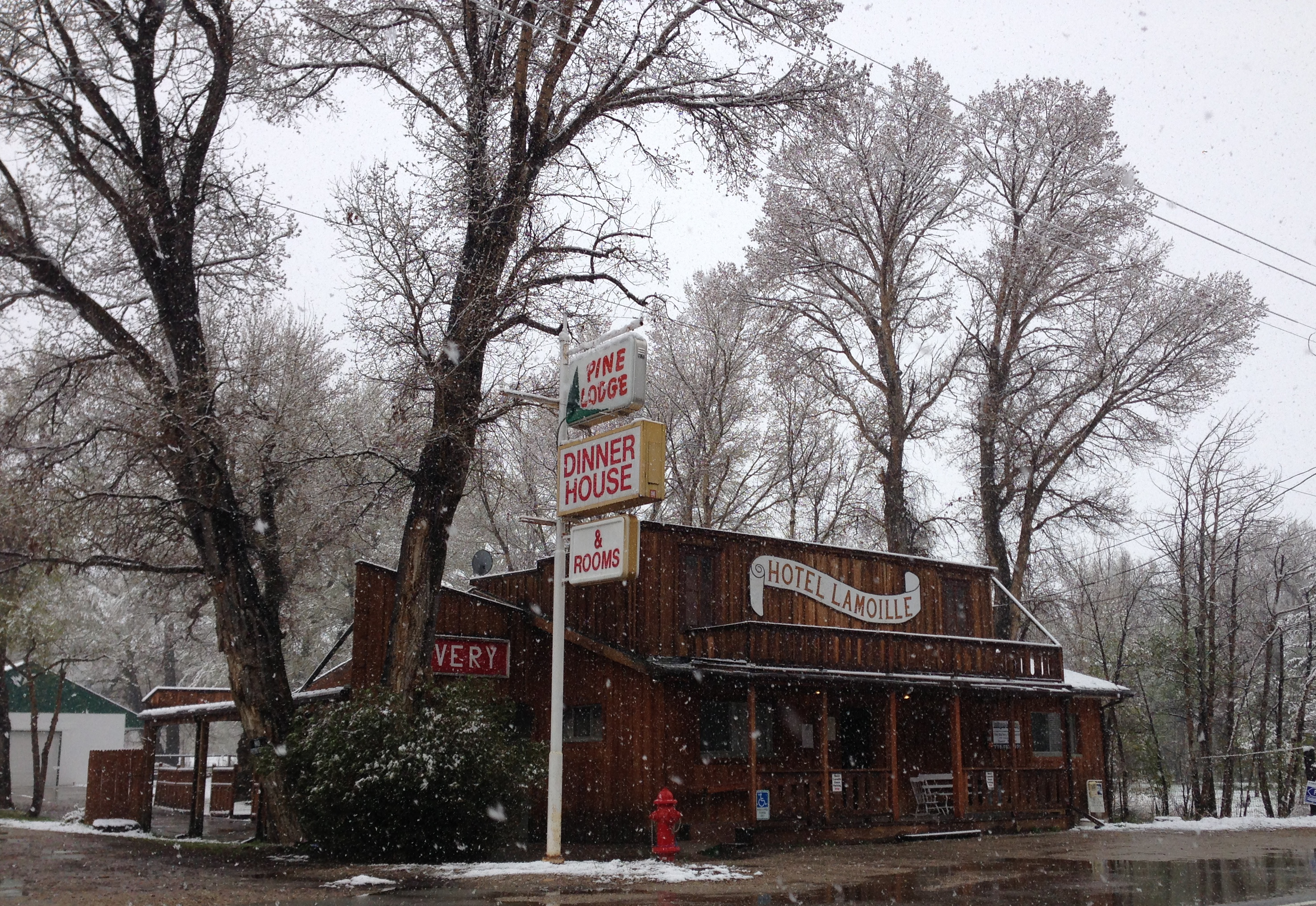
Snow at the Hotel Lamoille

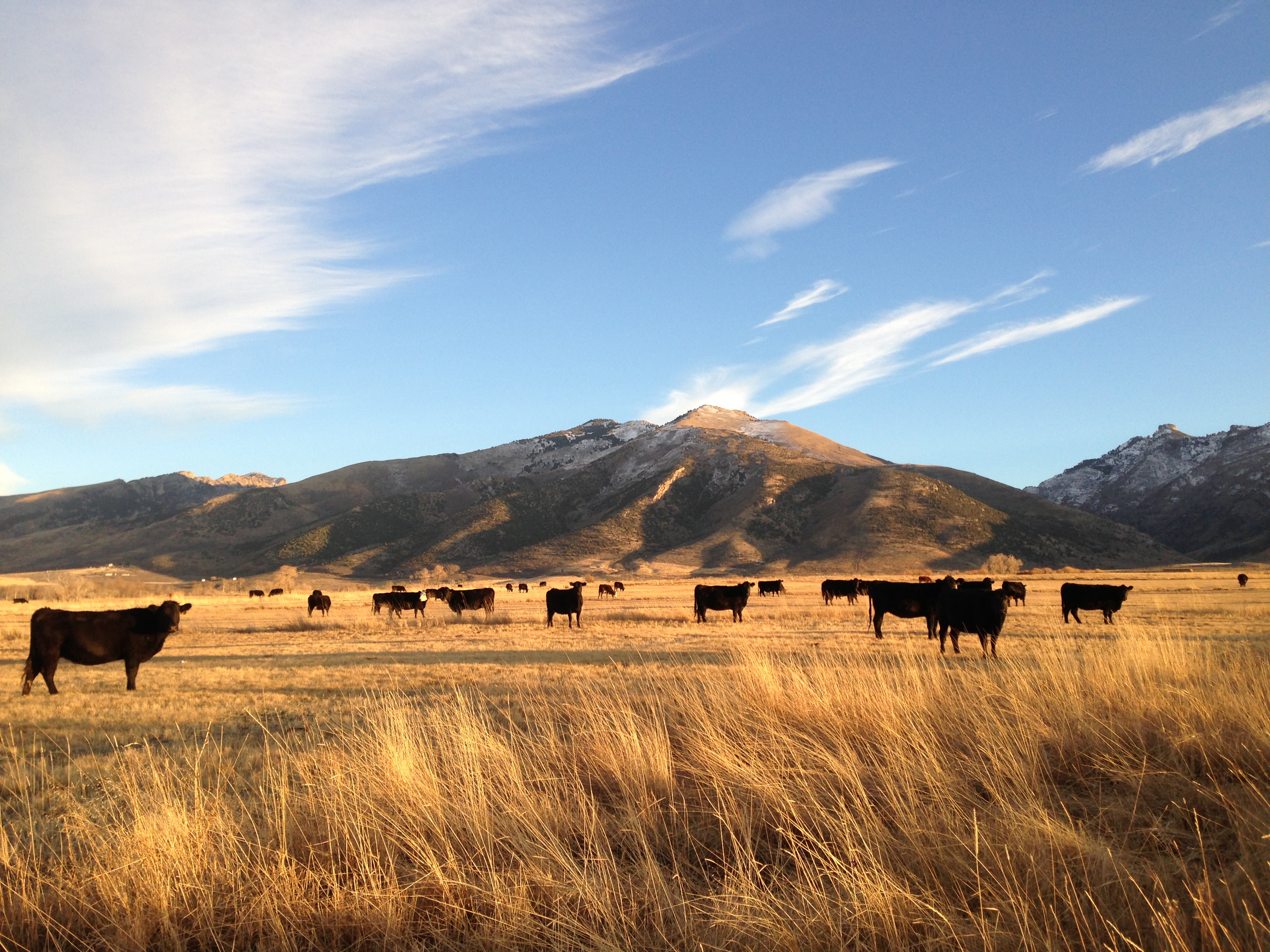
Cattle near Lamoille Canyon Road

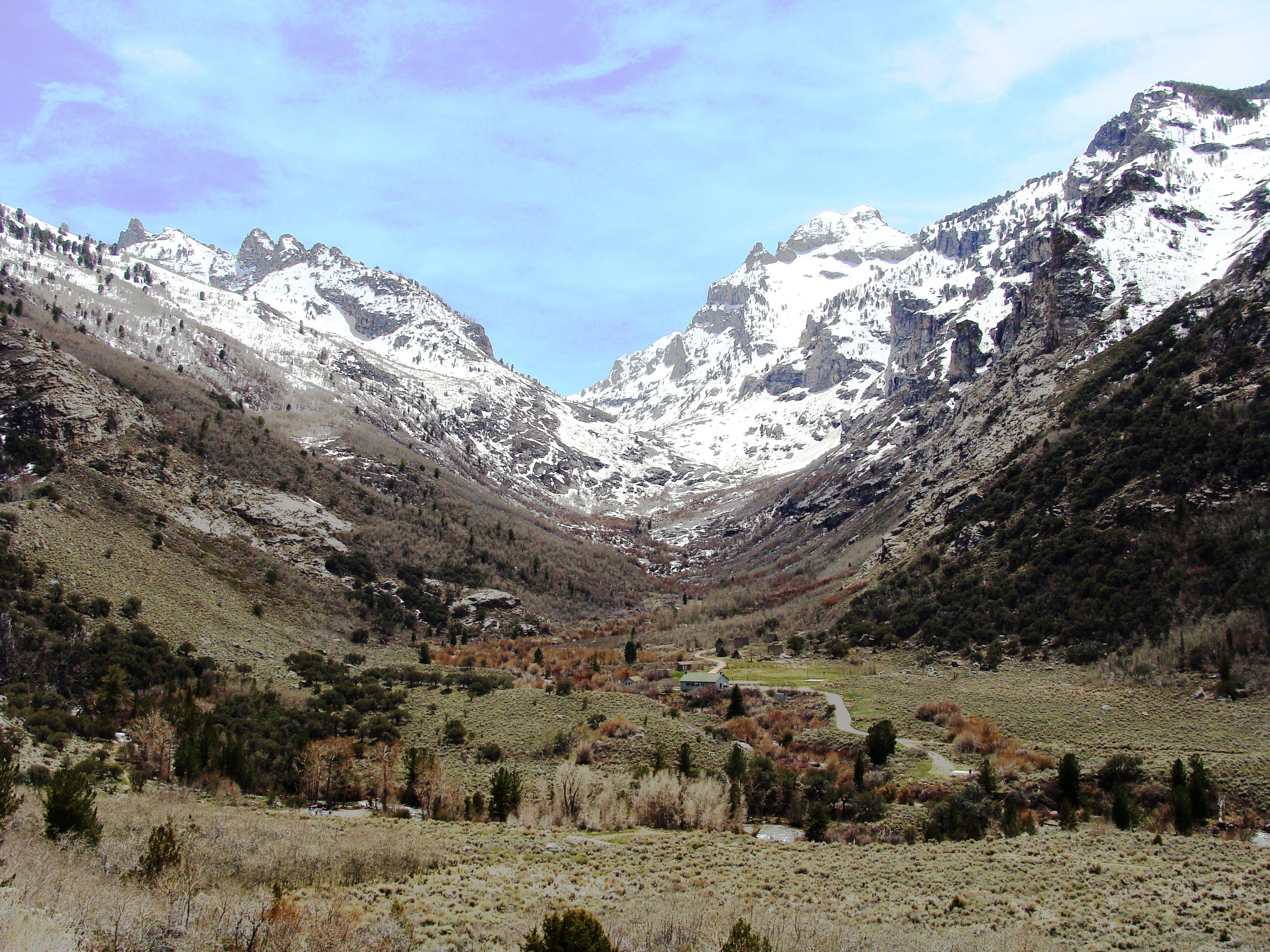
Lamoille Canyon

== See also ==
- List of census-designated places in Nevada
