= Ruby Mountains Wilderness =

Protected wilderness area in Nevada, US

- IUCN category Ib (wilderness area)
- Location within the United States
- Location: Elko County, Nevada, US
- Nearest city: Elko, NV
- Coordinates: 40°35′00″N 115°24′00″W
- Governing body: U.S. Forest Service

The Ruby Mountains Wilderness is a protected wilderness area in the Ruby Mountains of Elko County, Nevada, United States. It covers an area of approximately 90,000 acres (36,000 ha), and is administered by the Humboldt–Toiyabe National Forest.

Ruby Mountains Wilderness contains hiking trails ranging between 9,000 and 10,000 feet in elevation. Hiking destinations include Seitz Canyon and the Lamoille Lake Trail.

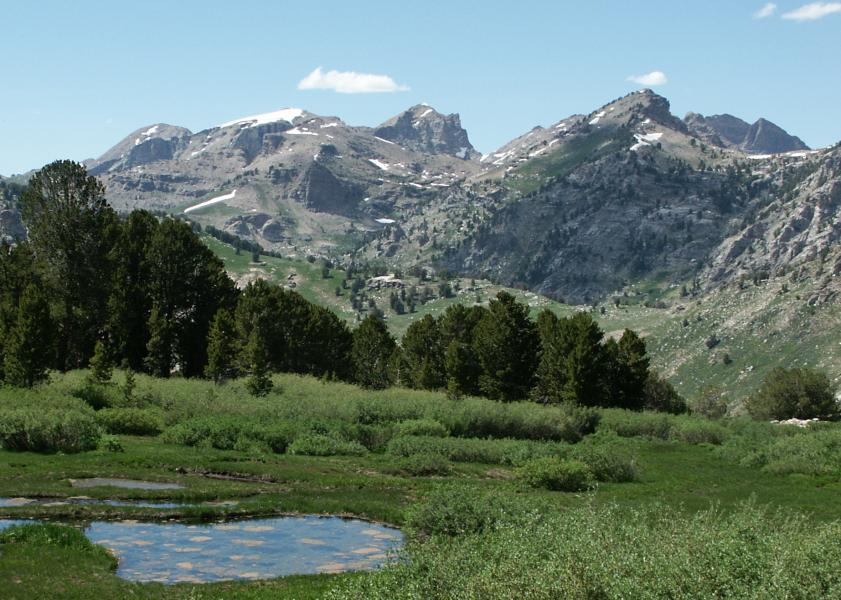
Ruby Mountains Wilderness
