= Nevada State Route 360 =

Highway in Nevada

State Route 360
- Mina–Basalt Cutoff Road
- SR 360 highlighted in red

Route information
- Maintained by NDOT
- Length: 23.245 mi (37.409 km)
- Existed: July 1, 1976–present

Major junctions
- South end: US 6 in Basalt
- North end: Future I-11 / US 95 south of Mina

Location
- Country: United States
- State: Nevada
- County: Mineral

Highway system
- Nevada State Highway System; Interstate; US; State; Pre‑1976; Scenic
← SR 359	→ SR 361

State Route 360 (SR 360) is a 23.245-mile-long (37.409 km) state highway in the southern portion of Mineral County, Nevada, United States. The route connects the former town of Basalt to the rest of Mineral County. A road has been in the place of SR 360 since 1919, and became State Route 10 by 1929.

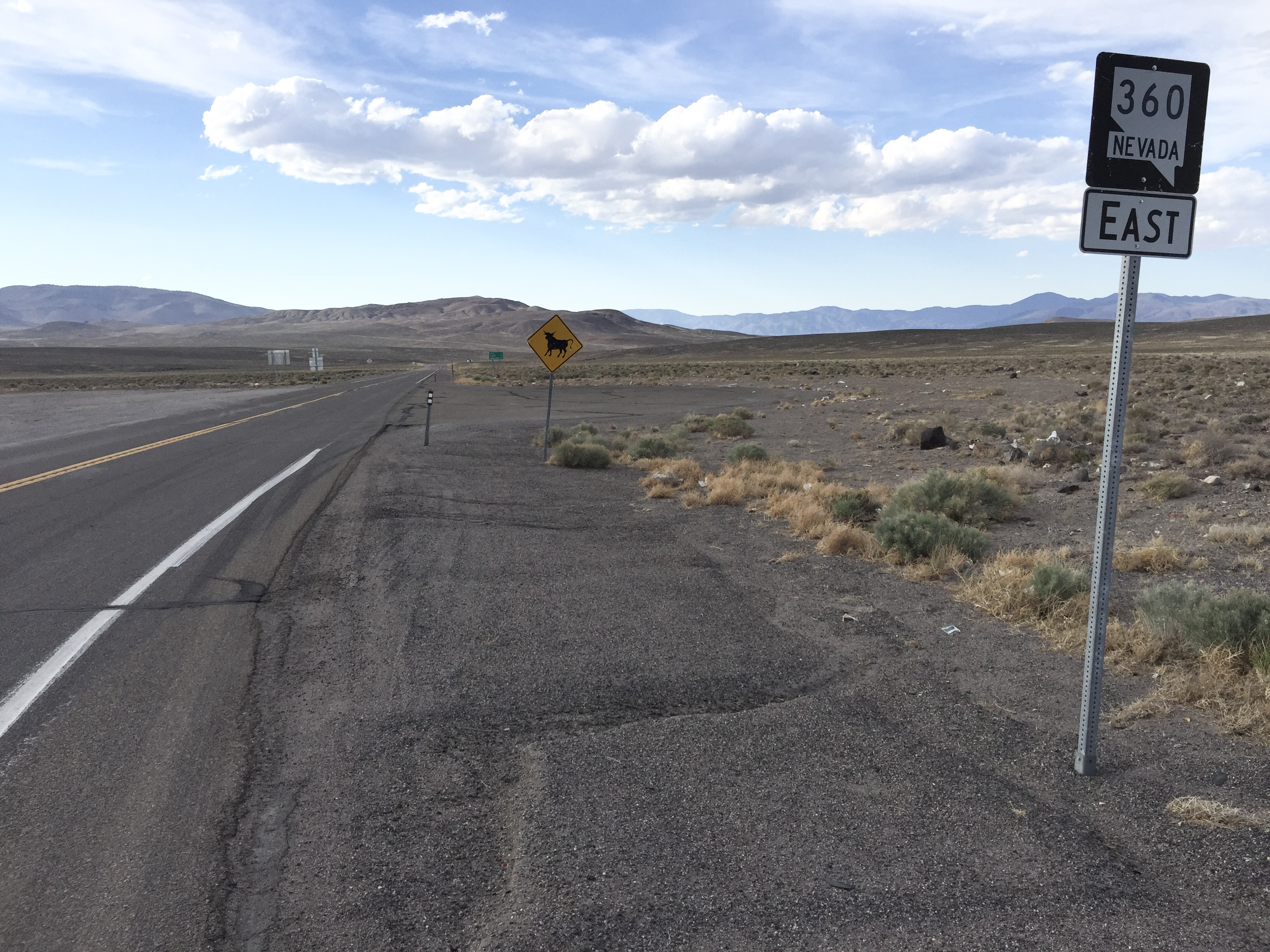
View from the south end of SR 360 looking northbound as seen in 2015

== Route description ==
State Route 360 begins near the border of the Inyo National Forest 12 miles (19 km) northeast of the California state line, at the site of the former town of Basalt on U.S. Route 6 (US 6). From there, the highway proceeds north for about 10 miles (16 km) before turning northeast to roughly parallel the Mineral–Esmeralda county line. The route winds around some mountains and valleys, including following the southeast tip of the Excelsior Mountains. SR 360 reaches its terminus at U.S. Route 95 near the former town of Rhodes, 8 miles (13 km) south of Mina.

== History ==
SR 360 is a part of former State Route 10

A route approximating the alignment of State Route 360 appears on maps as early as 1919. This road paralleled the path of the Southern Pacific Railroad from Rhodes through Basalt and into California. By 1929, the road had been designated as a part of State Route 10. The southern 12 miles (19 km), between the California state line and Basalt, had been paved by 1936. This section became part of US 6 when it was extended through Nevada in 1937. The remainder of SR 10 was paved by 1955.

Once the highway was paved, it remained relatively unchanged for several years. In 1976, Nevada began a renumbering of its state highways. In the route reassignment process, the portion of SR 10 concurrent with US 6 no longer carried a state highway number; the remainder of the highway north of Basalt became State Route 360. This action took place on July 1, 1976, and was first seen on state maps with the 1978 edition.

== Major intersections ==
The entire route is in Mineral County.

Location	mi	km	Destinations	Notes
Basalt	0.000	0.000	US 6 – Tonopah, Bishop	Southern terminus
	23.245	37.409	Future I-11 / US 95 – Hawthorne, Tonopah	Proposed interchange; northern terminus
1.000 mi = 1.609 km; 1.000 km = 0.621 mi
