= Carson and Colorado Railway =

Defunct railroad in the western US

- Slim Princess
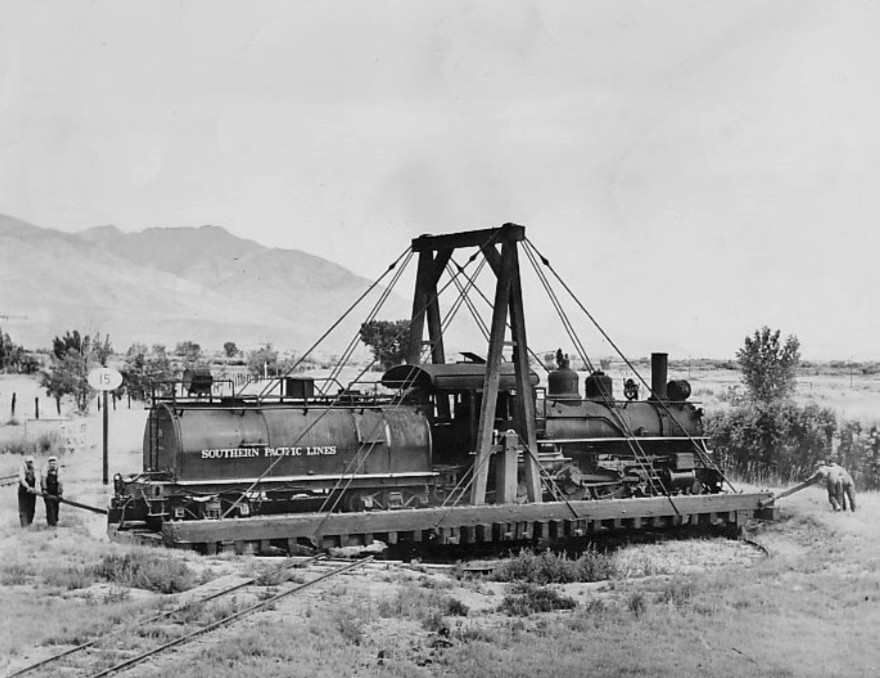
- Turntable in the Owens Valley

Overview
- Parent company: Southern Pacific Company (1900–1996); Union Pacific Railroad (1996–present)
- Locale: Nevada and California
- Dates of operation: 1880–1960 (narrow gauge)
- Successor: Modern revival of the C&C

Technical
- Track gauge: 3 ft (914 mm); 4 ft 8 1/2 in (1,435 mm)
- Length: 293 miles (470 km)

The Carson and Colorado Railway was a U.S. 3 ft (914 mm) narrow gauge railroad that ran from Mound House, Nevada, to Keeler, California, below the Cerro Gordo Mines. The narrow gauge track was chosen to reduce cost. The railroad served an arid area heavily dependent on mineral resources for economic activity. Much of the route now parallels U.S. Route 95 Alternate, U.S. Route 95, Nevada State Route 360, U.S. Route 6, and U.S. Route 395. After it was acquired by the Southern Pacific Railroad, the sprawling company romantically dubbed the route as the Slim Princess.

== History ==
=== The original company ===
As the Comstock Lode was winding down, a group which had benefited from the strike with connections to the Bank of California sought to exploit further potential strikes to the south. The company was incorporated on May 10, 1880, as the Carson and Colorado Railroad, and construction on the railroad began on May 31, 1880.

The Carson and Colorado began operations with a single Baldwin 4-4-0, the Candelaria. The first passenger train ran to Hawthorne in 1880 to show off the town site. Construction commenced in the second half of 1881, building south to Belleville by that December, then finally to Candelaria the following March. This was initially indicated to be the road's terminal for a time, but the company began construction south into the Owens Valley in 1882 with the intention to connect to the Southern Pacific Railroad at Mojave. Interchanging with the railroads under the same corporate control at both ends of the railway seemed unlikely, but even an incomplete line was seen as having potential for mineral traffic. Finally, trains arrived at Keeler on August 1, 1883. The route reached an altitude of 7,100 feet (2,200 m) in Montgomery Pass. A short spur line from Hawthorne to Cottonwood was built to carry lumber, operating between 1891 and 1902.

The line showed profit for its first few years, even in an incomplete state, but the mining districts served had already bust. The three constituent companies which built and operated the line were reorganized as the Carson and Colorado Railway in 1892 to reduce accumulated debt.

=== Sale to the Southern Pacific ===
Within a few years after its inception, the Carson and Colorado became a hindrance to the Virginia and Truckee Railroad (V&T), the parent company of the C&C, which sold the line to the Southern Pacific Company in 1900. Darius Ogden Mills (part owner) was once quoted saying "Gentlemen, we either built the line 300 miles too long, or 300 years too soon!" Silver and gold discoveries at Tonopah, Nevada and Goldfield, Nevada provided a major boost of revenues shortly after the Southern Pacific purchase. Initially planned as part of the railroad's more direct route between Los Angeles and Salt Lake City, the death of C.P. Huntington in 1901 would doom those plans as the Union Pacific Railroad became more tightly integrated to the Southern Pacific. From the time of the purchase until 1905, all of the C&C’s freight traveled over the V&T's trackage from Mound House to Reno, and vice versa. Because of the changeover from 3-foot (0.91 m) narrow gauge to standard gauge cars, all the freight had to be handled by hand at Mound House, which caused a great bottleneck, especially after the mining booms of Tonopah and Goldfield. Southern Pacific (SP) proffered an offer to purchase the V&T, but the price was considered too high. As a result, the SP began constructing the Hazen cutoff, which circumvented the V&T entirely after it opened. The northern 140 miles (230 km) from Mound House to Mina, Nevada was converted to 4 ft 8 1/2 in (1,435 mm) standard gauge in 1905; and the remaining C&C was merged into the Southern Pacific's 3 ft (914 mm) narrow gauge subsidiary, the Nevada and California Railroad. (The line between Tonopah Junction and Mina was laid to a dual gauge, allowing access to Mina's shops.) A new standard gauge line was run south of Owenyo after 1911, but it was mostly constructed to facilitate construction of the Los Angeles Aqueduct. This left a break of gauge where passengers were forced to transfer to the narrow gauge line to travel through the Owens Valley, and Southern Pacific did not intend to rectify this situation. The Nevada and California Railroad was reorganized into the Central Pacific Railroad in 1912.

=== End of narrow gauge operations ===
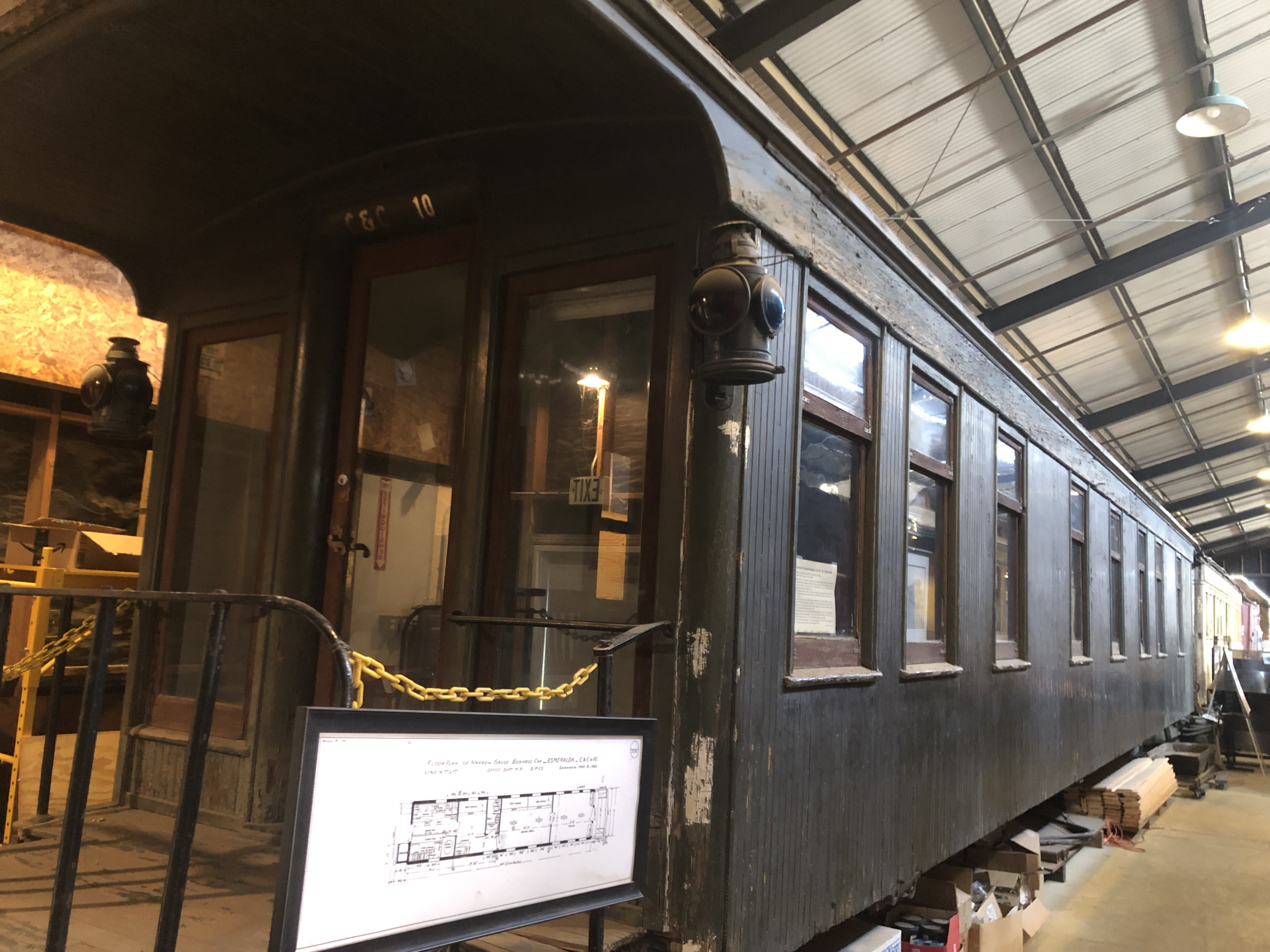
Carson & Colorado #10, originally a combination business car and caboose, later named the "Esmeralda," at the Southern California Railway Museum.

In the early 20th century, it operated under the name "Southern Pacific Keeler Branch". Traffic on the north end was bolstered with the construction of the U.S. Naval Ammunition Depot at Hawthorne in 1928. Portions of the line were abandoned in the 1930s and the 1940s. The Mixed train service ceased in 1956. The last narrow gauge common carrier made its final run on April 29, 1960. The rails were removed in January, 1961.

=== The modern line ===
The northern segment of line continued operation to serve the Hawthorne Army Depot. Tracks between Mina and Thorne were abandoned in the late 1980s, bringing the active line to 57 miles (92 km) in length. The United States Army purchased the remaining segment of the line south of Wabuska in 1991 and set about upgrading tracks and bridges. By 2016, trains ran weekly as far south as Wabuska, with infrequent runs further to the Army Depot.

== Locomotives ==
Number	Builder	Type	Date	Works number	Notes
1st #1	Baldwin Locomotive Works	4-4-0	1880	5285	sold to Eureka and Palisade Railroad 1907. later to Oregon Lumber Company. scrapped. the tender cistern is believed to be part of an irrigation dam in Oregon.
2nd #1	Baldwin Locomotive Works	2-8-0	1914	41300	ex-Nevada-California-Oregon Railway #14 acquired 1928 sold to Nevada County Narrow Gauge Railroad #9 1933. later to US Navy. lost to the Philippines in 1946.
3rd #1	General Electric	50 Tonner	1954	32226	sold 1961
2	Baldwin Locomotive Works	4-4-0	1881	5428	scrapped 1907
1st #3	Baldwin Locomotive Works	4-4-0	1881	5430	scrapped 1908
2nd #3	Baldwin Locomotive Works	4-4-0	1887	8791	ex-Nevada-California-Oregon Railway #3 acquired 1928 scrapped 1934
1st #4	Baldwin Locomotive Works	4-4-0	1881	5782	sold to Nevada County Narrow Gauge Railroad #7 1929. scrapped in 1934.
2nd #4	Baldwin Locomotive Works	4-6-0	1899	17124	ex-Nevada-California-Oregon Railway #4 acquired 1928 scrapped 1934
1st #5	Baldwin Locomotive Works	4-4-0	1882	6089	scrapped 1932
2nd #5	Baldwin Locomotive Works	4-6-0	1899	17123	ex-Nevada-California-Oregon Railway #5 acquired 1928 scrapped 1934
1st #6	Baldwin Locomotive Works	4-4-0	1882	6090	scrapped 1907
2nd #6	Baldwin Locomotive Works	4-4-0	1877	4223	ex-South Pacific Coast Railroad #6 merged 1905 scrapped 1926
3rd #6	Baldwin Locomotive Works	4-6-0	1903	22020	ex-Nevada-California-Oregon Railway #6 acquired 1928 scrapped 1934
1st #7	Baldwin Locomotive Works	4-4-0	1883	6687	scrapped 1932
2nd #7	Baldwin Locomotive Works	4-6-0	1903	22012	ex-Nevada-California-Oregon Railway #7 acquired 1928 scrapped 1935
1st #8	Baldwin Locomotive Works	4-4-0	1883	6689	scrapped 1932
2nd #8	Baldwin Locomotive Works	4-6-0	1907	31445	ex-Nevada-California-Oregon Railway #8 acquired 1928 donated to Sparks, Nevada 1955. on display in Lillard Park.
1st #9	Baldwin Locomotive Works	4-4-0	1885	7604	ex-South Pacific Coast Railroad #16 merged 1905 scrapped 1911
2nd #9	Baldwin Locomotive Works	4-6-0	1909	34035	ex-Nevada-California-Oregon Railway #9 acquired 1928 donated to Laws, California 1960. on display at the Laws Railroad Museum.
10	Baldwin Locomotive Works	4-4-0	1885	7605	ex-South Pacific Coast Railroad #17 merged 1905 scrapped 1933
11	Baldwin Locomotive Works	2-6-0	1881	5649	ex-South Pacific Coast Railroad #11 merged 1905 rebuilt to 4-6-0 1924 scrapped 1934
12	Baldwin Locomotive Works	2-6-0	1881	5650	ex-South Pacific Coast Railroad #12 merged 1905 rebuilt to 4-6-0 1924 scrapped 1934
13	Baldwin Locomotive Works	2-8-0	1882	6157	ex-South Pacific Coast Railroad #13 merged 1905 scrapped 1927
14	Baldwin Locomotive Works	4-6-0	1886	7939	ex-South Pacific Coast Railroad #18 merged 1905 retired 1945
15	Baldwin Locomotive Works	4-6-0	1889	9929	ex-South Pacific Coast Railroad #22 merged 1905 scrapped 1935
16	Baldwin Locomotive Works	4-6-0	1886	7941	ex-South Pacific Coast Railroad #19 merged 1905 scrapped 1935
17	Baldwin Locomotive Works	4-6-0	1887	8487	ex-South Pacific Coast Railroad #21 merged 1905 retired 1945, then used to provide steam for the SP engine terminal at Salem, Oregon until scrapped 1952.
18	Baldwin Locomotive Works	4-6-0	1911	37395	ex-Nevada-California-Oregon Railway #12 acquired 1928 donated to Independence, California 1955. On display and operated by the Eastern California Museum.
22	Schenectady Locomotive Works	4-6-0	1899	5399	ex- Florence and Cripple Creek Railroad then Nevada-California-Oregon Railway #22 acquired 1929 scrapped 1949

== Towns and railroad stations served ==
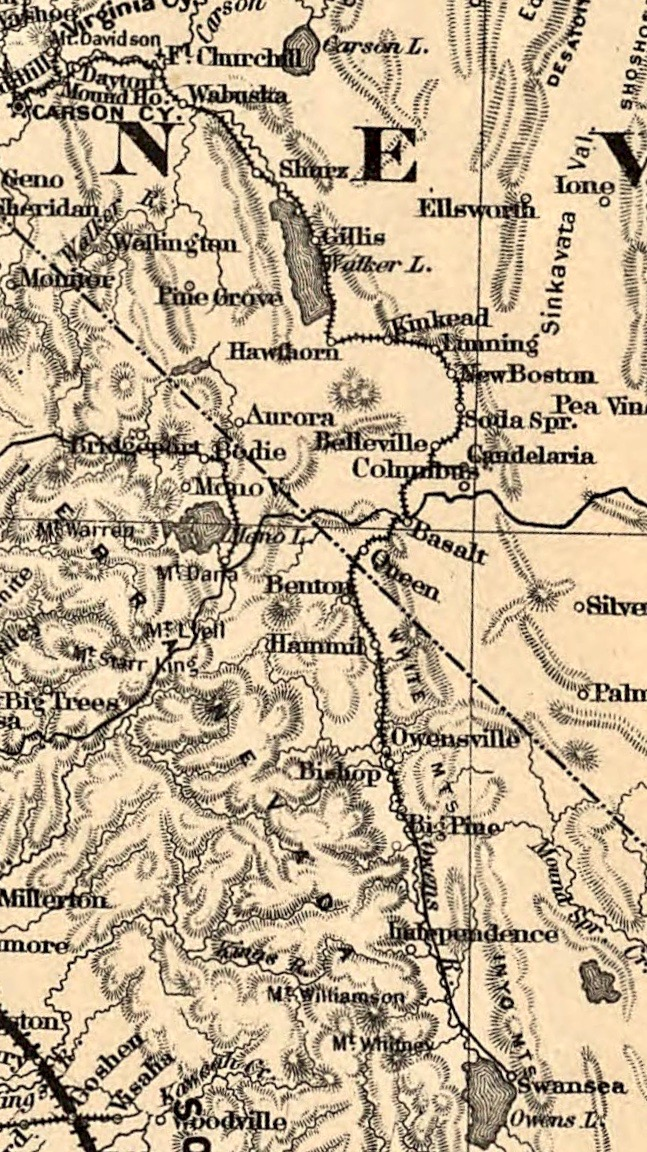
Route in 1883

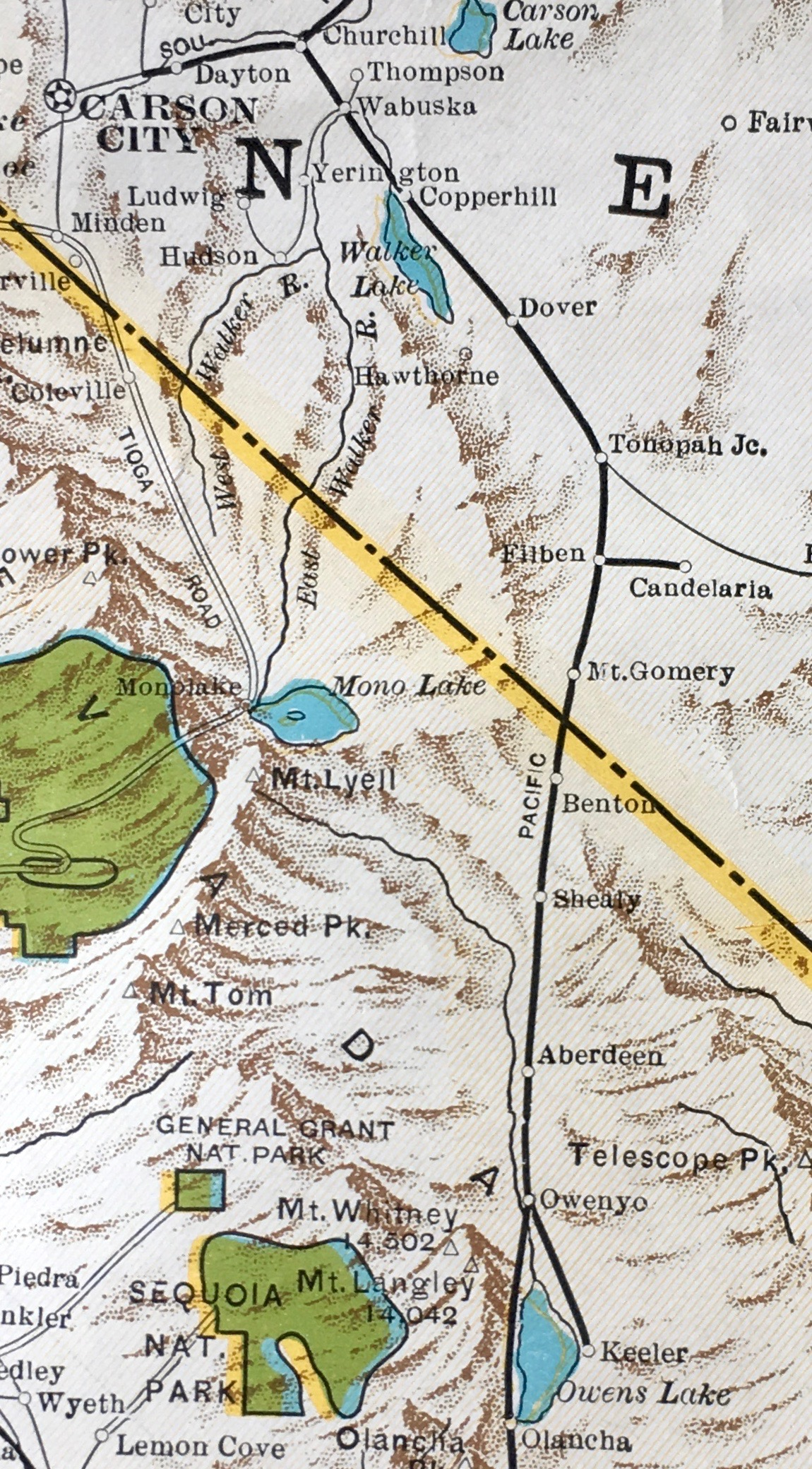
Route as of 1931

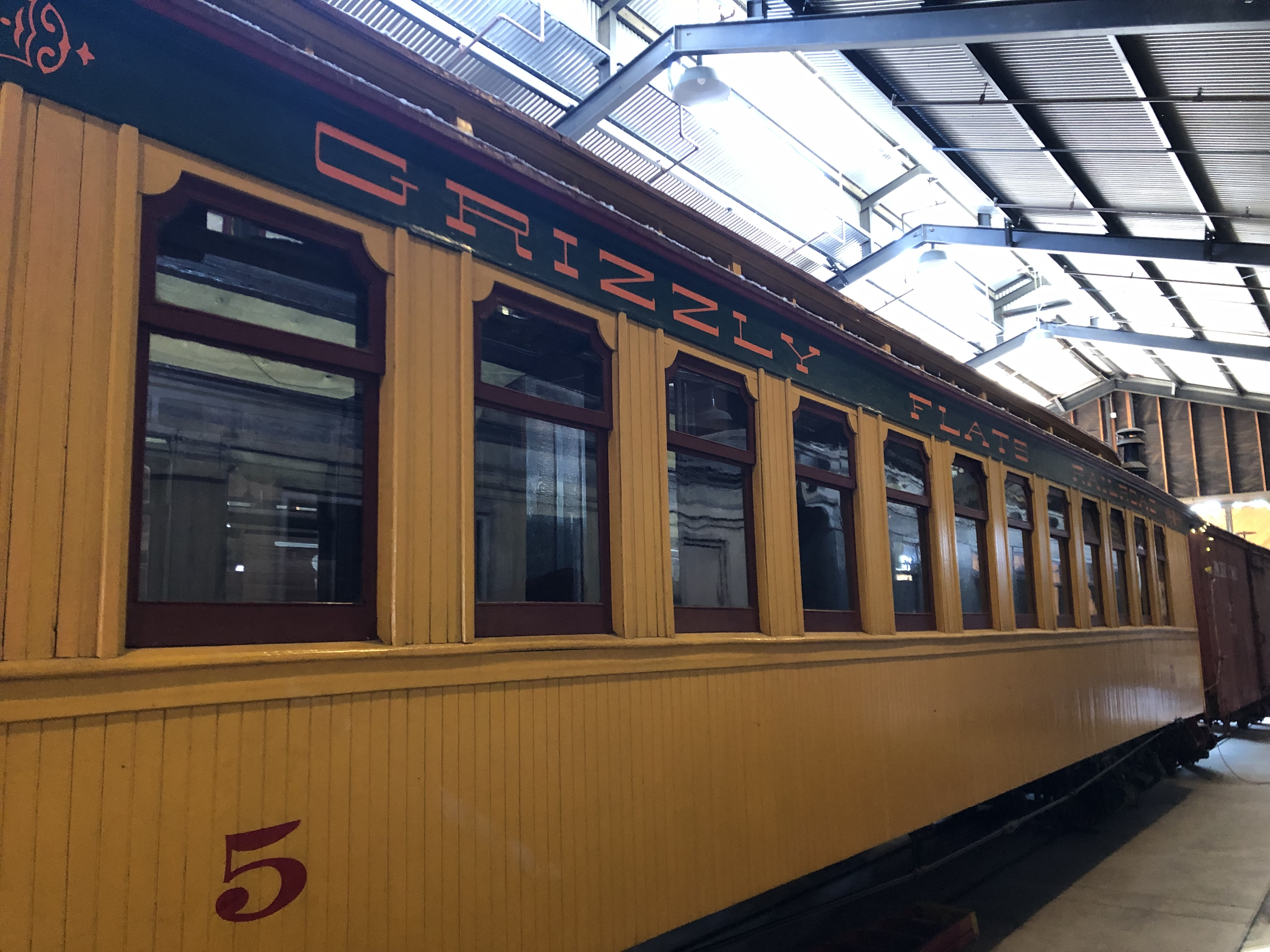
Carson & Colorado coach #5, one of the railroad's first six passenger cars purchased, at the Southern California Railway Museum.

The following were towns or stops along the line:

- Mound House, Nevada (V&T Railroad to Carson City and Virginia City)
- Dayton, Nevada
- Fort Churchill, Nevada
- Wabuska, Nevada (Copper Belt Railway to Yerington)
- Lux, Nevada
- Moquist, Nevada
- Rio Vista, Nevada
- Schurz, Nevada
- Stuckey, Nevada
- Copperhill, Nevada
- Gillis, Nevada
- Rand, Nevada
- Magnus, Nevada
- Walker, Nevada
- Thorne, Nevada
- Hawthorne, Nevada (branch to Cottonwood)
- Cottonwood, Nevada (branch only)
- Kinkead, Nevada
- Luning, Nevada
- New Boston, Nevada
- Mina, Nevada
- Sodaville, Nevada (Soda Springs)
- Rhodes, Nevada
- Tonopah Junction, Nevada (Tonopah and Goldfield Railroad)
- Belleville, Nevada
- Filben, Nevada (spur to Candelaria)
- Candelaria, Nevada (spur only)
- Basalt, Nevada
- Summit, Nevada (Mt. Montgomery)
- Queen, Nevada
- Benton, California
- Hammil Valley, California
- Laws, California, Owensville
- Zurich, California
- Monola, California (formerly Alvord)
- Kearsarge, California
- Manzanar, California
- Owenyo, California (Southern Pacific Railroad to Lone Pine, Ridgecrest, and Los Angeles)
- Alico, California
- Dolomite, California
- Mock, California
- Swansea, California
- Keeler, California

== Restoration effort ==
In Independence, California, a non-profit group re-incorporated the Carson and Colorado Railway. They have restored locomotive #18, which was left in Independence in excellent condition by the Southern Pacific in 1955. The locomotive moved under its own power for the first time in 62 years on Saturday October 15, 2016. The locomotive is currently housed in a two stall engine house at the Eastern California Museum in Independence, CA. There is close to 1,000 feet (300 m) of track for it to operate on. Former SP boxcars #1C and #15 are on rail with engine #18 as part of the exhibit.

== Other Surviving Relics of the Carson & Colorado ==
Other Carson & Colorado locomotives are preserved at the Laws Railroad Museum, and in Lillard Park in Sparks, Nevada, as noted in the Locomotives section above.

The Southern California Railway Museum has a replica Carson & Colorado turntable, several cars from the Carson & Colorado, and the railroad’s water tank that was originally at Keeler, California (which is currently being rebuilt). The cars at the museum which spent part of their lives on the C&C line include two stock cars (SP 65 and SP 157), two gondolas (SP 216 and SP 223), a boxcar (SP 449), a coach (Grizzly Flats Railroad #5), and a business car (Carson & Colorado #10, the “Esmeralda”).

The “Esmeralda” is extremely rare - a narrow-gauge combination business car and caboose. The front third of the car was for the conductor and rear brakeman (and had a cupola on top), and the rear two-thirds was the business car portion to haul railroad executives and important shippers. After the Southern Pacific bought the Carson & Colorado RR, it converted the caboose portion of the car into a galley.

== See also ==
- Southern Pacific 8
- Southern Pacific 9
- Southern Pacific 18

== Sources ==
- Guide to the Carson & Colorado Railroad Company records, 1881–1901, at The Bancroft Library
- A Guide to the Carson and Colorado Railroad Records, NC71. Special Collections, University Libraries, University of Nevada, Reno.
