= Luning, Nevada =

Unincorporated community in Mineral County, Nevada, United States

- Unincorporated town
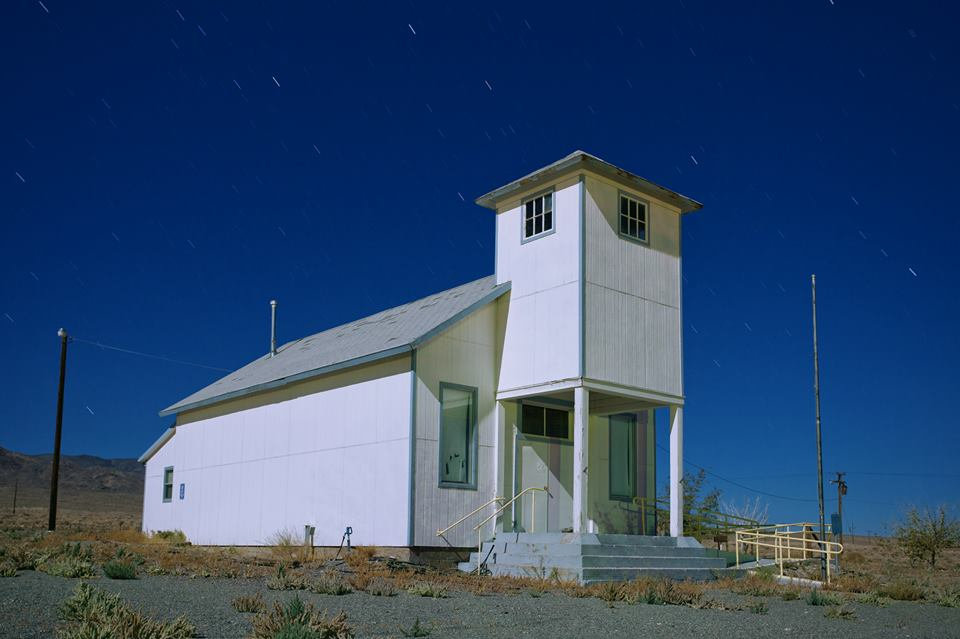
- Full moon night at a school house in Luning

- Location within the state of Nevada Luning (the United States)
- Coordinates: 38°30′23″N 118°10′53″W
- Country: United States
- State: Nevada
- County: Mineral
- Founded: 1881; 145 years ago
- Named for: Nicholas B. Luning
- Time zone: UTC-8 (PST)
  - Summer (DST): UTC-7 (PDT)
- ZIP codes: 89420
- Area code: 775

Luning (formerly Deep Wells) is an unincorporated town in Mineral County, Nevada, United States.

== Description ==
Luning is located on U.S. Route 95, between Hawthorne and Mina. Luning had an active railroad loading facility for many years. Magnesium ore from Gabbs was trucked to Luning and transferred to railroad cars bound for the West in World War II. The Basic Refractories mine in Gabbs was opened in 1955; it produced magnesium that was also trucked to the Luning loading platform, where most men in town worked.

A sign on the Long Branch Saloon says "Settled 1864." The saloon - still open in 1980 - has since closed. The town's one-room school is well maintained, but is also closed. It is often listed as a ghost town, but it is not. The population of Luning, Nevada, as of 2005 is 87. There is also an active page for the "ghost" town on Facebook, maintained by residents.

The town once had a small store with attached gas station, a saloon, volunteer fire department station, and a post office. Except for the post office at 202 Plymire Street, all have since closed. The ZIP Code of Luning is 89420. Luning has two recent improvements: Cell phones and an improvement to their highway rest area.

== Name ==
A station on the Southern Pacific Railroad between Thorne and Mina as a supply center for the Nevada Brucite quarry. Named for Nicholas B. Luning, a bondholder of the Carson and Colorado Railway. The town originally called Deep Wells started in 1881 and changed its name to Luning when the railroad arrived. The post office opened in 1882.

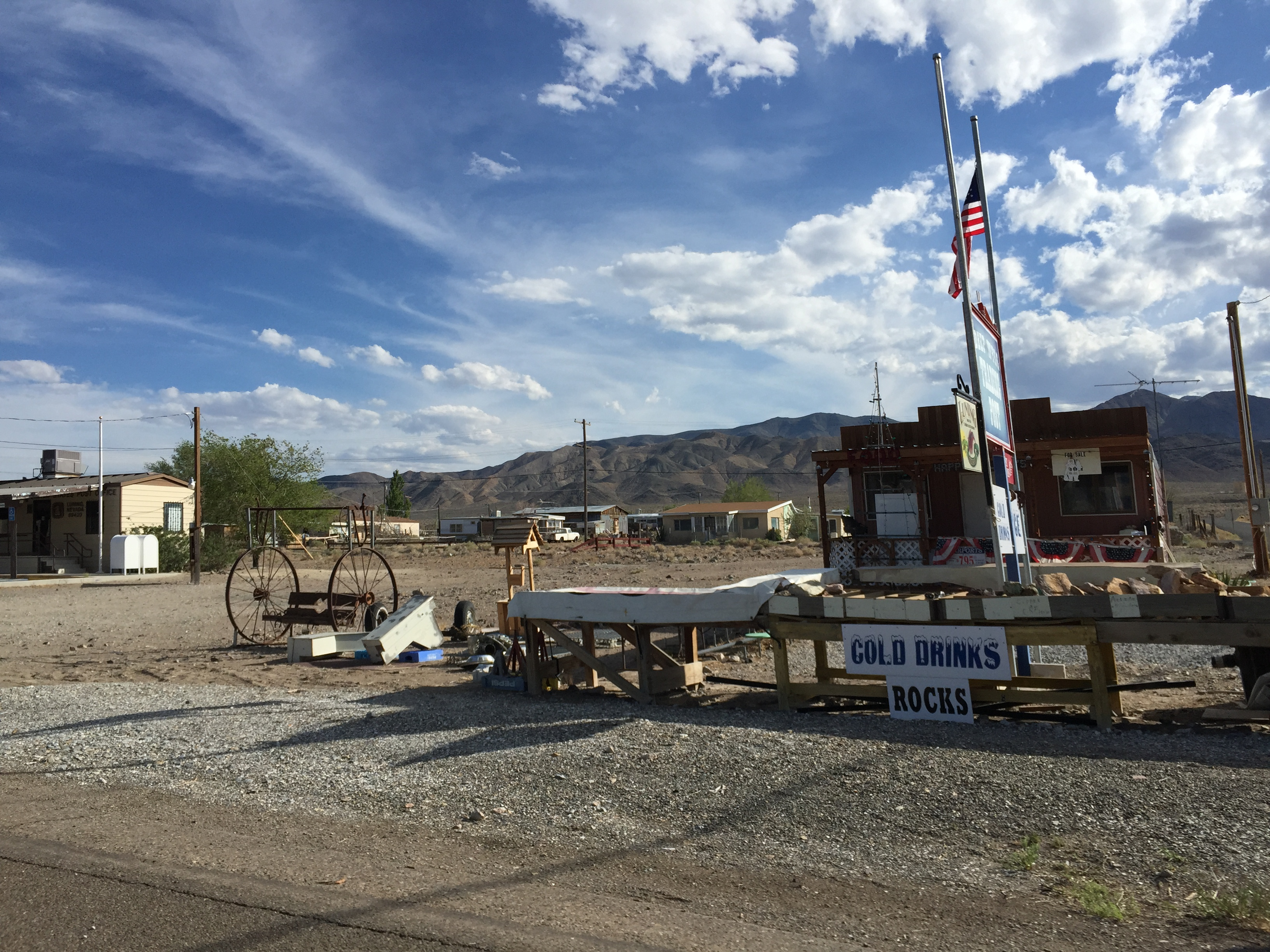
Buildings in Luning

=== Main Street ===
Luning's main street - Plymire Street - is named after a long-time resident, Dr. Fred A. Plymire.

Fred was a dentist, an inventor, and a stone man. Born in West Virginia in 1867, he traveled with his parents and five siblings to California where the family operated a marble monument company.

In 1894, Dr. Fred is listed in Stone, an illustrated magazine, in Notes from Quarry and Shop: “Fred Plymire, recently of Vallejo, and L. McCoy from Red Bluff, will establish marble works in Redding, Cal.” Fred is listed in the Official Catalogue of Exhibitors; Panama-Pacific International Exposition, San Francisco, 1915, Department of Mines and Metallurgy, State of Nevada, Group 153; Plymire, Dr. F. A., Mina. Polished marble.

Dr Fred is listed in 1910 in the San Francisco Genealogy, Ancient and Accepted Scottish Rite List of Members. “California Bodies” Comprised California Lodge of Perfection, No. 10; California Chapter of Rose Crois, No. 7; California Council of Kadosh, No. 7; California Consistory, No. 5. Dr. Fred holds a patent for an improved carburetor.

After 20 years in Luning, Dr. Fred returned to California where he retired. He died in 1929 at Napa State Hospital in "general paralysis of insane."

== Climate ==
The Köppen Climate System classifies the weather in this area as semi-arid, abbreviated BSk. This climate type occurs primarily on the periphery of true deserts in low-latitude semiarid steppe regions.

Climate data for Luning, Nevada
Month	Jan	Feb	Mar	Apr	May	Jun	Jul	Aug	Sep	Oct	Nov	Dec	Year
Mean daily maximum °F (°C)	47 (8)	53 (12)	62 (17)	68 (20)	77 (25)	86 (30)	96 (36)	94 (34)	85 (29)	72 (22)	57 (14)	48 (9)	70 (21)
Mean daily minimum °F (°C)	24 (−4)	28 (−2)	33 (1)	37 (3)	46 (8)	54 (12)	62 (17)	60 (16)	52 (11)	42 (6)	31 (−1)	25 (−4)	41 (5)
Average precipitation inches (mm)	0.4 (10)	0.5 (13)	0.4 (10)	0.4 (10)	0.7 (18)	0.4 (10)	0.3 (7.6)	0.2 (5.1)	0.2 (5.1)	0.2 (5.1)	0.4 (10)	0.2 (5.1)	4.2 (110)
Source: Weatherbase
