= Thorne, Nevada =

- Railroad junction
- Location within Nevada Location within the United States
- Country: United States
- State: Nevada
- County: Mineral
- Named for: Shortened form of Hawthorne, Nevada. Thorne is seven miles northeast of Hawthorne.
- Elevation: 4,196 ft (1,279 m)
- GNIS feature ID: 844291

Thorne, Nevada is a rail junction and former town located in Mineral County, Nevada.

In 1881, Thorne was a station on the Carson and Colorado Railway. In 1905, the spur line to Hawthorne was abandoned and Thorne became the terminus for Hawthorne. In 1909 and 1910, Thorne "became a very busy place" because of the boom at the Lucky Boy Mine and was reported to have two saloons. Thorne's post office operated from July 1912 until September 1921. In 1929, construction of the nearby Hawthorne Army Depot started with Thorne being the shipping point. In 1937, Thorne was served by the Hazen Mina branch of the Southern Pacific Railroad. At the start of World War II, Thorne was handling 380 car loads per month, with traffic peaking at 5000 cars per month during the war. In 1983, the Thorne Depot and the Wabuska Railroad Station were scheduled to be demolished. The Thorne Depot was eventually demolished, though some parts from it were moved with the Wabuska Railroad Station to the Nevada State Railroad Museum.

In 2016, it was reported that trains from Wabuska, Nevada to Thorne were infrequent, most of the traffic served the Hawthorne Army Depot.
