= Belleville, Nevada =

- Ghost town
- Location within Nevada Location within the United States
- Coordinates: 38°13′09″N 118°10′47″W
- Country: United States
- State: Nevada
- County: Mineral
- Elevation: 5,190 ft (1,582 m)
- Time zone: UTC-8 (Pacific (PST))
  - Summer (DST): UTC-7 (PDT)
- GNIS feature ID: 854361

Nevada Historical Marker
- Reference no.: 154

Belleville, in Mineral County, Nevada, United States, was a mining town that rose up around the milling of ore shipped in from nearby mines. Today it is a ghost town.

== History ==
Belleville was founded in 1873 or 1874 and its primary industry was the mill processing ore from the Northern Belle Mine at Candelaria. The mill was located just east of the present-day historical marker. Its first bullion bar shipment of $9,200 was made in April 1875. The town was famed for a "Wild West" atmosphere; murders, drunken brawls, and "sporting" practical jokes were commonplace. When the Carson and Colorado Railroad reached the town in 1882 its population was 500, and the town was served by a doctor, assay office, express office, telegraph station, livery stable, school, two hotels, restaurants, and blacksmith shops as well as by seven saloons.

The post office was in operation from December 1874 until 1894.

By 1892 water piped to Candelaria allowed the ore to be milled nearer the mine, and Belleville was deserted except for a brief revival from 1915 until 1918 during which a post office was in operation.
