= 1996 United States presidential election in Nevada =

- November 5, 1996

Nominee	Bill Clinton	Bob Dole	Ross Perot
Party	Democratic	Republican	Reform
Home state	Arkansas	Kansas	Texas
Running mate	Al Gore	Jack Kemp	Pat Choate
Electoral vote	4	0	0
Popular vote	203,974	199,244	43,986
Percentage	43.93%	42.91%	9.47%
County results
Clinton
40–50%
Dole
40–50%
50–60%
President before election
Bill Clinton
Democratic
Elected President
Bill Clinton
Democratic

The 1996 United States presidential election in Nevada took place on November 5, 1996, as part of the 1996 United States presidential election. Voters chose four representatives, or electors to the Electoral College, who voted for president and vice president.

A swing state, Nevada was narrowly won by incumbent Democratic President Bill Clinton. Clinton took a 43.93% plurality of the popular vote over Republican challenger Bob Dole, who took 42.91%, a victory margin of 1.02%. Reform Party candidate Ross Perot finished in third, with 9.47% of the popular vote.

This is the last presidential election in which any candidate won Nevada without carrying Washoe County until 2024 and the last time Mineral County voted Democratic. Clinton became the first Democrat to win the White House without carrying White Pine County since Grover Cleveland in 1892.

== Results ==
1996 United States presidential election in Nevada
Party	Candidate	Votes	Percentage	Electoral votes
Democratic	Bill Clinton (incumbent)	203,974	43.93%	4
Republican	Bob Dole	199,244	42.91%	0
Reform	Ross Perot	43,986	9.47%	0
N/A	None of these Candidates	5,608	1.21%	0
Green	Ralph Nader	4,730	1.02%	0
Libertarian	Harry Browne	4,460	0.96%	0
Independent American	Howard Phillips	1,732	0.37%	0
Natural Law	John Hagelin	545	0.12%	0
Totals		464,279	100.00%	4

=== Results by county ===
County	Bill Clinton Democratic		Bob Dole Republican		Ross Perot Reform		No Candidate None of the Above		Ralph Nader Green		Various candidates Other parties		Margin		Total
County	#	%	#	%	#	%	#	%	#	%	#	%	#	%	Total
Carson City	7,269	38.64%	9,168	48.73%	1,591	8.46%	272	1.45%	263	1.40%	251	1.33%	-1,899	-10.09%	18,814
Churchill	2,282	29.40%	4,369	56.28%	821	10.58%	125	1.61%	56	0.72%	110	1.42%	-2,087	-26.88%	7,763
Clark	127,963	48.71%	103,431	39.37%	23,177	8.82%	2,655	1.01%	1,902	0.72%	3,582	1.36%	24,532	9.34%	262,710
Douglas	5,109	31.73%	8,828	54.83%	1,486	9.23%	211	1.31%	230	1.43%	236	1.47%	-3,719	-23.10%	16,100
Elko	3,149	26.56%	6,512	54.92%	1,539	12.98%	195	1.64%	92	0.78%	370	3.12%	-3,363	-28.36%	11,857
Esmeralda	140	25.64%	277	50.73%	91	16.67%	14	2.56%	7	1.28%	17	3.11%	-137	-25.09%	546
Eureka	158	22.97%	412	59.88%	90	13.08%	17	2.47%	4	0.58%	7	1.02%	-254	-36.91%	688
Humboldt	1,467	31.96%	2,334	50.85%	603	13.14%	82	1.79%	41	0.89%	63	1.37%	-867	-18.89%	4,590
Lander	660	29.80%	1,107	49.98%	361	16.30%	37	1.67%	14	0.63%	36	1.63%	-447	-20.18%	2,215
Lincoln	499	27.99%	936	52.50%	255	14.30%	40	2.24%	10	0.56%	43	2.41%	-437	-24.51%	1,783
Lyon	3,419	35.25%	4,753	49.01%	1,104	11.38%	134	1.38%	113	1.17%	176	1.81%	-1,334	-13.76%	9,699
Mineral	1,068	46.07%	814	35.12%	361	15.57%	34	1.47%	23	0.99%	18	0.78%	254	10.95%	2,318
Nye	3,300	35.83%	3,979	43.20%	1,544	16.76%	150	1.63%	56	0.61%	182	1.98%	-679	-7.37%	9,211
Pershing	565	36.01%	743	47.36%	203	12.94%	28	1.78%	15	0.96%	15	0.96%	-178	-11.35%	1,569
Storey	614	37.10%	705	42.60%	244	14.74%	30	1.81%	37	2.24%	25	1.51%	-91	-5.50%	1,655
Washoe	44,915	41.11%	49,477	45.28%	9,970	9.12%	1,518	1.39%	1,838	1.68%	1,548	1.42%	-4,562	-4.17%	109,266
White Pine	1,397	39.97%	1,399	40.03%	546	15.62%	66	1.89%	29	0.83%	58	1.66%	-2	-0.06%	3,495
Totals	203,974	43.93%	199,244	42.91%	43,986	9.47%	5,608	1.21%	4,730	1.02%	6,737	1.45%	4,730	1.02%	464,279

==== Counties that flipped from Democratic to Republican ====
- White Pine

==== Counties that flipped from Independent to Republican ====
- Storey

==== Counties that flipped from Republican to Democratic ====
- Mineral

== See also ==
- United States presidential elections in Nevada
