= Montgomery Pass, Nevada =

Montgomery Pass
- Location within Nevada
- Elevation: 2,179 metres (7,149 ft)

Third Approach
- Coordinates: 37°58′25″N 118°19′36″W

Montgomery Pass is a ghost town and mountain pass which carries U.S. Route 6 over the White Mountains in Mineral County, Nevada. The pass is north of Montgomery Peak, near the Nevada/California border in Inyo National Forest.

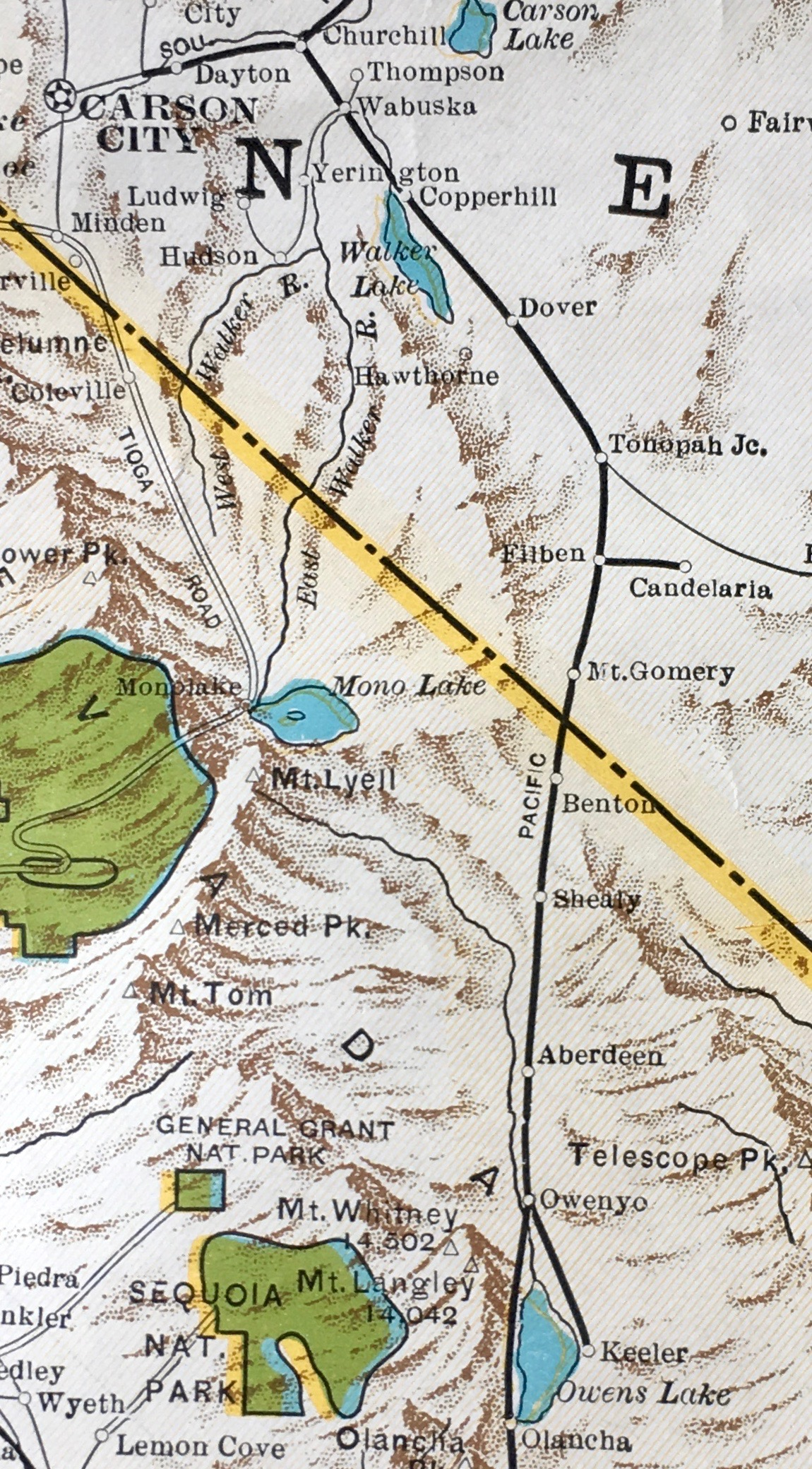
Carson and Colorado Railroad route as of 1931, showing Mt. Gomery

The populated place at the near the pass is also known as Mount Montgomery, Mt. Gomery and Summit. Mt. Gomery was a station on the Carson and Colorado Railway. In 1940, Montgomery had a service station, a store and a bar.

The nearest incorporated city is Bishop, California, other towns nearby include Benton, California and Tonopah, Nevada.

There was a small casino near Montgomery Pass, but it burned down sometime before 2011.
