= Owenyo, California =

Unincorporated community in California, United States

Owenyo
- Unincorporated community
- Location in California Owenyo (the United States)
- Coordinates: 36°40′42″N 118°02′39″W
- Country: United States
- State: California
- County: Inyo
- Elevation: 3,698 ft (1,127 m)

Owenyo (formerly New Owenyo) was an unincorporated community in Inyo County, California, United States. It was located on the Southern Pacific Railroad, 5 miles (8 km) north of Lone Pine, at an elevation of 3697 feet (1127 m). The town was abandoned in the 1960s, and all that remain now are a few traces of building foundations. There are no standing structures and no inhabitants in or anywhere near Owenyo, which remains on 21st century maps only as a reference point along the bleak, unkept and itself abandoned Owenyo-Lone Pine Road which runs about two miles east of, and parallel with, Federal Highway 395.

Owenyo's original townsite was one-half mile (0.8 km) to the southeast on the Carson and Colorado Railroad. The town, whose name is a portmanteau of Owens and Inyo, was originally started by Quaker colonists in 1900. They sold out in 1905, when the Carson and Colorado Railroad arrived, establishing the town as a transfer point for freight to be carried by the narrow-gauge railway which began there, serving points southward. A post office operated at Owenyo from 1902 to 1905 and from 1916 to 1941. The town moved to its present location in 1910, and for a while was known as New Owenyo on that account.
