= James E. Casey =

American businessman (1888–1983)

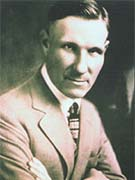
- Born: March 29, 1888; Pickhandle Gulch, Nevada, U.S.
- Died: June 6, 1983 (aged 95); Seattle, Washington, U.S.
- Occupations: Founder; American Messenger Company in Seattle, Washington, the predecessor to UPS

James E. Casey (March 29, 1888 – June 6, 1983) was an American businessman, known for being the founder of the American Messenger Company, today known as UPS.

In 1907, 19-year-old James Casey founded the American Messenger Company in Seattle, Washington. He served as president, CEO and chairman. Claude Ryan was his partner and his messengers were his brother George and other teenagers. His motto was "best service and lowest rates". Deliveries were made on foot, bicycle, or motorcycle.

He died on June 6, 1983, in a hospital-nursing home in Seattle.

== Background ==
Casey was born in Pickhandle Gulch near Candelaria, Nevada, the son of Irish immigrants. The family followed his grandfather to Candelaria but after the town's boom went bust, his father, Henry James Casey, moved the family to Seattle. He consistently gave credit to his mother, Annie E. Casey, for holding their family together after Jim's father died due to pulmonary disease. As a youngster delivering packages on the Seattle streets, Jim Casey was exposed to the excesses of a bustling city in the midst of the Klondike Gold Rush. He credited the guidance of a strong mother and support of his family with keeping him grounded.

On August 28, 1907, Casey founded the American Messenger Company with Claude Ryan in Seattle, Washington, capitalized with $100 in debt. An account described that the pair, to gain competitive advantage over nine competing messenger companies, pasted white placards all over town to advertise their services. The charged anywhere from 5 cents per message, depending on the distance, and a 25-cents hourly rate. Most deliveries at this time were made on foot and bicycles were used for longer trips. It is said that the one of the early innovations of the company was the consolidation of packages. The idea was that, instead of having each department store run their own fleet, the company offered a cheaper and more efficient service by consolidating the deliveries of four to five different stores.

In 1913, the American Messenger Company agreed to merge with Evert McCabe's Motorcycle Messengers. Merchants Parcel Delivery was formed and focused now on packages. Their first delivery car was a 1913 Ford Model T.

In 1919, the company expanded beyond Seattle and changed its name to United Parcel Service (UPS).

The successful businessman sought ways to help those who lacked the family life he found to be so crucial. With his brothers George and Harry and his sister Marguerite, Mr. Casey created Casey Family Programs in 1966 to help children who were unable to live with their birth parents—giving them stability and an opportunity to grow to responsible adulthood.

By the time of his death, Mr. Casey left three legacies: UPS, the Annie E. Casey Foundation, and Casey Family Programs.

Casey was posthumously inducted into the U.S. Department of Labor Hall of Fame (in 2002) and the Logistics Hall of Fame (in 2016).
