= Hammil Valley, California =

Unincorporated community in California, United States

Hammil Valley Hammil
- Unincorporated community
- Location in California Hammil Valley (the United States)
- Coordinates: 37°40′43″N 118°24′13″W
- Country: United States
- State: California
- County: Mono
- Established: 1870
- Elevation: 4,593 ft (1,400 m)

Population
  - Estimate (2000): 102
- GNIS feature ID: 261054

Hammil Valley is an unincorporated community in Mono County, California, United States. It is located 9 miles (14 km) west-northwest of White Mountain Peak.

The Hammil brothers (William, Hugh, and Robert) homesteaded at the site in 1870. The Carson and Colorado Railroad built a train station in 1883 and named it after the brothers. The area's postal service was handled by the Mocalno, which operated from 1915 to 1937. Mocalno was named by adding "cal" for California in the Mono (the county's name).

Today, most of the residents of Hammil Valley go to school or work in Bishop.
