= 1960 United States presidential election in Nevada =

- November 8, 1960

Nominee	John F. Kennedy	Richard Nixon
Party	Democratic	Republican
Home state	Massachusetts	California
Running mate	Lyndon B. Johnson	Henry Cabot Lodge Jr.
Electoral vote	3	0
Popular vote	54,880	52,387
Percentage	51.16%	48.84%
County results
Kennedy
50–60%
60–70%
Nixon
50–60%
60–70%
President before election
Dwight D. Eisenhower
Republican
Elected President
John F. Kennedy
Democratic

The 1960 United States presidential election in Nevada took place on November 8, 1960, as part of the 1960 United States presidential election. State voters chose three representatives, or electors, to the Electoral College, who voted for president and vice president. All surrounding states (California, Arizona, Utah, Idaho, and Oregon) voted for Nixon.

Nevada was won by Senator John F. Kennedy (D–Massachusetts), running with Senator Lyndon B. Johnson, with 51.16% of the popular vote against incumbent Vice President Richard Nixon (R–California), running with United States Ambassador to the United Nations Henry Cabot Lodge Jr., with 48.84% of the popular vote.

Although Nixon lost the state and the election, he would later win Nevada in both 1968 and 1972.

== Results ==
1960 United States presidential election in Nevada
Party	Candidate	Votes	%
Democratic	John F. Kennedy	54,880	51.16%
Republican	Richard Nixon	52,387	48.84%
Total votes		107,267	100%

=== Results by county ===
County	John F. Kennedy Democratic		Richard Nixon Republican		Margin		Total votes cast
County	#	%	#	%	#	%	Total votes cast
Churchill	1,309	42.58%	1,765	57.42%	-456	-14.84%	3,074
Clark	23,949	56.82%	18,197	43.18%	5,752	13.64%	42,146
Douglas	587	33.52%	1,164	66.48%	-577	-32.96%	1,751
Elko	2,495	50.69%	2,427	49.31%	68	1.38%	4,922
Esmeralda	215	57.95%	156	42.05%	59	15.90%	371
Eureka	223	48.27%	239	51.73%	-16	-3.46%	462
Humboldt	1,173	50.34%	1,157	49.66%	16	0.68%	2,330
Lander	391	50.52%	383	49.48%	8	1.04%	774
Lincoln	771	59.26%	530	40.74%	241	18.52%	1,301
Lyon	1,009	40.31%	1,494	59.69%	-485	-19.38%	2,503
Mineral	1,606	63.33%	930	36.67%	676	26.66%	2,536
Nye	993	56.55%	763	43.45%	230	13.10%	1,756
Ormsby	1,283	39.73%	1,946	60.27%	-663	-20.54%	3,229
Pershing	716	52.49%	648	47.51%	68	4.98%	1,364
Storey	167	45.14%	203	54.86%	-36	-9.72%	370
Washoe	15,280	44.79%	18,833	55.21%	-3,553	-10.42%	34,113
White Pine	2,713	63.61%	1,552	36.39%	1,161	27.22%	4,265
Totals	54,880	51.16%	52,387	48.84%	2,493	2.32%	107,267

==== Counties that flipped from Republican to Democratic ====
- Elko
- Esmeralda
- Humboldt
- Lander
- Lincoln
- Mineral
- Nye
- Pershing
- White Pine

== See also ==
- United States presidential elections in Nevada
