= Casey Family Programs =

American charitable organization

Coordinates: 47.615707°N 122.336815°W

- Named after: James E. Casey
- Formation: 1966
- Type: Private operating foundation
- Headquarters: Seattle, Washington
- Location: United States
- President and CEO: William C. Bell, PhD
- Budget: $127 million
- Website: www.casey.org

Casey Family Programs (CFP) is a national operating foundation focused on foster care and child welfare.

Based in Seattle, Washington, Casey Family Programs works in 50 states, District of Columbia, and Puerto Rico. It has offices in Arizona, California, Colorado, District of Columbia, Georgia, Idaho, New York, Texas, and Washington.

The foundation, established by United Parcel Service founder James E. Casey in 1966, has a stated mission to provide and improve—and ultimately prevent the need for—foster care in the United States.

== Work ==
Casey Family Programs works primarily in three areas:

- Consulting: technical assistance, data analysis, independent research and strategic consultation provided to child welfare systems, policymakers, courts and tribes in the United States.
- Direct services: foster care and other direct services provided to approximately 1,100 children and families through community-based offices in nine locations.
- Public policy: child welfare data and other information provided to federal, state, tribal and local governments.

Casey Family Programs has developed a number of tools used by child welfare agencies, including the Ansell Casey Life Skills Assessment.

== History ==
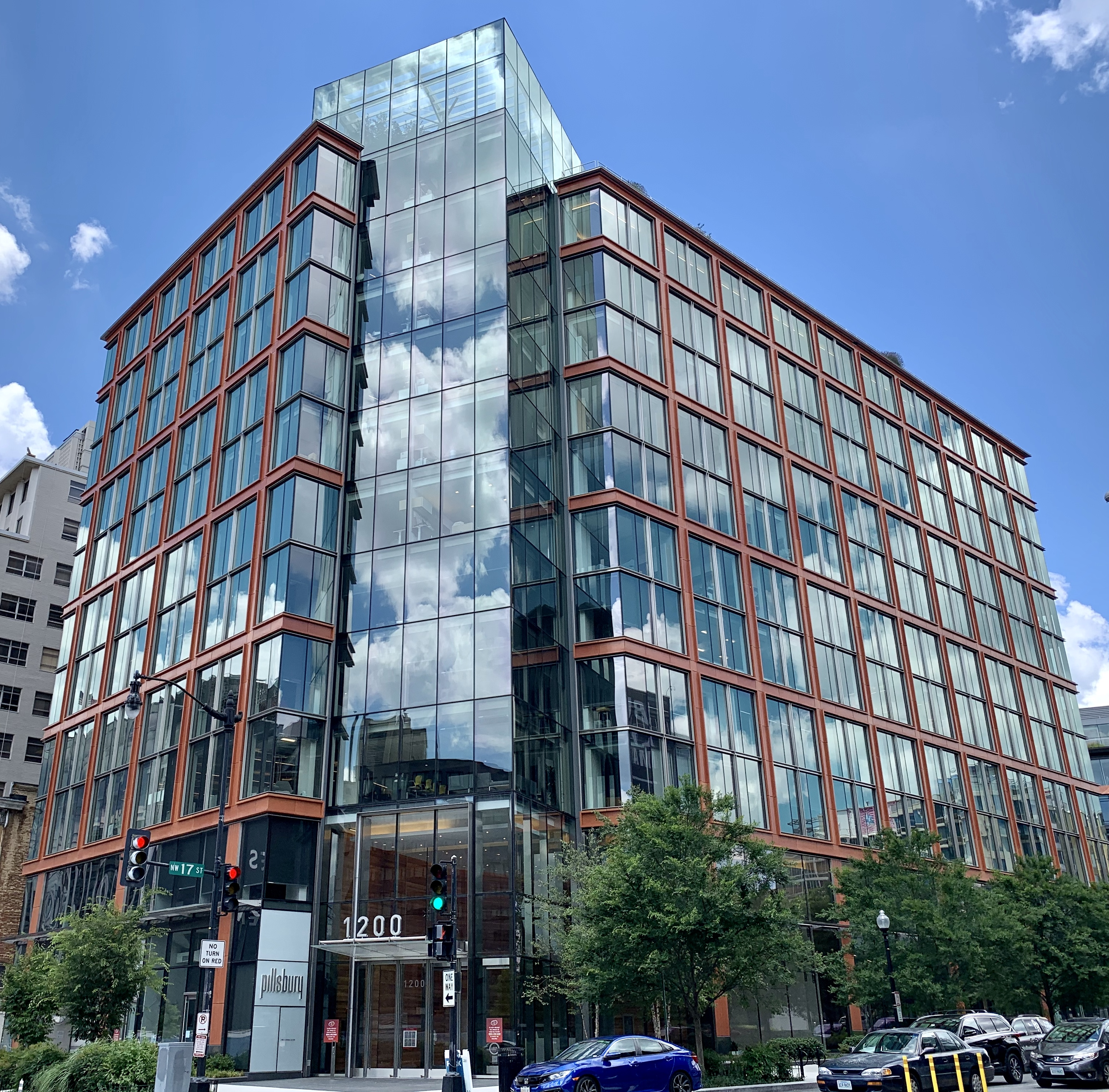
Casey Family Program's policy office in downtown Washington, D.C.

In 1966, the Casey family philanthropy, acting through their Annie E. Casey Foundation (AECF), started a child welfare agency (foster care and related services) in the Seattle, Washington, area. When Jim Casey's company, United Parcel Service (UPS), moved its headquarters from Seattle to New York City in 1973, he gave the Seattle child welfare agency enough funds to become officially a separate, independent entity from the AECF. That organization is known today as "Casey Family Programs."

Casey Family Programs has evolved over time, broadening its role from traditional foster care to "reach more children and have more of a national impact." By 2015, Casey Family Programs claimed to be working in all 50 states, the District of Columbia and Puerto Rico.

== Related organizations ==
In 1976, Jim Casey started similar programs on the east coast, creating Casey Family Services, based in Connecticut and serving the New England states until 2012.

In 2001, Casey Family Programs founded the Marguerite Casey Foundation to help low-income families. Casey Family Programs is also the founding member of Foster Care Alumni of America.
