= Wabuska, Nevada =

Unincorporated community in Nevada, US

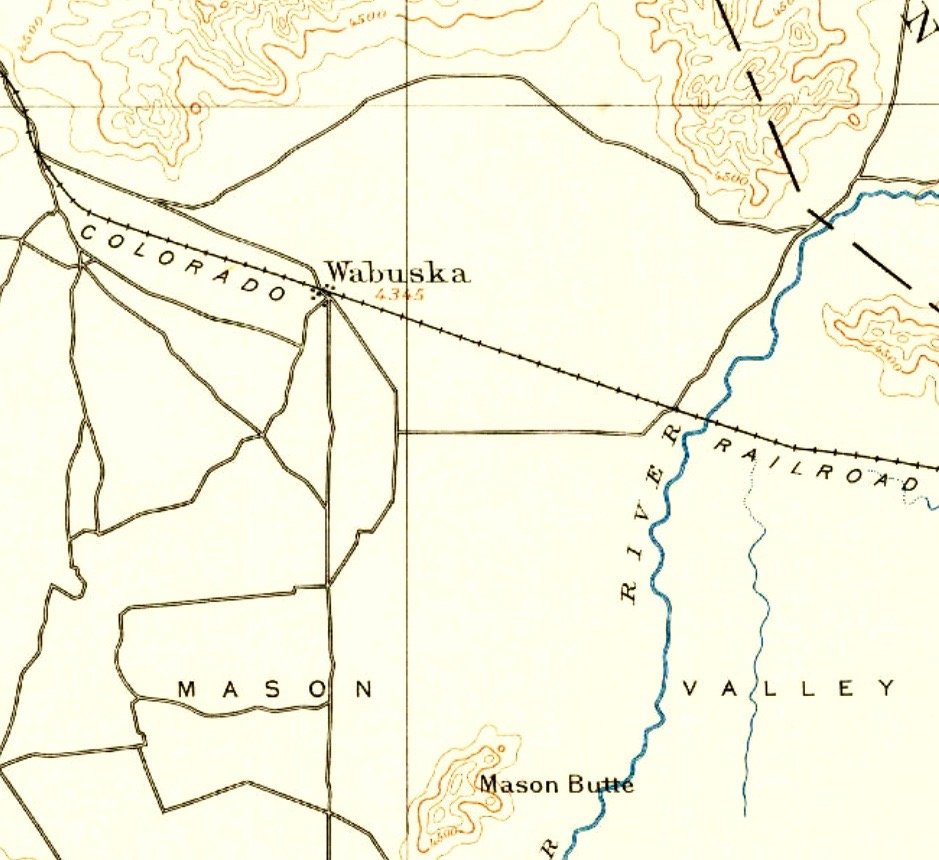
- Wabuska site in 1894

- Location within Nevada
- Coordinates: 39°08′38″N 119°11′00″W
- Elevation: 1,309 m (4,295 ft)
- Postal code: 89447

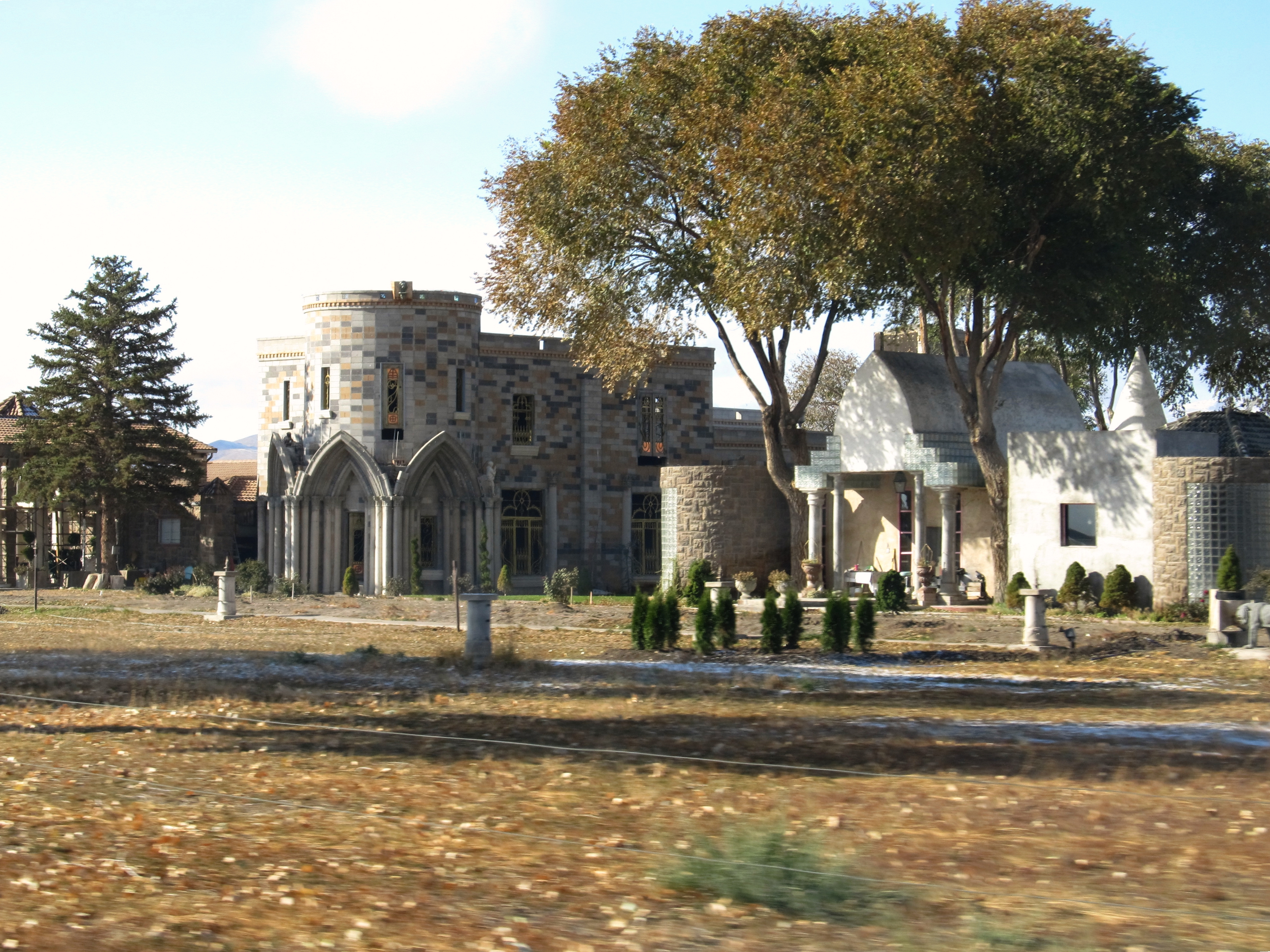
Home in Wabuska

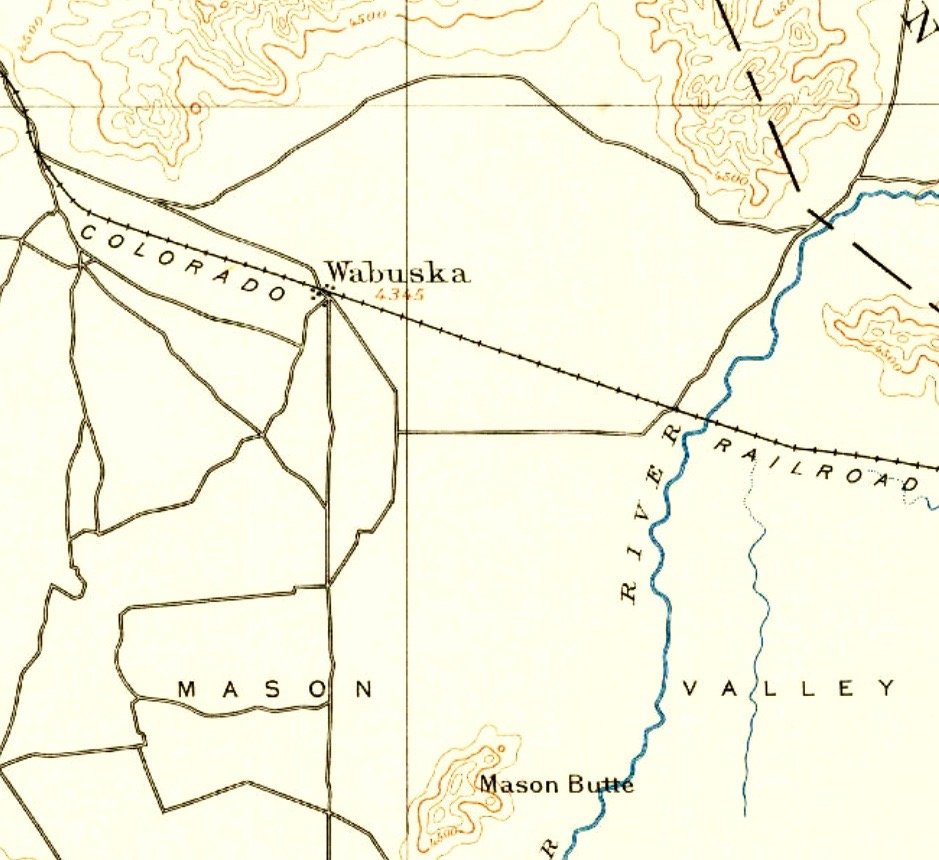
Wabuska site in 1894

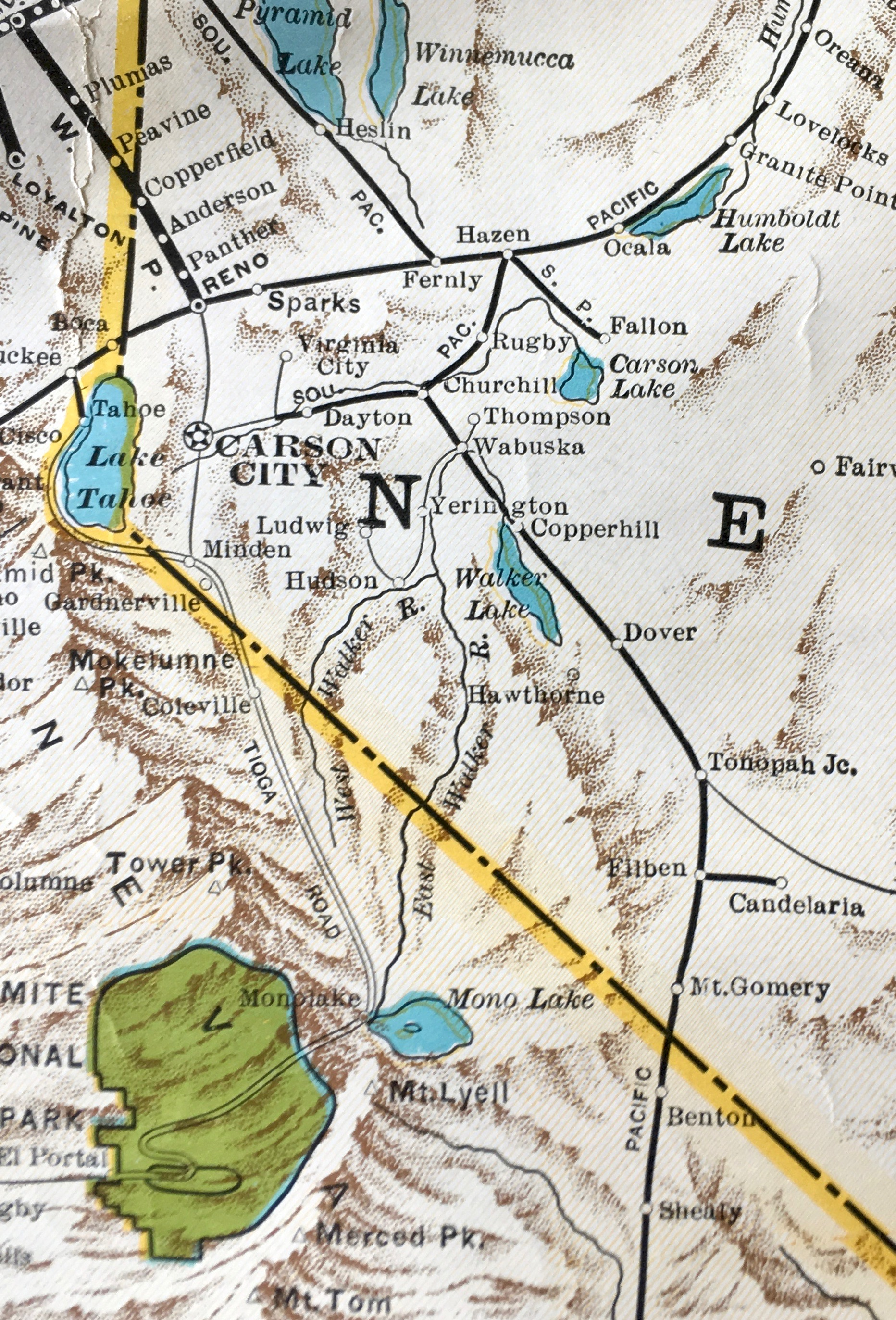
Rail connections in the area in 1931

Wabuska is an unincorporated community in Lyon County, Nevada, United States. The zip code is 89447, which it shares with nearby Yerington.

Wabuska (Washo language, White Grass) was established in the early 1870s. A post office was opened on September 18, 1874. In 1881, the town served as the principal Mason Valley supply center on the newly constructed Carson and Colorado Railroad of a line that went from Hazen to Mina. When copper was discovered in Mason Valley, the town became the northern terminus of the new Nevada Copper Belt Railroad, built 1909–1911. Wabuska waned with declining mining activity in the 1920s.

Several buildings from Wabuska, most notably the Wabuska Railroad Station, were relocated to Carson City and incorporated as the Nevada State Railroad Museum.

== Geography ==
Wabuska's latitude is 39.143N and the longitude is -119.182W. Wabuska's elevation is 4,295 feet above sea level.

=== Climate ===
Wabuska experiences a desert climate and has a Köppen Climate Classification of Bwk.

Climate data for Wabuska, Nevada
Month	Jan	Feb	Mar	Apr	May	Jun	Jul	Aug	Sep	Oct	Nov	Dec	Year
Mean daily maximum °C (°F)	8 (46)	11 (52)	16 (60)	19 (66)	24 (75)	29 (85)	34 (94)	33 (92)	28 (83)	21 (70)	13 (56)	8 (46)	21 (69)
Mean daily minimum °C (°F)	−9 (16)	−7 (20)	−3 (26)	−1 (31)	4 (39)	8 (46)	11 (52)	9 (49)	4 (40)	−1 (30)	−6 (22)	−9 (15)	0 (32)
Average precipitation mm (inches)	13 (0.5)	13 (0.5)	13 (0.5)	10 (0.4)	15 (0.6)	10 (0.4)	5.1 (0.2)	5.1 (0.2)	7.6 (0.3)	10 (0.4)	10 (0.4)	10 (0.4)	120 (4.7)
Source: Weatherbase
