= Omco, Nevada =

- Ghost town
- Location within Nevada Location within the United States
- Coordinates: 38°36′29″N 117°53′35″W
- Country: United States
- State: Nevada
- County: Mineral
- Named for: The Olympic Mines Company
- Elevation: 5,965 ft (1,818 m)

Omco is an extinct town in Mineral County, in the U.S. state of Nevada. The GNIS classifies it as a populated place.

The community's name is derived from the Olympic Mines Company.

== History ==
In 1915, gold was discovered in the area and the Olympic Mine established. A post office was established at Omco in 1917, and remained in operation until 1921. In 1917, the Olympic Mines Company was incorporated, a cyanide plant with capacity of 70 tons was built. The mill burned in 1919 and was rebuilt in 1920. The mill shut down in 1921 after the ore was depleted. Total production was US$700,000 (equivalent to $12,600,000 in 2025). On December 20, 1932, the shaft collapsed during an earthquake (See Cedar Mountains (Nevada)). In 1936, the property was in the process of being rehabilitated.
