= Mineral County, Nevada =

County in Nevada, United States

- County
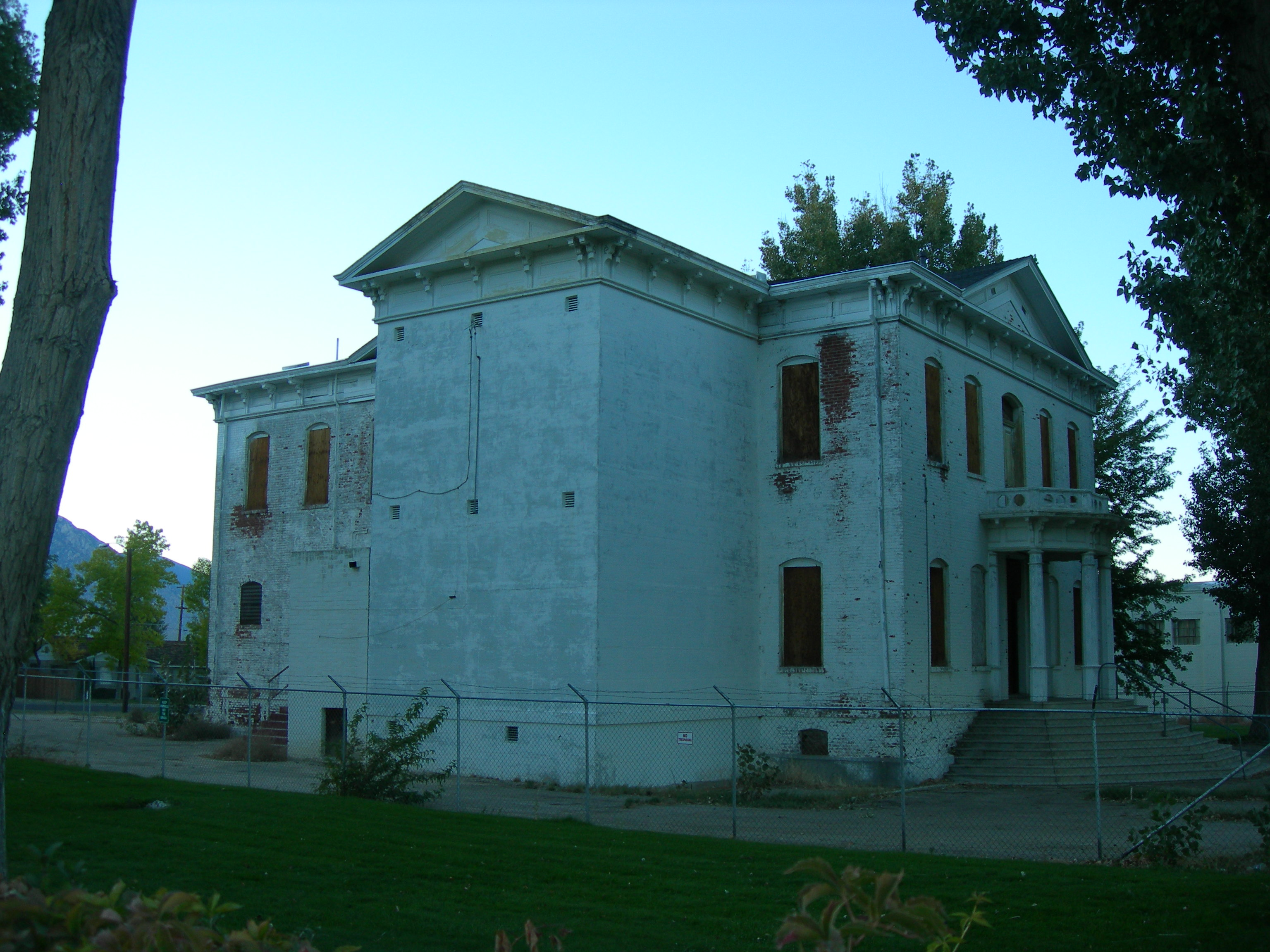
- Historic 1883 Esmeralda County and Mineral County Courthouse

- Flag Seal

- Location within the U.S. state of Nevada
- Coordinates: 38°32′N 118°26′W
- Country: United States
- State: Nevada
- Founded: 1911; 115 years ago
- Named for: Mineral
- Seat: Hawthorne
- Largest community: Hawthorne

Area
  - Total: 3,813 sq mi (9,880 km^{2})
  - Land: 3,753 sq mi (9,720 km^{2})
  - Water: 60 sq mi (160 km^{2}) 1.6%

Population (2020)
  - Total: 4,554
  - Estimate (2025): 4,407 ▼
  - Density: 1.213/sq mi (0.4685/km^{2})
- Time zone: UTC−8 (Pacific)
  - Summer (DST): UTC−7 (PDT)
- Congressional district: 4th
- Website: mineralcountynv.us

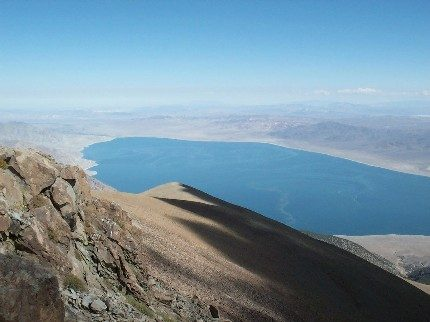
Walker Lake Recreation Area, a popular scenic attraction

Mineral County is a county located in the U.S. state of Nevada. As of the 2020 census, the population was 4,554, making it the fifth-least populous county in Nevada. Its county seat is Hawthorne.

== History ==
Mineral County was carved out of Esmeralda County in 1911 shortly after the county seat of Esmeralda was moved to Goldfield in 1907. Its name came from the surrounding area, which is heavily mineralized. Hawthorne has always been its county seat. The county is listed as Nevada Historical Marker 16. The marker is located on U.S. Highway 95 at Walker Lake.

== Geography ==
According to the U.S. Census Bureau, the county has a total area of 3,813 square miles (9,880 km^{2}), of which 3,753 square miles (9,720 km^{2}) is land and 60 square miles (160 km^{2}) (1.6%) is water. The highest point in Mineral County is Mount Grant at 11,285 ft (3,440 m).

=== Major highways ===
- Interstate 11 (Future)
- U.S. Route 6
- U.S. Route 95
- U.S. Route 95 Alternate
- U.S. Route 95 Truck (Hawthorne)
- State Route 359
- State Route 360
- State Route 361

=== Adjacent counties ===
- Lyon County - northwest
- Churchill County - north
- Nye County - northeast
- Esmeralda County - southeast
- Mono County, California - southwest

=== National protected areas ===
- Inyo National Forest (part)
- Toiyabe National Forest (part)

== Demographics ==
Historical population
Census	Pop.	Note	%±
1920	1,848		—
1930	1,863		0.8%
1940	2,342		25.7%
1950	5,560		137.4%
1960	6,329		13.8%
1970	7,051		11.4%
1980	6,217		−11.8%
1990	6,475		4.1%
2000	5,071		−21.7%
2010	4,772		−5.9%
2020	4,554		−4.6%
2025 (est.)	4,407	▼	−3.2%
U.S. Decennial Census; 1790-1960 1900-1990; 1990-2000 2010-2020

=== Racial and ethnic composition ===
Mineral County, Nevada – Racial and ethnic composition Note: the US Census treats Hispanic/Latino as an ethnic category. This table excludes Latinos from the racial categories and assigns them to a separate category. Hispanics/Latinos may be of any race.
Race / Ethnicity (NH = Non-Hispanic)	Pop 1980	Pop 1990	Pop 2000	Pop 2010	Pop 2020	% 1980	% 1990	% 2000	% 2010	% 2020
White alone (NH)	4,687	4,871	3,555	3,271	2,858	75.39%	75.23%	70.10%	68.55%	62.76%
Black or African American alone (NH)	382	343	235	182	161	6.14%	5.30%	4.63%	3.81%	3.54%
Native American or Alaska Native alone (NH)	588	645	713	666	711	9.46%	9.96%	14.06%	13.96%	15.61%
Asian alone (NH)	57	66	38	49	64	0.92%	1.02%	0.75%	1.03%	1.41%
Native Hawaiian or Pacific Islander alone (NH)	x	x	4	6	8	x	x	0.08%	0.13%	0.18%
Other race alone (NH)	0	4	6	2	16	0.00%	0.06%	0.12%	0.04%	0.35%
Mixed race or Multiracial (NH)	x	x	92	160	228	x	x	1.81%	3.35%	5.01%
Hispanic or Latino (any race)	503	546	428	436	508	8.09%	8.43%	8.44%	9.14%	11.16%
Total	6,217	6,475	5,071	4,772	4,554	100.00%	100.00%	100.00%	100.00%	100.00%

=== 2020 census ===
As of the 2020 census, the county had a population of 4,554. The median age was 47.3 years. 20.3% of residents were under the age of 18 and 25.4% of residents were 65 years of age or older. For every 100 females there were 100.6 males, and for every 100 females age 18 and over there were 98.5 males age 18 and over.

0.0% of residents lived in urban areas, while 100.0% lived in rural areas.

The racial makeup of the county was 65.9% White, 3.6% Black or African American, 17.2% American Indian and Alaska Native, 1.4% Asian, 0.2% Native Hawaiian and Pacific Islander, 3.7% from some other race, and 7.9% from two or more races. Hispanic or Latino residents of any race comprised 11.2% of the population.

There were 2,102 households in the county, of which 25.4% had children under the age of 18 living with them and 29.8% had a female householder with no spouse or partner present. About 36.7% of all households were made up of individuals and 17.3% had someone living alone who was 65 years of age or older.

There were 2,586 housing units, of which 18.7% were vacant. Among occupied housing units, 65.8% were owner-occupied and 34.2% were renter-occupied. The homeowner vacancy rate was 2.6% and the rental vacancy rate was 10.1%.

=== 2010 census ===
At the 2010 census, there were 4,772 people, 2,240 households, and 1,258 families living in the county. The population density was 1.3 inhabitants per square mile (0.50/km^{2}). There were 2,830 housing units at an average density of 0.8 per square mile (0.31/km^{2}). The racial makeup of the county was 72.5% white, 15.5% Native American, 4.1% black or African American, 1.1% Asian, 0.1% Pacific islander, 2.1% from other races, and 4.4% from two or more races. Those of Hispanic or Latino origin made up 9.1% of the population. In terms of ancestry, 23.8% were English, 18.5% were German, 13.8% were Irish, 9.3% were Scottish, 5.2% were Portuguese, and 3.7% were American.

Of the 2,240 households, 21.2% had children under the age of 18 living with them, 39.0% were married couples living together, 11.2% had a female householder with no husband present, 43.8% were non-families, and 36.7% of households were made up of individuals. The average household size was 2.11 and the average family size was 2.70. The median age was 49.2 years.

The median household income was $35,446 and the median family income was $57,064. Males had a median income of $48,281 versus $33,830 for females. The per capita income for the county was $23,226. About 11.4% of families and 19.1% of the population were below the poverty line, including 11.0% of those under age 18 and 12.6% of those age 65 or over.

=== 2000 census ===
At the 2000 census there were 5,071 people, 2,197 households, and 1,379 families living in the county. The population density was 1 person per square mile (0.39 person/km^{2}). There were 2,866 housing units at an average density of 1 units per square mile (0.39/km^{2}). The racial makeup of the county was 73.9% White, 4.8% Black or African American, 15.5% Native American, 0.8% Asian, 0.1% Pacific Islander, 2.7% from other races, and 2.4% from two or more races. 8.44% of the population were Hispanic or Latino of any race. Of the 2,197 households 25.40% had children under the age of 18 living with them, 45.20% were married couples living together, 11.50% had a female householder with no husband present, and 37.20% were non-families. 31.60% of households were one person and 15.10% were one person aged 65 or older. The average household size was 2.26 and the average family size was 2.78.

The age distribution was 24.40% under the age of 18, 6.20% from 18 to 24, 22.50% from 25 to 44, 27.10% from 45 to 64, and 19.80% 65 or older. The median age was 43 years. For every 100 females, there were 101.60 males. For every 100 females age 18 and over, there were 98.30 males.

The median household income was $32,891 and the median family income was $39,477. Males had a median income of $31,929 versus $25,262 for females. The per capita income for the county was $16,952. About 11.00% of families and 15.20% of the population were below the poverty line, including 17.70% of those under age 18 and 10.70% of those age 65 or over.

== Communities ==
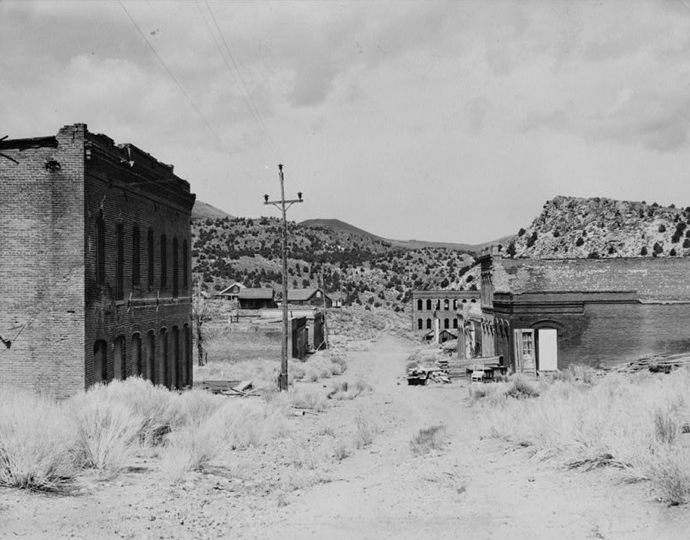
Main Street, Aurora, Nevada 1934

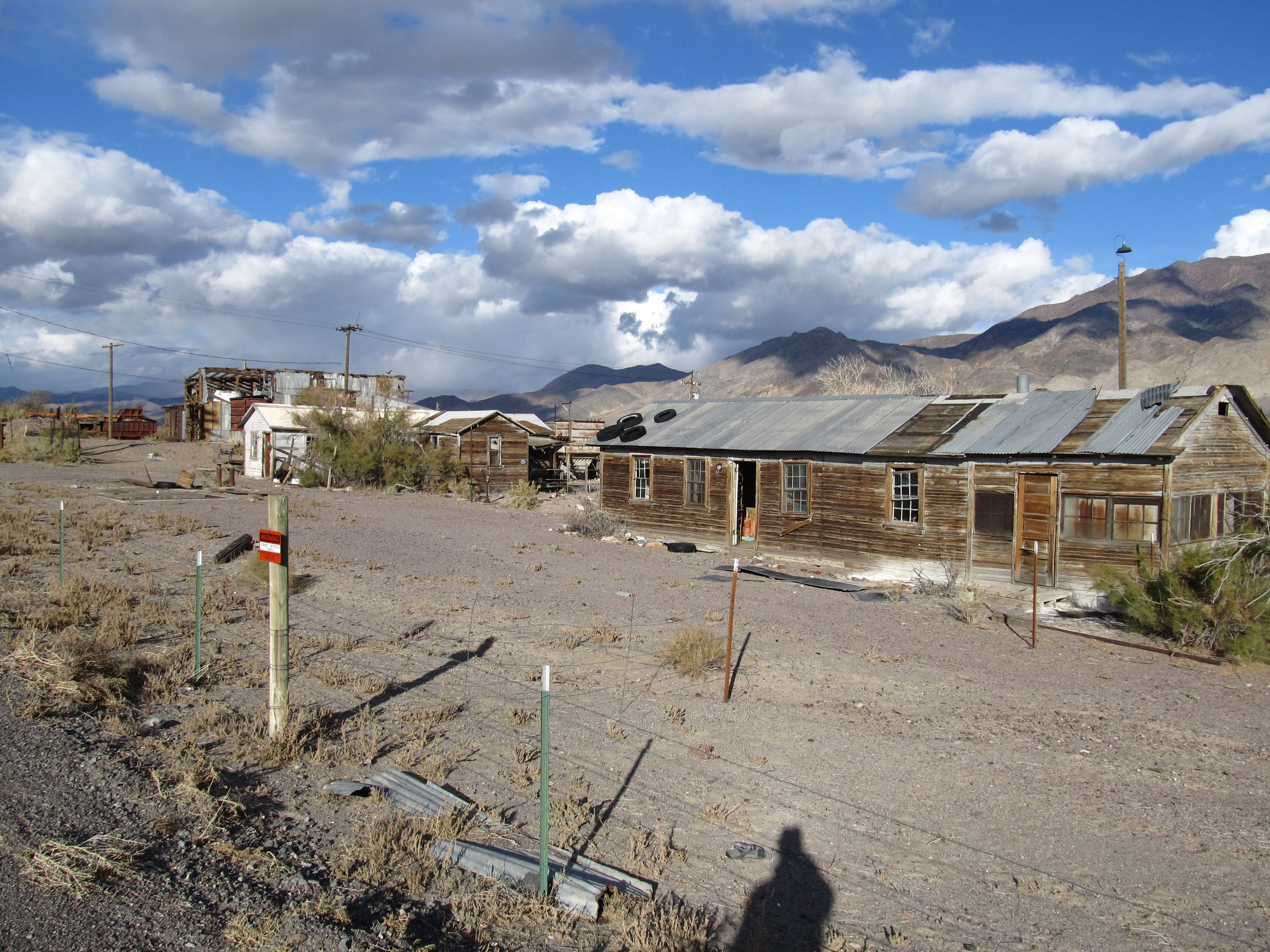
Sodaville, a ghost town near Mina, 2011

There are no incorporated communities in Mineral County.

=== Census-designated places ===
- Hawthorne (county seat)
- Mina
- Schurz
- Walker Lake

=== Unincorporated communities ===
- Luning

=== Other places ===
- Aurora
- Babbitt
- Basalt
- Belleville
- Broken Hills
- Candelaria
- Eagleville
- Kinkaid
- Lucky Boy
- Marietta
- Montgomery Pass
- Omco
- Rand
- Rawhide
- Rhodes
- Sodaville
- Thorne

== Politics ==
For much of the 20th century, Mineral County leaned Democratic and only voted Republican in national landslides. During the Reagan era, the county flipped decisively into the Republican column. The only Democrat to carry the county after 1976 was Bill Clinton in 1996, mostly as a result of high third-party performance. However, Barack Obama came within just over two percentage points of winning it in his 2008 landslide in the state. Since this year, the county's Republican tilt has increased in every election.

United States presidential election results for Mineral County, Nevada
Year	Republican		Democratic		Third party(ies)	
Year	No.	%	No.	%	No.	%
1912	59	10.63%	219	39.46%	277	49.91%
1916	385	34.75%	617	55.69%	106	9.57%
1920	374	59.46%	209	33.23%	46	7.31%
1924	191	37.90%	84	16.67%	229	45.44%
1928	275	45.76%	326	54.24%	0	0.00%
1932	238	26.89%	647	73.11%	0	0.00%
1936	236	23.27%	778	76.73%	0	0.00%
1940	406	36.94%	693	63.06%	0	0.00%
1944	751	35.85%	1,344	64.15%	0	0.00%
1948	706	36.62%	1,194	61.93%	28	1.45%
1952	1,297	48.65%	1,369	51.35%	0	0.00%
1956	1,433	50.32%	1,415	49.68%	0	0.00%
1960	930	36.67%	1,606	63.33%	0	0.00%
1964	927	39.16%	1,440	60.84%	0	0.00%
1968	927	32.31%	1,242	43.29%	700	24.40%
1972	2,111	73.32%	768	26.68%	0	0.00%
1976	1,104	42.56%	1,361	52.47%	129	4.97%
1980	1,628	63.94%	631	24.78%	287	11.27%
1984	1,645	65.69%	766	30.59%	93	3.71%
1988	1,480	56.88%	978	37.59%	144	5.53%
1992	918	34.76%	909	34.42%	814	30.82%
1996	814	35.12%	1,068	46.07%	436	18.81%
2000	1,227	53.51%	916	39.95%	150	6.54%
2004	1,336	57.41%	931	40.01%	60	2.58%
2008	1,131	49.02%	1,082	46.90%	94	4.07%
2012	1,080	53.07%	863	42.41%	92	4.52%
2016	1,179	59.04%	637	31.90%	181	9.06%
2020	1,423	60.94%	829	35.50%	83	3.55%
2024	1,528	66.58%	711	30.98%	56	2.44%

United States Senate election results for Mineral County, Nevada1
Year	Republican		Democratic		Third party(ies)	
Year	No.	%	No.	%	No.	%
2024	1,326	57.98%	737	32.23%	224	9.79%

== See also ==
- National Register of Historic Places listings in Mineral County, Nevada
