= Dolomite, California =

Unincorporated community in California, United States

Dolomite
- Unincorporated community
- Location in California Dolomite (the United States)
- Coordinates: 36°33′11″N 117°56′43″W
- Country: United States
- State: California
- County: Inyo
- Elevation: 3,670 ft (1,120 m)

Dolomite is an unincorporated community in Inyo County, California, United States. It is located on the Southern Pacific Railroad, 6.5 miles (10.5 km) south of New York Butte in the Owens Valley, at an elevation of 3674 feet (1120 m).

Originally, in 1883, a siding on the Carson and Colorado Railroad, the town developed in 1885, when the Inyo Marble Company opened a quarry at the site.

A number of Western films have been shot in Dolomite, including Sinister Journey (1948), From Hell to Texas (1958), Hell Bent for Leather (1960), An Eye For An Eye (1966), Nevada Smith (1966) and Waterhole No. 3 (1967).
