= Zurich, California =

Zurich
- Populated place
- Location in California
- Coordinates: 37°10′58″N 118°15′36″W
- Country: United States
- State: California
- County: Inyo
- Elevation: 3,934 ft (1,199 m)
- GNIS feature ID: 269403

Zurich (formerly Alvord and Station) is a former settlement in Inyo County, California, United States. It was a stop of the Carson and Colorado Railway. It is located 2 miles (3 km) northeast of Big Pine.

Zurich was established in 1884 as Alvord, but was renamed in 1923 as Zurich for the jagged peaks of the nearby White Mountains, since during the winter, the snow on the mountain peaks reminded a local Swiss resident of the Alps. The town was established as the first stop of the Carson and Colorado Railway which ran to Keeler. When the railroad declined in the 1940s, so did Zurich, and it was finally abandoned in 1960 when the railroad shut down. Several building foundations are all that remain of Zurich. An historical plaque dedicates the site of the former town.

== See also ==
- List of ghost towns in California
