= Kinkaid, Nevada =

- Ghost town
- Location within Nevada Location within the United States
- Country: United States
- State: Nevada
- County: Mineral
- Elevation: 4,409 ft (1,344 m)

Kinkaid is a populated place located in Mineral County. Kinkaid is also known as Kinkead and Kinkaid Siding. Kinkead was a stop on the Carson and Colorado Railway. Kinkead Mill, located in Kinkead, was in operation in the 1940s.

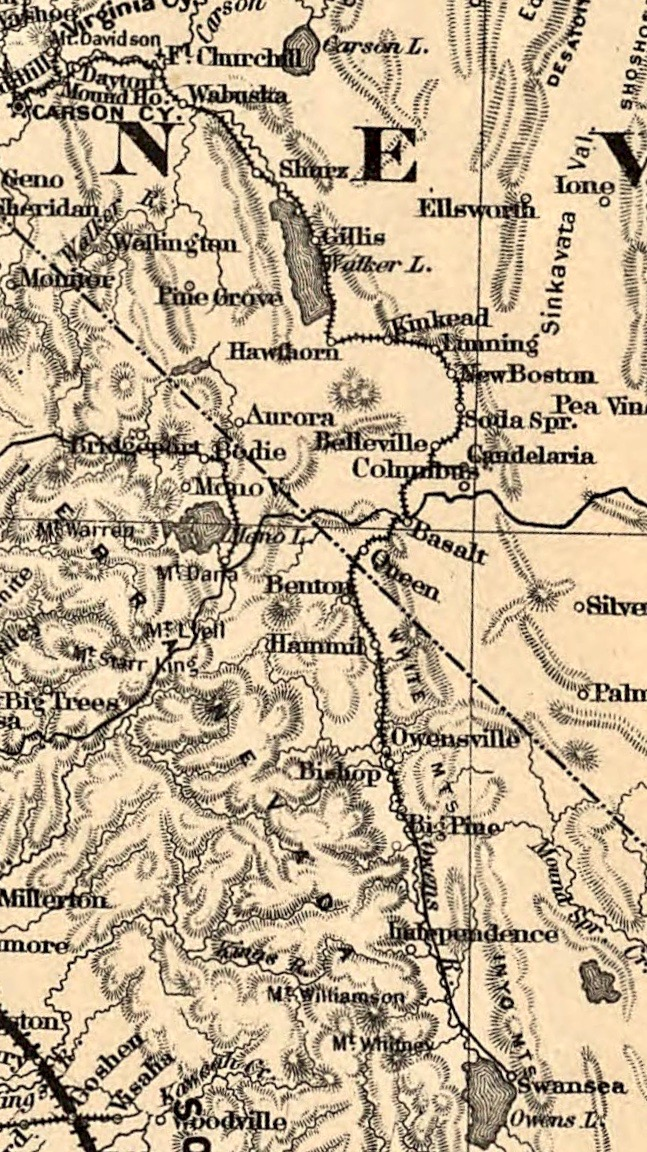
Carson and Colorado Railway route in 1883 showing Kinkead
