= Rhodes, Nevada =

- Ghost town
- Etymology: Named for A. J. Rhoades, who worked the nearby salt marsh
- Location within Nevada Location within the United States
- Coordinates: 38°16′42″N 118°05′49″W
- Country: United States
- State: Nevada
- County: Mineral
- Elevation: 4,357 ft (1,328 m)
- Time zone: UTC-8 (Pacific (PST))
  - Summer (DST): UTC-7 (PDT)

Rhodes, Nevada is a former rail station and Post Office on the Carson and Colorado Railway in Mineral County, Nevada.

== History ==
Until 1862, salt was transported from San Francisco to the Comstock Lode, Virginia City, Nevada at a cost of US$150 (equivalent to $4,838 in 2025)/ton. In 1862, salt was mined in nearby Rhodes Salt Marsh and transported using imported camels at half that cost. In 1863, salt was discovered at Sand Springs Marsh and found to be cheaper than salt from Rhodes Salt Marsh. In 1869, salt from Rhodes Salt Marsh was transported to Columbus, Nevada and Belmont, Nevada. In 1874 and in 1882, one ton per day of borax was being produced.

The Post Office was called Rhodes from October 1893 until October 1907 and then Dea from October 1907 until May 1908.

In 1930, a sodium sulfate plant was built at Rhodes Marsh. By November 1932, Rhodes Marsh was producing one train car load per day and employing about 100 men.

In about 1934, Germany started shipping sodium sulphate as ballast, which caused the price to drop, making mining at Rhodes Marsh unprofitable. In 1948, mining of sodium sulphate resumed, with the output going to a Florida paper manufacturer. At that time, all 30 of the employees were residents of Mina, Nevada.
