= Rand, Nevada =

- Ghost town
- Location within Nevada Location within the United States
- Country: United States
- State: Nevada
- County: Mineral
- Named for: R. J. Rand, a businessperson in the local mining industry
- Elevation: 4,163 ft (1,269 m)

Rand is an extinct town in Mineral County, in the U.S. state of Nevada. The GNIS classifies Rand as a populated place with a "RR Locale" description. Rand was a station on the Carson and Colorado Railway.

== History ==
A post office was established at Rand in 1915, and remained in operation until 1935. Rand was named for the Rand Mining District located about 16 miles east in the Gabbs Mountains (The Rand Mining District is a variant name of the Bovard Mining District.) The community was named after R. J. Randall, who had claims in the Rand Mining District.
