= Candelaria, Nevada =

- Ghost town
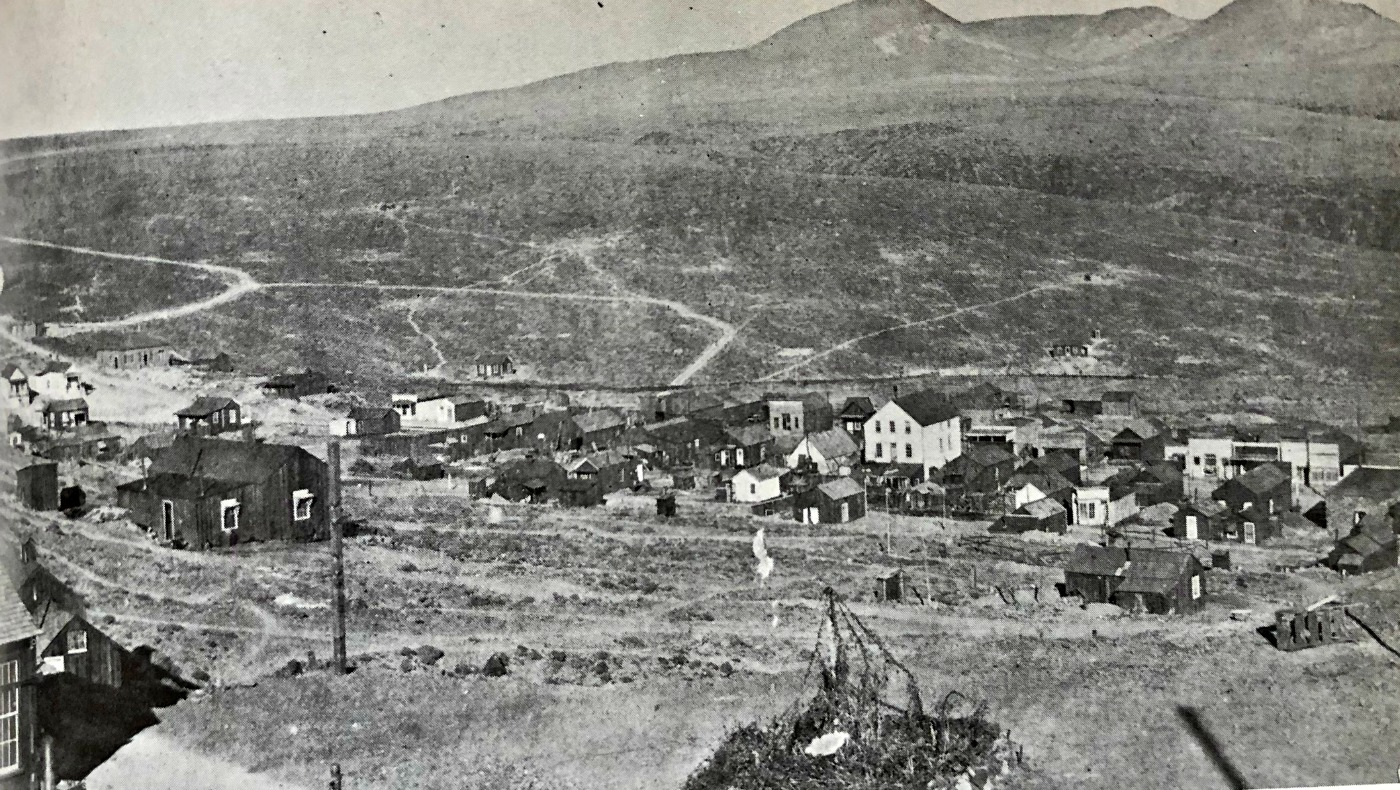

- Location within Nevada Location within the United States
- Coordinates: 38°09′32″N 118°05′21″W
- Country: United States
- State: Nevada
- County: Mineral
- Elevation: 5,715 ft (1,742 m)
- Time zone: UTC-8 (Pacific (PST))
  - Summer (DST): UTC-7 (PDT)

Nevada Historical Marker
- Official name: Candelaria and Metallic City
- Reference no.: 92

Candelaria is a ghost town in Mineral County, Nevada. Today the site of Candelaria is dominated by the Kinross Gold Candelaria Mine on Mt. Diablo.

== History ==
Candelaria was founded in 1864 when Mexican prospectors working in the area discovered silver deposits on the northern slopes of the mountain. In 1873, the camp's most profitable mine, the Northern Belle, went into production. The success of the mine attracted people and business to the area, and by 1875, the Candelaria district became the most productive in southwestern Nevada.

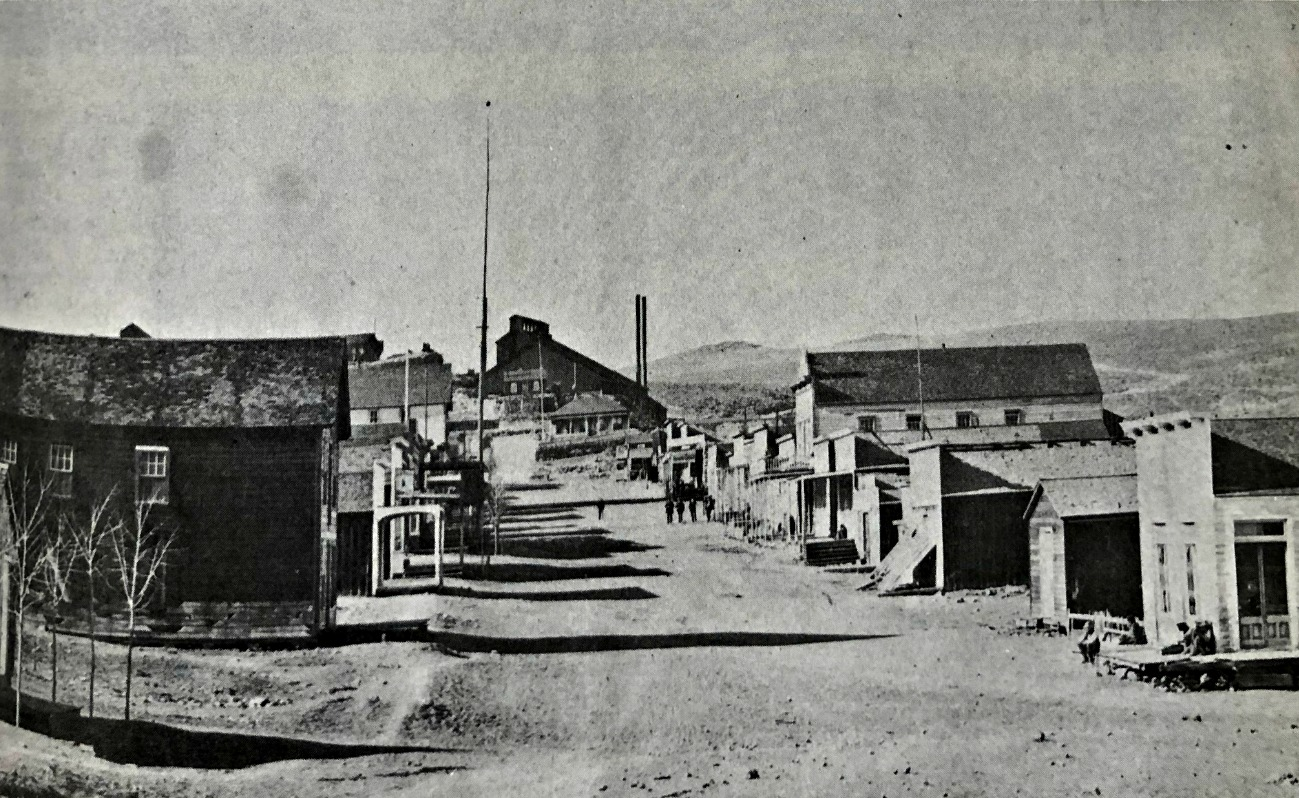
Candelaria main street, early 1880s

As the population grew, there was not enough water available to support mining and the populated settlement. "The stamp mill in Candelaria had to operate as a dry mill, which spread toxic dust throughout the area. Unlike other camps where a wet milling process was used, Candelaria miners suffered from an extremely high incidence of “miners consumption” (respiratory disease). Inhabitants of the area breathed in the fine particulate dust created by the dry stamping process, which brought about respiratory tract infections and diseases which often ended in death".

The Northern Belle produced and shipped approximately $15 million in silver. The town had two hotels, numerous stores, multiple saloons, doctors and lawyers and other businesses. The post office was named Candalara from August 1876 until November 1882 and then named Candelaria from November 1882. In 1882, the completion of the Carson and Colorado Railroad to Candelaria helped to alleviate the water shortage. With available water, the town continued to thrive for ten years. In 1893 an economic depression in the U.S. halted investment in the mines and many of the mines closed. After that, the town was declined with the post office closing in January 1935.

The population was 7 in 1940.

== Notable person ==
- James E. Casey, founder of United Parcel Service (UPS), was born in Pickhandle Gulch in 1888
