= Sodaville, Nevada =

- Ghost town
- Etymology: Named on account of a mineral spring at the original town site
- Location within Nevada Location within the United States
- Coordinates: 38°20′28″N 118°06′10″W
- Country: United States
- State: Nevada
- County: Mineral
- Elevation: 4,652 ft (1,418 m)
- Time zone: UTC-8 (Pacific (PST))
  - Summer (DST): PDT (UTC-7)

Sodaville is an extinct town in Mineral County, in the U.S. state of Nevada. The GNIS classifies it as a populated place.

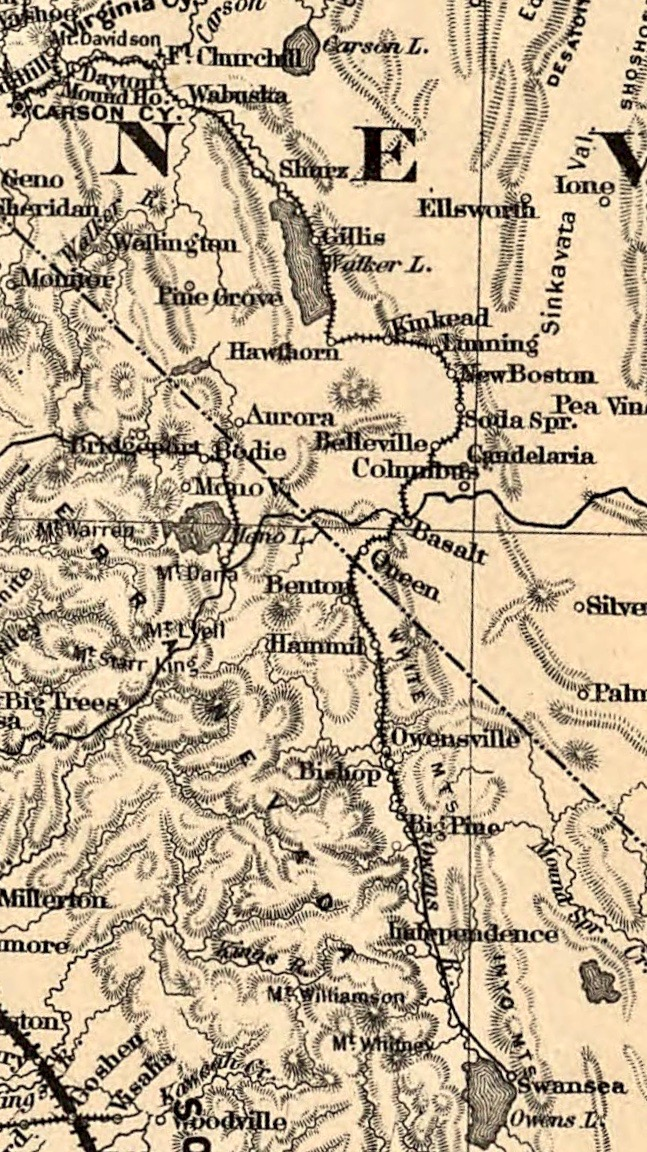
Carson and Colorado Route in 1883 showing Soda Spr.

== History ==
A variant name was "Soda Springs". A post office called Sodaville was established in 1882, and remained in operation until 1917.

Initially, a railroad station was intended to be at Sodaville, but an agreement between the railroad and land speculators could not be reached, so Mina, Nevada was platted two miles north of Sodaville.

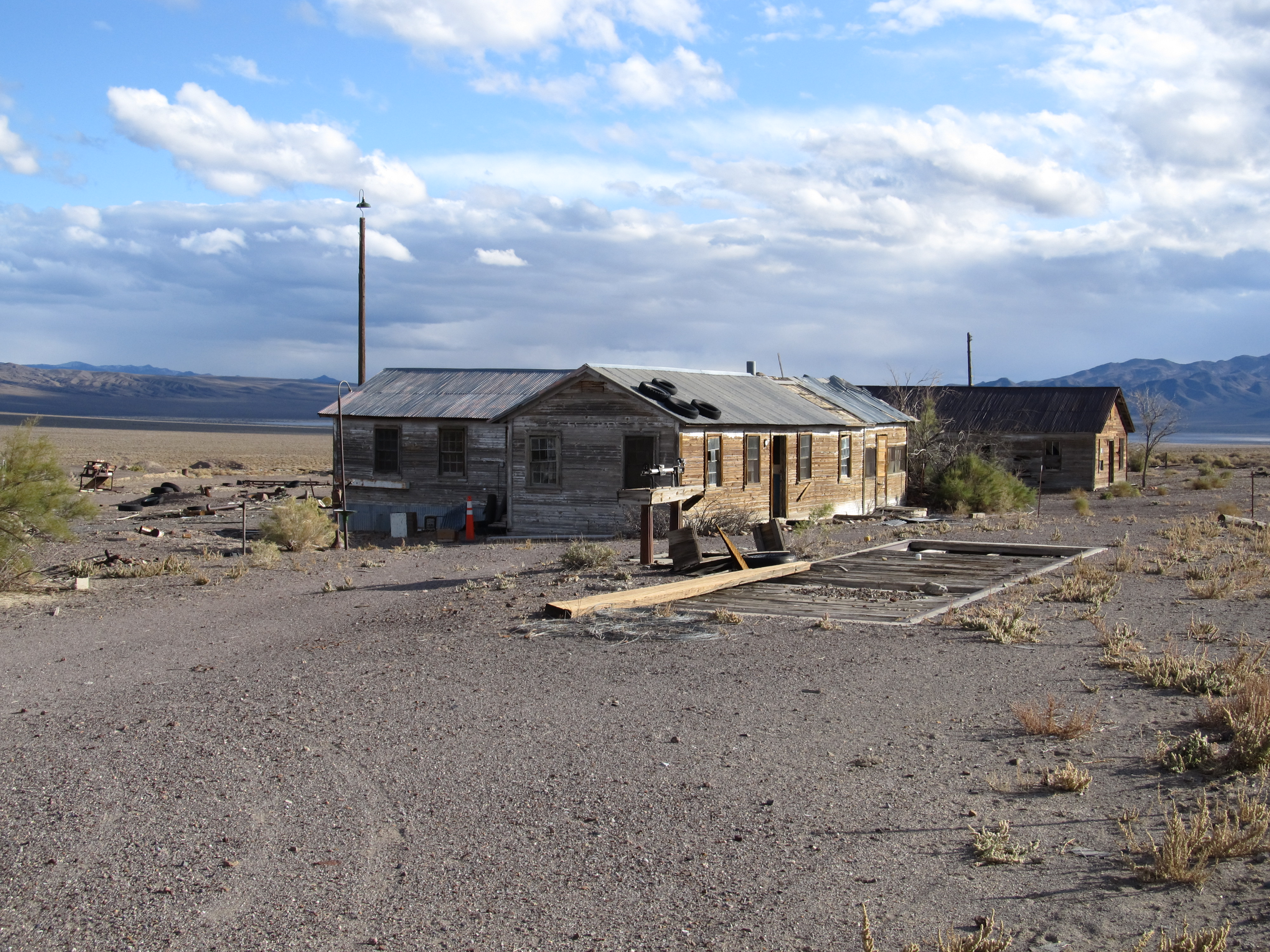
Sodaville

== See also ==
- Thenardite, a sodium sulfate mineral, Na_{2}SO_{4}, found at Sodaville
