= Basalt, Nevada =

- Ghost town
- Location within Nevada Location within the United States
- Country: United States
- State: Nevada
- County: Mineral
- Elevation: 6,339 ft (1,932 m)

Basalt is a formerly populated place located in Mineral County, Nevada.

Basalt was a station on the Carson and Colorado Railway.

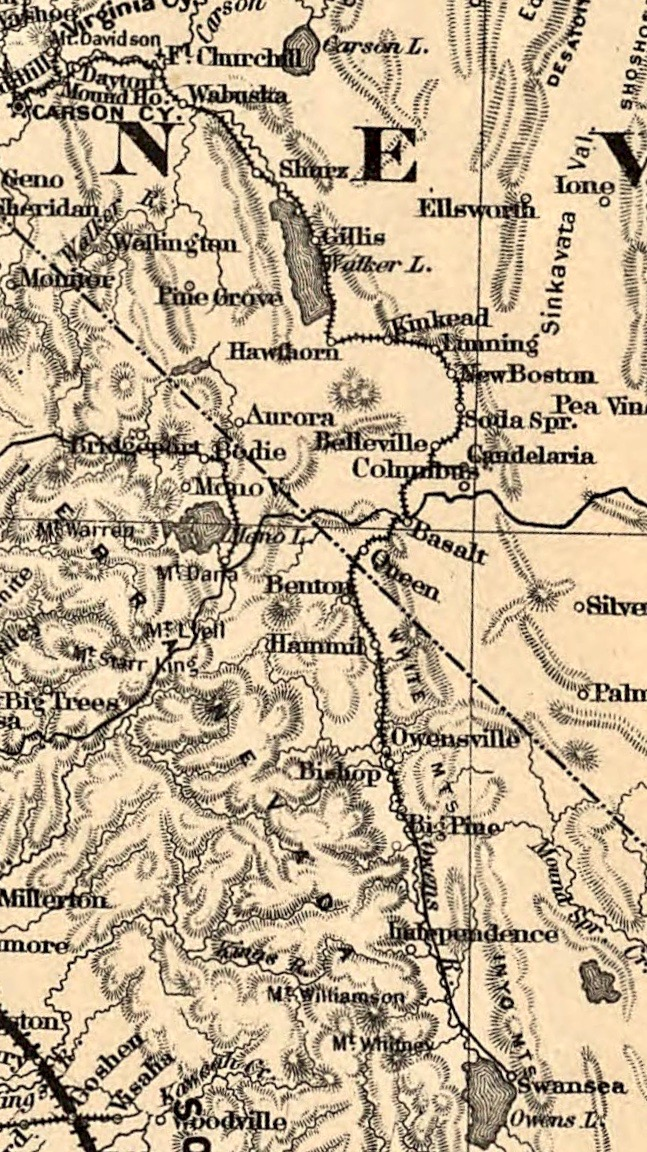
Route of the Carson and Colorado Railway in 1883 showing Basalt

The Basalt Post Office operated from March 1906 until August 1906.

In 1905, Diatomaceous Earth was discovered in the vicinity of Basalt. In 1937, it was reported that last shipments in 1927 and 1928 totaled 5,000 tons that were shipped to Los Angeles.

In 1940, it was reported that Basalt had an estimated population of 6 and that it was a small supply center for prospectors.

In 1944, quarrying of diatomaceous earth commenced again. In 1945 the United States Diatom Company sold its claims at Basalt to the Dicalite Company. In 2018, 15 employees worked at the mine, which straddled Mineral and Esmeralda counties, producing 2,268 tons of diatomaceous earth.
