= Lucky Boy, Nevada =

- Ghost town
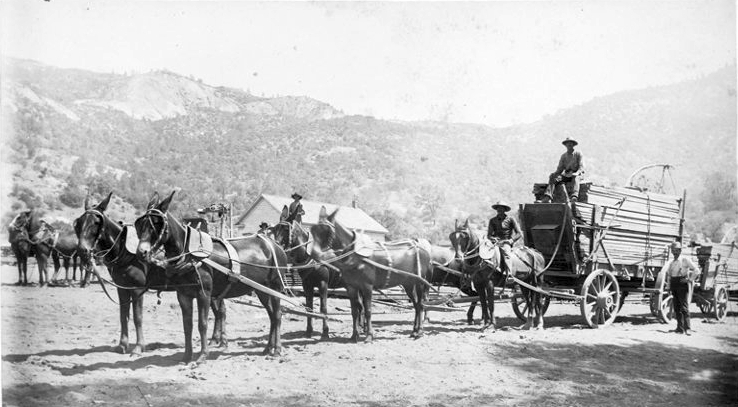
- Lucky Boy, circa 1906

- Location within Nevada Location within the United States
- Coordinates: 38°27′37″N 118°40′44″W
- Country: United States
- State: Nevada
- County: Mineral
- Elevation: 6,214 ft (1,894 m)
- Time zone: UTC-8 (Pacific (PST))
  - Summer (DST): UTC-7 (PDT)
- GNIS feature ID: 860437

Lucky Boy is a ghost town in Mineral County, Nevada, approximately 5 mi (8.0 km) southwest of Hawthorne.

The Lucky Boy Mine was located east of the town on the east slope of the Wassuk Range, discovered by men repairing a stage road over a pass. In 1909 there were about 200 people in the camp. A post office was established March 19, 1909 and discontinued October 31, 1913.

A serious stage coach accident occurred near Lucky Boy in 1909, when "six spirited horses took fright" and then "dragged the passengers down a steep grade at lightning speed".

A mill was built in 1923 at the cost of US$210,000 (equivalent to $3,970,000 in 2025) but only operated for less than three years. In 1938, the property started shipping ore again with a rail car load to a Salt Lake City smelter. The mill was in operation until late December 1941 when it was closed due to restrictions caused by World War II, though the mine continued to operate with a small staff. In 1945, the mill and mine were both to reopen.
