= Mina, Nevada =

- Census-designated place
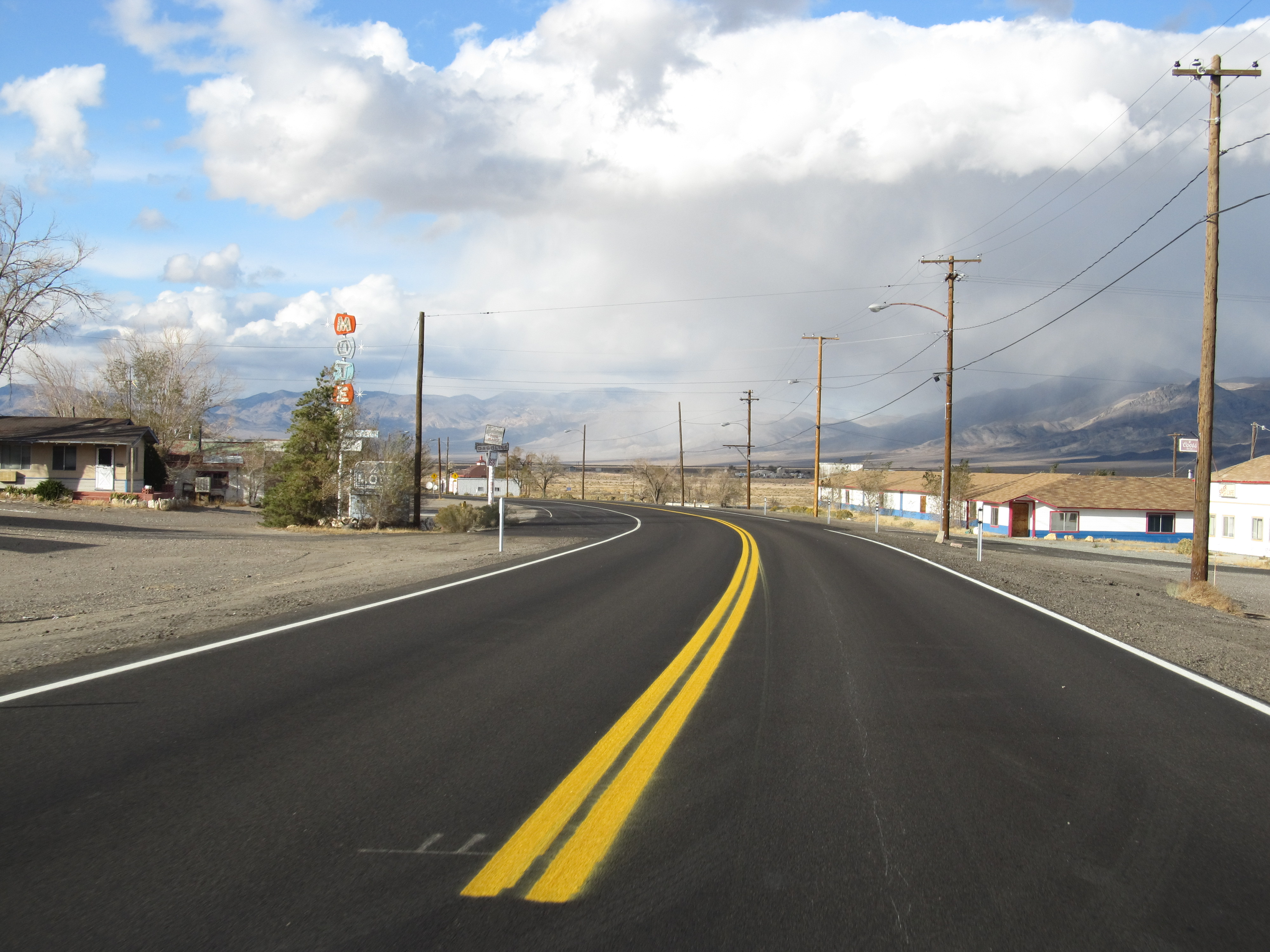

- Mina is located in the Tonopah Basin of Nevada. Mina (the United States)
- Coordinates: 38°23′26″N 118°6′31″W
- Country: United States
- State: Nevada
- County: Mineral
- Founded: 1905; 121 years ago
- Named after: Ferminia Sarras

Area
  - Total: 2.41 sq mi (6.24 km^{2})
  - Land: 2.41 sq mi (6.23 km^{2})
  - Water: 0 sq mi (0.00 km^{2})
- Elevation: 4,546 ft (1,386 m)

Population (2020)
  - Total: 127
  - Density: 52.8/sq mi (20.37/km^{2})
- Time zone: UTC-8 (PST)
  - Summer (DST): UTC-7 (PDT)
- ZIP code: 89422
- Area code: 775
- FIPS code: 32-46800
- GNIS feature ID: 0842148

Mina is an unincorporated community and census-designated place (CDP) in Mineral County in west-central Nevada, United States. It is located along U.S. Route 95 (38° 23' 25" N 118° 06' 30" W) at an elevation of 4,560 feet (1,390 m). The population at the 2020 census was 127.

== History ==
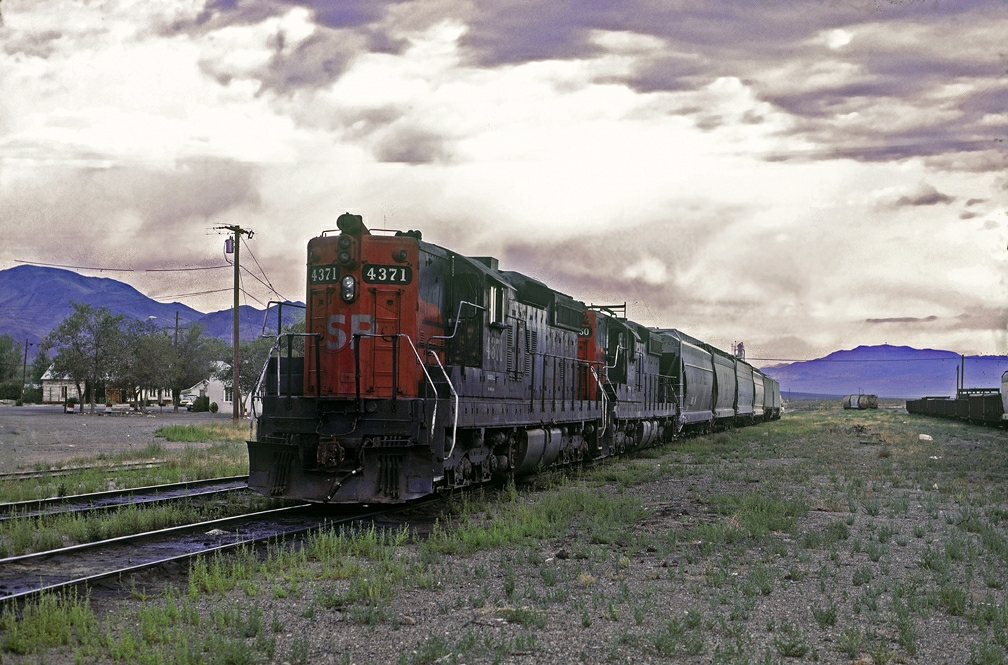
Southern Pacific freight train in Mina, 1984

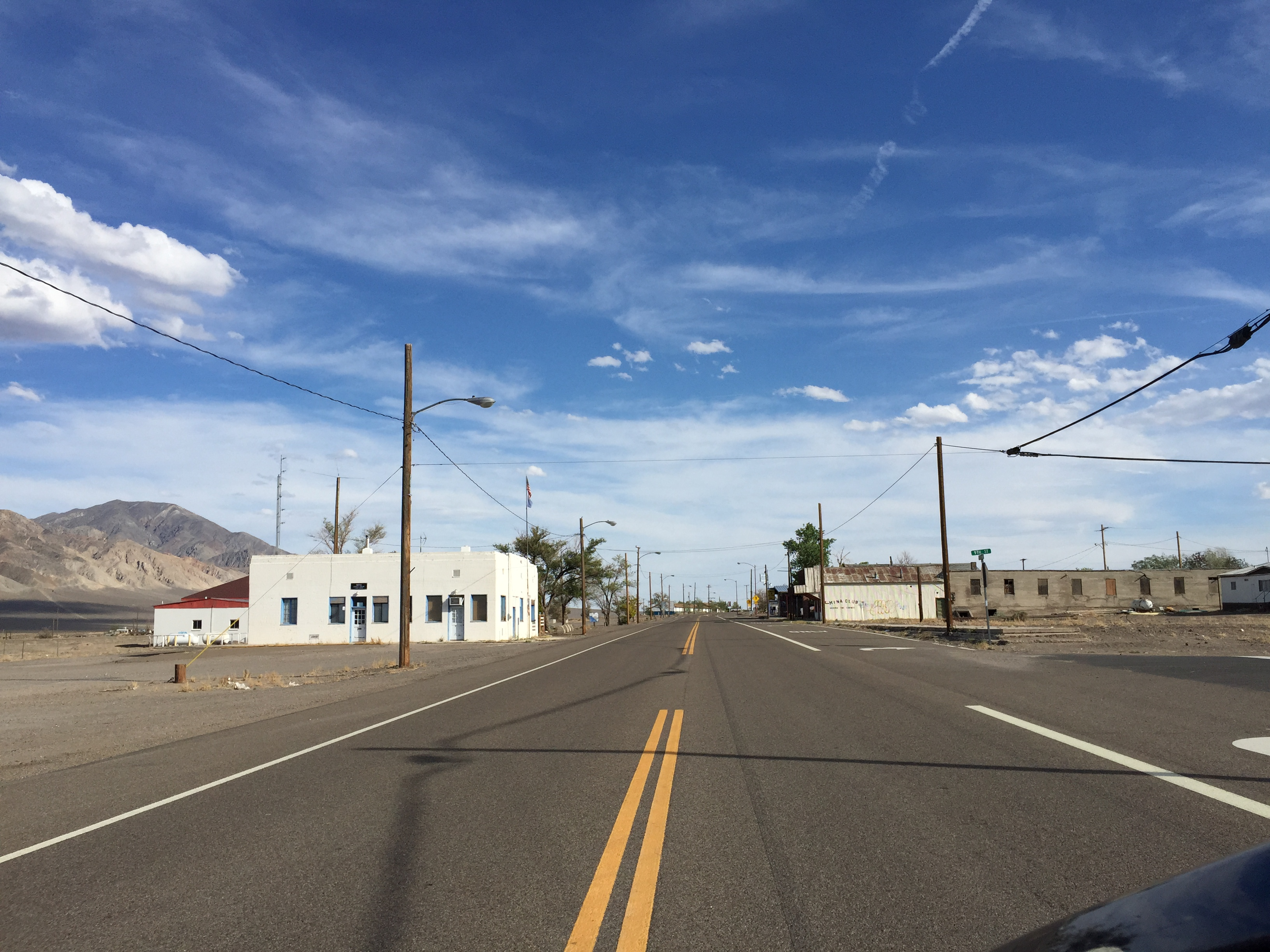
View south along US 95 in Mina, 2015

Mina was founded as a railroad town in 1905 and was named for Ferminia Sarras, a large landowner and famed prospector known as the "Copper Queen". The Carson and Colorado Railway, a division of Southern Pacific Railroad, had a station in the town. The railroad is long gone – the last section between Thorne and Mina shut down in 1985 – but at one time a local shuttle called the "Slim Princess" allowed Native Americans to ride free of charge atop the railcars, and passengers and crew would shoot wild game from open windows. The train moved slowly enough that hunters were able to retrieve their game and reboard.

Gee Jon and Hughie Sing were convicted of the August 27, 1921, murder in Mina of Tom Quong Kee. Gee Jon, a 29-year-old member of the Hop Sing Tong, became the first person to be executed by lethal gas. The execution was at the Nevada State Prison on February 8, 1924.

=== Name ===
Some sources state that the name is derived from the Spanish word meaning "mine". Other sources state that John C. Fulton (or John M. Fulton), division general manager for the Southern Pacific Railroad, named the town after Fermina Sarras (or Sarrias), a Nicaraguan woman who was operating nearby copper prospects.

Initially a railroad station was intended to be at Sodaville, but agreement between the railroad and land speculators could not be reached, so Mina, Nevada, was platted two miles north of Sodaville.

== Geography ==
Mina is located in the Soda Spring Valley of eastern Mineral County along U.S. Route 95, 32 miles (51 km) southeast of Hawthorne and 70 miles (110 km) northwest of Tonopah. According to the U.S. Census Bureau, the Mina CDP has an area of 2.41 square miles (6.24 km^{2}), of which 0.001 square miles (0.6 acres), or 0.04%, are water.

=== Climate ===
The Köppen Climate System classifies the weather in this area as semi-arid, abbreviated BSk. This climate type occurs primarily on the periphery of true deserts in low-latitude semiarid steppe regions.

Climate data for Mina, Nevada, 1991–2020 normals, extremes 1896–present
| Month | Jan | Feb | Mar | Apr | May | Jun | Jul | Aug | Sep | Oct | Nov | Dec | Year |
|---|---|---|---|---|---|---|---|---|---|---|---|---|---|
| Record high °F (°C) | 71 (22) | 78 (26) | 89 (32) | 96 (36) | 102 (39) | 106 (41) | 111 (44) | 110 (43) | 105 (41) | 94 (34) | 81 (27) | 71 (22) | 111 (44) |
| Mean maximum °F (°C) | 60.9 (16.1) | 65.9 (18.8) | 75.0 (23.9) | 83.8 (28.8) | 91.0 (32.8) | 100.1 (37.8) | 104.0 (40.0) | 101.8 (38.8) | 96.3 (35.7) | 86.6 (30.3) | 72.0 (22.2) | 60.3 (15.7) | 104.5 (40.3) |
| Mean daily maximum °F (°C) | 49.0 (9.4) | 54.0 (12.2) | 62.2 (16.8) | 68.3 (20.2) | 77.7 (25.4) | 88.9 (31.6) | 97.4 (36.3) | 95.6 (35.3) | 86.4 (30.2) | 72.4 (22.4) | 58.3 (14.6) | 47.6 (8.7) | 71.5 (21.9) |
| Daily mean °F (°C) | 38.2 (3.4) | 42.4 (5.8) | 49.0 (9.4) | 54.7 (12.6) | 64.1 (17.8) | 74.4 (23.6) | 82.2 (27.9) | 79.8 (26.6) | 70.5 (21.4) | 57.5 (14.2) | 45.8 (7.7) | 36.9 (2.7) | 58.0 (14.4) |
| Mean daily minimum °F (°C) | 27.3 (−2.6) | 30.8 (−0.7) | 35.7 (2.1) | 41.0 (5.0) | 50.5 (10.3) | 59.8 (15.4) | 67.0 (19.4) | 64.0 (17.8) | 54.5 (12.5) | 42.6 (5.9) | 33.2 (0.7) | 26.2 (−3.2) | 44.4 (6.9) |
| Mean minimum °F (°C) | 10.4 (−12.0) | 15.4 (−9.2) | 19.6 (−6.9) | 25.4 (−3.7) | 35.4 (1.9) | 42.3 (5.7) | 55.8 (13.2) | 52.3 (11.3) | 39.1 (3.9) | 26.4 (−3.1) | 16.9 (−8.4) | 8.9 (−12.8) | 6.3 (−14.3) |
| Record low °F (°C) | −23 (−31) | −20 (−29) | 0 (−18) | 7 (−14) | 20 (−7) | 21 (−6) | 32 (0) | 34 (1) | 18 (−8) | 10 (−12) | 0 (−18) | −23 (−31) | −23 (−31) |
| Average precipitation inches (mm) | 0.48 (12) | 0.54 (14) | 0.46 (12) | 0.57 (14) | 0.83 (21) | 0.33 (8.4) | 0.53 (13) | 0.24 (6.1) | 0.23 (5.8) | 0.57 (14) | 0.29 (7.4) | 0.50 (13) | 5.57 (140.7) |
| Average snowfall inches (cm) | 2.0 (5.1) | 1.7 (4.3) | 1.0 (2.5) | 0.7 (1.8) | 0.2 (0.51) | 0.0 (0.0) | 0.0 (0.0) | 0.0 (0.0) | 0.0 (0.0) | 0.0 (0.0) | 0.8 (2.0) | 1.4 (3.6) | 7.8 (19.81) |
| Average precipitation days (≥ 0.01 in) | 3.4 | 4.4 | 4.1 | 3.6 | 4.4 | 2.4 | 2.6 | 1.8 | 2.0 | 2.2 | 2.2 | 3.3 | 36.4 |
| Average snowy days (≥ 0.1 in) | 1.4 | 1.3 | 0.7 | 0.4 | 0.0 | 0.0 | 0.0 | 0.0 | 0.0 | 0.0 | 0.5 | 1.2 | 5.5 |
Source 1: NOAA
Source 2: National Weather Service

== Demographics ==
Historical population
| Census | Pop. | Note | %± |
|---|---|---|---|
| 2010 | 155 | | — |
| 2020 | 127 | | −18.1% |
U.S. Decennial Census
