= List of ghost towns in Nevada =

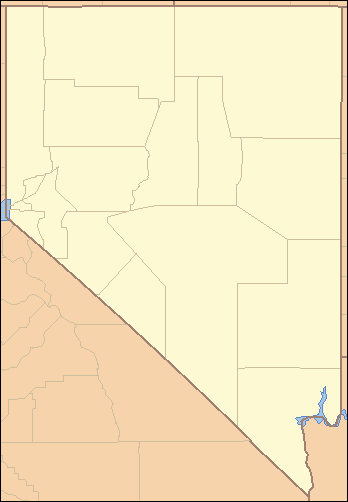

Most ghost towns in Nevada in the United States are former mining boomtowns that were abandoned when the mines closed. Those that were not set up as mining camps were usually established as locations for mills, or supply points for nearby mining operations.

In Clark County, settlements along the Colorado River have been submerged underneath the reservoirs of Lake Mead or Lake Mohave.

== Conditions ==
Ghost towns can include sites in various states of disrepair and abandonment. Some sites no longer have any trace of buildings or civilization, and have reverted to empty land. Other sites are unpopulated but still have standing buildings. Still others may support full-time residents, though usually far fewer than at their historical peak, while others may now be museums or historical sites.

For ease of reference, the sites listed have been placed into one of the following general categories.

Barren site

- Site is no longer in existence
- Site has been destroyed, covered with water, or has reverted to empty land
- May have at most a few difficult-to-find foundations/footings

Neglected site

- Little more than rubble remains at the site
- Dilapidated, often roofless buildings remain at the site

Abandoned site

- Buildings or houses still standing, but all or almost all are abandoned
- No population, with the possible exception of a caretaker
- Site no longer in use, except for one or two buildings

Semi-abandoned site

- Buildings or houses still standing, but most are abandoned
- A few residents may remain

Historic site

- Buildings or houses still standing
- Site has been converted to a historical site, museum, or tourist attraction
- Still a busy community, but population is smaller than in its peak years

== List of ghost towns in Nevada ==
Nevada ghost towns
Town	Other names	Image	County	Established	Disestablished	Status	Notes
Alturas			Clark	1861			In El Dorado Canyon near Techatticup Mine in the Colorado Mining District.
Aurora			Mineral	1860		Neglected site	According to published time-lines, Aurora's population suffered greatly in 1865. Only two mills were still in operation. In 1866 much of the town was leveled in a Great fire That burned most of the business district. A second fire followed in 1873, and by 1880 the population had dropped down to less than 500 persons.
Austin			Lander	1862		Historic site	Clifton was still active in 1865 but when the mill closed in 1867, the town was abandoned. While Austin's mining activity was at its peak during the late 1860s ...
Beatty			Nye	1905		Historic site	Around Indian Springs, Nevada. Beatty is known for two things, as a gateway to Death Valley and the ever-popular road trip stop, the Death Valley Nut and Candy Company.
Belleville			Mineral	1872 (1915)	1892 (1918)		By the late 1880s pipes delivered water to Candelaria and allowed local mills to begin operation, reducing the need for shipping costs. Belleville could not survive the competition and was deserted by 1892.
Belmont			Nye	1865	1922	Semi-abandoned site	Former Nye County courthouse in Belmont is preserved as Belmont Courthouse State Historic Park.
Berlin			Nye	1897	1911	Historic site	Preserved within Berlin–Ichthyosaur State Park
Bermond Station	Bermond, Frenchman, Frenchman's Station		Churchill	1920	1926		The site was also known as Frenchman or "Frenchy's and later as Bermond Station from 1920 to 1926.
Blair			Esmeralda	1906	1916	Neglected site	The site of the largest stamp mill in Nevada (100 stamps), at the time
Bristol Wells	Bristol City, National City, Tempest		Lincoln	1872	1905	Abandoned site	By 1893, however, Bristol Well fell out of use. In 1900, a copper leaching plant was built to treat ore from the Bristol Mine, but it only operated for two years. After the railroad was completed through Lincoln County in 1905, Bristol Well wasn't used again.
Broken Hills			Mineral	1913	1940	Neglected site	Broken Hills is a ghost town in Mineral County, Nevada. It was primarily the site of the mining operation of miners, Joseph Arthur and James Stratford from ...
Bullfrog			Nye	1904	1907	Neglected site	Founded just south of Rhyolite, had a rivalry with Rhyolite. Rhyolite eventually won out before becoming a ghost town as well.
Bullionville			Lincoln	1870	1882	Barren site	A reliable water supply supported milling in town until nearby Pioche built waterworks to supply water to Pioche mills. Afterward, Bullioniville was slowly abandoned.
Cactus Springs			Nye	1910	1935		Cactus Springs is a ghost town in Nye County, Nevada. It is currently within the boundaries of the Nellis Air Force Range.
Callville			Clark	1864	1869	Submerged under Callville Bay of Lake Mead	Steamboat landing, County seat of Pah-Ute County, Arizona Territory (1865–67), post office (1867–69)
Candelaria			Mineral	1864	1939	Neglected site	The Northern Belle mine produced 15 million dollars in silver during production.
Chafey	Dun Glen		Pershing	1908	1913		Was originally called Dun Glen.
Charleston			Elko	1876	1956	Abandoned site	Charleston is a ghost town in Elko County, Nevada, United States. ... It lies along the Bruneau River just south of the Mountain City and Jarbidge Ranger ...
Clifton			Lander	1862		Semi-abandoned site	Just west of Austin.
Coaldale			Esmeralda	1894	1993	Neglected site	Leaking fuel tanks forced closure of the gas station around 1993, and with no other reason to stop, the place folded. Sometime in the mid-2000s the restaurant mysteriously caught fire. Over the years, a number of people were involved in what would be known in later years as Coaldale.
Cobre			Elko				By 1937, only about 20 people lived in Cobre, and in November 1948 the Southern Pacific abandoned the station. Ore shipments continued through Cobre until June 20, 1983, when the smelter at McGill closed. Today, not much remains of Cobre and a large cinderblock engine house from the 1960s dominates the site.
Colorado City			Clark	1861		Submerged under Lake Mohave	Steamboat landing near the mouth of El Dorado Canyon in the Colorado Mining District.
Columbus			Esmerelda	1865	1881	Neglected site	
Como			Lyon	1861	1930s		Post office 1879–1881, 1903–1905; mining town occupied intermittently, activity finally ceasing in the 1930s after the closing of a sawmill.
Cortez			Lander	1863	1930		George Hearst mined at the area in the 1860s.
Crystal Springs			Lincoln				
Currant			Nye	1865	1871		
Daveytown			Humboldt	1910	1930		
Deeth			Elko	1869	1915		A depot and trading center for local ranchers and ranchers from adjacent counties.
Delamar	Ferguson		Lincoln	1890	1909		In 1897, Delamar had a population of 3,000.
Delano			Elko	1872	1927		The town was the site of a small gold-mining district that saw production from the 1870s to the 1960s.
Dixie Valley			Churchill	1861			
Dun Glen			Pershing	1862	1894		Later became Chafey.
Eagleville			Mineral	1885	1915	Neglected site	
El Dorado City			Clark	1863	1880s	Barren site	Mining camp in El Dorado Canyon in the Colorado Mining District. Site of the El Dorado Mills.
Etna			Pershing	1865	1872		
Fairview			Churchill	1905	1919		At its height, Fairview had 27 saloons.
Fish Lake Valley			Esmeralda				
Flanigan			Washoe	1909	1973		
Fort Churchill			Lyon				Preserved within Fort Churchill State Historic Park
Frenchman	Bermond, Bermond Station, Frenchman's Station		Churchill	1906	1920		The site was also known as Frenchy's and later as Bermond Station 1920–26
Genoa	Mormon Station		Douglas	1851		Historic site	Originally called Mormon Station. Now part of Mormon Station State Historic Park
Golconda			Humboldt	1869	1908	Semi-abandoned town	Golconda's hot springs were a famous landmark for westbound travelers.
Gold Center			Nye	1904	1919	Barren site	The origin of Gold Center's name is a mystery, for it was not the center of anything and it had no gold. It was a critical water source for nearby Bullfrog and Rhyolite and at one time had a large brewery and the only distilled water ice plant in Nevada.
Gold Point			Esmeralda				
Goldfield			Esmeralda	1902		Semi-abandoned town	
Goodsprings			Clark	1900			
Grantsville			Nye				
Hamilton	Cave City		White Pine	1868	1931		Hamilton was originally called Cave City, because early arrivals set up camp in nearby caves.
Hardin City			Humboldt	1858	1866	Neglected	
Hiko			Lincoln	1865	1882	Semi-abandoned town	Hiko was a Native American expression meaning "white man's town".
Ione			Nye	1863	1930s		At its peak, Ione had 100 houses and a population of 500.
Jacobsville			Lander	1859	Late 1870s		A Pony Express station and the first seat of Lander County.
Jarbidge			Elko	1909			
Jessup	White Canyon		Churchill	1908			
Johnnie			Nye	1890	1935	Barren site	Water in town was scarce. It was drawn from a spring four miles away, packed in canvas bags, and hauled to town by donkeys.
Johntown			Lyon	1853	1860s	Barren site	Considered to be the first ghost town of Nevada.
Jungo			Humboldt	1911	1952	Barren	Post office from January 1911 until May 1952
Lahontan City			Churchill	1911	1915	Neglected	Developed to house workers during the construction of Lahontan Dam
Lander			Lander	1880	1921		
Logan	Logan City, Logan Springs, Logans Springs		Lincoln	1865	1930		
Louisville			Clark	1861	1862		In El Dorado Canyon near the Techatticup Mine in the Colorado Mining District.
Lucky Jim Camp	Lucky Camp		Clark	1862		Barren site	In El Dorado Canyon near the Techatticup Mine in the Colorado Mining District.
Marietta			Mineral	1867	1894	Neglected site	
Mazuma			Pershing	1907	1912		Post office: 1907–1912. Site of flash flood that killed at least eight and destroyed most of the town.
Metropolis			Elko	1909			
Midas	Gold Circle		Elko	1908	1942		The camp was first called Gold Circle, but when the post office was established in 1907, officials decided that Nevada had too many towns with "gold" in their names, and the town was renamed Midas.
Millers			Esmeralda				
Miriam			Churchill				Non-agency station of the SPRR
Mountain City			Elko	1870		Semi-abandoned town	
Nevada City			Churchill	1916	1919		A co-operative colony
Ocala			Churchill				
Osceola			White Pine				
Palisade			Eureka	1868	1910		
Palmetto			Esmeralda	1866	1920s	Neglected site	Miners named the town after local Joshua trees, which they thought were related to the palmetto tree.
Parran			Churchill	1910			A telegraph station and post office. Post office closed 1913.
Pine Grove			Lyon	1866	1918	Abandoned site	Several buildings remain.
Pioneer			Nye	1908	1931	Barren site	Post office 1909–1931.
Poeville	Peavine		Washoe	1864	1880		Post office 1874–1878.
Potosi			Clark			Barren site	
Quartz Mountain			Nye	1905	1922	Barren site	Located inside the Nellis Air Force Base Bombing and Gunnery Range.
Ragtown			Churchill	1854			Leeteville may be the same location.
Rawhide			Mineral	1907		Barren site	Rawhide Mining Co. has destroyed any remains of the town. Now it is just an open pit mine. Devastating fire in 1908, $1 million in property damage and thousands left homeless.
Rhyolite			Nye	1905	1916	Abandoned site	Post office closed 1913
Rio Tinto			Elko	1932	1948		A few houses and the school remain.
Rioville	Junction City		Clark	1869	1906	Site is now under Lake Mead.	Originally Junction City, Rioville had a post office from 1881 to 1906.
Rochester			Pershing	1912	1942		
Ruby Hill			Eureka	1873	1910		
Ruth			White Pine				
Saint Joseph			Clark	1865	1868	Barren	Site located west of the north end of Overton Airport and east of the Muddy River. It burned down in 1868. Town name and population moved to what is now Logandale.
St. Thomas			Clark				Submerged beneath Lake Mead. Ruins became visible when the waters of the lake were lowered.
Salt Wells			Churchill		2007		Site of a borax plant, bar, gas station and former brothel.
San Jacinto			Elko	1870	1938		A former mining boomtown that was incorporated April 9, 1888. Its Post Office closed in April 1938.
San Juan	Upper Camp		Clark	1862			The camp was abandoned just weeks after being established.
Scossa			Pershing	1931	1937		One of the last important mining camps in Nevada.
Seven Troughs			Pershing	1907	1918		
Silver Canyon			Lincoln				
Simonsville			Clark	1865	1870s	Barren	Originally called Mill Point, located west of the south end of Overton Airport and east of the Muddy River.
Spruce Mountain			Elko				
Star City			Pershing				
Stillwater			Churchill	1862			
Sulphur			Humboldt			Neglected	
Tempiute			Lincoln	1868	1957		In the 1950s, the Lincoln mine was one of the primary producers of tungsten in the U.S.
Tenabo			Lander	1907	1930s		
Treasure City			White Pine	1869			
Tybo			Nye				
Unionville			Pershing			Semi-abandoned town	
Vernon			Pershing	1905			
Vya			Washoe				
Washoe City			Washoe	1860	1910s	Neglected site	
White Cloud City	Coppereid		Churchill				Also known as Coppereid
White Plains			Churchill	1879	1909		"No vegetation meets the eye when gazing on the vast expanse of dirty white alkali."
Wonder			Churchill	1906			Post office closed 1920.
