= Pine Grove Township =

Pine Grove Township or Pinegrove Township may refer to the following places in the United States:

- Pine Grove Township, Michigan
- Pine Grove Township, Schuylkill County, Pennsylvania
- Pine Grove Township, Warren County, Pennsylvania
- Pinegrove Township, Pennsylvania

== See also ==
- Pine Grove (disambiguation)
