= Pine Grove =

Pine Grove or pinegrove may refer to:

== Australia ==
- Pine Grove, Victoria

== Canada ==
=== British Columbia ===
- Pinegrove, British Columbia

=== Nova Scotia ===
- Pine Grove, Colchester County
- Pine Grove, Lunenburg County

=== Ontario ===
- Pine Grove, a community in Lanark Highlands, Ontario
- Pine Grove, a community in Norfolk County, Ontario
- Pine Grove, a community in North Glengarry, Ontario
- Pine Grove, Regional Municipality of York, Ontario, in southwestern Woodbridge, Ontario
- Pine Grove Public School, Oakville, Ontario
- Pinegrove, a community in McNab/Braeside

== United States ==
=== California ===
- Pine Grove, Amador County, California
- Pine Grove, Lake County, California
- Pine Grove, Mendocino County, California
- Pine Grove, Sierra County, California, a ghost town

=== Illinois ===
- Pine Grove, Grundy County, Illinois

=== Massachusetts ===
- Pine Grove Cemetery (Leominster, Massachusetts)
- Pine Grove Cemetery (Lynn, Massachusetts)

=== Michigan ===
- Pine Grove Township, Michigan
- Pine Grove Historical Museum, former estate of Governor Moses Wisner, Pontiac, Michigan

=== New York ===
- Pine Grove, New York, a community in Watson, New York

=== Nevada ===
- Pine Grove, Nevada, a ghost town near Yerington, Nevada

=== Oregon ===
- Pine Grove, Hood River County, Oregon
- Pine Grove, Klamath County, Oregon
- Pine Grove, Wasco County, Oregon

=== Pennsylvania ===
- Pine Grove Iron Works in Cumberland County
  - Pine Grove Furnace State Park
- Pine Grove, Schuylkill County, Pennsylvania
- Pine Grove Township, Schuylkill County, Pennsylvania
- Pine Grove Township, Warren County, Pennsylvania
- Pinegrove Township, Pennsylvania

=== Texas ===
- Pine Grove, Texas

=== Virginia ===
- Pine Grove, Virginia

=== West Virginia ===
- Pine Grove, Marion County, West Virginia
- Pine Grove, Pleasants County, West Virginia
- Pine Grove, Wetzel County, West Virginia

=== Wisconsin ===
- Pine Grove, Brown County, Wisconsin, an unincorporated community
- Pine Grove, Chippewa County, Wisconsin, an unincorporated community
- Pine Grove, Portage County, Wisconsin, a town

== Other ==
- Pinegrove (band), an American indie rock band
