= Loray, Nevada =

Ghost town in Elko County, NV, US

Coordinates: 41°08′32″N 114°19′05″W

Loray is an extinct town in Elko County in Nevada. The GNIS classifies it as a populated place.

== History ==
Loray once was the shipping point of timber extracted from nearby mountainous forests. In 1941, Loray had 11 inhabitants.

== See also ==
- List of ghost towns in Nevada
