= Frenchman, Nevada =

Former community in Churchill County, Nevada, United States

- Former community
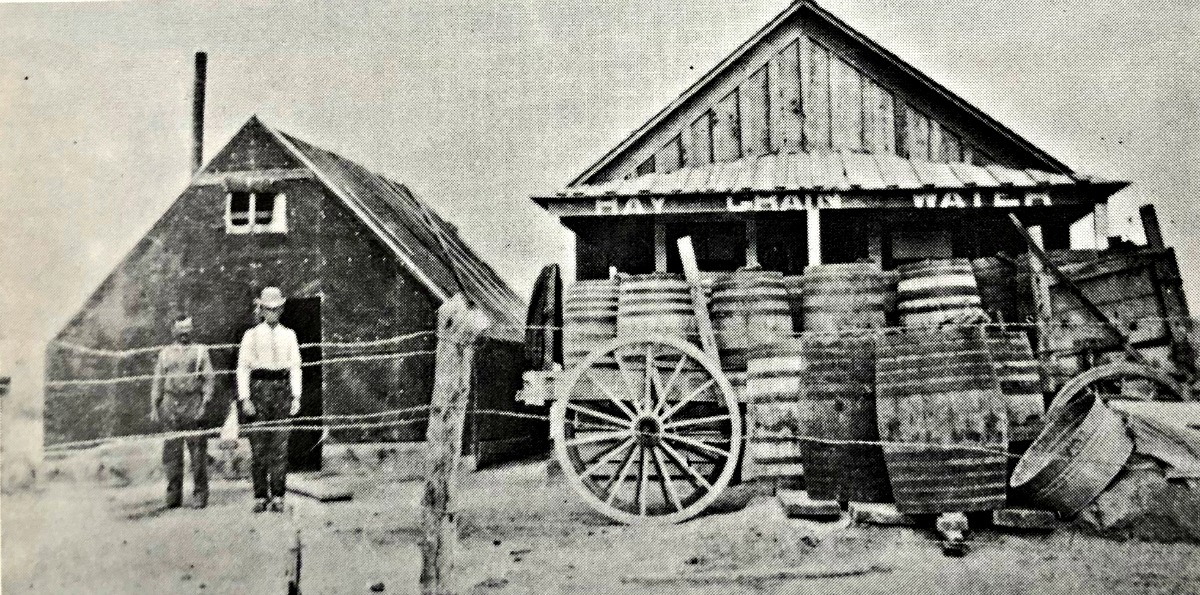
- Frenchman Station, c 1910

- Location within Nevada Location within the United States
- Coordinates: 39°16′46″N 118°16′12″W
- Country: United States
- State: Nevada
- County: Churchill County
- Elevation: 4,157 ft (1,267 m)
- Time zone: UTC-8 (Pacific (PST))
  - Summer (DST): UTC-7 (PDT)
- GNIS feature ID: 857995

Frenchman, also known as Frenchman's Station, Bermond, and Bermond Station, was a community in Churchill County, Nevada, United States. Frenchman was located along U.S. Route 50 30 miles (48 km) east-southeast of Fallon.

== History ==
The community was founded in 1904 as a stagecoach stop; it took its name from Aime "Frenchy" Bermond, a French immigrant. "Frenchy's" offered a respite for people, animals and freight traveling between Fallon, Fairview and Wonder in the early 1900s. The way station provided lodging and food, with a hotel, restaurant, saloons and stables.

The U.S. Navy bought out the community in 1985 due to its proximity to the Dixie Valley bombing range, and its remaining buildings were demolished two years later.

The community is mentioned in the book Blue Highways by William Least Heat-Moon, which includes a picture of Margaret and Laurie Chealander.

== See also ==
- List of ghost towns in Nevada
