= George Rice =

George Rice may refer to:

- George Rice (died 1779) (1724–1779), Member of Parliament (MP) for Carmarthenshire
- George Rice, 3rd Baron Dynevor (1765–1852), his son, British peer and politician; also (MP) for Carmarthenshire
- George Rice-Trevor, 4th Baron Dynevor (1795–1869), his son, British peer and politician, also MP for Carmarthenshire
- George Rice (racing driver) (1914–2003), American race car driver
- George Rice (American football) (1944–2010), American football player
- George W. Rice (businessman) (1823–1856), American businessman known for founding the Massachusetts Mutual Life Insurance Company
- George W. Rice (photographer) (1855–1884), Arctic explorer and photographer
- George O'Hanlon (1912–1989), American comic actor, born George Rice
- George Graham Rice (1870–1943), convicted stock swindler
- George Merrick Rice (1808–1894), American businessman from Worcester, Massachusetts
