= Rio Tinto =

Rio Tinto, meaning "red river", may refer to:

== Businesses ==
- Rio Tinto (corporation), a British-Australian multinational mining and resources corporation
  - Rio Tinto Alcan, based in Canada
  - Rio Tinto Borax in America
    - Rio Tinto Borax Mine, a mine in Boron, California, USA
  - Rio Tinto Coal Australia, the Australian coal mining operation
  - Rio Tinto Energy America, an American operation
  - Rio Tinto Madagascar, a Madagascar mining operation
  - Rio Tinto Tower, a building in Brisbane, Queensland, Australia

== Places ==
=== Brazil ===
- Rio Tinto, Paraíba

=== Portugal ===
- Rio Tinto (Esposende), a civil parish in the Esposende Municipality
- Rio Tinto (Gondomar), a civil parish in municipality of Gondomar

=== Spain ===
- Rio Tinto (river), a river descending from the Sierra Morena mountains of Andalusia, home of the first Rio Tinto Group mine.

=== United States ===
- Rio Tinto, Nevada

== Other uses ==
- America First Field, formerly known as Rio Tinto Stadium, a soccer stadium in Sandy, Utah, U.S.
- Rio Tinto espionage case, a 2009 accusation of bribery and espionage in China
- Rio Tinto FC, a Zimbabwean football club in Kadoma

== See also ==
- Tinto River (Guayape), a river in Honduras
- Tinto (disambiguation)
