= Eagleville =

Eagleville may refer to the following places in the United States:

- Eagleville, California
- Eagleville, Missouri
- Eagleville, Churchill County, Nevada
- Eagleville, Mineral County, Nevada
- Eagleville, Ashtabula County, Ohio
- Eagleville, Wood County, Ohio
- Eagleville, Centre County, Pennsylvania
- Eagleville, Montgomery County, Pennsylvania
- Eagleville, Tennessee
- Eagleville, Wisconsin
