= Rockland, Nevada =

Ghost town in Nevada, United States

Coordinates: 38°39′1″N 119°5′34″W

Rockland is a ghost town in Lyon County, Nevada, in the United States. The town that grew up around the mine was named Rockland, probably for the rocky cliffs that surrounded the area.

== History ==
Near Rockland was found gold in 1868, after the discoveries in Pine Grove. In 1870 Rockland had 150 inhabitants, several saloons and stores, post office. In the spring of 1871 miners didn't receive their salaries and all mining activities ceased. The credit for the founding of Rockland is given to a Mr. Keene, a Pine Grove resident.

Gold was discovered in Rockland in 1868, shortly after discoveries were made at Pine Grove three miles to the northwest. By 1870 the town site had a population of around 150, and the town had several saloons, several stores, post office, and an express office. in the spring of next year the miners did not receive their pay and all mining operations ceased. A furious miner because of the situation set fire to the mill and was convicted of arson and was sent to the state prison in Carson City. The post office was closed in 1872.

In the early 1900s, new miner activities took place in Rockland and the post office once more opened. The area stayed active through World War I, but was closed permanently in 1934. In all about $1 million was pulled out of the local mines over fifty years.
