= White Plains =

White Plains may refer to:

== Places and houses in the United States ==
- White Plains, Calhoun County, Alabama, a census-designated place
- White Plains, Chambers County, Alabama, an unincorporated community
- White Plains, Georgia
- White Plains, Kentucky
- White Plains, Maryland
- White Plains, Nevada
- White Plains, New York
- White Plains, North Carolina
- White Plains (Springville, South Carolina), a historic house
- White Plains (Cookeville, Tennessee), an antebellum plantation house

== Military ==
- Battle of White Plains, near White Plains, New York during the American Revolutionary War
- USS White Plains (AFS-4), a Combat Stores Ship in service from 1968 to 1995
- USS White Plains (CVE-66), an Escort Aircraft Carrier in service from 1943 to 1946, and notable for action in the Battle off Samar

== Other uses ==
- White Plains (band), a British pop-rock band
