= Pine Grove Township, Pennsylvania =

Pine Grove Township is the name of some places in the U.S. state of Pennsylvania:

- Pine Grove Township, Schuylkill County, Pennsylvania
- Pine Grove Township, Warren County, Pennsylvania
- Pinegrove Township, Pennsylvania
