= Willow Point, Nevada =

- Ghost town
- Location within Nevada Location within the United States
- Country: United States
- State: Nevada
- County: Humboldt
- Named for: Humboldt National Forest
- Elevation: 4,334 ft (1,321 m)

Willow Point is an extinct town in Humboldt County, in the U.S. state of Nevada. Willow Point is located in Paradise Valley, south of the town of Paradise Valley and about 20 miles northeast of Winnemucca.

== History ==
In August 1865, a military camp was established at Willow Point on the banks of the Little Humboldt River by Major Michael O'Brien. O'Brien assumed command of troops on the Quinn River after Lt. Col. Charles McDermit was killed by Indians in a skirmish on August 7, 1865. The camp was occupied until October 1865, when the troops withdrew to Camp Dun Glen.

In the later part of the 1800s, Willow Point was a station on the Winnemucca-Paradise Valley route.

A post office was established at Willow Point in 1865, and remained in operation until 1910. By 1910, Willow Point also had a saloon, livery stable and hotel.

An 1890 book includes Willow Point in a list of towns and settlements in Humboldt County.

The community was named for a grove of willows near the original town site. Variant names were "Willow Point Station" and "Willowpoint".
