= Cactus Springs, Nevada =

Cactus Springs is the name for two communities in Nevada.

- Cactus Springs, Clark County, Nevada
- Cactus Springs, Nye County, Nevada
