= Quartz Mountain, Nevada =

Ghost town in Nevada, United States

Coordinates: 39°02′45″N 117°57′59″W

Quartz Mountain is an abandoned post office, ghost town, and mine, located in Nye County, Nevada, United States. Quartz Mountain was a huge interest to more than 15 mining companies in the period between 1926 and 1930. The mines in the area contained high-grade silver and lead ores.

== History ==
=== Silver ore ===
The silver ore on Quartz Mountain was discovered as early as 1920. However, the work at the sight started at 1925. Due to the enthusiasm of nearby villages and towns, an airplane strip was graded, as well as six buildings were moved near the site from Rawhide.

At the time a lot of press releases and newspaper publication claimed that Quartz Mountain would reach the heights of Coeur d'Alene in terms of excavating gold and silver.

After the boom in Quartz Mountain, there were shops established, barbershops, stores, four cafes, and a grocery store. Moreover, the Goldfield Quartz Mountain Mining Co built a mill in 1926.

The San Rafael Consolidated Mines Company took over the site and in January 1928. Soon after, the post office closed on January 15, 1929, along with other properties in the area.

Not long after the whole area became deserted.

The population was 10 in 1940.

=== Meteorite ===
On April 24, 1935, an iron meteorite was discovered five miles away from the Quartz Mountain area. When removing surface materials, miners found out the strange piece of rock. It was later sent to the Nevada State Analytical Laboratory for tests and its origin was determined there.
