= Tenabo, Nevada =

- Ghost Town
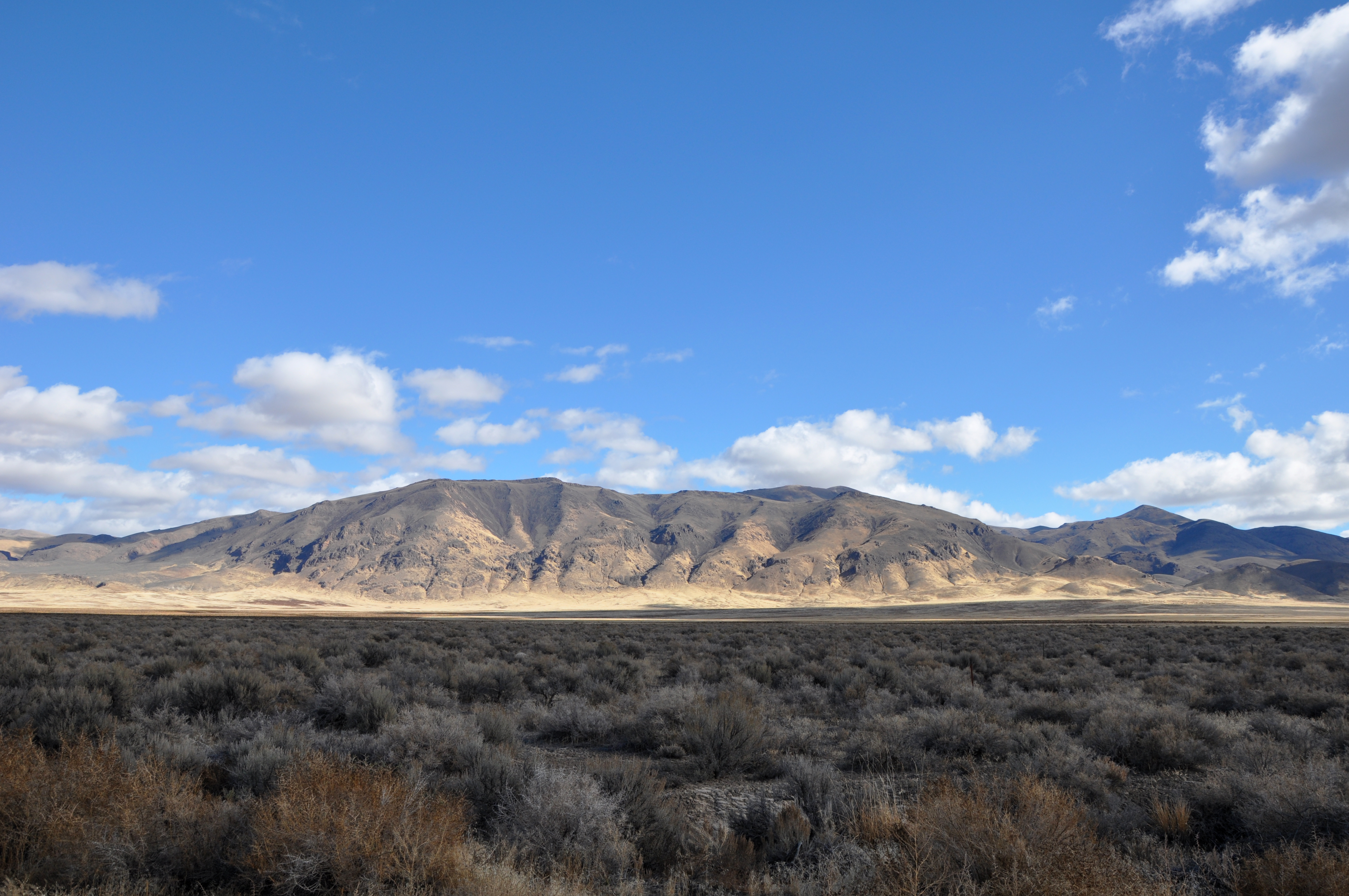
- Eastern side of Shoshone Range

- Location within Nevada
- Coordinates: 40°18′52″N 116°40′36″W
- Country: United States
- State: Nevada
- County: Lander
- Elevation: 5,354 ft (1,632 m)
- GNIS feature ID: 844209

Tenabo is a ghost town in Lander County, Nevada United States.

== History ==
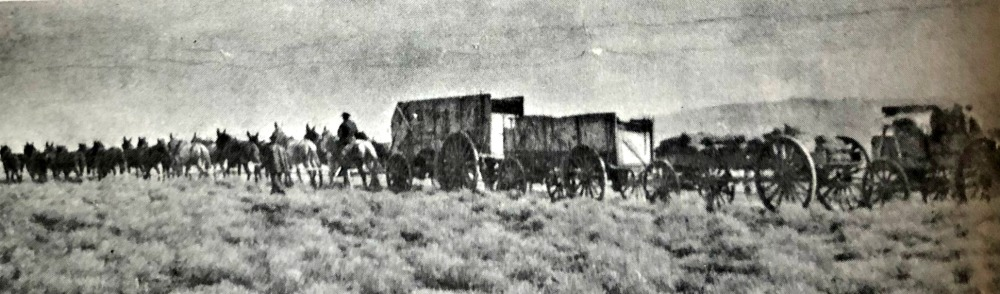
Wagon train hauling silver ore from the Little Gem mine, 1910

In 1905, Charles Montgomery discovered gold near Lander, Nevada on the eastern slope of the Shoshone Range. This new find became the site of Tenabo. In 1907, there was a rush of prospectors to the site. The Tenabo mining camp was established soon after, east of the mines. Within a few months, Tenabo had a population of 1000, a hotel, restaurant, school, saloons and brothels. The scarcity of water was always a challenge for the mining community, and needed to be hauled from springs miles away.

From 1907 to 1910, multiple productive mines kept a mill running, but after 1911, mining operations started to decline. The post office opened in December 1906 and closed July in 1912. In 1916, a miner named A.E. Raleigh discovered placer gold in Mill Gulch nearby. Placer mining continued in the area for the next twenty years.

== Etymology ==
Tenabo may have been named by New Mexicans after an ancient pueblo, or Tenabo may be a Paiute word, meaning of "dark colored water".

== See also ==
- List of ghost towns in Nevada
