= Eagleville, Mineral County, Nevada =

Eagleville, Nevada
- Ghost town
- Location within Nevada Location within the United States
- Coordinates: 39°01′34″N 118°15′10″W
- Country: United States
- State: Nevada
- County: Mineral
- Elevation: 5,561 ft (1,695 m)
- Time zone: UTC-8 (Pacific (PST))
  - Summer (DST): UTC-7 (PDT)
- GNIS feature ID: 854763

Eagleville is a former populated place in Mineral County, Nevada, that is now a ghost town.

== History ==
Mineral deposits were first discovered in the area by the 1870s. Eagleville had some Mormon residents in the 1870s. (Note: "... trade with nearby mining communities, Mormons in Panaca and Eagleville, Nevada, contributed conspicuous sums of gold dust and coin in the 1870s.") Eagleville's post office was in operation from June 1889 until March 1913. Baryte within limestone in large quantities were examined in Eagleville in 1899, but its distance from the railroad deemed it as unprofitable to work.

The Eagleville area produced small amounts of gold and silver in 1905 and 1908-1909. The Jim Barron mine (also known as the Baron mine) was in operation near Eagleville in the 1910s. The Golden Extension Mine was in production from 1915 to 1918.

== Eagleville, Churchill County ==
After Eagleville declined in Mineral County in the 1910s and the 1950s it was noted that a small village was present with the same name in nearby Churchill County. The site is 10.5 miles (16.9 km) northeast of Rawhide, 10 miles (16 km) southeast of Frenchman's Station.

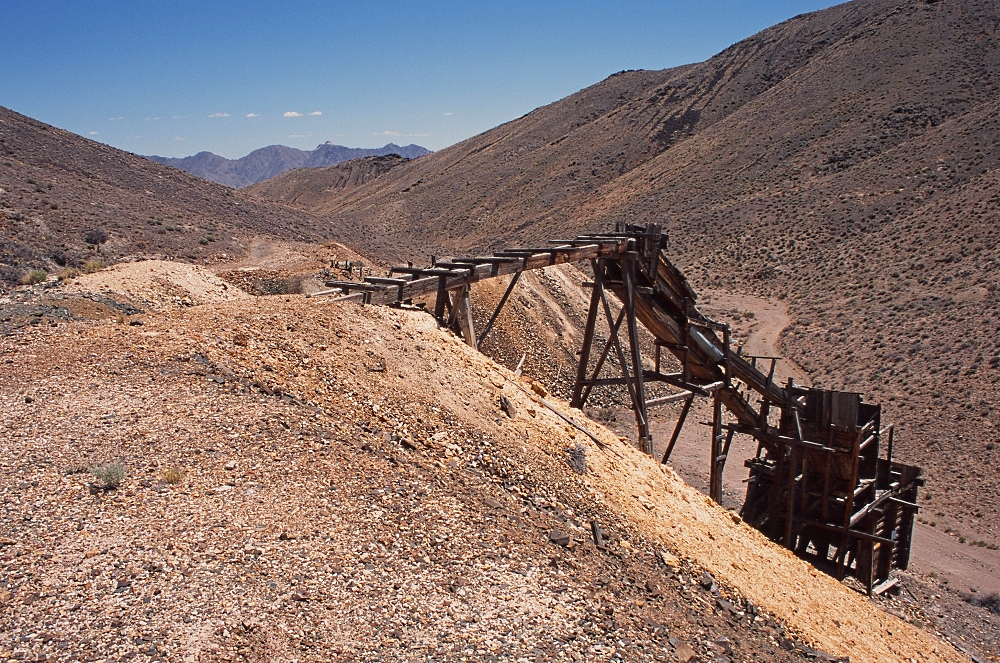
A trestle and ore bin at the Eagleville Mine, Mineral County, Nevada. Mount Annie and Mount Anna are in the distance.
