= Marietta, Nevada =

Ghost town

Marietta was a town in Mineral County, Nevada, United States. It is now a ghost town.

== History ==
The area was extensively prospected by the well-known prospector F.M. "Borax" Smith, and Teel's Marsh near Marietta is often credited with providing Smith his start in the borax business (having earlier been a more common silver and gold prospector). However, before Smith came to the area it had been periodically mined for salt, which was used in the processing of ore in the Virginia City, Aurora, NV, and Bodie, CA mills. The use of camels to transport salt to Virginia City has often been quoted, although there is some dispute whether this actually took place. Mule teams were the more usual method of transporting the salt. F.M. Smith began serious scraping and processing of the borax and salt deposits starting in 1872, mainly from deposits on nearby Teels Marsh.

Marietta was formally established as a town in 1877, and soon contained several hundred people. Exact figures are hard to verify, because many of the workers involved in the scraping process, and at the processing plant on Teels Marsh were Chinese, whose population figures were not accurately kept. The town soon boasted 13 saloons, a post office, several stores (including the one owned and operated by 'Borax' Smith), and many stone and adobe structures. Marietta was a rowdy camp, despite its size, and seemed to garner more than its fair share of criminal activity. The stage service working to and from Marietta was reportedly robbed 30 times in 1880, within one week of that year alone it was robbed 4 times. The town's isolated site made it an easy target for robberies, and for criminals to run freely.

Despite the crime, scraping the marsh and processing the borax and salt was very lucrative, as was some small amount of gold and silver mining nearby. For the better part of 20 years Marietta soldiered on. However, starting in the early to mid 1890s, the markets for borax and salt had expanded from the central and western area of Nevada to the growing markets in southern California. F.M. Smith had found much larger and more extensive borax deposits in the Death Valley, California area, and once he had established his works there, he closed down his operations in Marietta. With this source of income gone, the town quickly faded, and was largely abandoned by the early 1900s. In the 1930s some work in the nearby ranges in silver and gold operations saw a brief resurgence in the town, but this did not last long, and Marietta again slipped into obscurity. There was yet another spate of activity in the 1950s and 60's, with the location of small amounts of uranium ore in the area, but it was never found in large quantities, and large scale activity was never undertaken.

In the past 20 years there has been sporadic mineral exploration in the area. The newer industrial buildings in Marietta are mostly from this activity. A few people live in the area as caretakers. One recent exploration company is The Great Western Mining Corporation, an Irish based exploration company, which concentrates on gold, silver and uranium exploration in the Little Huntoon Valley area near Marietta. Visitors to the site of Marietta should take care not to enter or trespass on any of these private properties while exploring the ruins of the town.

Since 1991 the area is a federally (BLM) managed Wild Burro Range. This 68,000-acre (280 km^{2}) range, which includes the site of Marietta and Teels Marsh, is home to about 85 burros. Small groups of the burros can often be found roaming among the ruins of Marietta.

== Location ==
Marietta is at 38°14′36″N 118°20′19″W, at an elevation of 4947 feet (1508m).

== See also ==
- List of ghost towns in Nevada
