= Clifton, Nevada =

- Ghost town
- Location in the state of Nevada Clifton (the United States)
- Coordinates: 39°29′54″N 117°04′46″W
- Country: United States
- State: Nevada
- County: Lander
- Elevation: 6,339 ft (1,932 m)

Clifton is a ghost town located in Lander County, Nevada, just west of Austin. Clifton, named for the nearby cliffs, was established in 1862 when silver ore was found at the mouth of the Pony Canyon.

The Clifton post office was in operation from March 1863 to February 1864. In 1863, Clifton had about 500 inhabitants and many places of business, including a Wells, Fargo & Co. Express Office. In 1863 a graded road to Austin was completed resulting in many of Clifton's residents and businesses moving to Austin. In January 1864, a petition was created to combine Clifton, Austin and Upper Austin into the "City of Austin." The Governor signed the bill in February 1864.

On July 18, 1863, William Cornell wounded several people in Austin with an axe and then killed 3 people in Clifton.

In 1880, the Austin City Railway was built. The 2.80 mile narrow gauge (3 foot) railway ran from Clifton to Austin. Previously, Clifton was the terminus of the Nevada Central Railroad and freight was moved via wagon to Austin. Initially, the railway used 11 mules to pull one car. In 1881, an engine was ordered from Baldwin Locomotive Works and named "Mules' Relief." In 1882, the engine derailed, killing one of the engineers. Sixteen mules were required to pull the engine back to the tracks.
