= George Graham Rice =

George Graham Rice (June 18, 1870 – October 24, 1943) (originally Jacob Herzig) was a convicted stock swindler. He was known as the "Jackal of Wall Street."

George Graham Rice was born Jacob Simon Herzig in Manhattan to Simon and Anna Herzig. His father was a furrier. In 1890, Herzig was convicted of stealing from his father's business to finance his gambling habits and spent two years in the Elmira Reformatory. In 1895, Herzig was convicted for forgery and spent four years in Sing Sing, also for stealing from his father's business. He changed his name to George Graham Rice, which he took from another inmate. He then worked as a reporter for the New Orleans Times-Democrat. After that he returned to Manhattan and started Maxim & Gay Co., a racetrack tip sheet. However, it was put out of business by the Post Office Department.

In 1904, Rice moved to Goldfield, Nevada and started Nevada Mining News Bureau, an advertising bureau, to promote mining stocks in which he had ownership stakes. In 1906, Rice co-sponsored with Tex Rickard a boxing match in Goldfield between Joe Gans and Battling Nelson, which was the longest boxing match in history, lasting 42 rounds. With Larry Sullivan, he opened the L.M. Sullivan Trust Company, which sold stocks. He promoted stocks in worthless mines in towns such as Rhyolite, Nevada, Bullfrog, Nevada, Wonder, Nevada, Broken Hills, Nevada and Greenwater, California. The L.M. Sullivan Trust Company failed in 1907, and Rice relocated to Reno, Nevada, where he published the Nevada Mining News. He started Nat C. Goodwin & Co. with actor and comedian Nathaniel Carl Goodwin to promote the town of Rawhide, Nevada and its mines. He had writer Elinor Glyn visit to help promote the town.

Through B.H. Scheftels & Company, Rice manipulated the stock of Ely Central Copper Company. He pled guilty to mail fraud in 1911 and went to prison for a year, where he wrote his autobiography. The book was serialized in Adventure magazine, and then published as "My Adventures with your Money" in 1913. He then published the newsletters Industrial and Mining Age, Mining Financial News, Wall Street Iconoclast and Financial Watchtower to promote his mining and oil stocks. In 1920 he was convicted for grand larceny. In 1928 Rice was sentenced to four years in the United States Penitentiary, Atlanta for defrauding investors in a fake copper mine, Idaho Copper Company. In 1931 he was tried for tax evasion, but acquitted.
