= Daveytown, Nevada =

- Ghost town
- Location within Nevada Location within the United States
- Coordinates: 41°17′42″N 117°54′11″W
- Country: United States
- State: Nevada
- County: Humboldt
- Elevation: 4,213 ft (1,284 m)

Daveytown is a ghost town located in Humboldt County, Nevada about twenty four miles north-northwest of Winnemucca and east of the Slumbering Hills. Daveytown is named for the Davey Mine.

Daveytown was an active mining area from 1910 until the 1930s.

In 1938, the Davey Mine was no longer owned by the Davey family and was known as the Mayday Mine. The Mayday Mine had a ten stamp mill and a tailings mill at Daveytown.
