= Tinto (disambiguation) =

Tinto is the highest in the Tinto Hills in southern Scotland.

Tinto may also refer to:

- Tinto River, in south-western Andalusia, Spain
- An area of Honduras sometimes counted as part of the Mosquito Coast
- A fictional city in the computer game series Suikoden
- Tinto Fino, a black grape variety native to Spain
- An alternative name for wines made from the Grenache grape
- Tinto Brass (born 1933), Italian film director and screenwriter
- Paradox Tinto is a studio of Paradox Interactive based in Sitges, Spain

== See also ==
- Rio Tinto (disambiguation)
