= Fairview Peak (Churchill County, Nevada) =

Mountain in the state of Nevada

Coordinates: 39°13′30″N 118°09′10″W

Fairview Peak is a summit in the Clan Alpine Mountains of the U.S. state of Nevada. The elevation is 8,271 feet (2,521 m).

Fairview Peak was so named on account of the scenic views it affords. Variant names were "Fairview Cairn" and "Fairview Mountain". The ghost town of Fairview, Nevada takes its name from the nearby peak.

== 1954 earthquakes ==
A very large earthquake doublet occurred on December 16, 1954. The Dixie Valley/Fairview earthquakes occurred four minutes apart, each with a maximum Mercalli intensity of X (Extreme). The initial shock measured 7.3 M_{w} and the second shock measured 6.9 M_{w}. Damage to man-made structures was minimal because the region was sparsely populated at the time, but oblique-slip motion on a normal fault resulted in the appearance of large fault scarps.

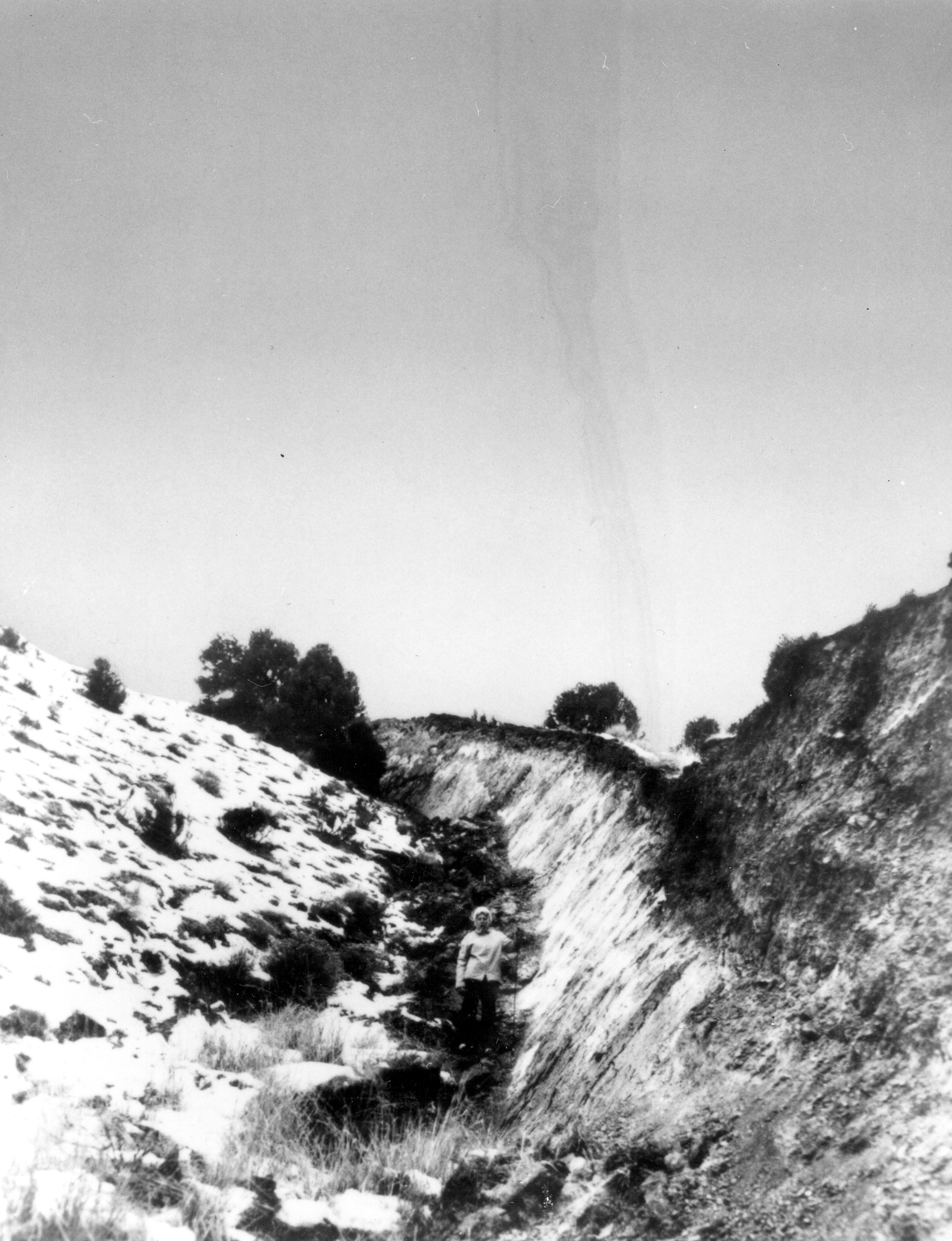
Fault scarp near Fairview Peak, Nev., resulting from the earthquake of December 16, 1954. (Photograph by Hugo Benioff.)
