= Broken Hills, Nevada =

- Ghost town
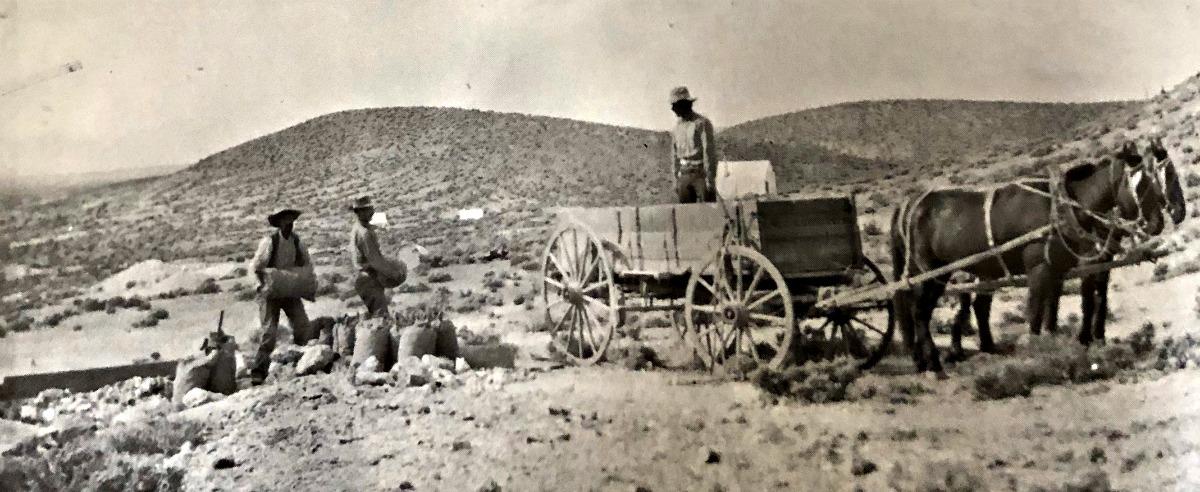

- Location within Nevada Location within the United States
- Coordinates: 39°02′59″N 118°00′37″W
- Country: United States
- State: Nevada
- County: Mineral
- Elevation: 5,371 ft (1,637 m)

Broken Hills is a ghost town in Mineral County, Nevada. It was primarily the site of the mining operation of miners, Joseph Arthur and James Stratford from 1913 to 1920. The settlement reached the height of popularity during World War I.

== History ==
Broken Hills was founded by two Englishmen, Joseph Arthur and James Stratford, who discovered silver-lead ore at the site in 1913. A rush of miners to the area in the following six months was halted when it was discovered that Arthur and Stratford had claimed the most promising sites.

Broken Hills reached the height of population, with a few hundred residents, from 1915 to 1920. The town had stores, a hotel, saloons and a school. By 1920, both Arthur and Stratford's mining efforts only produced US$68,000 (equivalent to $1,093,000 in 2025). Arthur and Stratford then sold their claims to George Graham Rice, who promoted the mine and sold shares of property. Rice invested US$75,000 (equivalent to $1,205,000 in 2025) of stockholder money into the mine to produce only US$7,000 (equivalent to $113,000 in 2025) of revenue. Other mining companies in the area also failed.

In 1926, there was a silver rush to the Quartz Mountains nearby, and the post office and a few stores at Broken Hill reopened. After 1928, the settlement declined again, but mining continued in a limited away. The area produced approximately US$180,000 (equivalent to $4,137,000 in 2025) from 1935 to 1940.

From 1913 to 1920, Broken Hills was primarily an operation of two men: James Statford and Joseph Aurthur. Because they got to the best prospects, the town never really boomed. It held a post office from December 1, 1920, until October 15, 1921. The post office was in operation from December 1920 until October 1921 and then from June 1926 until February 1935.

The population was 12 in 1940.

== In popular culture ==
The town is referenced in the popular video game Fallout 2. A post-apocalyptic version of the town appears in the game.
