= Dun Glen, Nevada =

Dun Glen (Chafey)
- Ghost Town
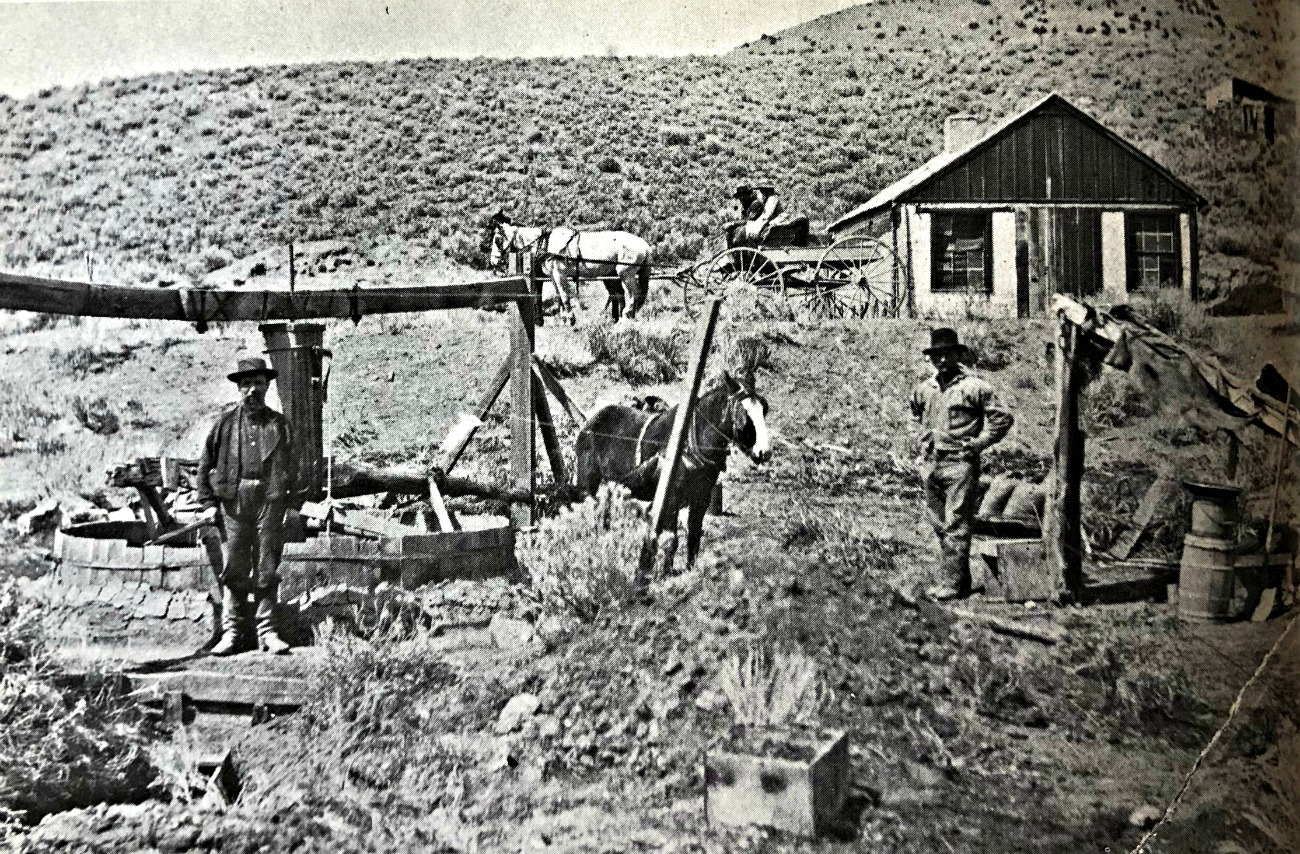

- Location within Nevada
- Coordinates: 40°44′31″N 117°55′19″W
- Country: United States
- State: Nevada
- County: Pershing

Dun Glen (later Chafey) is a ghost town in Pershing County, Nevada, United States, 9 miles northeast of Mill City. Established in 1862, the mining camp soon became one of the largest towns in northern Nevada. By 1880, mining had declined and the town was abandoned. With a silver discovery in the area in 1908, the settlement attracted people and was re-named Chafey. Chafey was abandoned when mining operations stopped in 1913.

== Dun Glen ==
In 1862, Dun Glen was established after silver was discovered in the area. The site was named for one of its early settlers, Angus Dun. By 1863, the mining camp became a commercial center with a population of 250. It was the second largest commercial district in northern Nevada. Early on it was variously called Dunn Glen or Dunglen. However its post office, opened on July 18, 1865 was called Dun Glen, and it operated as such until April 7, 1894.

In 1863 the Sierra Mining district was formed 10 miles northeast of Mill City, with Dun Glen as its business center. In 1863 and 1865 to 1866, at the town's request, a small army garrison was stationed at Camp Dun Glen within the town to protect the miners from Indians in the early part of the Snake War. Dun Glen in the 1860s was one of the largest towns in northern Nevada. By the 1870s it had three stamping mills, but by 1880 mining declined and the population also had declined to 50 persons, supported only by the local cattle ranching in the area. Chinese miners attempted drift mining of the gold laden placer gravels between 1880 and 1890 with limited success due to the water table. By 1894, Dun Glen was nearly deserted.

== Chafey ==
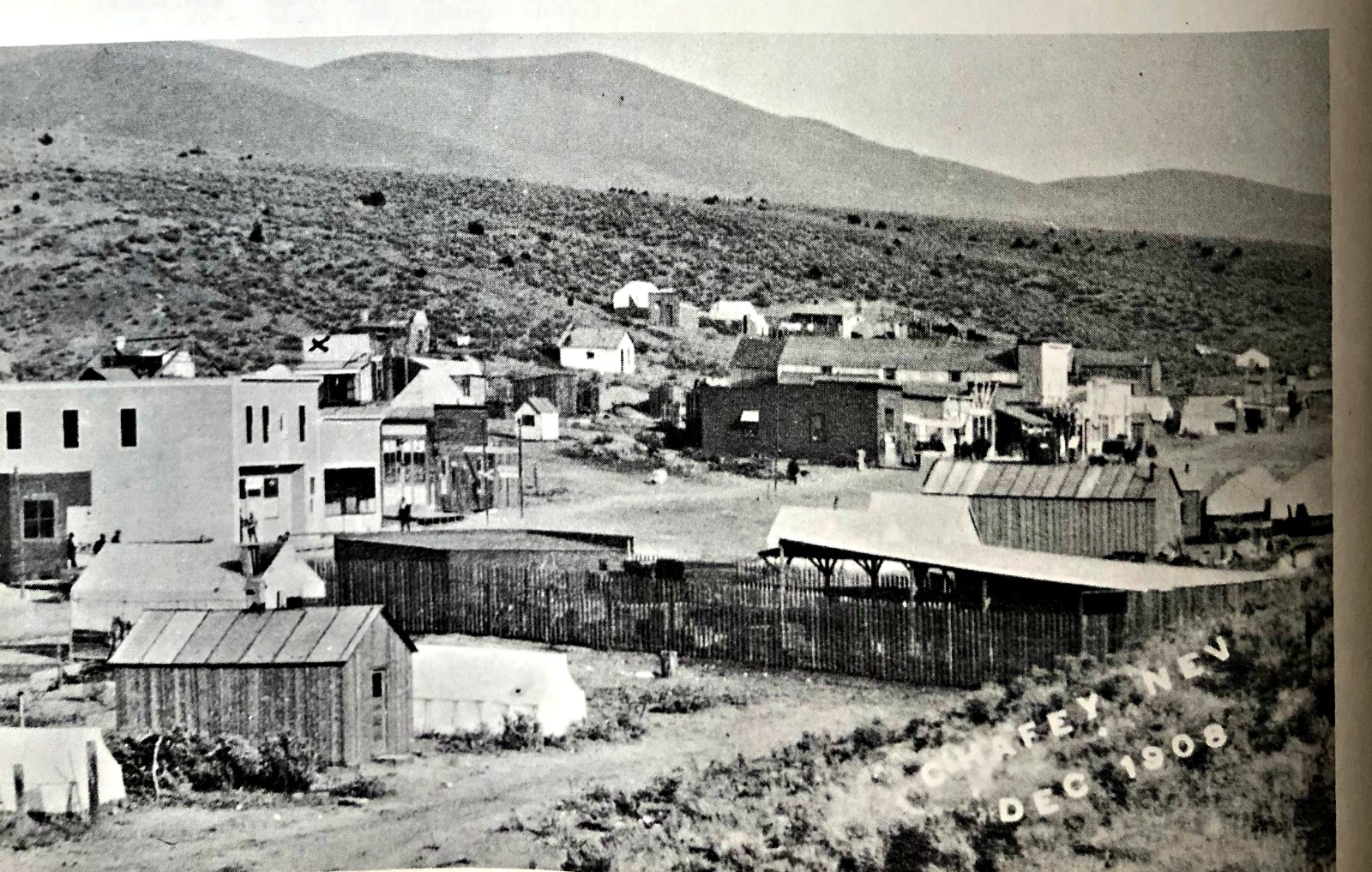
The town of Chafey, 1908

The discovery of silver in the area in 1908 resulted in the creation of a new larger city, Chafey, with a population of 1000 persons, larger than the former town of Dun Glen. Chafey was named after E. S. Chafey, owner of the Chafey Mine. The Chafey post office operated from August 4, 1908 to March 4, 1911, when it was changed to Dun Glen. On April 15, 1913, the post office closed with service transferred to Mill City, when mining operations ceased, and the population again declined and the town was again abandoned.

== Remnants ==
Little is left of the old towns except deteriorated stone foundations and mill foundations.

== See also ==
- List of ghost towns in Nevada
