= Slumbering Hills =

Mountain range in Nevada, United States

- Location within Nevada

Highest point
- Elevation: 1,772 m (5,814 ft)

Geography
- Country: United States
- State: Nevada
- District: Humboldt County
- Range coordinates: 41°13′49.646″N 117°59′28.506″W
- Topo map: USGS Silver State Draw

The Slumbering Hills are a mountain range in Humboldt County, Nevada.
