= Lander, Nevada =

- Ghost town
- Location within the state of Nevada Lander (the United States)
- Coordinates: 40°19′59″N 116°42′23″W
- Country: United States
- State: Nevada
- County: Lander
- Elevation: 5,355 ft (1,632 m)
- Time zone: UTC-8 (Pacific (PST))
  - Summer (DST): UTC-7 (PDT)
- GNIS feature ID: 847387

Lander is a ghost town in Lander County in Nevada in the United States. The site is approximately 24 miles southeast of Battle Mountain.

== History ==
The town of Lander was established in the 1870s. Early silver mines include the Silver Side, Grey Eagle and Lovie. In 1883 there were 100 people in Lander. Several mills were built in that year and were open until 1885 when mills were closed. Ore extraction was waning and stopped by 1890. Only temporary efforts were made after that year but a school was built in 1889 and was open until 1898 serving Lander and also Utah Mine camp and Mud Springs. In 1905, Charles Montgomery discovered gold 2 miles to the southeast of Lander, which became the site of Tenabo, Nevada. In the summer of 1906 several were newly opened and were working. Lander had a post office from October 1906 until October 1909. By 1907 Lander reached its peak with 75 residents. However the good times finished when mines were abandoned. Lander became in a ghost town and was abandoned in 1921.
