= Rawhide, Nevada =

Mining settlement, now ghost town

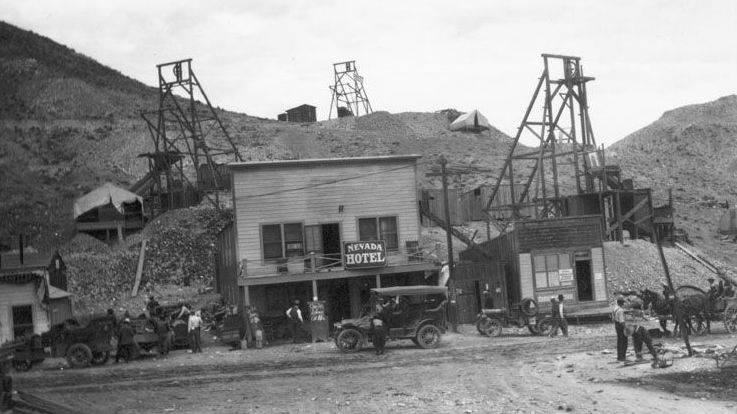
Rawhide, circa 1915

Rawhide was a town in Mineral County, Nevada, approximately 55 miles (88.5 km) southeast of Fallon. The site of Rawhide has been dismantled by recent mining activity, with little or nothing remaining to be seen.

== History ==
In December 1906, prospector Jim Swanson made a discovery of a rich gold and silver deposit in the hills near what became Rawhide. He was soon joined by Charles ("Charley") B. Holman and Charles ("Scotty") A. McLeod, who also found sizeable deposits nearby on Hooligan Hill. McLeod had recently been ordered to cease prospecting around the nearby camp of Buckskin, and bitter about this, he suggested the name of Rawhide for the new camp, as a play on the name of the Buckskin camp he held with contempt. Word spread, and both Holman and McLeod sold their claims to investors and moved on to Stingaree Gulch later in 1907, where they found yet another large deposit. The two men sold these claims for even more money, and then left the area to prospect elsewhere.

The frenzy that these claims created soon had Rawhide booming. Investors began selling stocks at a frenetic pace, and the town soon had a population of about 5,000, with: three banks, four churches, a school, twelve hotels, twenty-eight restaurants, a theater, and thirty-seven saloons. While the original mines and claims did produce a decent profit in gold and silver, the fever created an amount of activity far in excess of what the mines could support. Stock swindlers like George Graham Rice , a flashy con-artist from Goldfield, plied their trade, creating a sense that Rawhide would be the next Virginia City (or the like of any number of other Nevada boom towns), with untold riches to be had for the savvy folks who would just invest in his companies. Others, like businessman George "Tex" Rickard came to Rawhide to establish legitimate businesses, and make money off the boom while it lasted. Rawhide's hey-day was short-lived; the glaring, gross over-promotion which manipulators performed to inflate the worth of Rawhide doomed its chance for success from the start.

In the short span of two years the town went from its peak population of 7,000 people (March to June, 1908), to fewer than 500 people by the latter part of 1910. Helping push the decline of the town even further along was a disastrous fire which swept through Rawhide in September 1908, along with a flood in September 1909, from which many people did not recover or rebuild. While the original mines worked out the last of the gold and silver from the veins first discovered by Swanson, Holman, and McLeod, people began to leave the area, moving to the next “big thing”. While there remained a few people eking out a life working in the mines, or processing the ore, or just working their own claims and prospecting, for all intents and purposes the town became a hollow shell of what it once was.

The population was 32 in 1940.

By 1941, only a few hardy souls were left in Rawhide, and the post office was officially closed. After that point, more and more of the few remaining residents of Rawhide began to drift away, and by the 1960s, Mrs. Anne Rechel was considered the only true resident of Rawhide (except for on again / off again workers when mining activity resumed on occasion). She continued living in Rawhide until circumstances forced her to leave in the late 1960s, at which point Rawhide languished, truly becoming a ghost town. Visitors between the years of 1967 to the early 1980s could still find standing buildings in Rawhide, including Mrs. Rechel's house, an old Lumber Store (which had been moved to Rawhide from the town of Wonder, Nevada), and several other standing buildings.

The stone jail house of Rawhide was moved eventually to Hawthorne for safekeeping, where it remains today. Additionally, a small cemetery was still visible near Stingaree Gulch, a mile (1.6 km) north of town. However, new mining technologies for obtaining fine gold particles from ore deposits, and an upswing in gold prices, brought renewed interest to the Rawhide area in the late 1980s. A large mining operation (The Denton-Rawhide Mine), operated jointly by Kennecott Minerals and Pacific Rim Mining Corp. created a huge open pit mine, which completely over-ran the original site of Rawhide. The mine wound down operations in 2002-2003, and the pit itself has been permitted for use as a landfill; however the landfill is not in operation yet (as of March 2008). Visitors to the area will find nothing remaining of what was once Rawhide.

== Location ==
The location of Rawhide is approximately 55 miles S-E of Fallon, NV and approximately 35 miles (56.3 km) N-E of Hawthorne, NV. As mentioned above, the Rawhide-Denton Mine has removed any trace of Rawhide, and there is nothing of the town left to see.

Rawhide was at 39°01′00″N 118°23′28″W, at an elevation of 5,082 feet (1,549 m).

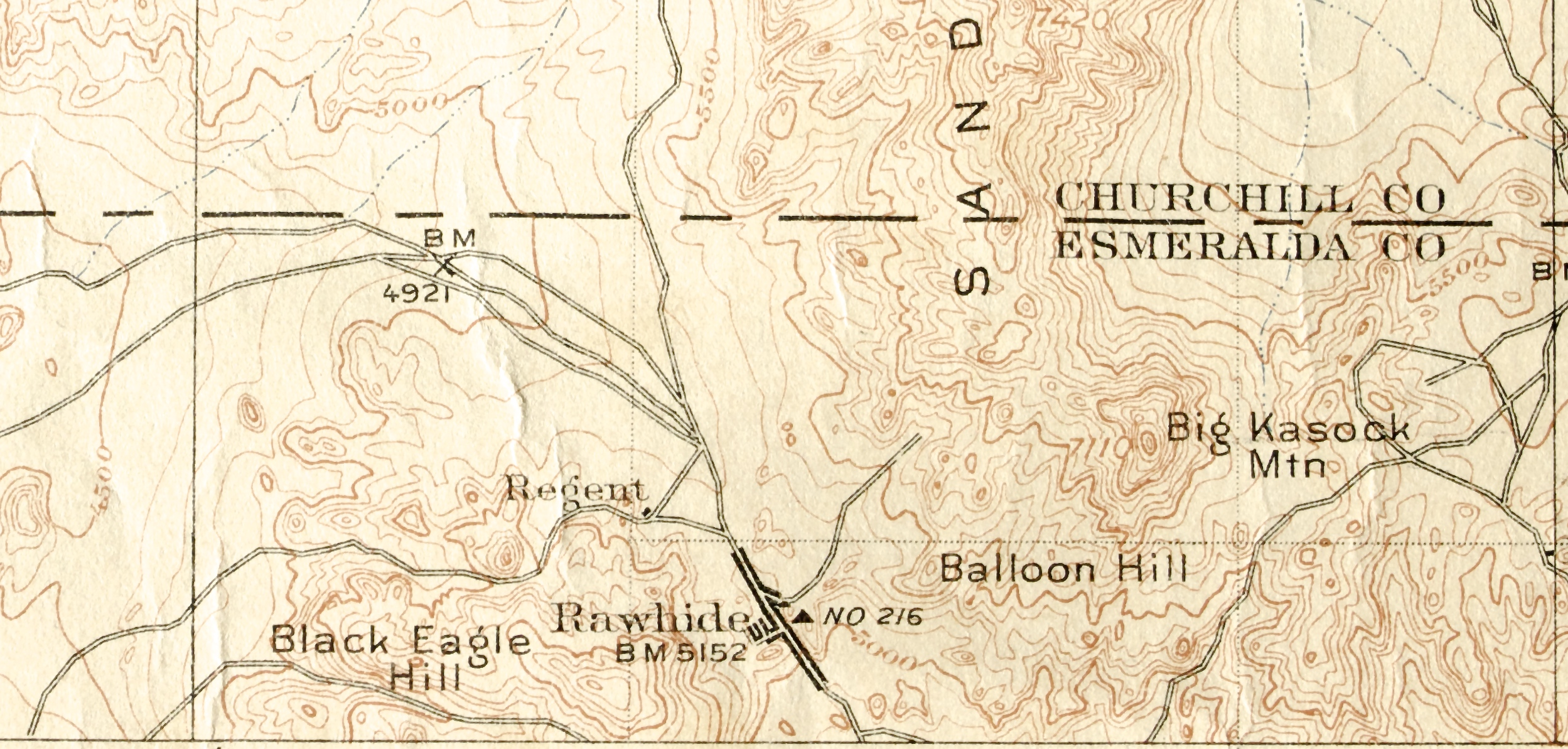
Detail from 1:250000 USGS map of Rawhide, then located in Esmeralda County, Nevada in 1910

== See also ==
- List of ghost towns in Nevada

== Photo Gallery ==
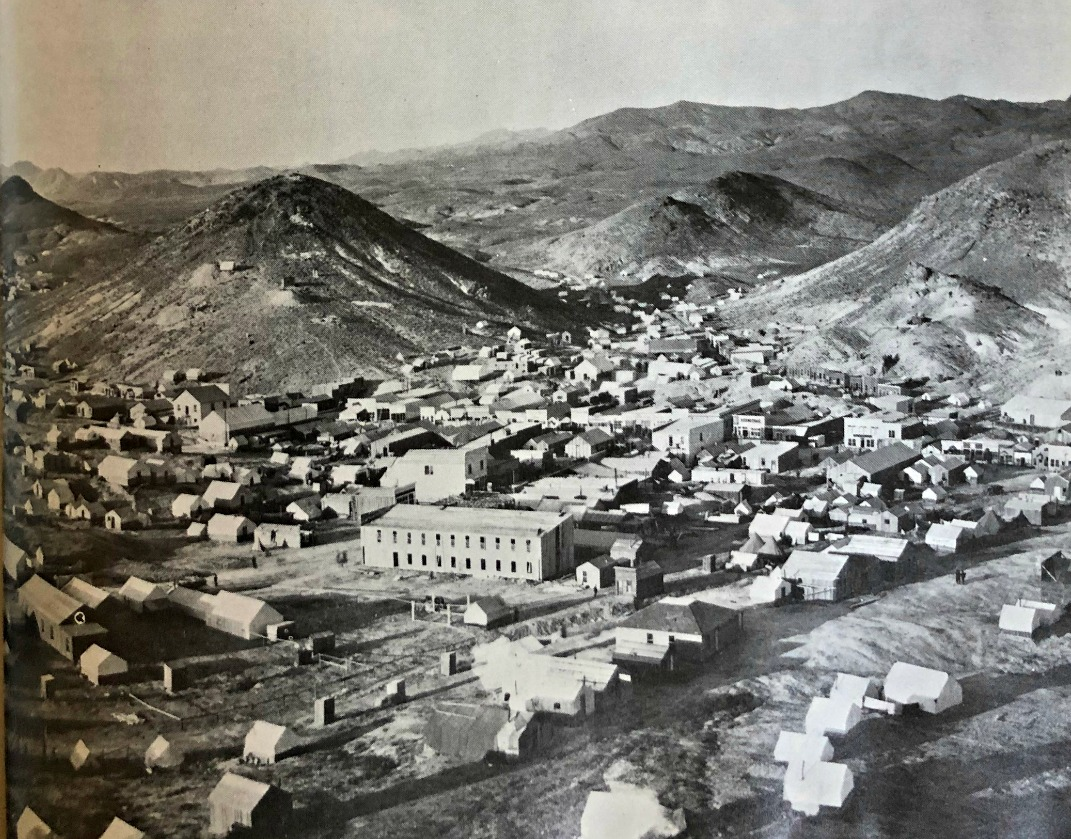
Rawhide, 1908

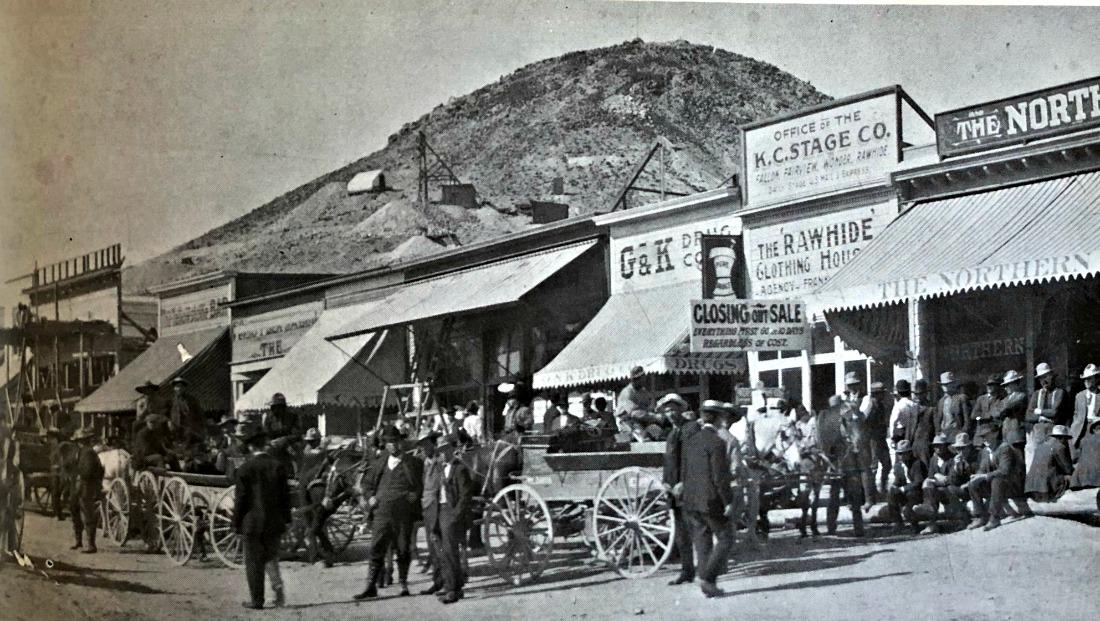
Rawhide busy street, 1908

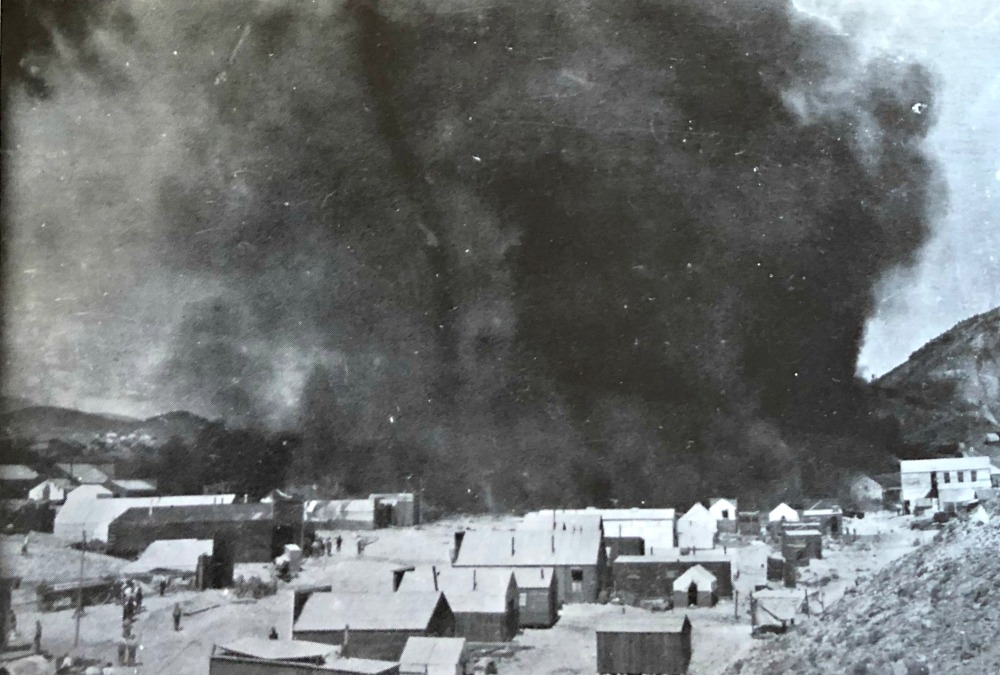
Rawhide fire, Sept. 1908

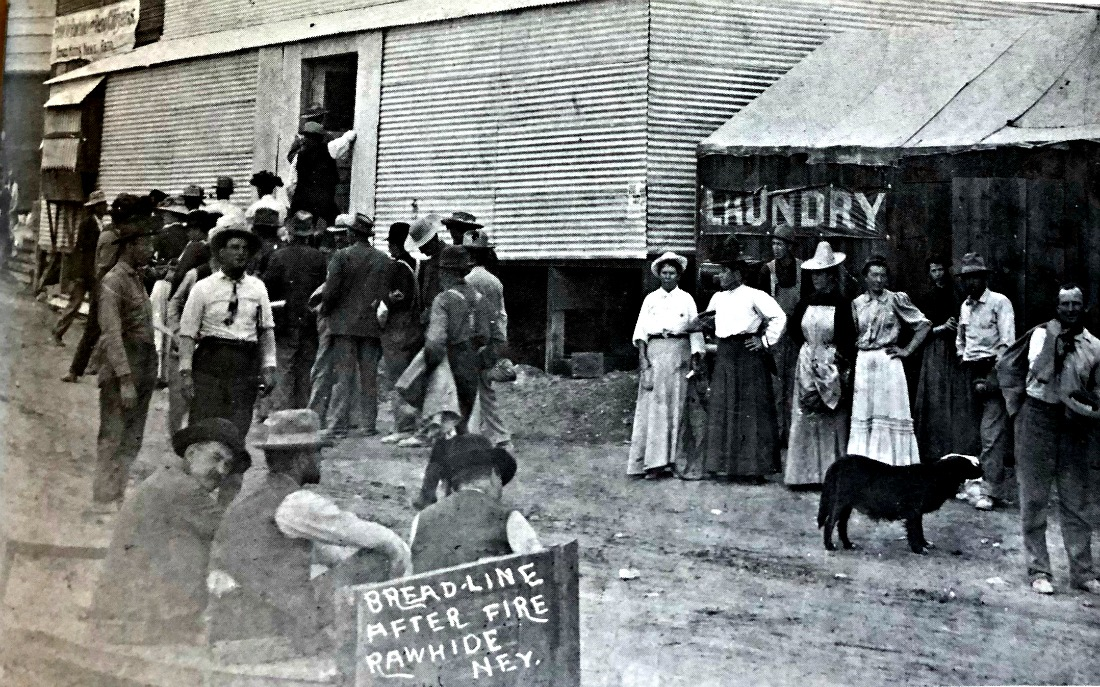
Rawhide post-fire bread line, 1908
