= Belmont Courthouse State Historic Park =

Historic courthouse in Nevada, US

Belmont Courthouse
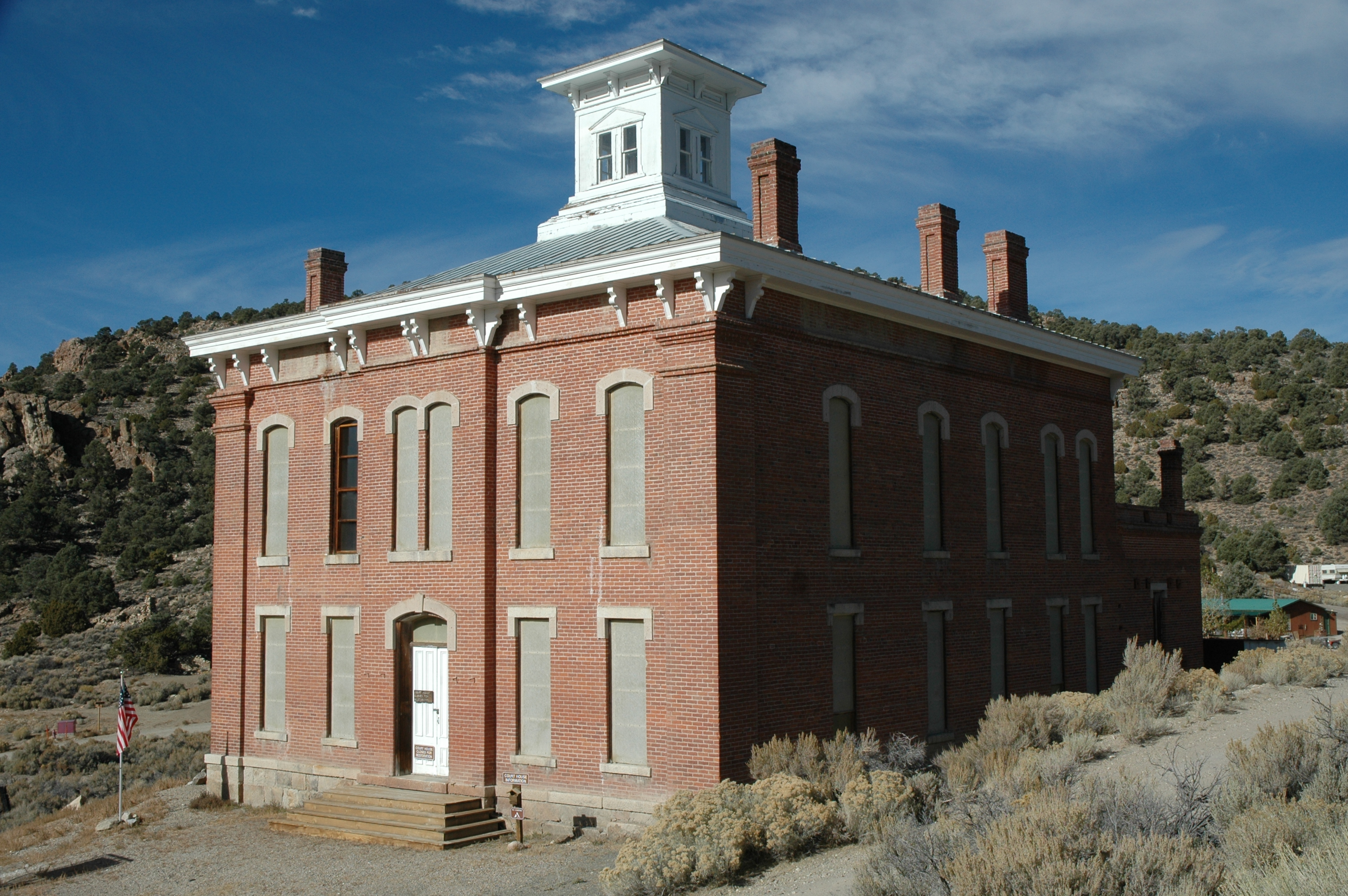
- Old Nye County Courthouse in Belmont, Nevada

- Location within Nevada
- Location: Nye, Nevada, United States
- Coordinates: 38°35′47″N 116°52′34″W
- Elevation: 7,392 ft (2,253 m)
- Established: 1974
- Governing body: The Friends of the Belmont Courthouse

Belmont Courthouse is in the Toquima Range of Nye County. It is located in the ghost town of Belmont, 45 miles (72 km) northeast of Tonopah, Nevada.

The partially restored courthouse, which is open to the public, was built in 1876. Most of the restoration was completed by Brett Perchetti. It was the seat of Nye County government until 1905. There are limited picnic tables and public toilets available in Belmont; however, picnic and camping facilities are available at the U.S. Forest Service Pine Creek Campground in the Monitor Valley, located 20 miles (32 km) north of Belmont.

The Courthouse was deeded to the Nevada State Parks in 1974 and transferred to Nye County in 2012.
