= Cactus Springs, Nye County, Nevada =

Ghost town in Nevada, United States

Cactus Springs
- Ghost Town
- Location within Nevada
- Coordinates: 37°32′09″N 116°52′58″W
- Country: United States
- State: Nevada
- County: Nye
- Founded: 1901; 125 years ago
- Named for: Cactus and Spring

Cactus Springs is a ghost town in Nye County, Nevada. It is currently within the boundaries of the Nellis Air Force Range.

Activity began in 1901 with the discovery of turquoise on Cactus Peak. Silver was discovered nearby in 1904, and by 1910 the Lincoln Gold Mining Company had constructed a small camp near its holdings called Camp Rockefeller.

Activity in the Cactus Range ended by 1935 and the camp never had a population greater than approximately 50 persons.
