= Pine Grove, Virginia =

Unincorporated community in Virginia, US

Coordinates: 38.53596°N 78.48001°W

Pine Grove is an unincorporated community in Page County, in the U.S. state of Virginia.
