= Rio Tinto, Nevada =

- Ghost town
- Location within the state of Nevada Rio Tinto (the United States)
- Coordinates: 41°48′34″N 115°58′37″W
- Country: United States
- State: Nevada
- County: Elko
- Elevation: 6,050 ft (1,844 m)
- Time zone: UTC-8 (Pacific (PST))
  - Summer (DST): UTC-7 (PDT)

Rio Tinto is a ghost town in Elko County, Nevada in the United States.

== History ==
Rio Tinto was one of the last mining boom towns. It was named after the prosperous copper mines in Andalusia, Spain that produced ore for 3,000 years.. The discovery of copper mines near Rio Tinto is credited to Franklyn Hunt, who had explored in the west for many years. Hunt had found traces of copper a few miles from Mountain City, Nevada. He had claimed his discovery, but no one except the brothers Walt and Jack Davidson had enough faith in Hunt to grub stake him. For years, Hunt predicted that ore would be found at 250-foot (76 m). He found copper in 1932. This information spread and started a rush in the area, including creation of the town. Rio Tinto was not affected by the onset of World War II. The decline of the mine began after the end of the war: the price of copper had decreased and the mine became unprofitable. All operations had ceased by 1948 and Rio Tinto quickly became a ghost town. The post office, started in 1936, was discontinued in February 1948. Some cleanup was done, and many of the old buildings were moved. Nowadays what remains are a few houses and the school (the largest building).
