= Fairview, Nevada =

Ghost town in Churchill County, Nevada, United States

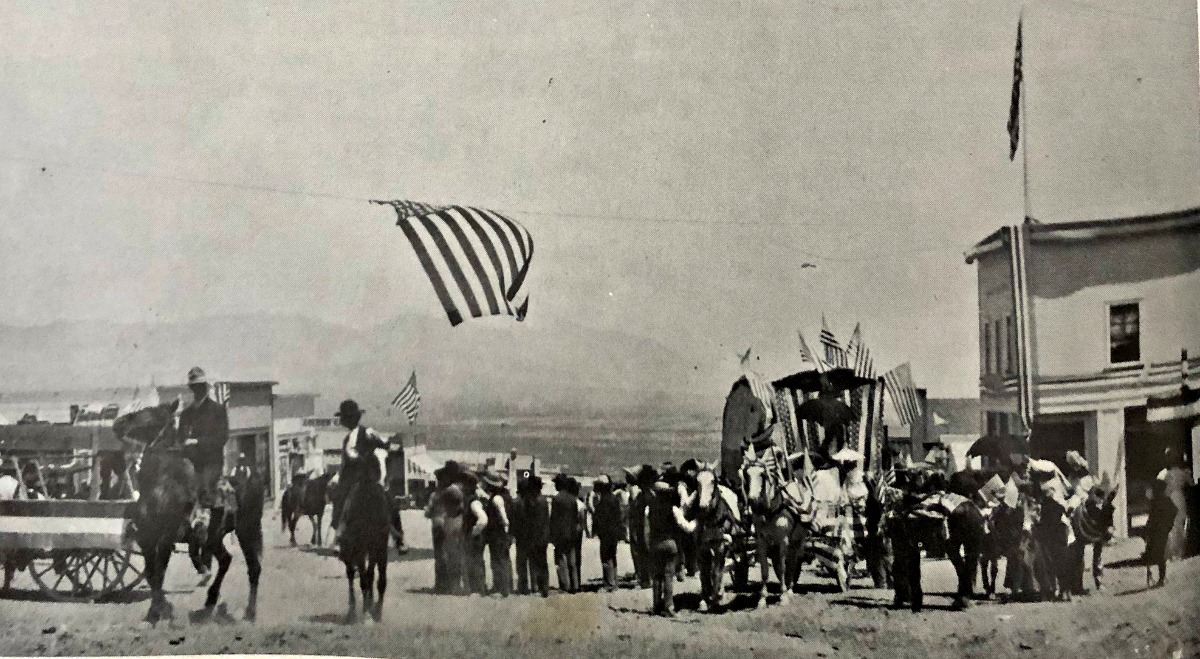
- 1906 Fourth of July parade in Fairview

- Location within Nevada Location within the United States
- 39°15′59″N 118°11′51″W

Nevada Historical Marker
- Reference no.: 202

Fairview is a ghost town in Churchill County, Nevada, United States.

== History ==
Discovery of silver in the area in 1905 led to several claims and the creation of a boom town in 1906. Some of the first mining claims were bought by George Nixon and George Wingfield, which helped drive the boom. The community took its name from Fairview Peak. Fairview changed locations twice, once to move closer to the mines and mills in which the town's residents worked, and once because the town outgrew the narrow canyon in which the second town was sited.

From 1906 to 1907, the mining camp's population expanded dramatically. Fairview had multiple hotels, banks, assay offices, 27 saloons, a newspaper, post office, a union hall and a population of 2000. After 1908, outside interest in the mining camps and town declined, and the newspaper closed. The town stayed prosperous until 1912, and afterwards was abandoned.

Fairview had a post office from April 1906 through May 1919. Fairview appears on maps as a stop or station for the Pony Express. The location of the station is about 5.7 mile north of the site of Fairview.

Fairview is currently a ghost town. One of the few remnants of the old town is the bank vault from the first town site's bank; the vault can be seen from the nearby Austin-Lincoln Highway.

== 1954 earthquakes ==
A very large earthquake doublet occurred on December 16, 1954. The Dixie Valley/Fairview earthquakes occurred four minutes apart, each with a maximum Mercalli intensity of X (Extreme). The initial shock measured 7.3 M_{w} and the second shock measured 6.9 M_{w}. Damage to man-made structures was minimal because the region was sparsely populated at the time, but oblique-slip motion on a normal fault resulted in the appearance of large fault scarps.

== Gallery ==
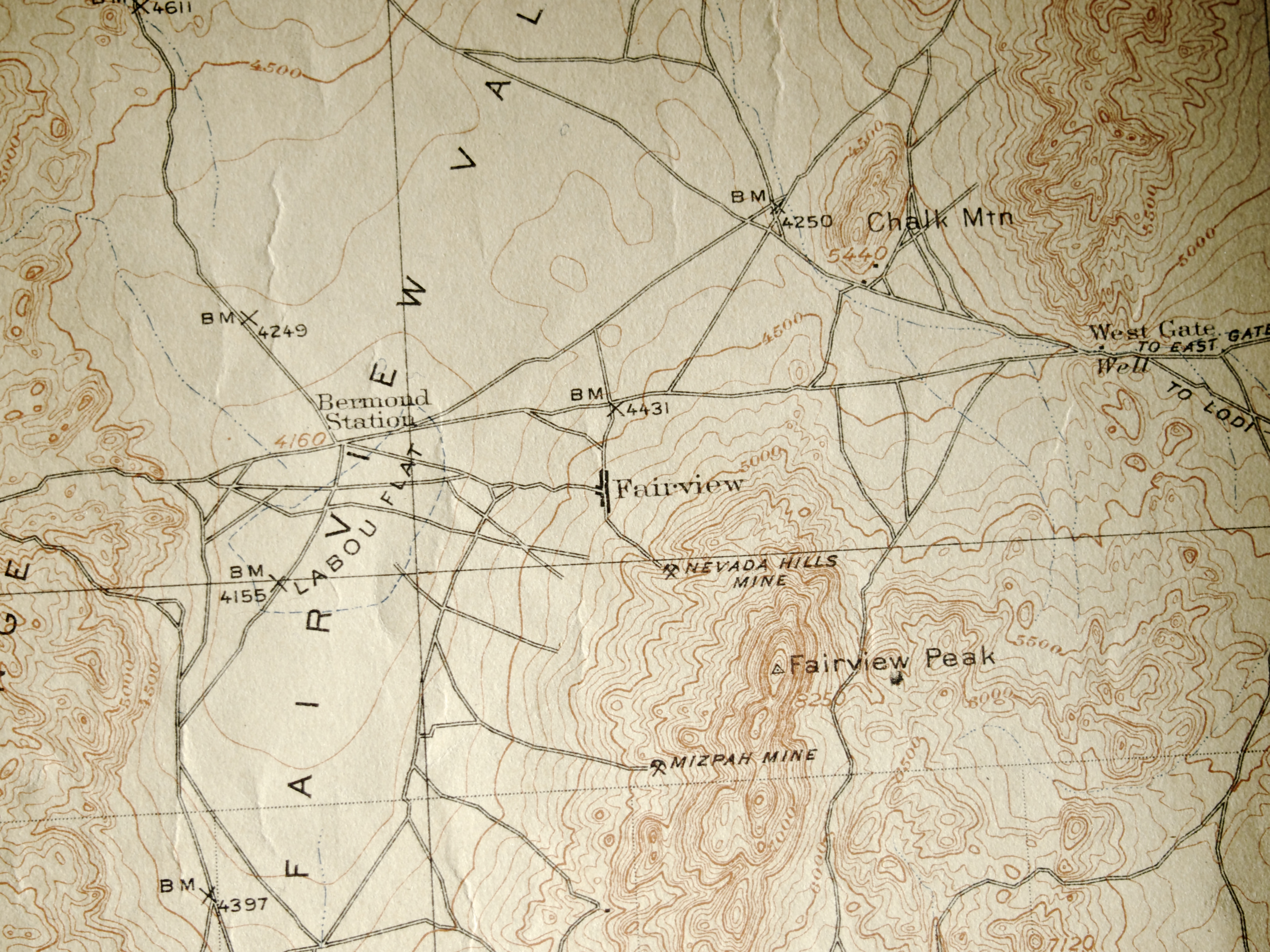
Churchill county map, 1910

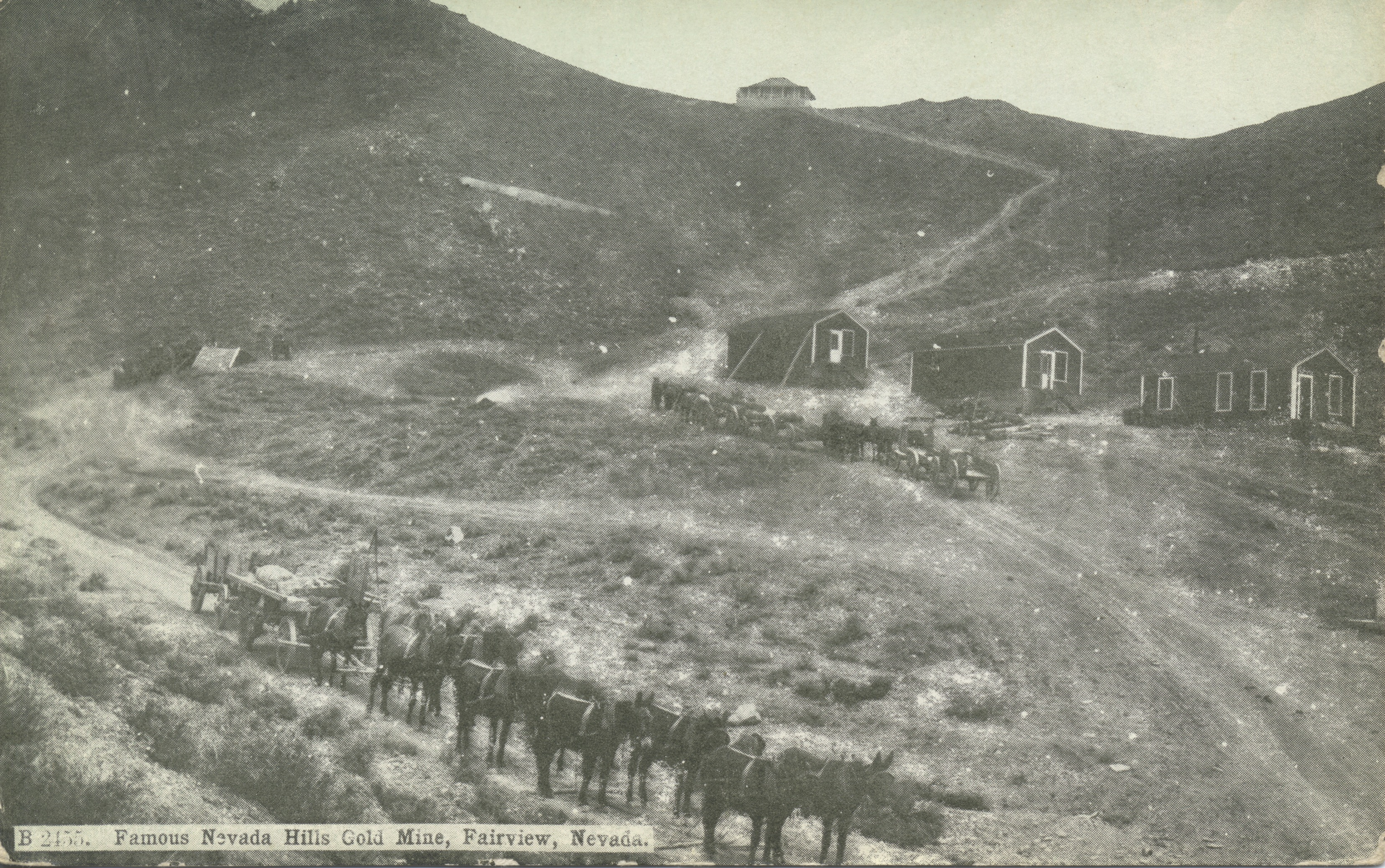
Transporting ore by wagon, Fairview, c 1906

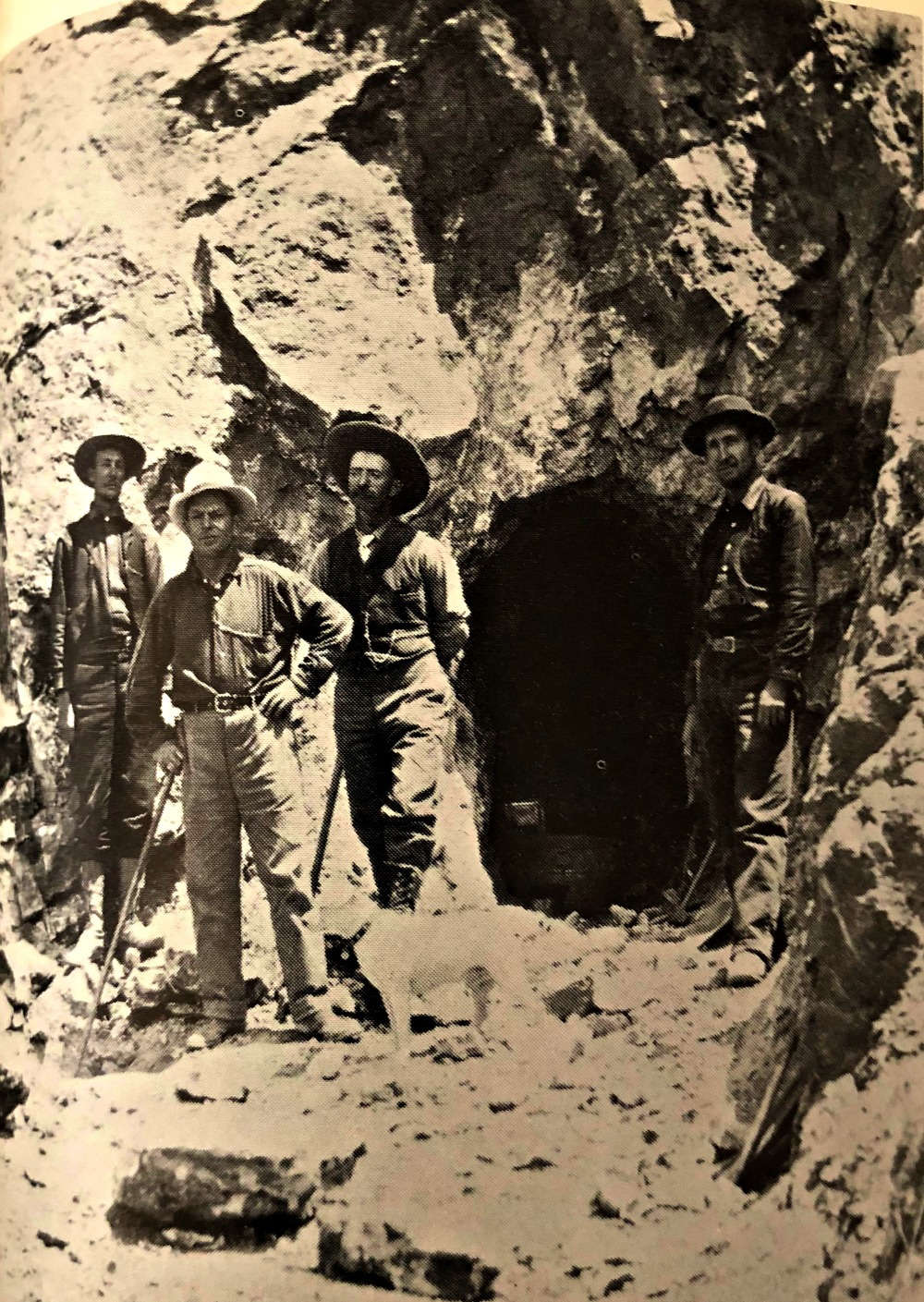
Prospectors examining mine near Fairview, c 1906

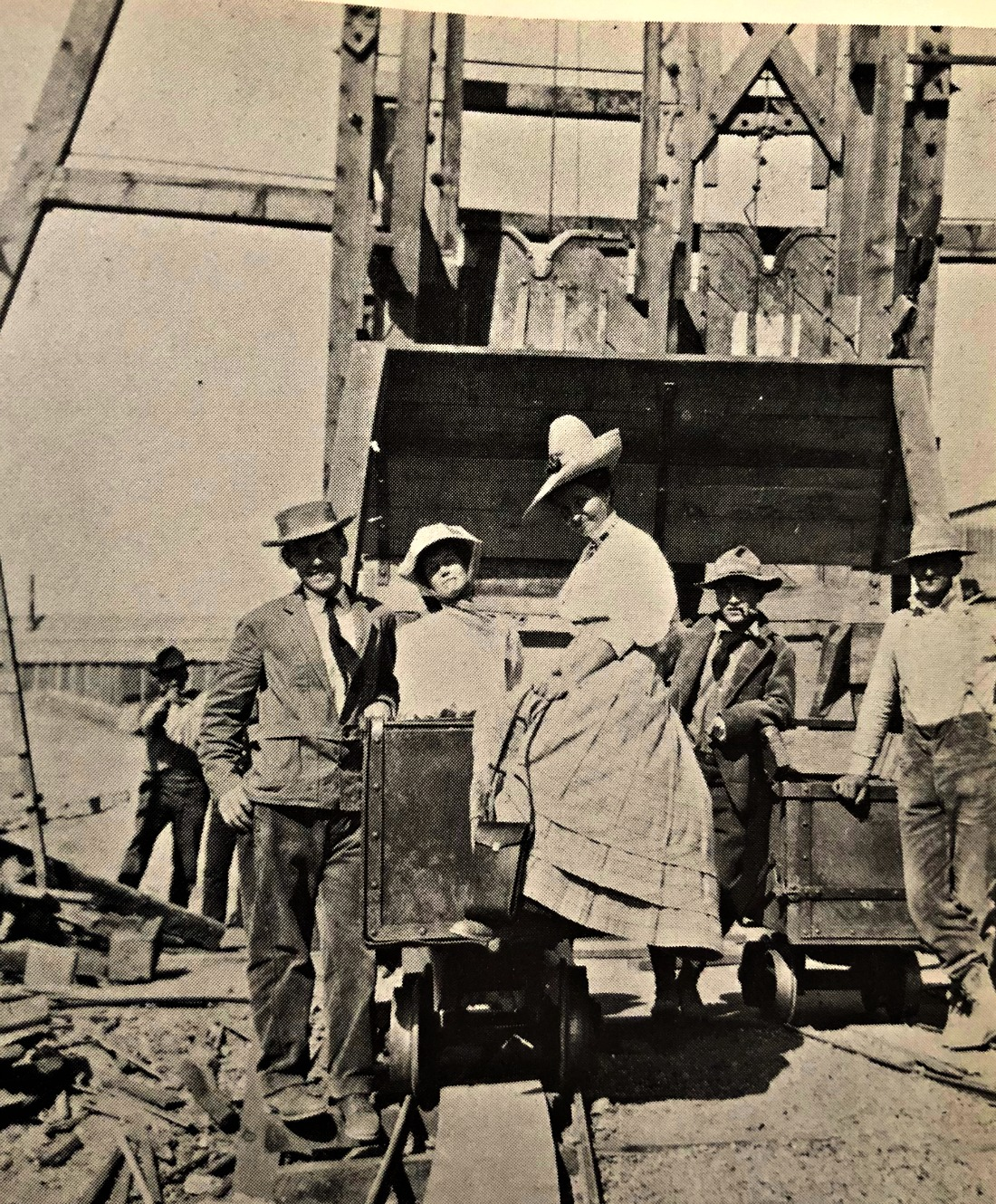
Fairview mine visitors, c 1906

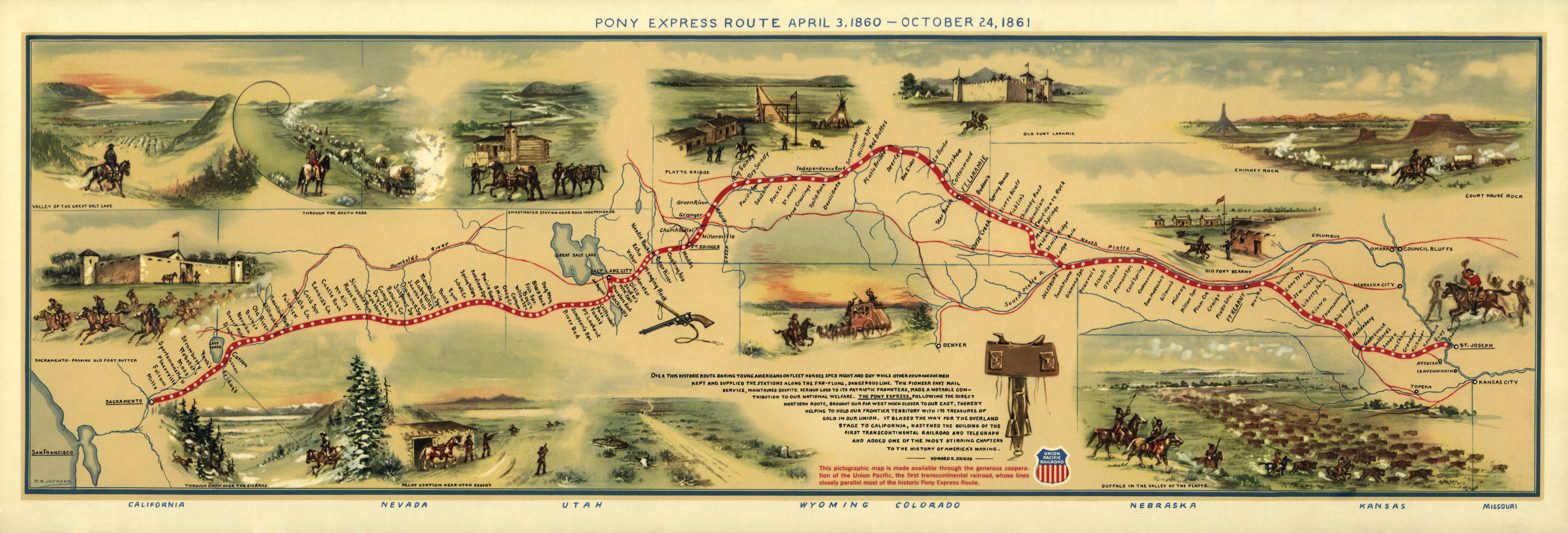
Fairview a stop on the Pony Express route

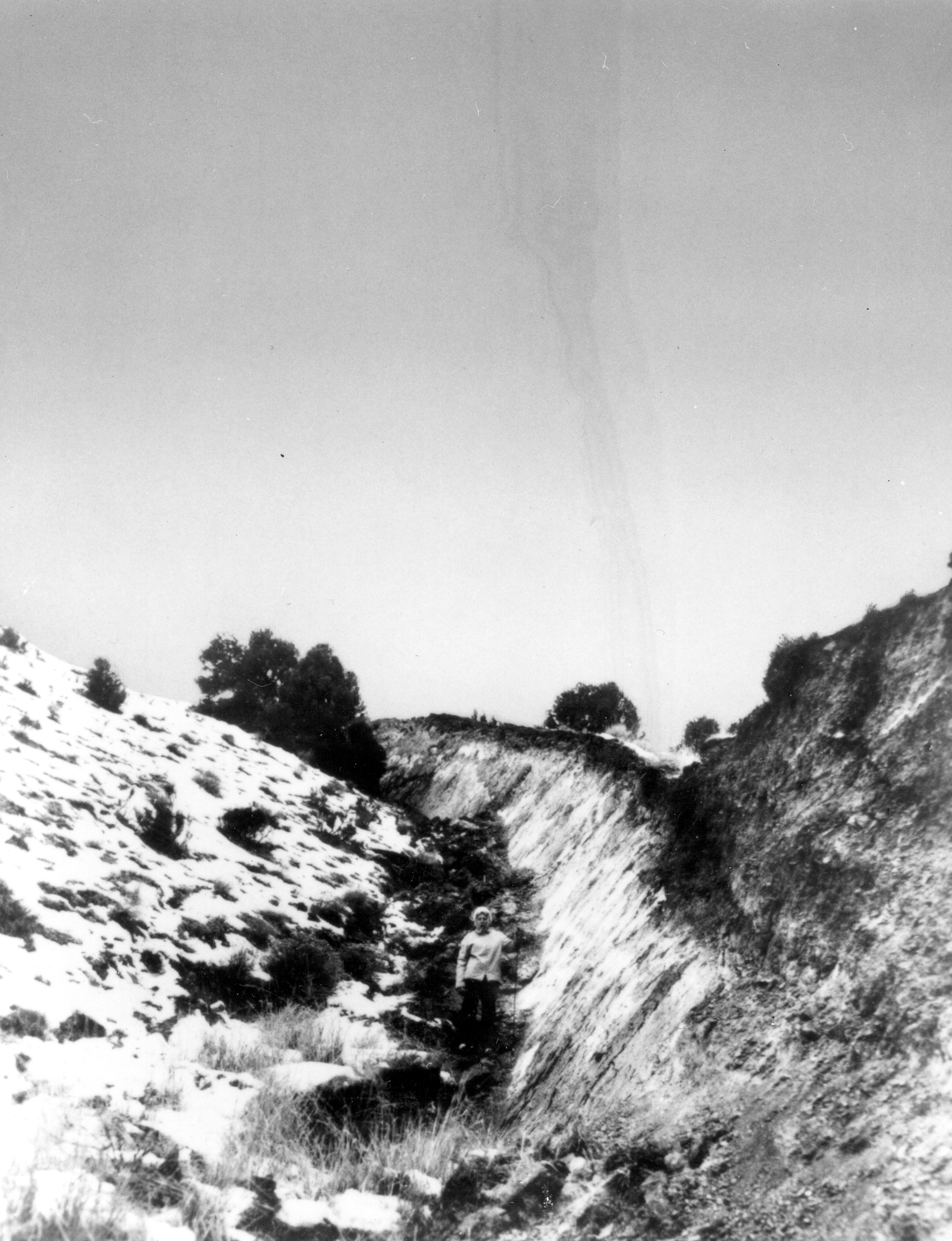
Fault scarp near Fairview Peak, Nev., resulting from the earthquake of December 16, 1954. (Photograph by Hugo Benioff.)

== See also ==
- List of ghost towns in Nevada
