= White Plains, Nevada =

Ghost Town in Nevada, United States

- Ghost Town
- Location within Nevada
- Coordinates: 39°54′25″N 118°49′04″W
- Country: United States
- State: Nevada
- County: Churchill County

White Plains is a ghost town in Churchill County, in the U.S. state of Nevada.

== History ==
Mining began in the area in 1864, when a mill was built to process silver ore for nearby mines. The community was named after a nearby white plain, which was descriptively named for its abundant soda deposits. Variant names were "White Plains Station" and "Whiteplains".

The mill closed a short time later due to the scarcity of fuel and water. The settlement was reestablished after 1870, when salt deposits were found in the area. In the early 1870s, the Desert Crystal Salt Company built a plant to recover salt thru solar evaporation. During the 1870s, 200 tons of salt were processed at the salt plant and shipped to silver mining districts in eastern Nevada.

A post office and telegraph office were established at White Plains in 1879, and remained in operation until it was discontinued in 1909.
