= Pine Grove, Nevada =

- Ghost town
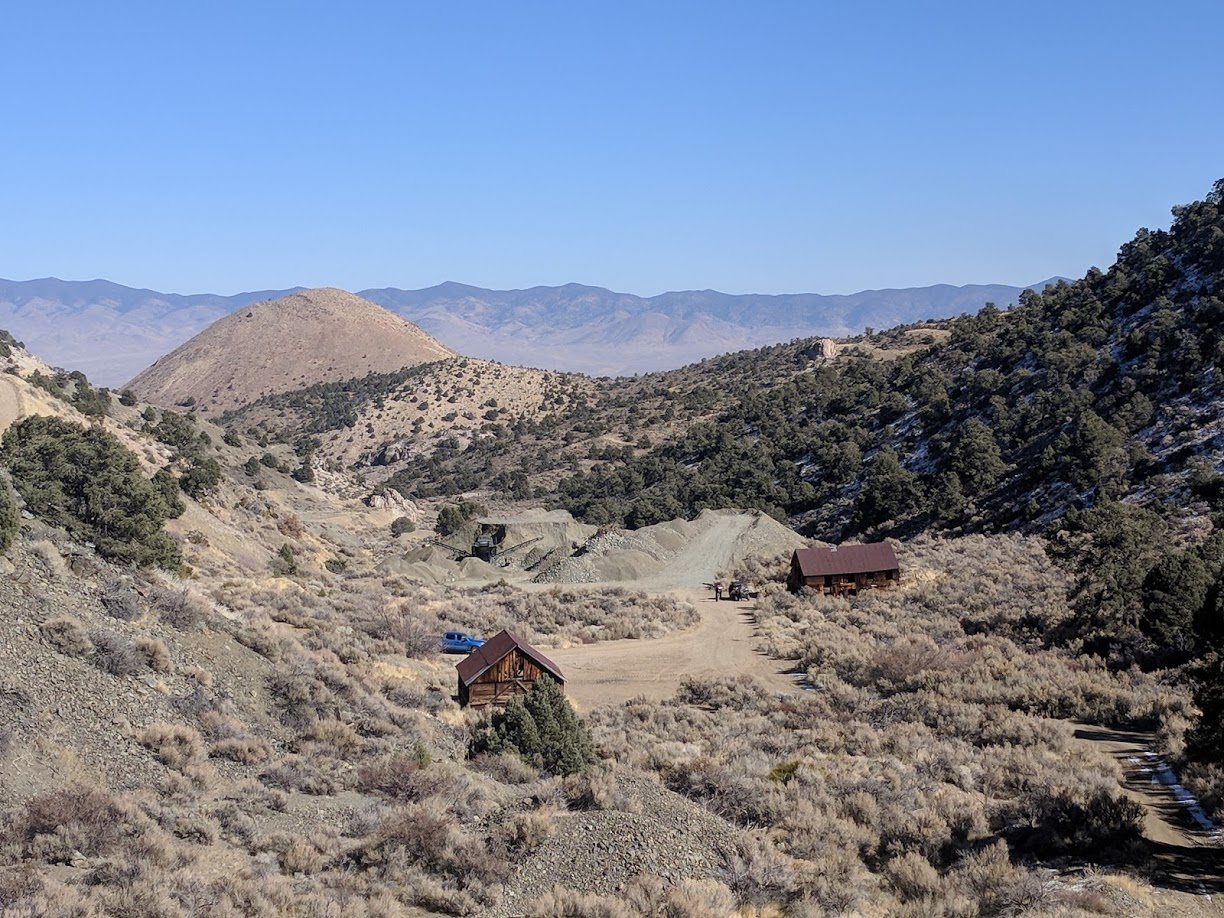
- Pine Grove, Nevada

- Location within Nevada Location within the United States
- Coordinates: 38°40′42″N 119°07′27″W
- Country: United States
- State: Nevada
- County: Lyon
- Established: 1866
- Elevation: 6,716 ft (2,047 m)
- Time zone: UTC-8 (Pacific (PST))
  - Summer (DST): UTC-7 (PDT)

Pine Grove is a ghost town in Lyon County, Nevada, United States.

== History ==
In 1866, gold-bearing rock was discovered in the area by William Wilson. The Wheeler Mine was established in the next year. Early settlers named the camp after the nearby Pine Grove Hills.

By 1868, a post office had opened, along with a weekly newspaper. The population at the time was 200. Two steam-powered stamp mills were built along with three arrastras, which processed silver and gold ore. The camp reached its peak in population in the early 1870s with 600 residents.

The settlement, at its height, was divided into five sections and was spread out for a mile. It offered five saloons, three hotels, multiple stores, blacksmith shops, a dance hall, barber shops, a school, livery stable and two doctors' offices. Pine Grove was a regional supply center. Two mill expansions were made in 1882, and mining was robust in the 1880s. After the economic depression in the U.S. in 1893, mine production was slowly abandoned.

Work started again in the mines between 1900 and 1910, but production never reached the activity of the 1870s and 1880s. There was limited prospecting in the area in the early 1900s, but all mining had ceased by 1918. The remaining town residents left Pine Grove by the 1930s.

== Gallery ==
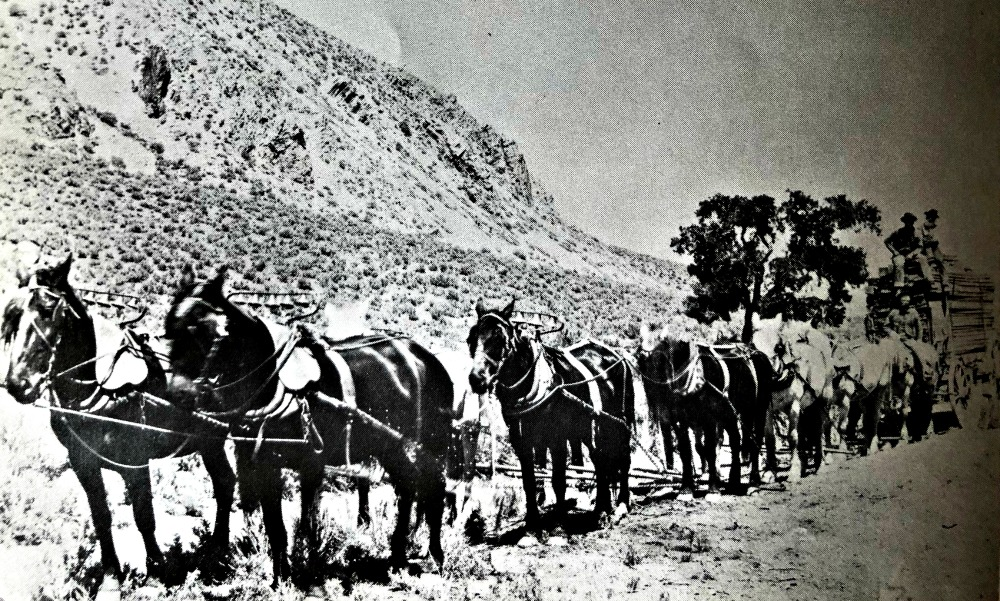
Twelve horse team, Pine Grove, 1880

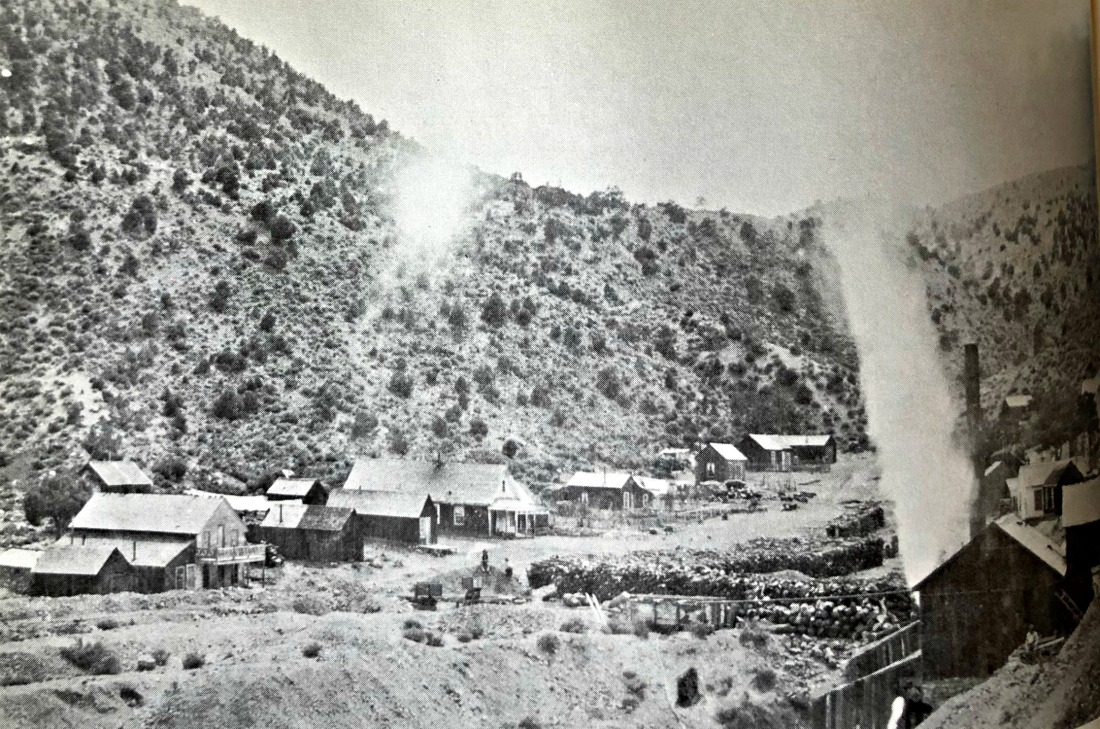
Pine Grove, 1880

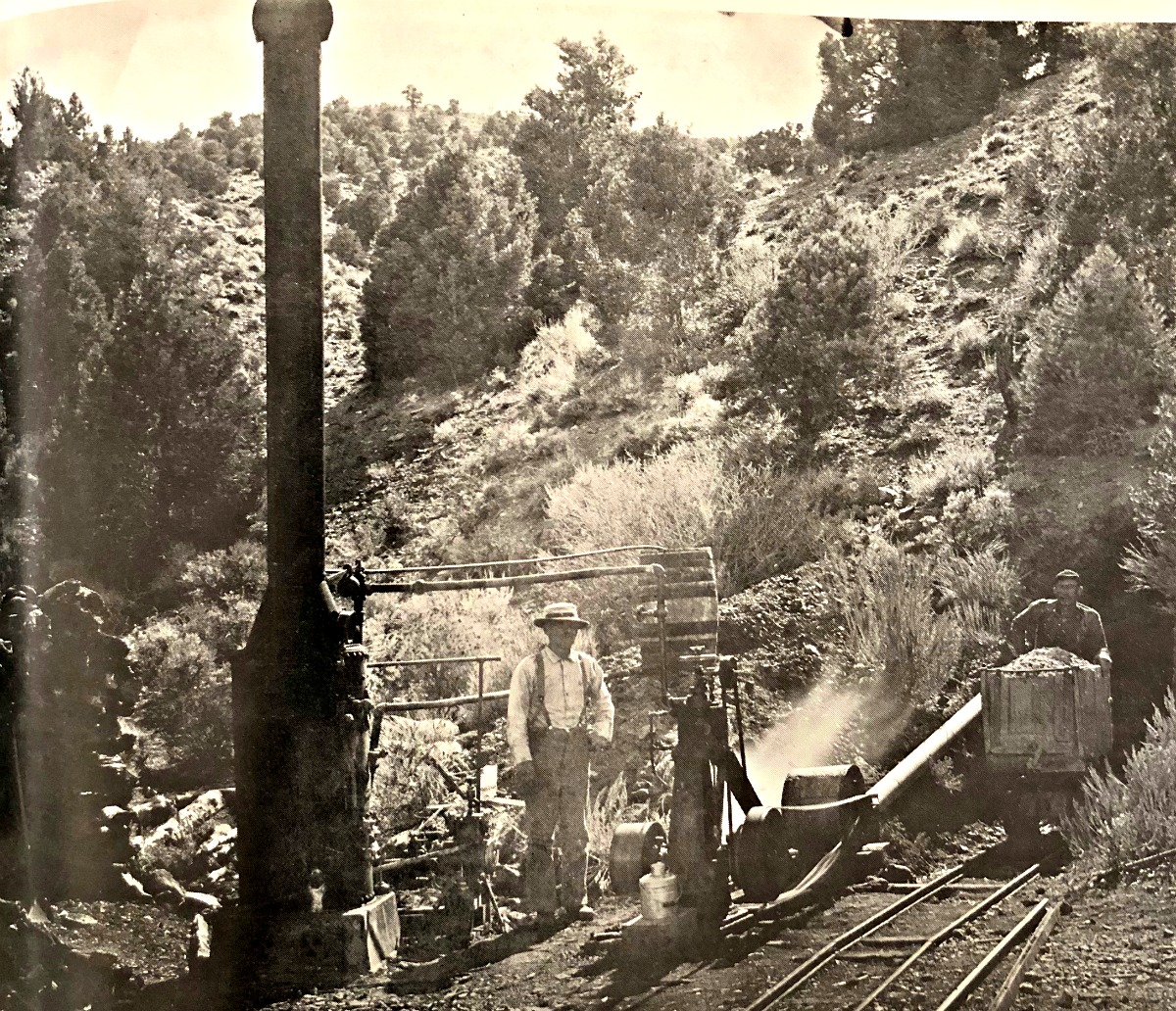
Primitive steam boiler, Pine Grove, c. 1880

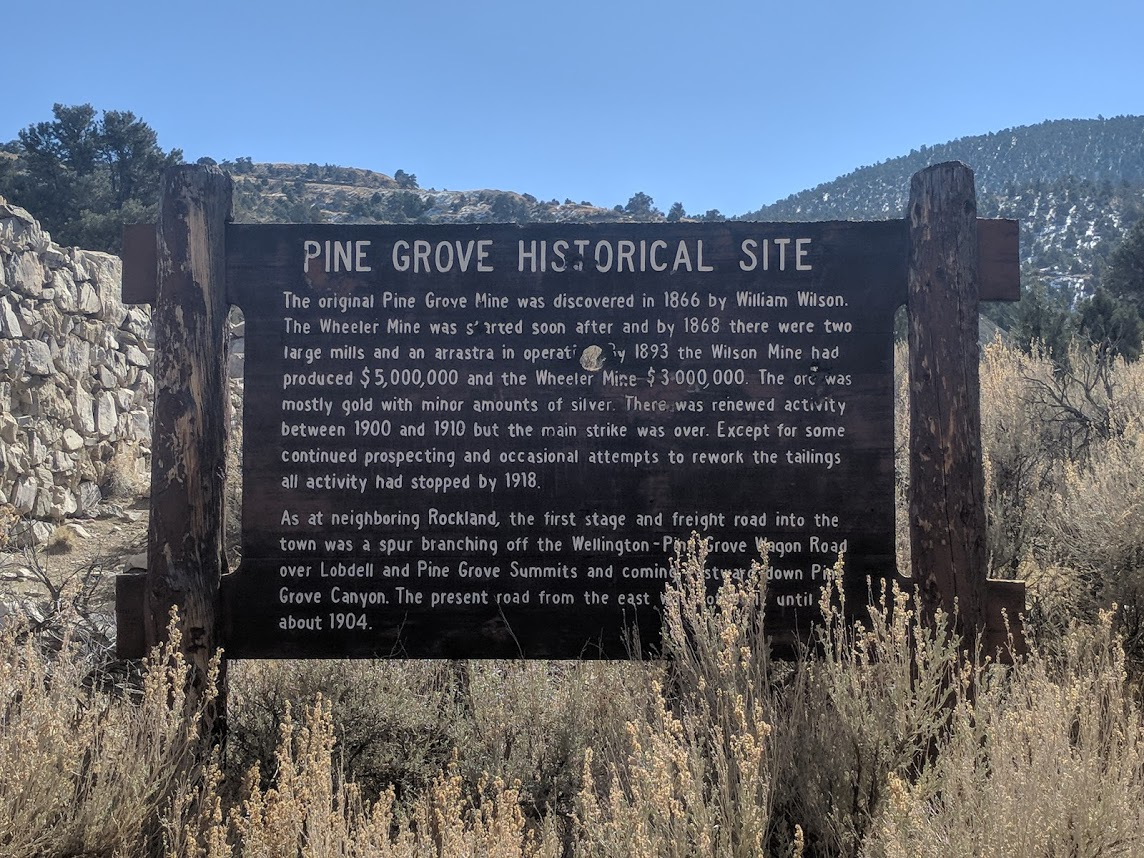
Historical marker, Pine Grove ghost town

== See also ==
- List of ghost towns in Nevada
