= Wonder, Nevada =

Ghost town in Nevada

- Ghost Town
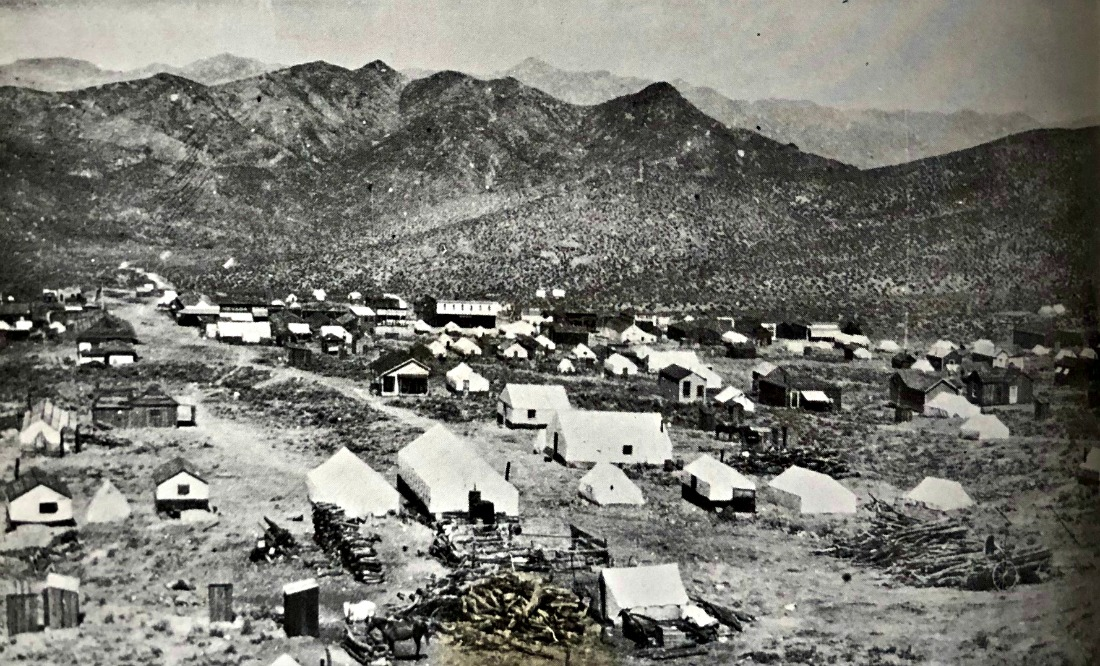

- Location within Nevada Location within the United States
- Coordinates: 39°26′22″N 118°03′11″W
- Country: United States
- State: Nevada
- County: Churchill County
- Elevation: 5,853 ft (1,784 m)

Wonder is a ghost town in Churchill County, Nevada, approximately 39 miles (63 km) east of Fallon.

== History ==
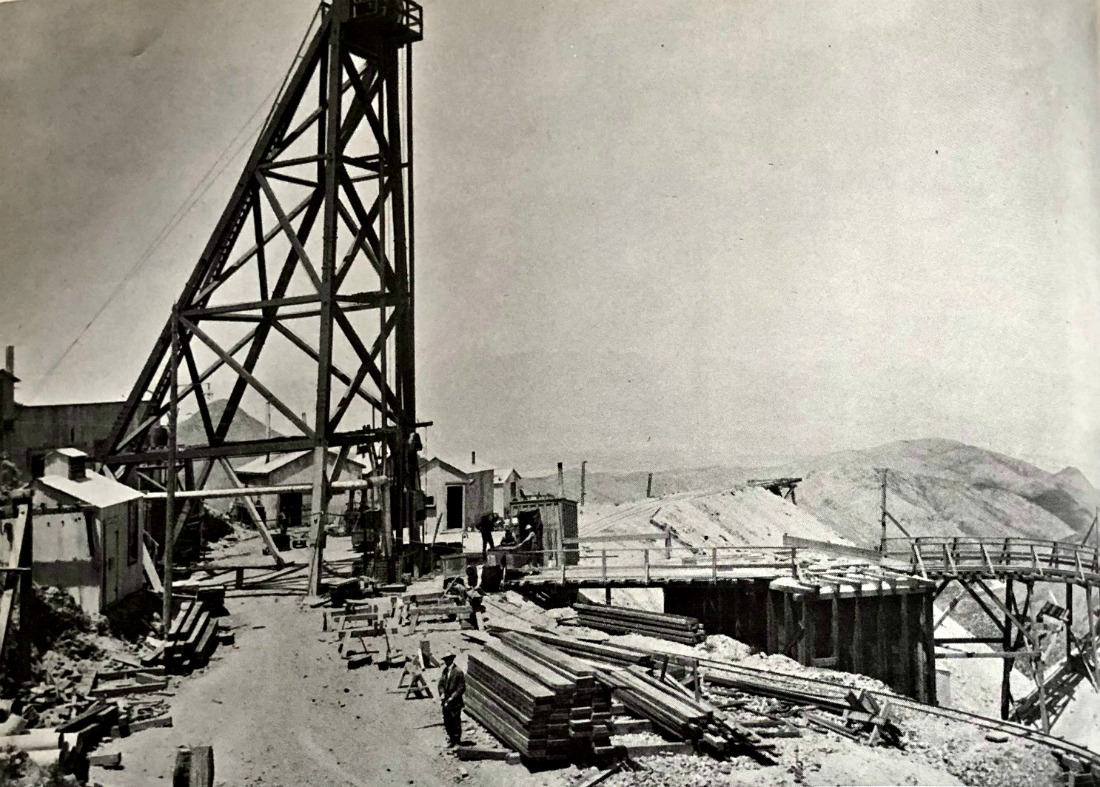
Wonder Mine 1907

Wonder was established in May 1906 when prospectors from the town of Fairview discovered rich quartz veins in a dry wash north of Chalk Mountain. As was typical of the era of the 'second' silver rush in Nevada, hundreds of people soon flocked to the site, and the town of Wonder was born.

A newspaper, the Wonder Mining News, began delivering issues by August, and in September 1909 the town had its own post office. By the fall of 1906, Wonder was going full-bore; it had a stage line connecting it to both Fairview and Fallon, and the usual assortment of stores, assay offices, freight depot, restaurants, hotels, boarding houses, and- of course- saloons. Several mining concerns were formed in Wonder, but the highest yield operation was the Nevada Wonder Mining Company. Backed by capital from eastern concerns, its operations produced the largest yields in silver and gold from the mines, and in 1913 a large mill was built onto the hillside just to the east of the town, were the ore was soon being processed.

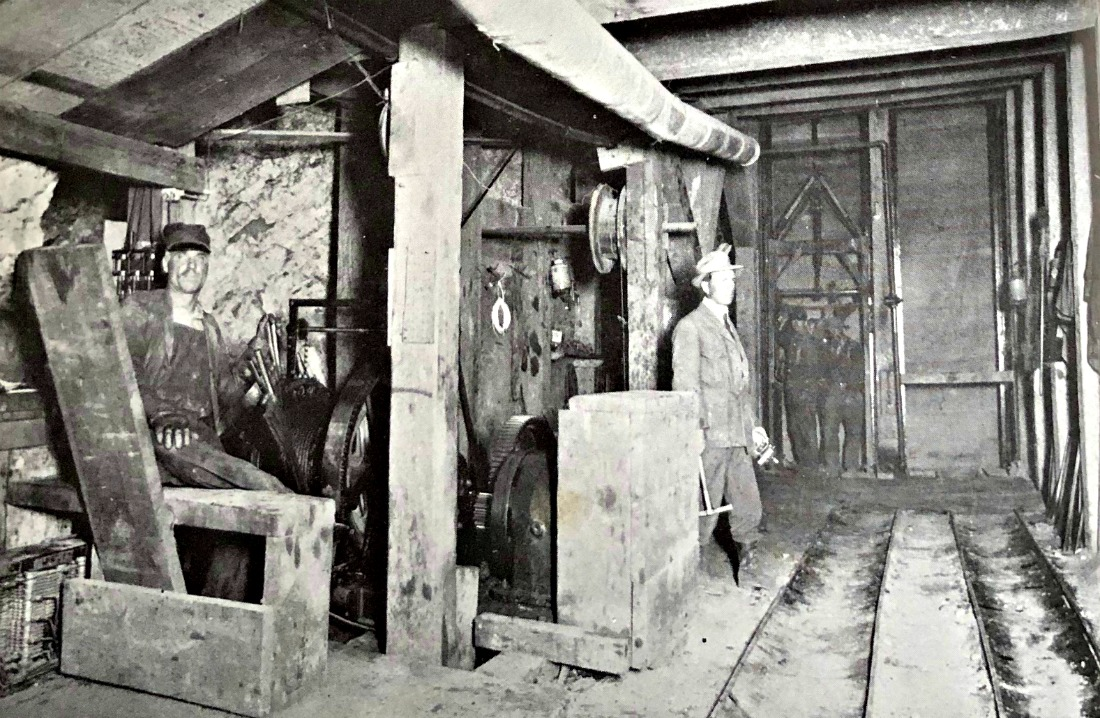
Lowest level of Wonder mine, 1907

For the better part of 11 years, Wonder was an active and bustling mining town, but the veins in the mines did not go on indefinitely, and by 1919 they had played out, and the town began to slowly slide into obscurity. In August 1920, the post office was closed. Many of the buildings themselves were torn down to be moved on to other mining camps. Those that did remain crumbled over the years as the harsh Nevada winters and summers took their toll. There was a brief resurgence in mining activity in the 1930s (although nowhere near the same as had occurred earlier), but it was short-lived.

== Location ==
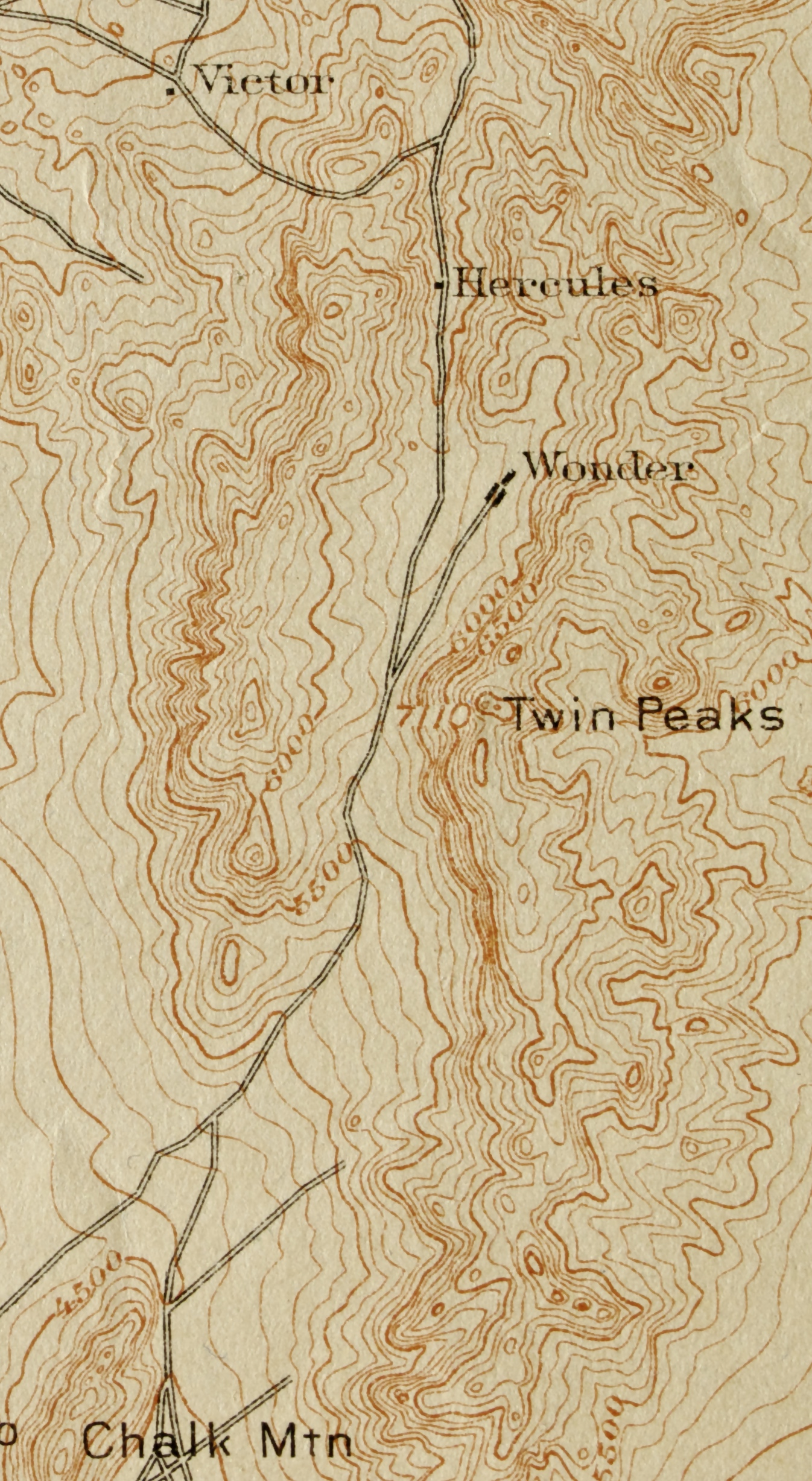
Detail of 1910 map, with area surrounding Wonder

Today the site of Wonder can be reached by taking a dirt road off the Dixie Valley road, which is off US 50 East heading east from Fallon. The site of Wonder is recognizable by the remains of the large mill which can still be found on the hillside east of town, and some scattered wood remains in the valley where the town site was. Several depressions of foundations for buildings which once stood may also be found.

One should be extremely careful while exploring the area, as open pits leading down into old mine shafts present a hazard for falling. While some pits may have fences that mark such dangerous cavities, many have fallen into disuse, leading to possible injury.

== Mineral deposits ==
The gold and silver veins of Wonder consist mostly of quartz, adularia (a hydrothermal feldspar) and brecciated volcanic rock. The ore minerals, which are contained mostly as fine disseminations within the veins, include acanthite (silver sulfide), gold and several silver halides. Wonder is classified as a low-sulfidation (adularia-sericite) epithermal deposit. The veins were deeply oxidized, and there was some secondary enrichment; both of these factors made the Wonder veins more economical to mine.
