= Pinegrove Township, Pennsylvania =

Township in Pennsylvania, US

Coordinates: 41°22′35″N 79°29′29″W

- Township
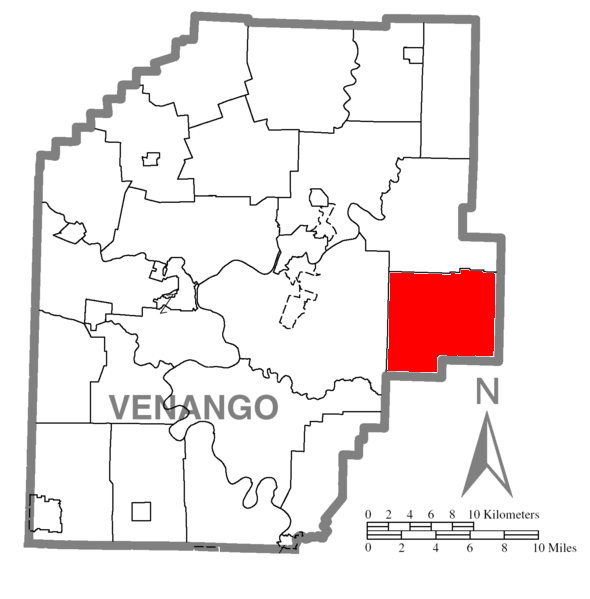
- Map of Venango County, Pennsylvania highlighting Pinegrove Township

- Map of Venango County, Pennsylvania
- Country: United States
- State: Pennsylvania
- County: Venango
- Settled: 1805
- Incorporated: 1824

Government
  - Type: Board of Supervisors

Area
  - Total: 37.02 sq mi (95.88 km^{2})
  - Land: 37.02 sq mi (95.88 km^{2})
  - Water: 0 sq mi (0.00 km^{2})

Population (2020)
  - Total: 1,328 ▼
  - Estimate (2024): 1,328
  - Density: 34.7/sq mi (13.38/km^{2})
- Time zone: UTC-5 (Eastern (EST))
  - Summer (DST): UTC-4 (EDT)
- Area code: 814
- FIPS code: 42-121-60472

Pinegrove Township is a township in Venango County, Pennsylvania. The population was 1,328 at the 2020 census, a decrease from the figure of 1,354 in 2010, which was an increase over the tabulation of 1,338 as of the 2000 census.

== Geography ==
According to the United States Census Bureau, the township has a total area of 37.0 square miles (95.9 km^{2}), all land.

== Demographics ==
Historical population
| Census | Pop. | Note | %± |
|---|---|---|---|
| 2000 | 1,338 | | — |
| 2010 | 1,354 | | 1.2% |
| 2020 | 1,328 | | −1.9% |
| 2024 (est.) | 1,328 | | 0.0% |
U.S. Decennial Census

As of the census of 2000, there were 1,338 people, 511 households, and 388 families residing in the township. The population density was 36.2 inhabitants per square mile (14.0/km^{2}). There were 576 housing units at an average density of 15.6/sq mi (6.0/km^{2}). The racial makeup of the township was 99.18% White, 0.07% African American, 0.15% Native American, 0.52% Asian, and 0.07% from other races. Hispanic or Latino of any race were 0.45% of the population.

There were 511 households, out of which 30.7% had children under the age of 18 living with them, 64.6% were married couples living together, 7.2% had a female householder with no husband present, and 23.9% were non-families. 20.0% of all households were made up of individuals, and 9.2% had someone living alone who was 65 years of age or older. The average household size was 2.62 and the average family size was 3.01.

In the township the population was spread out, with 23.8% under the age of 18, 5.7% from 18 to 24, 29.0% from 25 to 44, 26.3% from 45 to 64, and 15.2% who were 65 years of age or older. The median age was 40 years. For every 100 females, there were 98.2 males. For every 100 females age 18 and over, there were 102.8 males.

The median income for a household in the township was $36,467, and the median income for a family was $39,900. Males had a median income of $32,625 versus $24,688 for females. The per capita income for the township was $16,843. About 9.4% of families and 10.6% of the population were below the poverty line, including 14.8% of those under age 18 and 5.2% of those age 65 or over.
