= Seven Troughs Range =

Mountain range in Nevada, United States

- Location within Nevada

Highest point
- Peak: Seven Trough Peak
- Elevation: 2,376 m (7,795 ft)
- Coordinates: 40°31′5″N 118°49′19″W

Dimensions
- Length: 19 mi (31 km) NNE-SSW
- Width: 5 mi (8.0 km) E-W
- Area: 140 mi^{2} (360 km^{2})

Geography
- Country: United States
- State: Nevada
- District: Pershing County
- Topo map(s): USGS Seven Troughs, Juniper Flat and Rocky Canyon 7.5 min. quads

The Seven Troughs Range is a mountain range in western Pershing County, Nevada.

The name is derived from a series of seven stock watering troughs placed below a set springs.

Neighboring features include:

- the Kamma and Antelope ranges to the north
- the Majuba Mountains to the northeast
- Sage Valley and Trinity Range to the southeast with Lovelock beyond
- Granite Springs Valley to the south
- the Sahwave Mountains and small Blue Wing Mountains to the southwest
- Kumiva Valley and the Selenite Range to the west
- Black Rock Desert to the northwest

== Mining camps ==
Along the southeast margin of the range above Sage Valley are several ghost towns dating from the early 1900s, which served the gold mining activity in the canyons. Below Seven Troughs Canyon was Seven Troughs. Running from northeast to southwest are the sites of Farrell, Mazuma, and Vernon.
