= Buena Vista Valley =

Valley in Pershing County, Nevada, United States

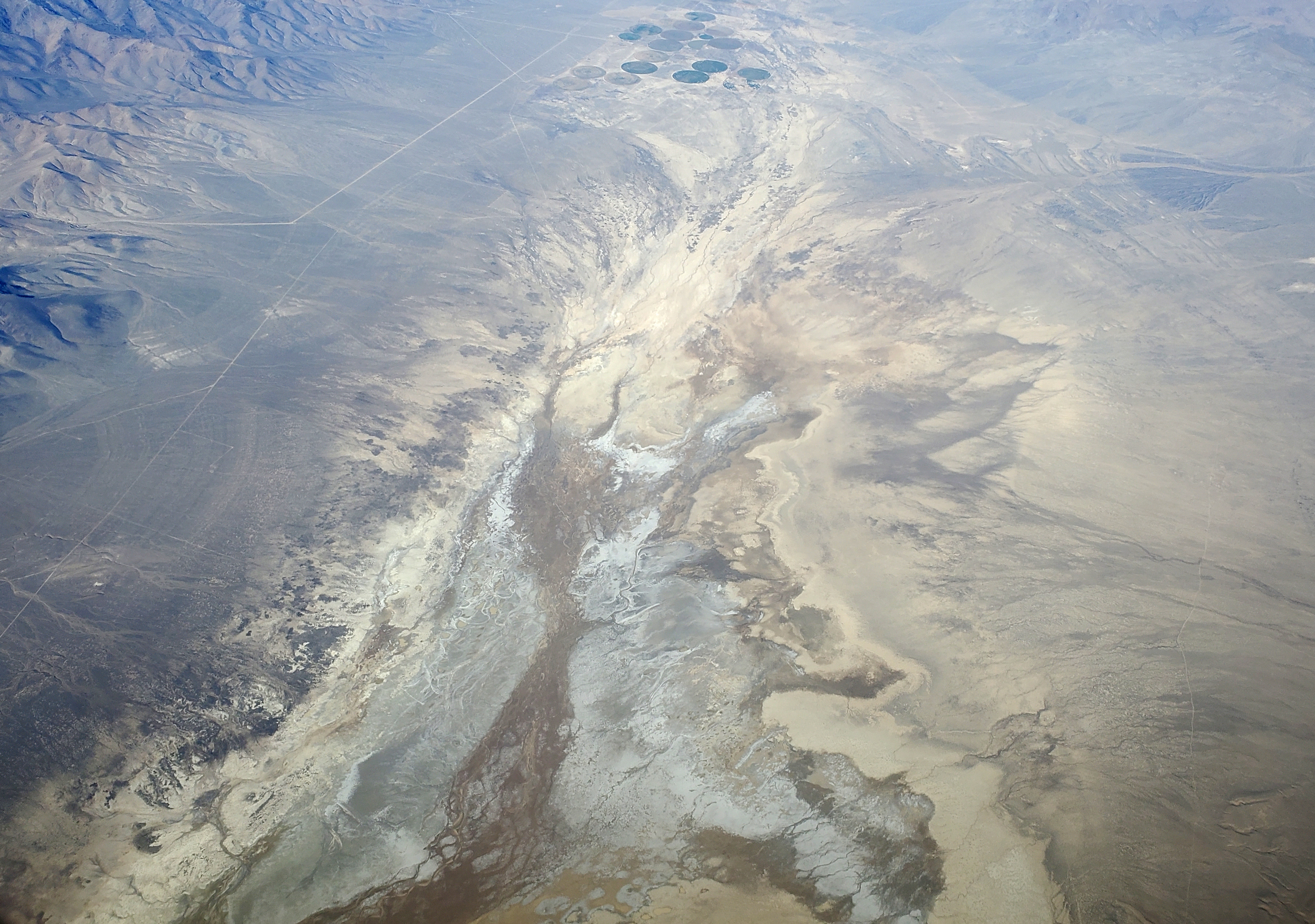
- Aerial view of the northern part of Buena Vista Valley

- Location within Nevada
- Length: 40 mi (64 km) N-S

Geography
- Country: United States
- State: Nevada
- Region: Great Basin
- County: Pershing
- Communities: Unionville; Mill City; Fitting (site)
- Borders on: Humboldt Range; East Range; Stillwater Range; Carson Sink
- Coordinates: 40°21′23″N 117°59′00″W
- Interactive map of Buena Vista Valley

The Buena Vista Valley is an approximately 40-mile (64 km) long valley located in central-east Pershing County, Nevada. Unionville, Nevada lies at its northwest, at the foothills of the Humboldt Range.

The valley contains the approximately 18-mile (29 km) long Buena Vista Lake Bed, a crescent shaped lakebed adjacent the southeast perimeter of the Humboldt Range.

== Description ==
The Buena Vista Valley is an approximately north–south trending valley, and crescent shaped narrowing both due-north in its north end, and due-southwest in the south. The narrowing in the north is from the perimeter ranges of the Humboldt Range, west and the East Range, east. The valley is at its widest at the north end of the Buena Vista Lake Bed, about 13-mi.

The southwest is a region connected to the northwest of the Carson Sink. The narrowing of the valley southwestwards is caused by the Stillwater Range, its north section which turns to trend due-northeast. The low elevation Buena Vista Hills, 5,220 feet (1,591 m), and Chocolate Butte, 4,778 feet (1,456 m), lie between the Carson Sink and the southwest Buena Vista Valley. This hilly region is located in a sub-valley region, named "Antelope Valley".

== Access ==
The south of Buena Vista Valley can be accessed from the west via Interstate 80, north of Lovelock, via Coal Canyon Road; the road is paved to the valley's south end.

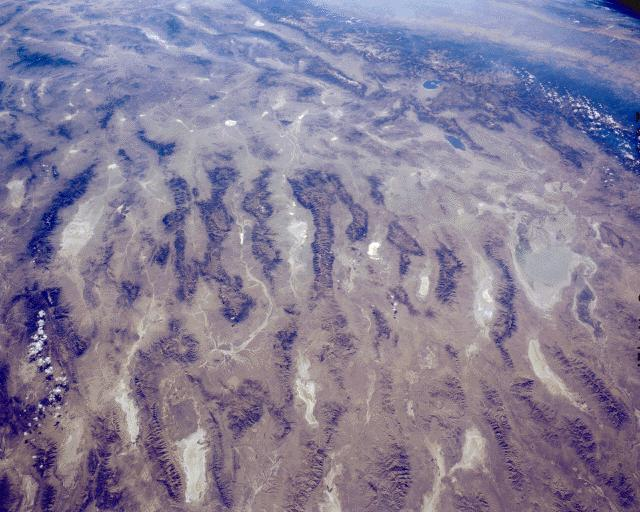
Satellite photo, view south; Carson sink at right (small, black curved range on its northwest is the W. Humboldt Range)-(Pahrump Valley, top-left; Death Valley-top; Sierra Nevada, top-right) The Buena Vista Lake Bed is shown north of Carson Sink, at west of the Humboldt Range.

The valley's north has Nevada State Route 400 traversing due-south from Mill City on I-80 to Unionville at the west foothills of the Humboldt Range. Numerous unimproved roads extend through all areas of the valley.
