= Thunder Mountain =

Thunder Mountain may refer to:

== Places ==
=== United States ===
- Thunder Mountain (Amador County, California)
- Thunder Mountain (Tulare County, California)
- Thunder Mountain (La Plata County, Colorado)
- Thunder Mountain (Idaho)
- Thunder Mountain (Carbon County, Montana), in the Beartooth Mountains
- Thunder Mountain (Wenatchee Mountains), King and Chelan counties in Washington
- Thunder Mountain, New Mexico, unincorporated community

=== Other countries ===
- Mount McKay (Ojibwe: Anemki Wajiw, which translates to Thunder Mountain), Canada
- Thunder Mountain (Dall Island), Canada
- Donnersberg, mountain peak in Germany
  - Mont-Tonnerre, an administrative region (département) within the First French Republic, now the Donnersbergkreis in Germany

== Film and literature ==
- Thunder Mountain (1925 film)
- Thunder Mountain (1935 film)
- Thunder Mountain (1947 film)

== Other uses ==
- Thunder Mountain High School, a public high school in Juneau, Alaska, US
- Thunder Mountain Monument, in Imlay, Nevada, US
- Thunder Mountain Motor Speedway, a racing facility in Texas, US
- Thunder Mountain Ski Area, Massachusetts (later called Berkshire East Ski Resort)
- Big Thunder Mountain Railroad, a rollercoaster in several Disney theme parks
- Thunder Mountain, a video game label of Mindscape

== See also ==
- "Thunder on the Mountain", a song on Bob Dylan's album Modern Times
