= Humboldt Range =

Mountain range in Nevada, United States

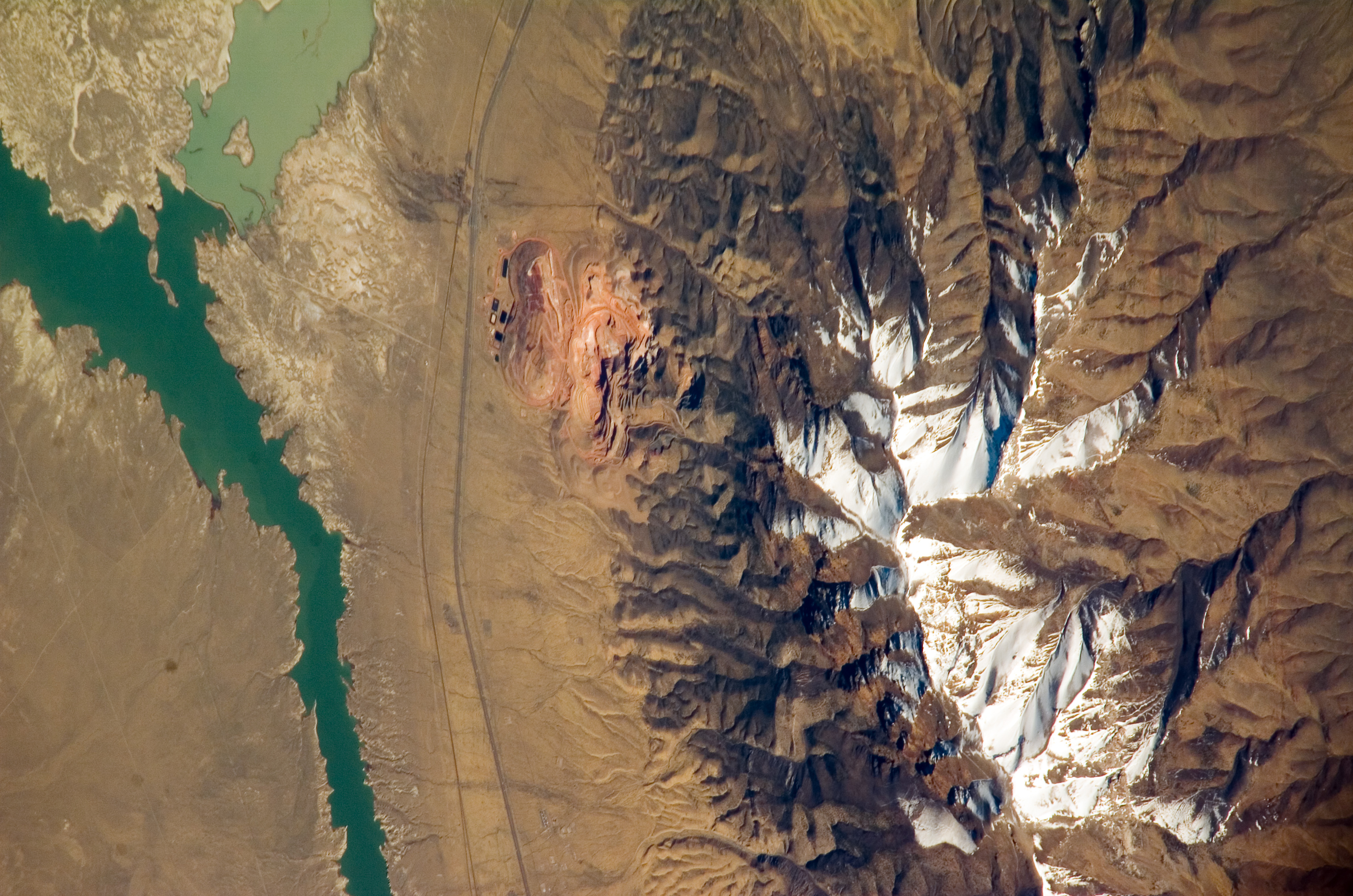
- View of north-half of Humboldt Range (facing due-NNE)

Highest point
- Peak: Star Peak, (north-range)-massif
- Elevation: 9,836 ft (2,998 m)
- Coordinates: 40°31′10″N 118°10′50″W

Geography
- Location within Nevada
- Country: United States
- State: Nevada
- County: Pershing
- Communities: Mill City, Imlay, Unionville, Oreana and Rochester (site)
- Range coordinates: 40°25′03″N 118°09′55″W
- Borders on: Humboldt River and Rye Patch Reservoir

The Humboldt Range is a largely north–south running range of mountains in northwest Nevada, US, that extend from the town of Imlay in the north to the junction with the West Humboldt Range in the south. It is bordered continuously by Interstate 80 and the Humboldt River, largely expanded in the form of the Rye Patch Reservoir in this area, on the west side and by a long and fairly broad Buena Vista Valley to the east, in a typical basin-and-range pattern. The Humboldts are ostensibly visible to travelers along Interstate 80, especially with respect to the highest point of the range, Star Peak, which with a quite nicely defined tip reaches an elevation of 9,836 feet (2,998 m), located in the center of the north range section. The midpoint of the range is in the area of Fourth of July Flat. One historical site, now a ghost town, nearby is called Star City. Unlike some ranges in the vicinity, the substantial height of the Humboldts allows for a number of continuously flowing watersheds, and hiking the terrain is a somewhat noted activity.

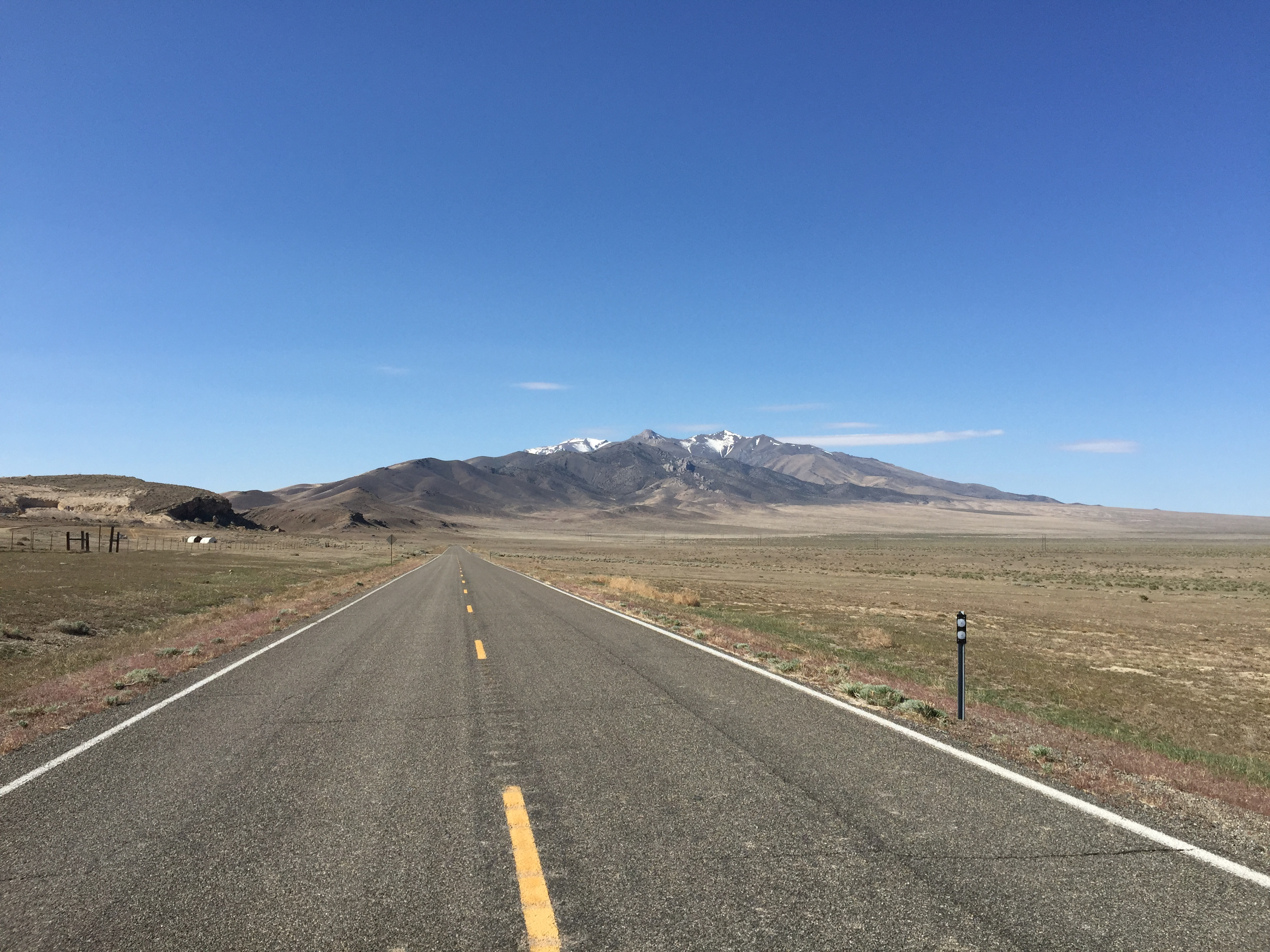
View of the Humboldt Range from SR 400
