= Farrell, Nevada =

- Unincorporated community
- Location within Nevada Location within the United States
- Coordinates: 40°26′38″N 118°46′18″W
- Country: United States
- State: Nevada
- County: Pershing
- Elevation: 5,075 ft (1,547 m)
- Time zone: UTC-8 (Pacific (PST))
  - Summer (DST): UTC-7 (PDT)
- Area code: 775
- GNIS feature ID: 850109

Farrell is a ghost town in Pershing County, Nevada, United States.

L. H. Egbert discovered ore near Farrell in 1863. Gold and silver ore was discovered in the area in 1905, 1907 and 1908. Farrell was located in the Stonehouse Canyon at the northern end of the Seven Troughs mining district in the Seven Troughs Range. On July 12, 1912, a flood devastated the area, killing 8 people in nearby Mazuma. The area never really recovered after the flood.

Farrell's Post Office was in operation from July 1907 until September 1911.

In 1922, a shipment of rich ore was made from the Wild Cat mine located in the area.

A small amount mining and milling occurred at Farrell in the 1930s.

== External Resources ==
- Farrell (Forgottennevada.com)
- Farrell (Nvexpeditions.com)
