= Nevada State Route 400 =

Highway in Nevada

State Route 400
- Unionville Road
- SR 400 highlighted in red

Route information
- Maintained by NDOT
- Length: 16.582 mi (26.686 km)
- Existed: 1976–present

Major junctions
- South end: Kyle Hot Springs Road
- North end: I-80 / US 95 at Mill City

Location
- Country: United States
- State: Nevada

Highway system
- Nevada State Highway System; Interstate; US; State; Pre‑1976; Scenic
← SR 399	→ SR 401

State Route 400 (SR 400) is a state highway in central Pershing County, Nevada. It connects the rural town of Unionville to Mill City. The route originally extended further south under its prior designation as State Route 50.

== Route description ==
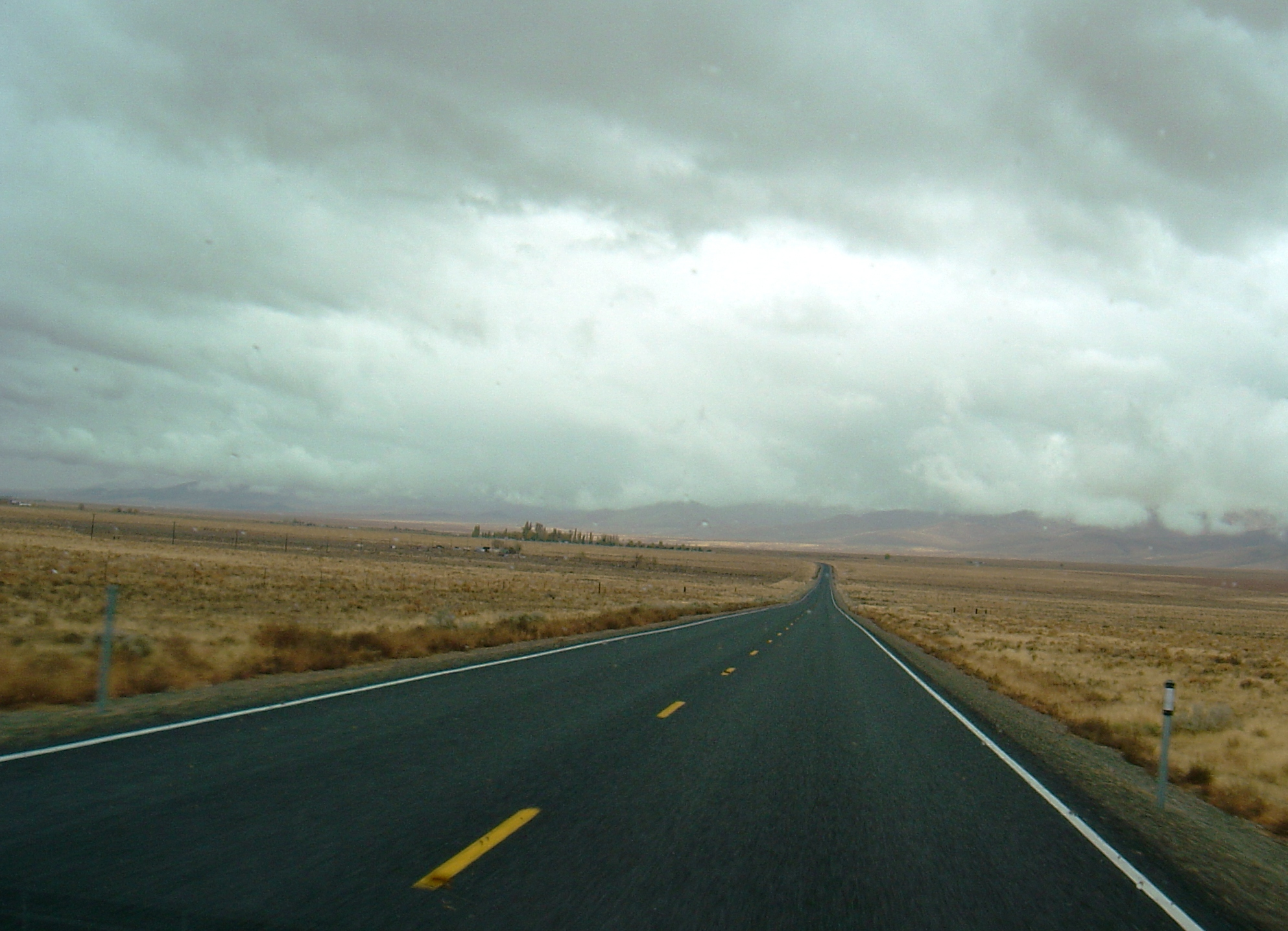
State Route 400 in Pershing County

The route starts at the beginning of pavement on Unionville Road, about 3 miles (4.8 km) east of the rural townsite of Unionville in Buena Vista Valley at Kyle Hot Springs Road. From there, SR 400 heads northward over Buena Vista Creek as it heads northward towards Coyote Ranch. The route parallels the Humboldt Range on its trek northward through the desert. The highway crosses over Star Creek and passes through the Dun Glen Flat as it heads into Mill City. State Route 400 comes to an end at the Mill City Interchange on Interstate 80 and U.S. Route 95.

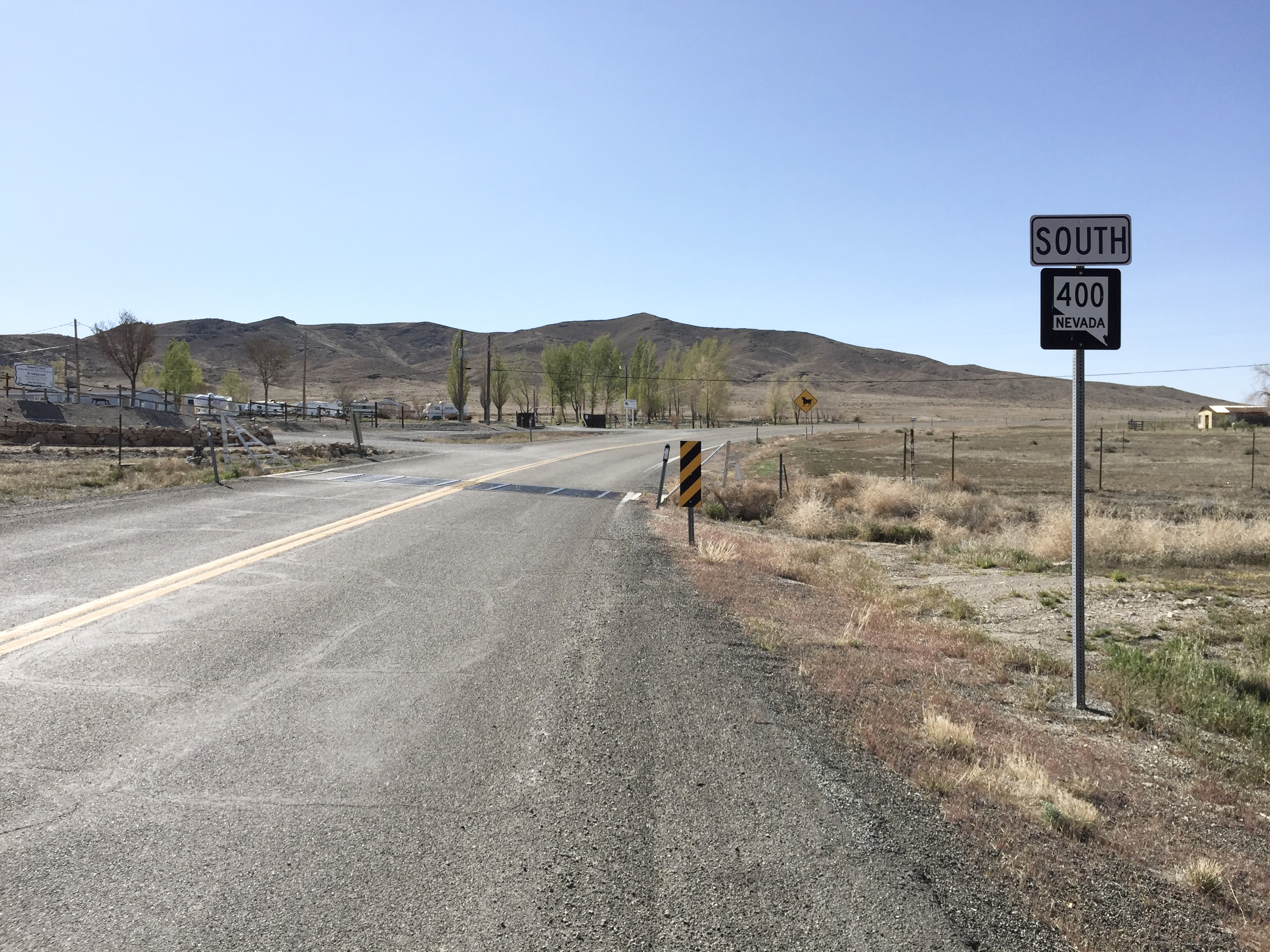
First southbound reassurance sign on SR 400

== History ==
SR 400 was part of the longer State Route 50 before 1976

The route's history begins as far back as 1933, when it appeared on official Nevada maps as a county road, diverging from old U.S. Route 40 beginning in Mill City and heading southerly past the current terminus through the town of Rochester, then westerly to reconnect to US 40. By 1935, the county road had been designated State Route 50 by the state. The route, as it existed in 1936, was an unpaved road approximately 42 miles (68 km) long. By 1941, SR 50 had been rerouted slightly to bypass Rochester to the north, connecting west to Oreana more directly and shaving 3 miles (4.8 km) off the route's length. The northern end of the route, composing the current limits of the highway, was paved by 1959.

SR 50 underwent no other major changes for several more years. However, the route would be affected by the 1976 renumbering of Nevada's state highway system that began on July 1, 1976. The paved portion of the route would become the present-day State Route 400, a designation first seen on state highway maps in 1978. The remainder of former State Route 50 was removed from the state highway system, except for a small section of the southwest end near Interstate 80 which was designated State Route 858 before also being removed from the system.

== Major intersections ==
The entire route is in Pershing County.

Location	mi	km	Destinations	Notes
Unionville	0.00	0.00	Kyle Hot Springs Road	
Mill City	16.56	26.65	I-80 / US 95 – Lovelock, Winnemucca	
1.000 mi = 1.609 km; 1.000 km = 0.621 mi
