= Nevada State Route 50 =

U.S. Route 50 in Nevada

Nevada State Route 50 (1935)

Nevada State Route 50

Nevada State Route 50 may refer to:

- U.S. Route 50 in Nevada
- Nevada State Route 50 (1935), which existed until the 1970s renumbering
