= Majuba =

Majuba may refer to:

- Battle of Majuba Hill, the final and decisive battle of the First Boer War
- Majuba Day, a major annual national celebration on 27 February in the South African Republic
- Majuba: Heuwel van Duiwe (Majuba: Hill of Pigeons), a 1968 South African War drama film based on the battle that was directed by David Millin
- Majuba, English Mod band
- Majuba Mountains, a mountain range in Pershing County, Nevada
- Majuba Power Station, coal-fired power plant in Mpumalanga, South Africa
