= Humboldt City, Nevada =

Humboldt City
- Ghost town
- Location within Nevada
- Coordinates: 40°35′04″N 118°12′43″W
- Country: United States
- State: Nevada
- County: Pershing
- Elevation: 5,312 ft (1,619 m)
- Time zone: UTC-8 (Pacific (PST))
  - Summer (DST): PDT (UTC-7)

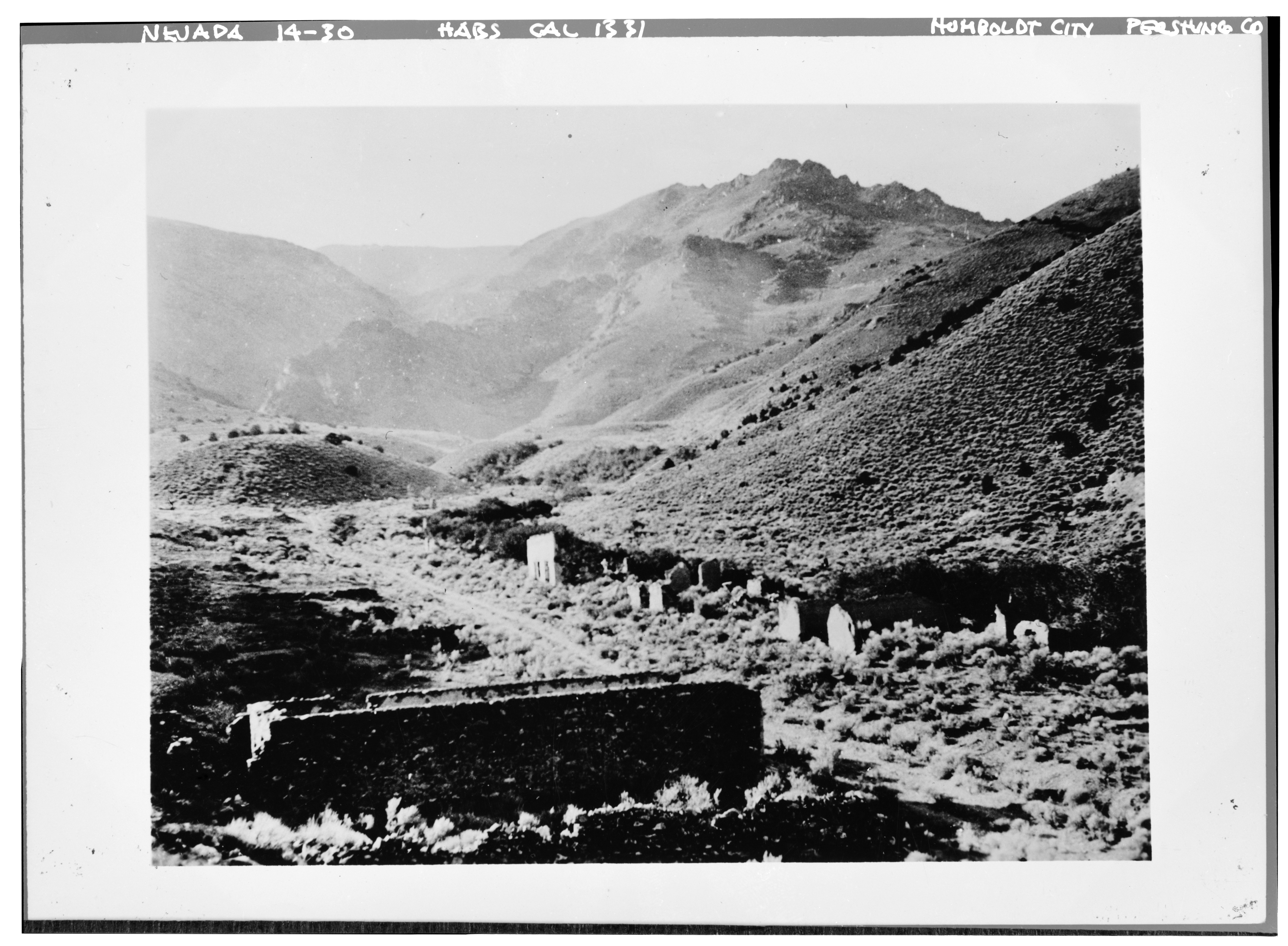
Ghost Town of Humboldt City

Humboldt City, Nevada is a former mining settlement whose ruins lie in Pershing County approximately 10 miles SW of Mill City and 2 miles SE of Interstate 80.

There was a post office in operation from April 1862 until November 1869. The town was settled in mostly due to its location along a creek that runs through the area and the discovery of silver nearby. At the town's peak, there were 200 houses.
