= Nevada Short Line Railway =

Defunct railroad in Nevada, USA

Overview
- Locale: Oreana, Nevada
- Dates of operation: 1913–1918

Technical
- Track gauge: 3 ft (914 mm)

The Nevada Short Line Railway (Silver Belt Railroad) was a 12.6 mi (20.3 km), 3 ft (914 mm) narrow gauge railroad that ran east from Oreana (also known as Nenzel) to the silver mining area of Rochester, Nevada. The railway terminated near, but did not connect with, the Southern Pacific Railroad (SP) in Oreana due to the Nevada Short Line being 3 ft (914 mm) gauge and the SP being a standard gauge mainline. The railway intended to eventually transition to standard gauge, but this never happened.

The railroad started in 1913 as a sole proprietorship and was incorporated on April 24, 1914.

The line only operated for four years. In June 1918, the line was damaged by flooding and the line was abandoned on December 31, 1920.

== Terrain and Route ==
The railway operated from Oreana (Nenzel) which was located along the east bank of the Humboldt River at an elevation of 4,158 ft (1,267 m) above sea level. The railroad continued east through the desert where it had to cross the western edge of the Humboldt Range near Limerick Canyon. The railway had to climb to an altitude of 7,200 ft (2,200 m) at Rochester. The steep terrain the necessitated the need for a switchback and a 6% grade.

== Locomotives ==
The Nevada Short Line had two locomotives.

Nevada Short Line No. 1 - Baldwin-built 3 ft (914 mm) 2-6-0 (Mogul Type) built in 1879 is on static display with a few cars and rests above all other trains on an elevated track at the California State Railroad Museum in Sacramento. The last time the locomotive was run was in 1939-40 for the Golden Gate International Exposition on daily re-enactments of the 1869 Golden Spike ceremony. The locomotive was originally built for the Hobart Mills Company and was sold to the Nevada Short Line in August 1913.

The second engine "Francis," was a 2-truck Heisler locomotive built in 1899 for the Borate and Daggett Railroad and was acquired by the NSL in 1916. It was sold to the Terry Lumber Company at Round Mountain, California.

== See also ==
- List of defunct Nevada railroads
