= Scossa, Nevada =

- Ghost town
- Location within Nevada Location within the United States
- Country: United States
- State: Nevada
- County: Humboldt
- Elevation: 5,289 ft (1,612 m)

Scossa was a small mining town, now a ghost town, located in Pershing County, Nevada.

== History ==
In 1930, James and Charles Scossa discovered gold in the northwest spur of the Antelope mountain range, south of Scossa. Their claim, originally called the North Star Mine, was later renamed and consolidated into the Dawes Gold Mine, Inc. Another large operation, the Hawkeye Mine, began operations in 1934, after a second large discovery of gold deposits. The mining town of Scossa serviced both of these mines, as well as others in the surrounding area.

By 1939 most of the gold and silver available to be mined in the Scossa mining district had been extracted, and the mining camp went into decline. Smaller gold and titanium mining operations, less successful, were continued as late as 1955; today, the site is completely abandoned.

== Location ==
One known building still stands at the site of the Scossa mining town. In addition, other debris and evidence of the town's existence still exists in and around the location, such as a large metal tank and other building materials.
