= Mill City, Nevada =

Community in Nevada, United States

Coordinates: 40°41′01″N 118°04′14″W

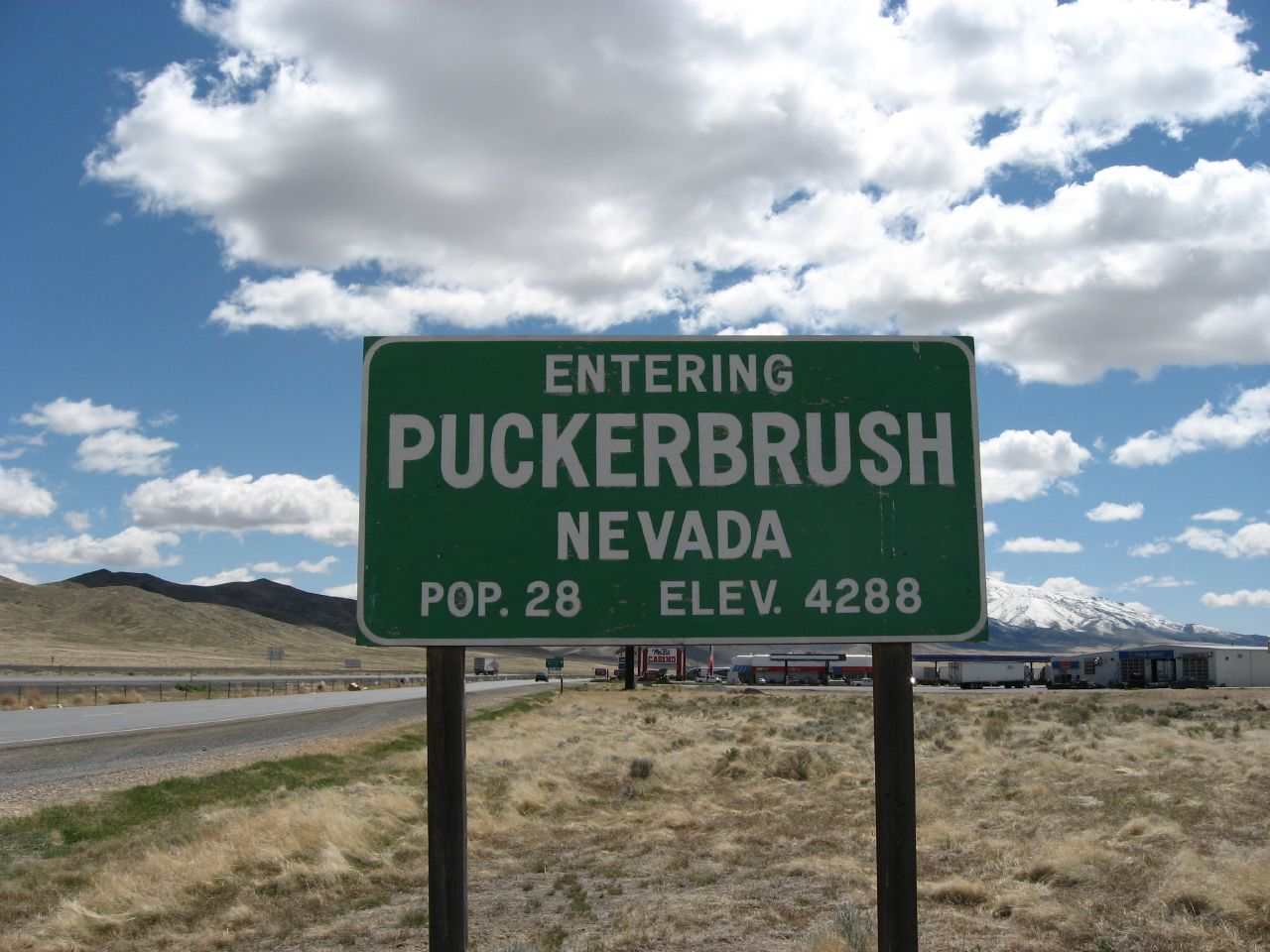
The Burns Brothers nicknamed the town "Puckerbrush"

Mill City is an unincorporated community in Pershing County, Nevada, United States. The ZIP Code of Mill City is 89418.

Mill City had its start as a mining community. The community was named for a quartz mill near the original town site. A post office called Mill City was in operation from 1864 until 1948.

The community is four miles (6.4 km) north of Imlay on Interstate 80. The Humboldt River is to the northwest and the northern end of the Humboldt Range lies to the east. State Route 400 passes through the town, continuing south towards Unionville. The Midway truck stop is located in Mill City, offering services to visitors and the dwindling population.
