= Pershing County Courthouse =

- U.S. National Register of Historic Places
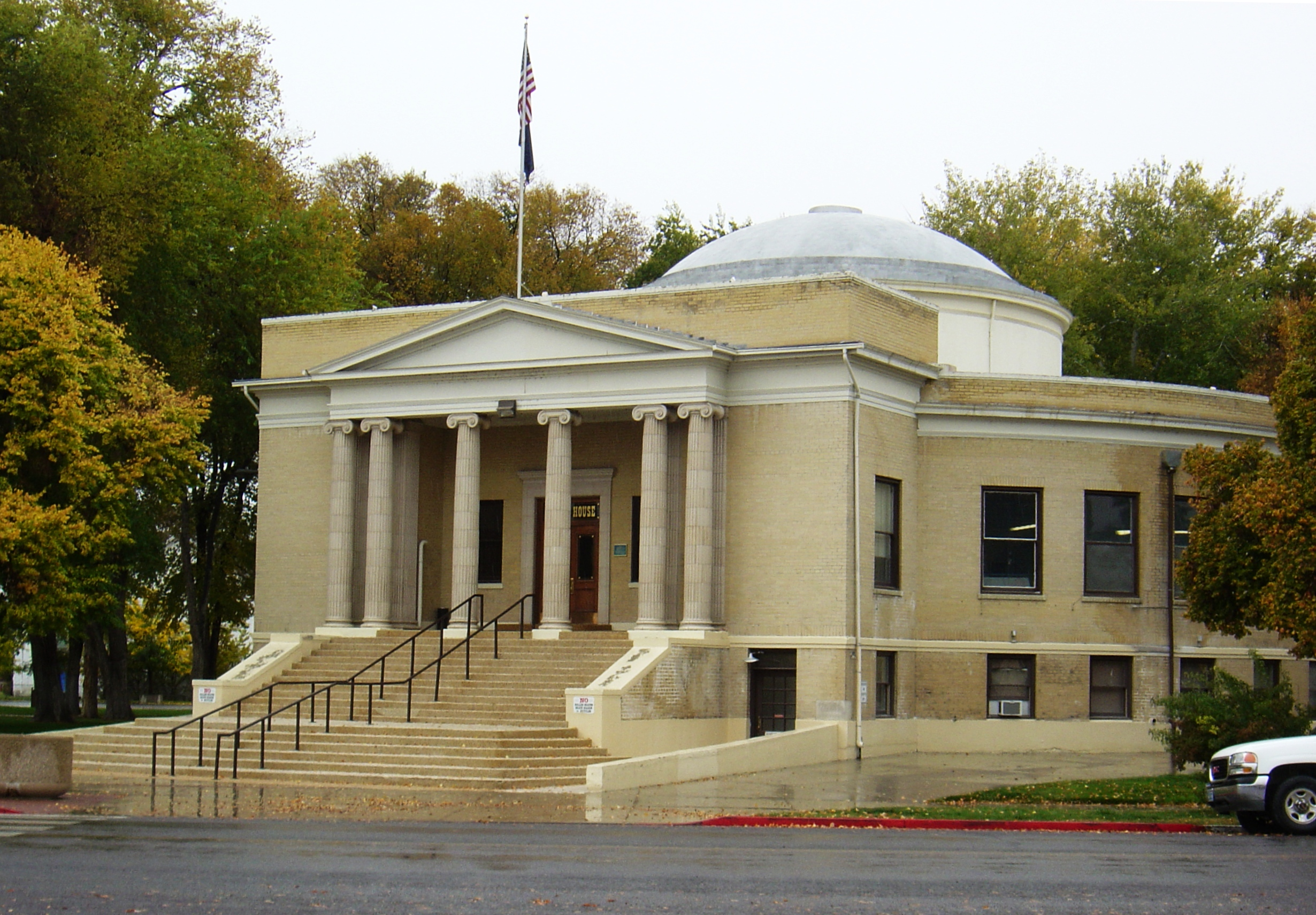

- Location within Nevada Location within the United States
- Interactive map showing the location of Pershing County Courthouse
- Location: 400 Main St., Lovelock, Nevada
- Coordinates: 40°8′35″N 118°30′9″W
- Built: 1920
- Architect: DeLongchamps, Frederic J.; Williams, Howard S.
- Architectural style: Classical Revival
- NRHP reference No.: 86001077
- Added to NRHP: May 13, 1986

The Pershing County Courthouse in Lovelock, Nevada is a Classical Revival building built in 1920–21. The courthouse's plan is hexagonal with a circular dome over the central circular courtroom. The building was designed by Frederic Joseph DeLongchamps, who had previously designed six other Nevada courthouses. DeLongchamps was involved in the design of a new courthouse for Humboldt County, where the old courthouse had burned. As a result of resentment over assessments for the replacement in Winnemucca, the new Pershing County was created from part of Humboldt County and its seat established in Lovelock. DeLongchamps, as Supervising Architect for the State of Nevada, undertook the new Lovelock courthouse.

The courthouse features a shallow Ionic portico on a raised basement backed by a plain rectangular mass. Behind this is the hexagonal main body of the courthouse, built with curving walls. A shallow dome, reminiscent of Thomas Jefferson's University of Virginia Library, crowns the central courtroom. The primary building materials are brick with stone trim and terra cotta detailing. Construction cost amounted to $99,138.68.
