= Humboldt River Ranch, Nevada =

- Census-designated place
- Location within Nevada
- Coordinates: 40°28′1″N 118°16′39″W
- Country: United States
- State: Nevada

Area
  - Total: 20.18 sq mi (52.27 km^{2})
  - Land: 20.18 sq mi (52.27 km^{2})
  - Water: 0 sq mi (0.00 km^{2})
- Elevation: 4,316 ft (1,316 m)

Population (2020)
  - Total: 249
  - Density: 12.3/sq mi (4.76/km^{2})
- Time zone: UTC-8 (Pacific (PST))
  - Summer (DST): UTC-7 (PDT)
- Area code: 775
- FIPS code: 32-34100

Humboldt River Ranch is a census-designated place (CDP) in Pershing County, Nevada, United States. As of the 2020 census, Humboldt River Ranch had a population of 249.

== Geography ==
Humboldt River Ranch is located on the east side of Interstate 80 in northern Nevada, 25 miles (40 km) north (eastbound) of Lovelock and 50 miles (80 km) southwest of Winnemucca. The community is served by Exit 129 on I-80. Nevada State Route 401 leads west 1 mile (1.6 km) to Rye Patch State Recreation Area, located at Rye Patch Dam on the Humboldt River.

According to the U.S. Census Bureau, the Humboldt River Ranch CDP has an area of 12.9 square miles (33.3 km^{2}), all land.

== Demographics ==
Historical population
Census	Pop.	Note	%±
2020	249		—
U.S. Decennial Census
