= Etna, Pershing County, Nevada =

Etna (site), Nevada
- Ghost town
- Location within Nevada Location within the United States
- Coordinates: 40°22′16″N 118°19′14″W
- Country: United States
- State: Nevada
- County: Humboldt
- Elevation: 4,170 ft (1,270 m)

Etna is a former townsite, now a ghost town, in Pershing County, Nevada.

== History ==
Etna was established in 1865 when the mill on site began processing silver ore from nearby mines. The following year, there was a general store, an additional mill, a livery stable, surveyor's office and ferry service across the Humboldt River. Etna had a post office from July 1866 until October 1866. By 1866, one mill had been dismantled and moved to another town and the remaining mill was closed. For the remainder of the decade, milling continued off and on in a limited way. By 1872. Etna was abandoned. Etna's population is now 0.
