= Majuba Mountains =

Mountain range in Nevada, United States

- Location within Nevada

Highest point
- Elevation: 2,003 m (6,572 ft)

Geography
- Country: United States
- State: Nevada
- District: Pershing County
- Range coordinates: 40°39′7.652″N 118°29′9.552″W
- Topo map: USGS Majuba Mountain

The Majuba Mountains are a mountain range in Pershing County, Nevada.

The Majuba placer has produced impressive gold specimens.

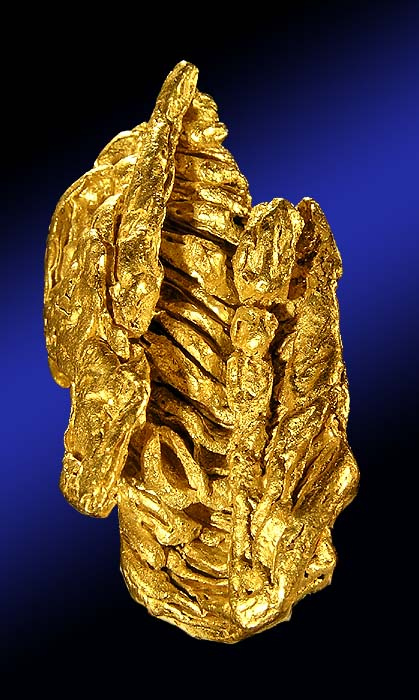
An impressive specimen of crystalline gold from the Majuba placer
