= Rochester, Nevada =

Rochester
- Ghost town
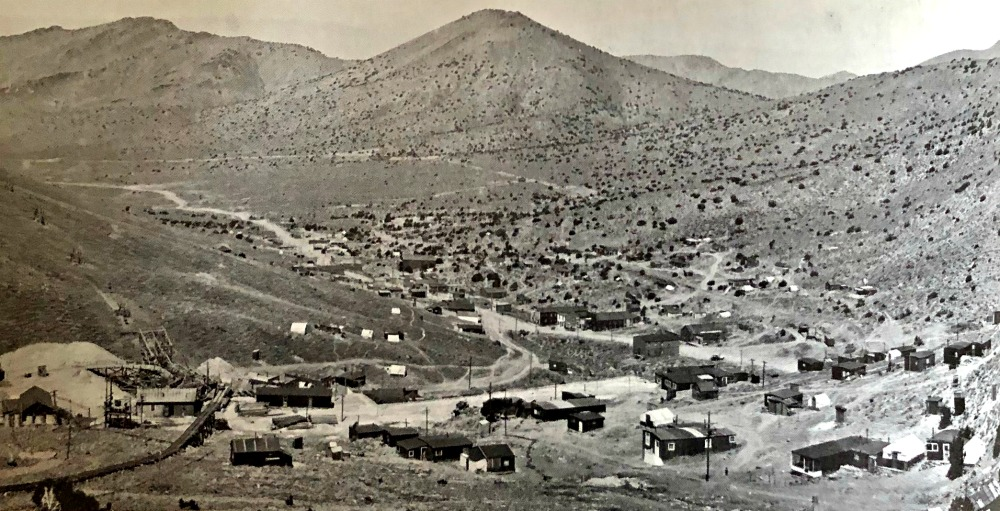
- Upper Rochester, Nevada

- Location within the state of Nevada Rochester (the United States)
- Coordinates: 40°17′20″N 118°10′13″W
- Country: United States
- State: Nevada
- County: Pershing
- Established: 1912
- Elevation: 2,047 m (6,716 ft)
- Time zone: UTC-8 (Pacific (PST))
  - Summer (DST): UTC-7 (PDT)

Rochester was a silver-mining town in Pershing County, Nevada, US, approximately 110 mi (180 km) east of Reno. It is now a ghost town. Lower Rochester is still accessible to visitors, but was largely destroyed by a wildfire in 2012; Upper Rochester has been buried under mine tailings of the more recent Coeur Rochester open pit mine.

== History ==
Rochester is the collective name for three different sites: Rochester Heights, Upper Rochester and Lower Rochester, spread out along a 3 mi (4.8 km) stretch of Rochester Canyon. When gold was discovered here in the 1860s by immigrants from Rochester, New York, there was only one camp, at the upper end of the canyon. Later this became known as Rochester Heights (often, along with Upper Rochester, called "Old Town"). Exploration and mining was on a fairly small scale from the 1860s, with the ore processed on a small scale, or shipped by wagon to larger towns for milling.

Gold was discovered in this area in the early 1860s, but it was not until a discovery by Joseph Nenzel of rich silver ore in 1912 that Rochester became a true boom town. By November 1912, as word of the find spread, people streamed into the area. The town expanded and Upper Rochester came into being, as well as the beginnings of what became known as Lower Rochester. Rochester Heights was soon lumped in with Upper Rochester, and those towns became collectively known as Old Town, with Lower Rochester being the new town. Rochester Canyon is a fairly narrow canyon, with steep slopes on either side of the narrow canyon floor, and so the camps tended to spread down the canyon, rather than outwards. As more and more people came to the area, the two camps soon boasted saloons, hotels and other businesses. Upper and Lower Rochester became thriving mining sites, with a population exceeding 1,500. Most of the commercial district was in Upper Rochester, with Lower Rochester having the mill and other mining support facilities. The town boasted of having The Rochester Philharmonic Orchestra.

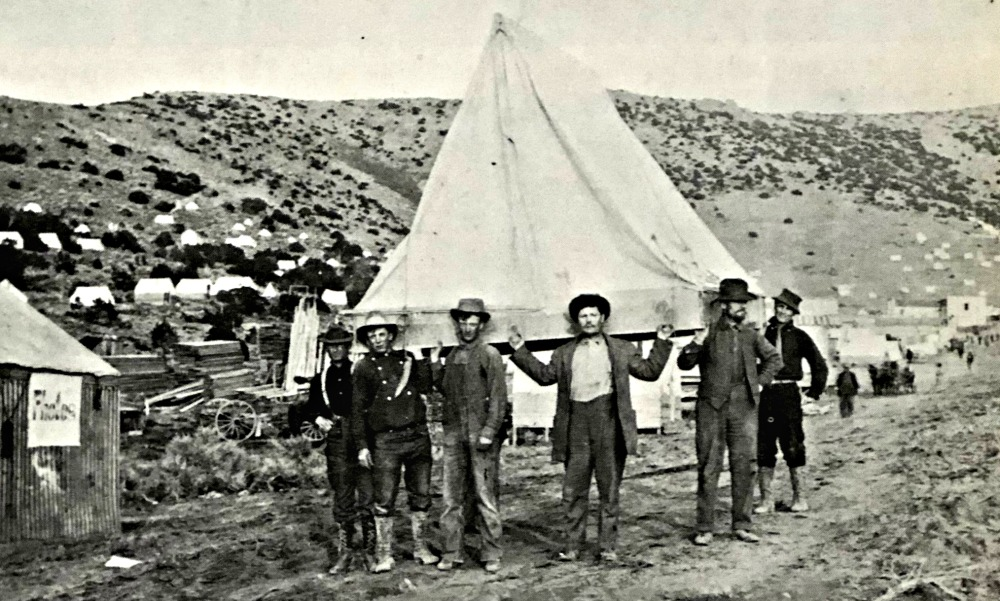
Tent move, Rochester, 1913

In 1914, the Nevada Short Line Railway extended its tracks from Oreana, which was east of Rochester. The railway was then operating up into Limerick Canyon from Oreana, but a spur was built which branched off into Rochester Canyon as far as Lower Rochester. In August 1915, the railway extended the tracks up the canyon through Upper Rochester to reach the mine at the end of the canyon, with the intention that the ore could be hauled down to the milling operations in Lower Rochester. The operation of the railroad was undependable at best, however. Equipment difficulties (the railroad was using old second-hand locomotives), fires and accidents, along with the vagaries of the management of the railway (it went into receivership in late 1915, but was given one last chance by a District Court judge in Reno to be profitable), meant that the mines could never depend entirely on the railroad. The railway struggled to make a profit and to operate on a reasonable schedule through 1915 and into 1916, but the mines were not happy about the service. Finally, having had enough, the mine announced in September 1916 that it would build a tramway from the mines down to the mill in Lower Rochester. By mid-1917, the tramway was in operation and the days of the Nevada Short Line were numbered. It again went into receivership in 1918, and finally by 1919 it was completely shut down and the equipment was sold off. The rails were ripped up and completely gone by 1920.

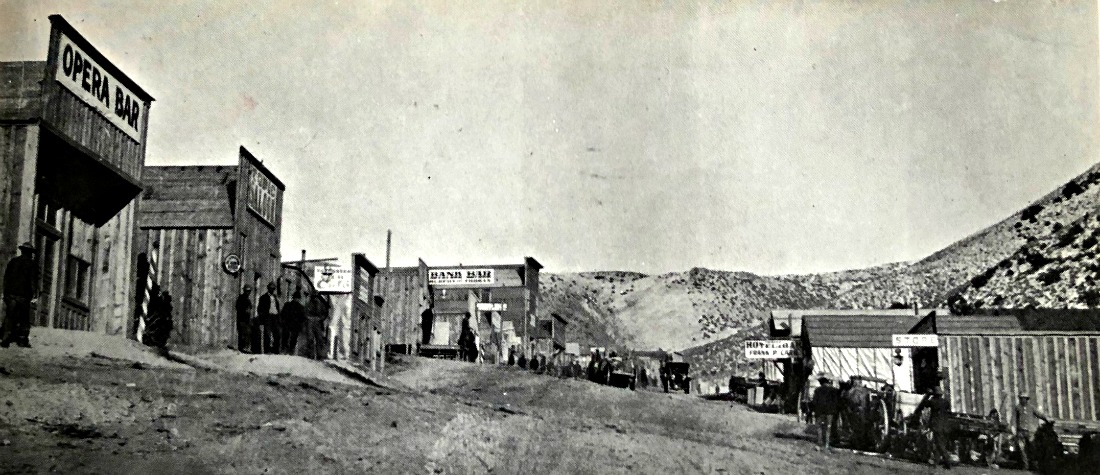
Lower Rochester, 1913.

Transportation problems did not stop mining; the mine continued to operate until 1942, producing over $9 million in silver and gold. Rochester as a town, however, began to wane slowly after 1922, and by 1926 the post office had closed, as had many businesses. After 1942, the mine was shuttered for long periods, operating only intermittently as silver and gold prices warranted. Most people had completely left the area by 1951 and at best there was "caretaker" status by a few resolute souls who lived on and off in the few remaining buildings.

In 1986, Coeur d'Alene Mines began large scale open pit mining operations on Nenzel Hill and beyond. This new operation (Coeur Rochester, and in 2003 the nearby Packard Mine) has buried nearly all of Upper Rochester under large mine tailing piles. Lower Rochester still has many foundations and some wooden structures, one of which is the remains of a large mill building. Additionally, the remains of the wood towers for the tramway can still be seen on the hillside, and the old rail bed of the Nevada Short Line can be followed much of the way through the canyon.

== Location ==
Rochester is at an elevation of 5,563 ft (1,696 m) approximately 110 miles east from Reno on Interstate 80; from there turn south east on a dirt road for 10.2 mi (16.4 km) to the location of Lower Rochester town site.
