= Vernon, Nevada =

- Ghost town
- Location within Nevada Location within the United States
- Country: United States
- State: Nevada
- County: Humboldt
- Elevation: 4,646 ft (1,416 m)

Vernon was a small mining town, now a ghost town, located in Pershing County, Nevada northwest of Lovelock.

== History ==
The town was founded in 1905 to serve as a base for the nearby mines in the Seven Troughs mining district. The post office opened in October 1906. The mines remained active for the better part of 3–4 years, but by 1910 the ore was pretty much played out, and the mines began to reduce operations and / or close down entirely. As this happened, the town itself began to dwindle (down to a population of only 300 in 1907), and by 1918 so few people were left in Vernon and the nearby area that the post office closed its doors.

== Tunnel Camp ==
Tunnel Camp, located two miles north of Vernon, was created in 1927 to build a mill and to dig a tunnel to the shafts of the older mines in the Seven Troughs area. The idea was similar to the idea behind the Sutro Tunnel near Virginia City. The tunnel to be built at Tunnel Camp was to be about 2.5 miles long so as to allow easier removal of waste rock, ore and water.

Many of the wooden buildings from Vernon were moved to Tunnel Camp. This spelled the end of Vernon as a town, and the last residents moved on shortly thereafter.

The miners missed the shafts and in 1934 the effort was abandoned.

Tunnel Camp was also known as New Seven Troughs and as Tunnel.

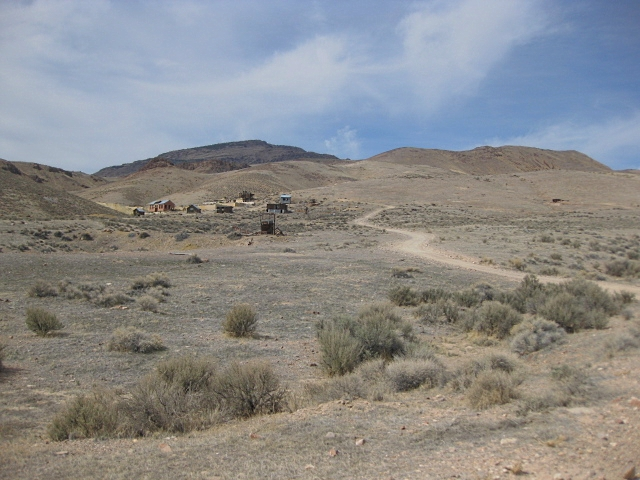
Tunnel Camp panorama, 2013

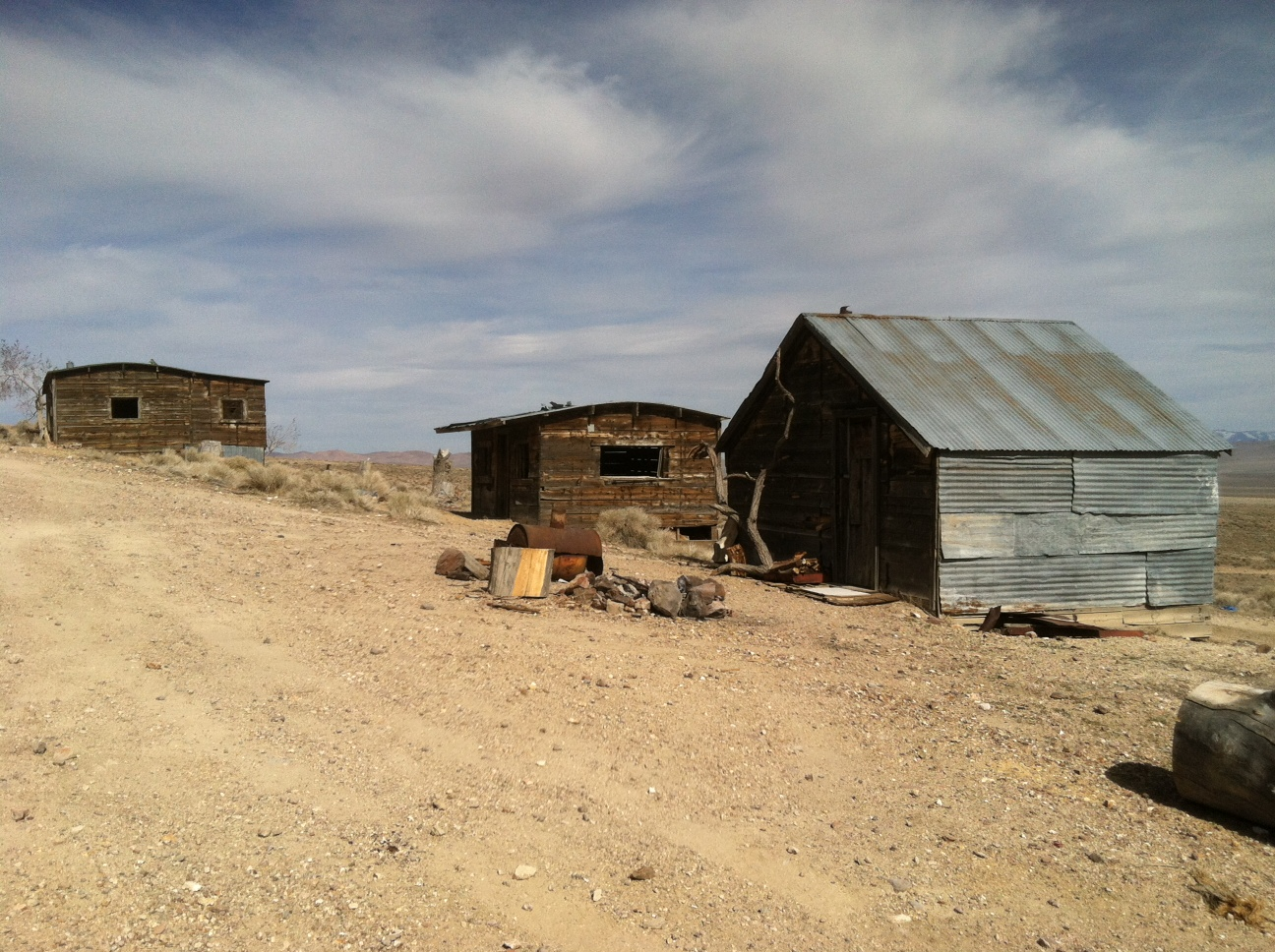
Tunnel Camp ghost town, 2013

== Location ==
To reach the site of Vernon in the present day, there is a two-laned paved road leading out to the Eagle-Pitcher diatomaceous earth mine, 14 miles from Lovelock towards Vernon. Bearing away from the mine road onto a dirt road will take you the last 12 miles to the site of Vernon. The site contains the heavily vandalized remains of the old stone jail, some depressions from old building foundation locations, and wood debris scattered about in the sagebrush.
