= Antelope Range (Pershing County, Nevada) =

Mountain range in Nevada, United States

- Location within Nevada

Highest point
- Elevation: 1,879 m (6,165 ft)

Geography
- Country: United States
- State: Nevada
- District: Pershing County
- Range coordinates: 40°45′07″N 118°29′25″W
- Topo map: USGS Majuba Mountain

The Antelope Range is a mountain range in Pershing County, Nevada.

The range was so named on account of antelope in the area.
