= Mazuma, Nevada =

Mazuma
- Ghost town
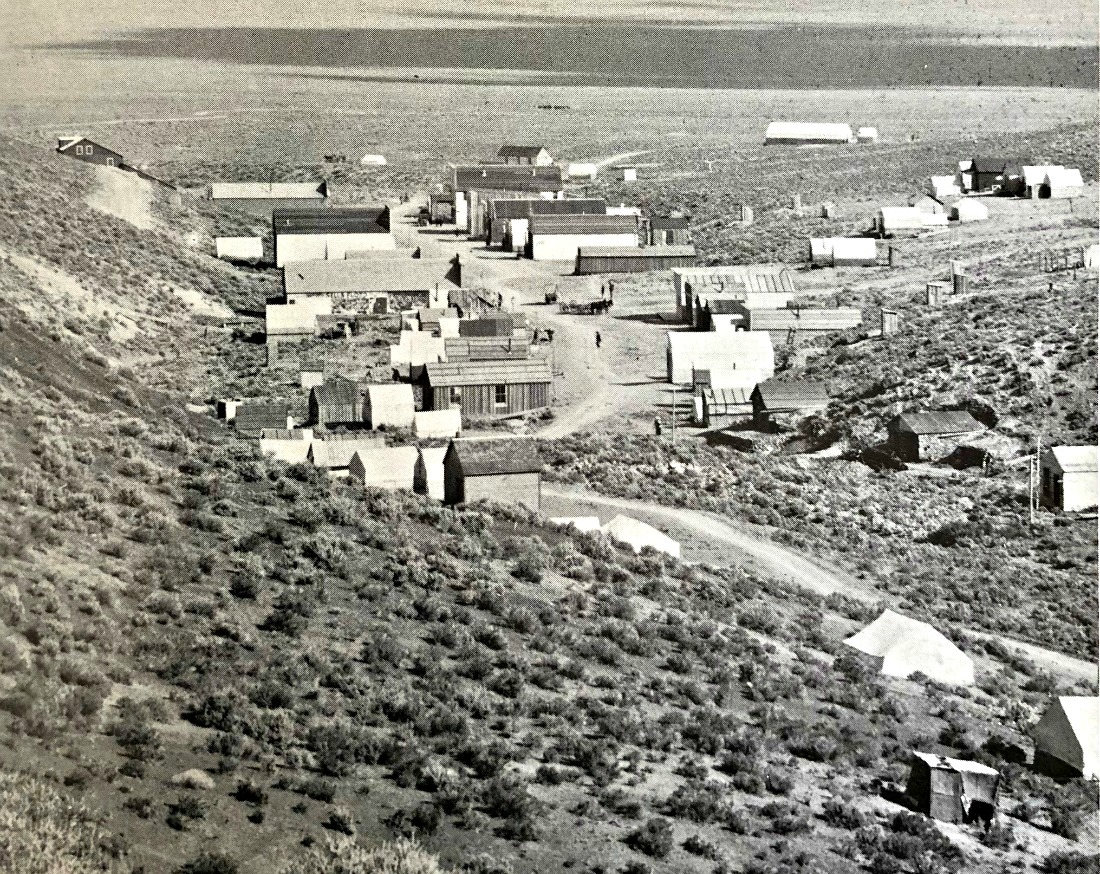
- Etymology: Derived from Yiddish slang word for money: m'zumon
- Location within Nevada
- Coordinates: 40°28′18″N 118°45′50″W
- Country: United States
- State: Nevada
- County: Pershing
- Elevation: 4,846 ft (1,477 m)
- Time zone: UTC-8 (Pacific (PST))
  - Summer (DST): PDT (UTC-7)

Mazuma was a small mining town in Pershing County, Nevada where eight people were killed in a flash flood on July 11, 1912.

Mazuma was founded in 1907 and a post office was established on August 28, 1907. The name "Mazuma" is derived from a Yiddish slang word for money: m'zumon. Other sources indicate that m'zumon means "the ready necessary".

Just after 5pm on July 12, 1912, a 10-foot (3.0 m) wall of water was observed upstream from Mazuma at the Seven Troughs Canyon. The Seven Troughs Cyanide Plant was destroyed, releasing dozens of gallons of cyanide into the flood. A phone call was made, but due to the electrified atmosphere, the only word that could be heard at Mazuma was "water." The warning was not received in time, the 20-foot (6.1 m) high, 150-foot (46 m) wide flash flood hit Mazuma and killed almost a tenth of the population. Over the following weeks, relief efforts included visits by doctors and nurses from as far as Reno. A statewide relief fund was set up. In addition, a relief fund was set up by the San Francisco Examiner, where William Randolph Hearst personally donated $100.

Postmistress Maude Ruddell was killed in the flood when the post office collapsed on her while she was attempting to save the money. The post office formally moved from Mazuma to Seven Troughs on November 30, 1912.

The Mazuma Hills Mill, located upstream of Mazuma, burned down 13 days after the flood, though the Darby Mill located southwest of Mazuma, operated from 1909 until it was dismantled in 1918.
