= Nenzel Hill =

Mountain in Nevada, United States

Coordinates: 40°17′02″N 118°09′14″W

Nenzel Hill is a summit in the U.S. state of Nevada. The elevation is 7,290 feet (2,220 m).

Nenzel Hill was named after Joseph F. Nenzel, a businessman in the local mining industry.
