= Thunder Mountain Monument =

Series of outsider art sculptures in Nevada, U.S.

Coordinates: 40.66004°N 118.1335032°W

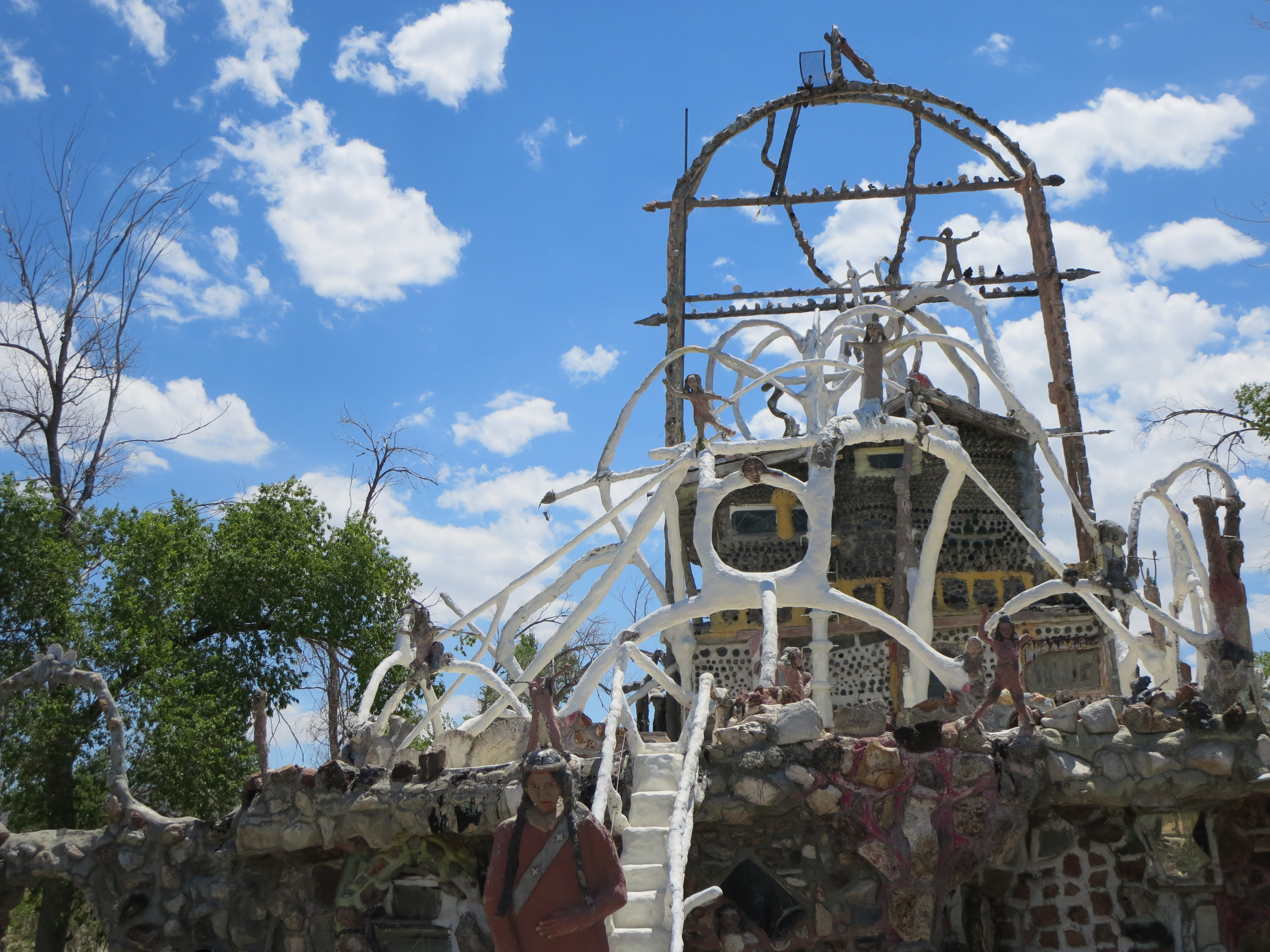
Thunder Mountain Monument

The Thunder Mountain Monument is a series of outsider art sculptures and architectural forms that were assembled by Frank Van Zant starting in 1969 upon his arrival in Imlay, Nevada; it is located on a shoulder of Interstate 80.

A World War II veteran from Oklahoma, Frank Van Zant had served with the 7th Armored Division, fought in several campaigns in Europe, and been badly burned in a tank battle outside Leipzig. Born on an Indian Reservation in Okmulgee, Oklahoma, on November 11, 1921, he was the son of Sydney Grove Van Zant and grandson of Alexander Grove Van Zant and due to his upbringing he identified himself as Creek Indian, although his father became disenchanted with the sovereignty of the Creek Nation and became an individual he took the Native American name Rolling Mountain Thunder after experiencing an epiphany. He took on the twin but related tasks of both building shelters from the presumed coming apocalypse, and making a de facto spiritual haven for spiritual seekers of the hippie era. (There is no Thunder Mountain in the vicinity.)

The site covers five acres on the south side of a 1,000-foot (305 m) stretch of Interstate 80. There were originally seven buildings, including a three-story hostel where many hippies stayed in the 1970s. Three stone and concrete buildings remain, and more than 200 concrete sculptures depicting Native Americans and their protective spirits, massacres, and injustices against them. Thunder Mountain Monument (or Park) is replete with found objects, such as car hoods, dolls' heads, typewriters, and gas pumps, many of which are incorporated into the buildings themselves; the third floor has one wall made up of antique bottles which form a stained glass window of a different sort; other floors have windows from antique windshields and bottles incorporated therein to provide a lighting source; one framework forms a large handle so the Great Spirit could take the building away after Thunder's death.

The site was partially destroyed by arson in 1983, the same year Van Zant was named Nevada's Artist of the Year; he committed suicide by shooting himself in the head in 1989. The monument was neglected and subject to vandalism until it was declared a Nevada State Historic Site in 1992; it is now under the care of his grown children under the aegis of a State of Nevada Historic Site Restoration Project, and is partially open to the public for self-guided tours. Van Zant has been the subject of two short documentaries.
