= Thunder Mountain Motor Speedway =

Coordinates: 31.856208°N 95.187949°W

- Location: Cherokee County, near Rusk, Texas, USA
- Opened: 1995
- Closed: 2006
- Construction cost: unknown
- Architect: Comer Hudson
- Major events: Piney Woods Classic
- Website: http://www.racetms.com/

oval
- Surface: Dirt
- Length: 0.5 km (0.31 mi)

Thunder Mountain Speedway was a 3/10 mile dirt track racing facility in East Texas located just north of Rusk, Texas, United States, on U.S. Route 69. Dubbed the "Potato Chip" for its unique shape, the track was a favorite of many drivers. Aside from the dirt track, the facility (which covered 187 acres (76 ha)) also included over 6 miles (9.7 km) of cross-country trails. The facility opened for motocross use in December 1992, and the track began to be used for motorcycle races in mid-1993. A 1993 article in the Tyler Courier-Times indicated that it was intended to begin car races on the dirt track in 1994, and that there were also plans to add a mud bog and BMX facilities. The facility fell on hard times in its last few years of operation, and closed in 2006.
