= Seven Troughs, Nevada =

- Ghost town
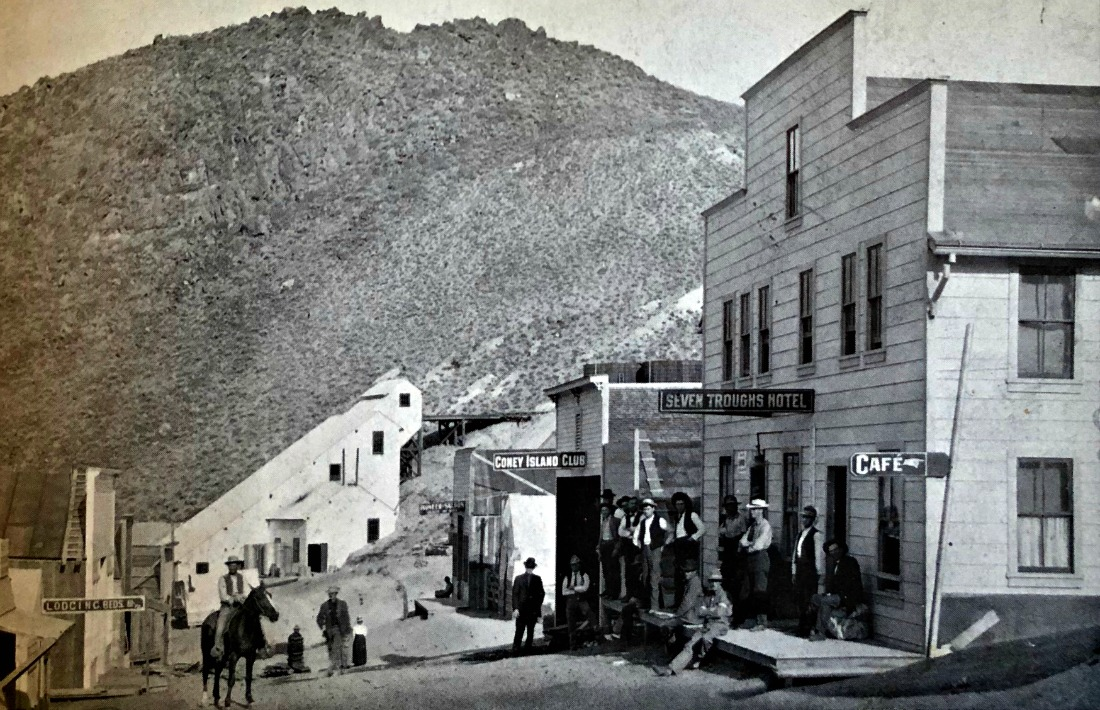

- Location within Nevada Location within the United States
- Coordinates: 40°27′58″N 118°47′6″W
- Country: United States
- State: Nevada
- County: Pershing
- Elevation: 5,255 ft (1,602 m)
- Time zone: UTC-8 (Pacific (PST))
  - Summer (DST): UTC-7 (PDT)
- Area code: 775
- GNIS feature ID: 856135

Seven Troughs is a ghost town in Pershing County, Nevada, United States.

== History ==
The settlement was founded in 1906 after gold was discovered in Seven Troughs Canyon the prior year. There was a rush of people to the area, and by 1907, the mining camp had a post office, hotel, multiple saloons, stores and a population of 350. A water system and school were built in 1908. The settlement thrived until World War I, with the robust production of the nearby Kindergarten mine and mill. The local mines produced two millions dollars in gold from 1908 to 1918. By 1918, the post office had closed and the town declined to a few transient miners.
