= Oreana, Nevada =

- Unincorporated community
- Location within Nevada Location within the United States
- Coordinates: 40°18′39″N 118°22′14″W
- Country: United States
- State: Nevada
- County: Pershing
- Elevation: 4,058 ft (1,237 m)
- Time zone: UTC-8 (Pacific (PST))
  - Summer (DST): UTC-7 (PDT)
- Area code: 775
- GNIS feature ID: 848204

Oreana is a ghost town in Pershing County, Nevada, United States.

Oreana was a milling town from 1865-1885 and should not be confused with Oreana Station located 3 miles to the northeast on what was initially the Central Pacific Railway.

The Montezuma Smelting Works was built at Oreana in 1857 to smelt ores from the Arabia and Trinity mining districts. The Montezuma smelter was the first lead smelter in the U.S. to ship lead commercially. Other lead smelters shipped their output locally.

At one time, Oreana was larger than what was then known as "Lovelock's" (today known as Lovelock). However, Lovelock's became larger after Lovelock's successful bid for a Central Pacific station. Oreana only got a full station in early 1913 when the narrow-gauge Nevada Short Line Railway connected from Oreana to Rochester.

The Post Office in Oreana operated from February 1867 until July 1869 and then from February 1870 until September 1873 and finally from October 1873 until March 1883.

The name Oreana may come from the "ore" plus the Greek "ana", which means "greatly" or "excessively". The name could also be a corruption of the Spanish "orejano", meaning "unbranded".

The population was 68 in 1940.

== Oreana Station ==
Oreana Station was a station on the Central Pacific Railway from the 1870s until 1924. The station was a supply center for the mines at Rochester. Oreana Station was also known as Oreana, Nenzel and Nenzel Station.

The Post Office at Oreana Station operated with the name Oreana from August 1913 until February 1951. Note that the town was also known as Dad's Lee.
