= Imlay, Nevada =

Unincorporated town in the State of Nevada, United States

- Unincorporated town
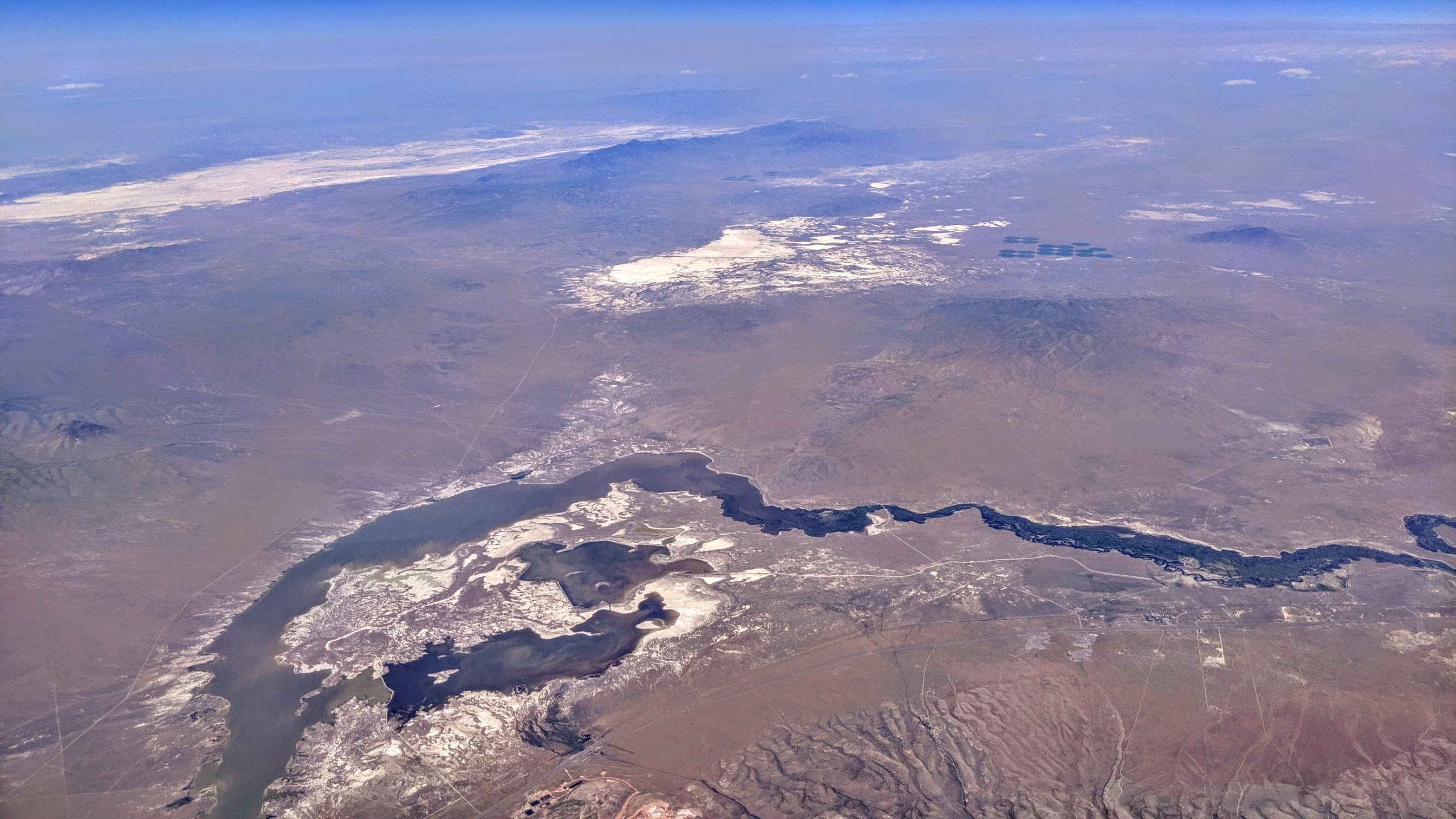
- Imlay (at lower right) is near the Lassens Meadows, above Rye Patch Reservoir, on the Humboldt River.

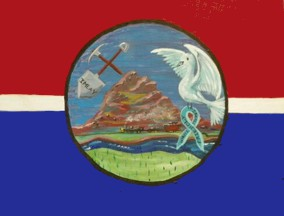
- Flag

- Location within Nevada
- Coordinates: 40°39′39″N 118°09′02″W
- Country: United States
- State: Nevada

Area
  - Total: 1.18 sq mi (3.06 km^{2})
  - Land: 1.18 sq mi (3.06 km^{2})
  - Water: 0 sq mi (0.00 km^{2})
- Elevation: 4,203 ft (1,281 m)

Population (2020)
  - Total: 210
  - Density: 177.6/sq mi (68.58/km^{2})
- Time zone: UTC-8 (Pacific (PST))
  - Summer (DST): UTC-7 (PDT)
- ZIP code: 89418
- Area code: 775
- FIPS code: 32-34700
- GNIS feature ID: 0841225

Imlay is an unincorporated town in Pershing County, Nevada, United States. It has an elementary school, a general store, a post office, and a trading post. As of the 2010 census, the population was 171.

It is a nearly abandoned railroad town, named for a nearby mine or for the civil engineer who surveyed the town circa 1907. Its most notable feature is a series of strange buildings called Thunder Mountain Monument. These structures were built as a monument to Native American culture by a World War II veteran who called himself Thunder.

Michael Feldman's Whad'Ya Know? public radio show featured Imlay as the "Town of the Week" on its December 5, 2009, show. They mentioned Thunder Mountain Monument as one of the premier draws to the area.

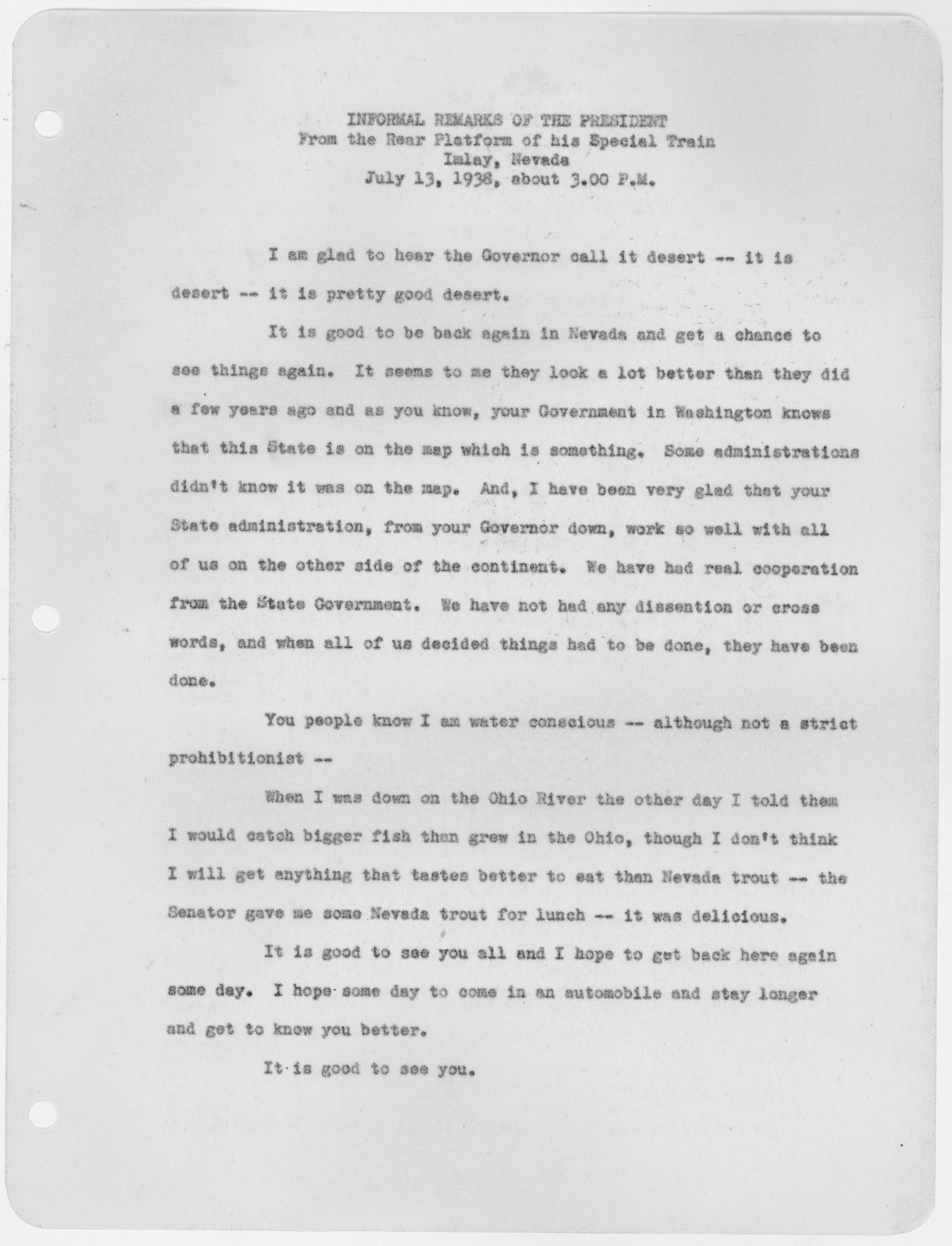
Remarks by Franklin D. Roosevelt during 1938 visit to Imlay

== Geography ==
Imlay is located in northern Pershing County, Nevada, along Interstate 80, with access from Exit 145. The town is 34 miles (55 km) west of Winnemucca and 40 miles (64 km) northeast of Lovelock. The Humboldt River flows past 2 miles (3 km) to the north, near its inlet into Rye Patch Reservoir.

According to the U.S. Census Bureau, the census-designated place of Imlay has an area of 34.5 square miles (89.4 km^{2}), all land.

=== Climate ===
According to the Köppen Climate Classification system, Imlay has a cold semi-arid climate, abbreviated "BSk" on climate maps. The hottest temperature recorded in Imlay was 112 °F (44.4 °C) on July 17, 1959, while the coldest temperature recorded was −35 °F (−37.2 °C) on January 17, 1917, and December 25, 1924.

Climate data for Imlay, Nevada, 1991–2020 normals, extremes 1914–present
Month	Jan	Feb	Mar	Apr	May	Jun	Jul	Aug	Sep	Oct	Nov	Dec	Year
Record high °F (°C)	70 (21)	76 (24)	82 (28)	90 (32)	99 (37)	108 (42)	112 (44)	106 (41)	104 (40)	98 (37)	82 (28)	78 (26)	112 (44)
Mean maximum °F (°C)	56.9 (13.8)	63.0 (17.2)	72.1 (22.3)	79.8 (26.6)	88.3 (31.3)	96.4 (35.8)	101.4 (38.6)	99.4 (37.4)	93.4 (34.1)	83.0 (28.3)	68.6 (20.3)	58.3 (14.6)	102.1 (38.9)
Mean daily maximum °F (°C)	41.6 (5.3)	47.5 (8.6)	56.1 (13.4)	61.6 (16.4)	71.1 (21.7)	81.5 (27.5)	92.0 (33.3)	90.1 (32.3)	80.6 (27.0)	66.6 (19.2)	51.6 (10.9)	40.7 (4.8)	65.1 (18.4)
Daily mean °F (°C)	30.7 (−0.7)	35.3 (1.8)	42.0 (5.6)	47.3 (8.5)	56.4 (13.6)	65.8 (18.8)	74.8 (23.8)	71.9 (22.2)	62.6 (17.0)	49.6 (9.8)	37.7 (3.2)	29.4 (−1.4)	50.3 (10.2)
Mean daily minimum °F (°C)	19.9 (−6.7)	23.2 (−4.9)	27.9 (−2.3)	33.1 (0.6)	41.8 (5.4)	50.1 (10.1)	57.7 (14.3)	53.7 (12.1)	44.5 (6.9)	32.7 (0.4)	23.7 (−4.6)	18.0 (−7.8)	35.5 (2.0)
Mean minimum °F (°C)	2.4 (−16.4)	8.3 (−13.2)	14.2 (−9.9)	19.3 (−7.1)	27.6 (−2.4)	35.0 (1.7)	46.7 (8.2)	41.9 (5.5)	30.4 (−0.9)	17.5 (−8.1)	7.3 (−13.7)	−1.8 (−18.8)	−4.9 (−20.5)
Record low °F (°C)	−35 (−37)	−28 (−33)	−5 (−21)	10 (−12)	17 (−8)	26 (−3)	28 (−2)	29 (−2)	16 (−9)	2 (−17)	−6 (−21)	−35 (−37)	−35 (−37)
Average precipitation inches (mm)	0.92 (23)	0.83 (21)	1.16 (29)	0.96 (24)	1.08 (27)	0.56 (14)	0.20 (5.1)	0.19 (4.8)	0.27 (6.9)	0.63 (16)	0.66 (17)	0.93 (24)	8.39 (211.8)
Average snowfall inches (cm)	2.9 (7.4)	1.2 (3.0)	1.8 (4.6)	0.8 (2.0)	0.0 (0.0)	0.0 (0.0)	0.0 (0.0)	0.0 (0.0)	0.0 (0.0)	0.0 (0.0)	0.8 (2.0)	4.1 (10)	11.6 (29)
Average precipitation days (≥ 0.01 in)	6.6	6.5	6.4	6.5	6.5	3.0	1.9	1.6	2.0	3.6	4.4	6.6	55.6
Average snowy days (≥ 0.1 in)	1.9	1.4	1.0	0.6	0.0	0.0	0.0	0.0	0.0	0.1	0.9	3.0	8.9
Source 1: NOAA
Source 2: National Weather Service

== Demographics ==
Historical population
Census	Pop.	Note	%±
2010	171		—
2020	210		22.8%
U.S. Decennial Census
