= Unionville, Nevada =

Census-designated place in Pershing County, Nevada, United States

- Census-designated place
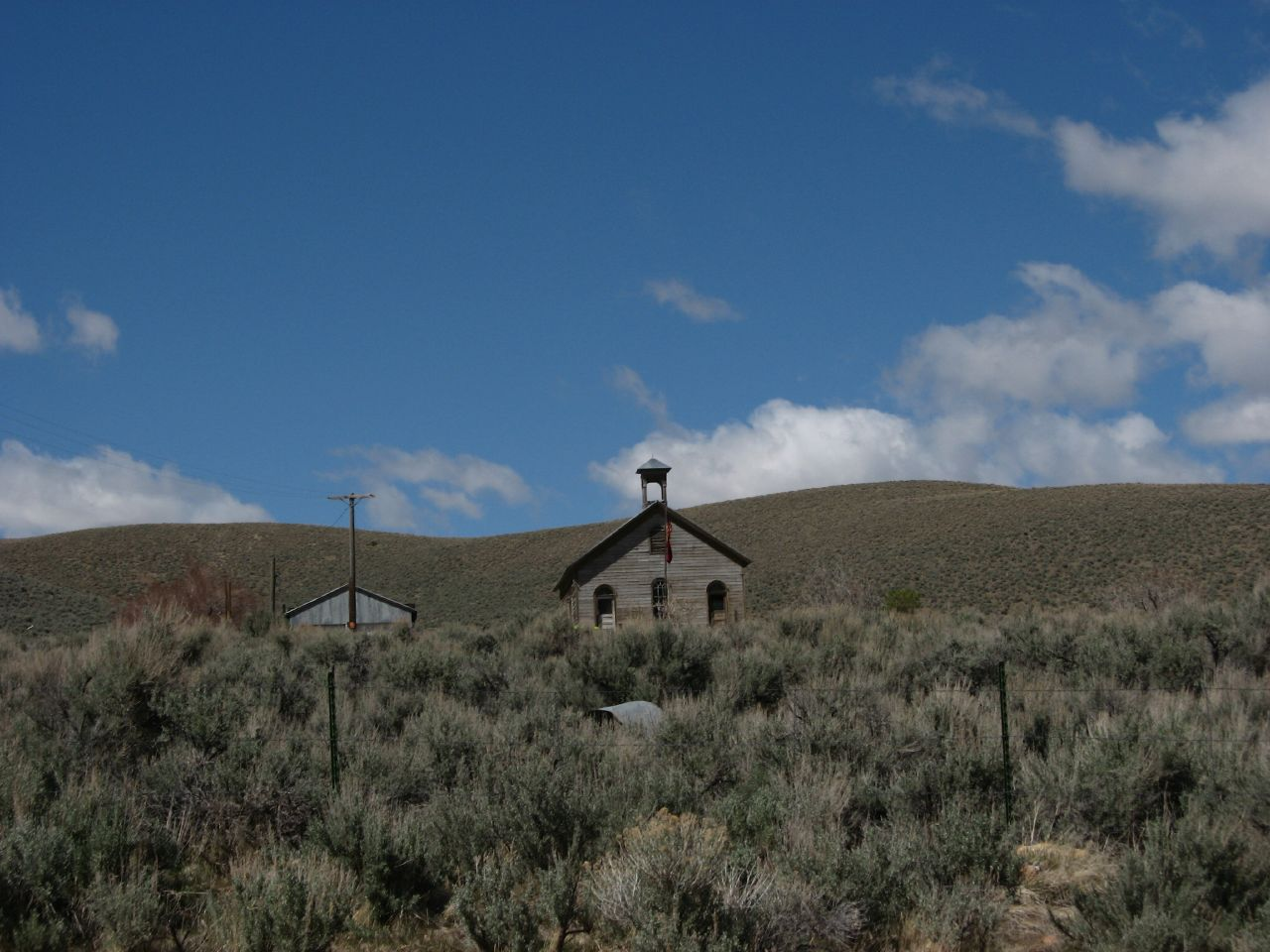
- Unionville, 2007

- Location within Nevada
- Coordinates: 40°26′45″N 118°07′20″W
- Country: United States
- State: Nevada
- District: Pershing County

Area
  - Total: 0.78 sq mi (2.01 km^{2})
  - Land: 0.78 sq mi (2.01 km^{2})
  - Water: 0 sq mi (0.00 km^{2})
- Elevation: 5,050.0 ft (1,539.25 m)

Population (2020)
  - Total: 27
  - Density: 34.9/sq mi (13.46/km^{2})
- Time zone: UTC-8 (Pacific)
  - Summer (DST): UTC-7 (PDT)
- FIPS code: 32-76400

Nevada Historical Marker
- Reference no.: 145

Unionville is a census-designated place in Pershing County, Nevada, located south of Interstate 80 and just west of State Route 400 on Unionville Road, with the population as of the 2020 census being 27. The town's best years were during the 1870s, when it was an active mining and prospecting town serving the surrounding hilly region. For a brief time, Samuel Langhorne Clemens (better known as Mark Twain) lived there and prospected, but left without having had much success. Currently, the hamlet consists of a single business – a tourist inn – and a few small houses clustered along or near the gravel roadway which permits vehicular ingress and egress. The nearest paved road, an extension of this gravel road, is about 7 miles (11 km) to the east. The nearest services of any sort, other than those available at the inn, are approximately one hour's drive away.

== History ==
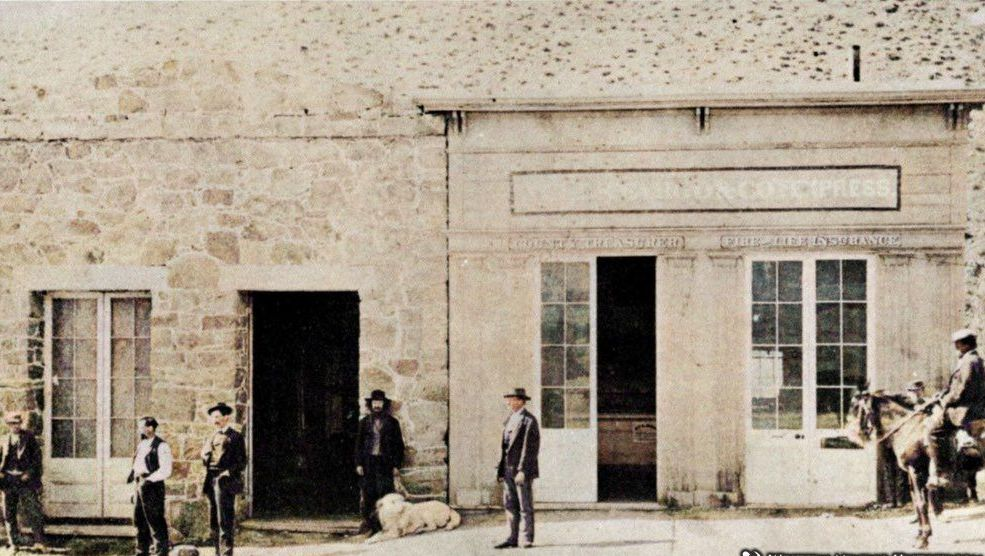
Wells-Fargo office in Unionville 1870s

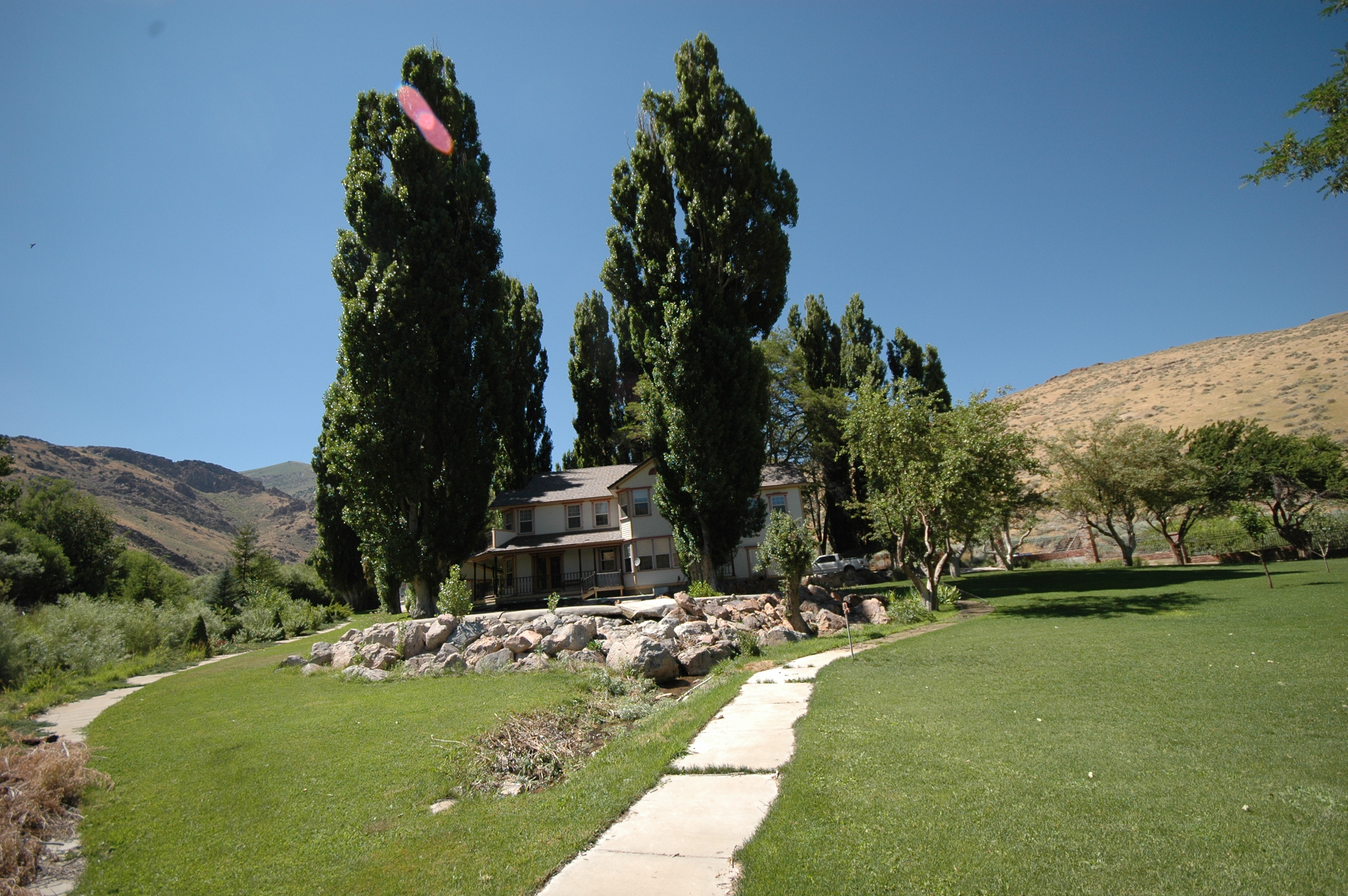
House in Unionville, 2006

Now in Pershing County, Unionville was the original county seat for Humboldt County, serving in that capacity from its founding in July 1861 until the seat was relocated to Winnemucca in 1873. The big mining boom at Unionville occurred between 1863 and 1870. During that time, the population was reported to be as high as 1,500 persons. Mark Twain arrived in Unionville with the intention of prospecting for silver in 1862, describing the town as consisting of "eleven cabins and a liberty-pole". As is common in most mining communities, after the boom, the town experienced a decline soon afterwards. By 1870, it was discovered that there was little rich ore in the district. The decline was speeded by the completion of the Central Pacific Railroad through the Humboldt valley, and the establishment of Winnemucca as a major trading and shipping center.

There is now no formal government as such in the hamlet of Unionville, which is unincorporated. Some abandoned buildings such as Twain's cabin and a one-room schoolhouse remain standing in various stages of disrepair, but there is no ongoing, active effort to preserve any of these. Unionville is frequently referred to as a ghost town. Just north of the town's limits is a cemetery, which may still be used for occasional burials. A few hundred yards farther into the county, there is a fork in the main road. Aerial photographs reveal a large cemented foundation upon which stand two large structures, along with two or three smaller structures of relatively recent vintage. These structures are Unionville's local garbage dumping grounds.

== Demographics ==
Historical population
Census	Pop.	Note	%±
2020	27		—
U.S. Decennial Census

=== Ethnic diversity ===
Paul Laveaga, one of Unionville's more prominent citizens, was born in Mexico in 1841. He was the only member of his family to leave Mexico for Nevada. When he came to the state in 1866, he worked for wages and mined in Unionville. In 1868, Laveaga opened up a lodging house and restaurant which he ran until 1884 when he left for Winnemucca. In addition, he served as post master in Unionville for many years. Laveaga was a successful businessman and well-respected by his fellow citizens. In 1874, he was elected to the state assembly where he served four terms. Laveaga also served as the Humboldt county treasurer for eight years. Although he would eventually leave Unionville for the more prominent town of Winnemucca, Laveaga's success in the state of Nevada stemmed from his initial settlement in Unionville.

Like other mining towns in the American West, Chinese laborers resided in Unionville and mined in the American Canyon. The town's white inhabitants were quick to exhibit virulent anti-Chinese racism. The Democratic party newspaper in town, the Humboldt Register, equated the Chinese to "baboons or trained monkeys." In addition to anti-Chinese racism, a segment of Unionville's population, organized as the Anti-Chinese League, was responsible for forcibly expelling the Chinese population in the middle of January 1869. The Chinese, outnumbered and outgunned, did nothing to resist expulsion, nor did any of the town's religious or fraternal organizations attempt to stop it. The 35 Chinese males that resided in town were put on a wagon and taken twenty-five miles to Mill City, the nearest station on the Central Pacific Railway.

Eighteen men were indicted for this crime in federal court: W S Bonnifield, William Woolcock, Peter Woolcock, Samuel Fiefield, Samuel J Bonnifield, John Cavanaugh, John McCanney, William Bush, Lewis Moore, George Holden, Jerry Job, O. Jewett, Robert Henderson, John J. Hill, “John Doe” Waitz, Lewis Dunn, “John Doe” Harrison, and James Hamblyn. Of these, only two were arrested, Lewis Dunn and John J Hill. Lewis Dunn was released under a writ of habeas corpus by District Judge George G. Berry. John J. Hill was similarly released by the judge of the U. S. District Court, Alex W. Baldwin. The indictment noted that a number of other men were involved, but that their names were unknown.

This was a significant event which provides an early example of the attitudes of white Nevadans toward the Chinese. Anti-Chinese agitation and forced expulsion emerged in other communities throughout Nevada and the Far West.

The events of 1869 did not permanently dissuade some Chinese from remaining in the county. After Unionville declined as a white mining center, scattered Chinese returned to mine the surrounding environs. Because water was at premium in the area, Chinese miners used rockers rather than sluices at their sites. As late as 1905 there were still Chinese miners that continued to work in the American Canyon, but by that time they were quite elderly and numbered fewer than ten.

== See also ==
- List of census-designated places in Nevada
