= Pershing County, Nevada =

County in Nevada, United States

- County
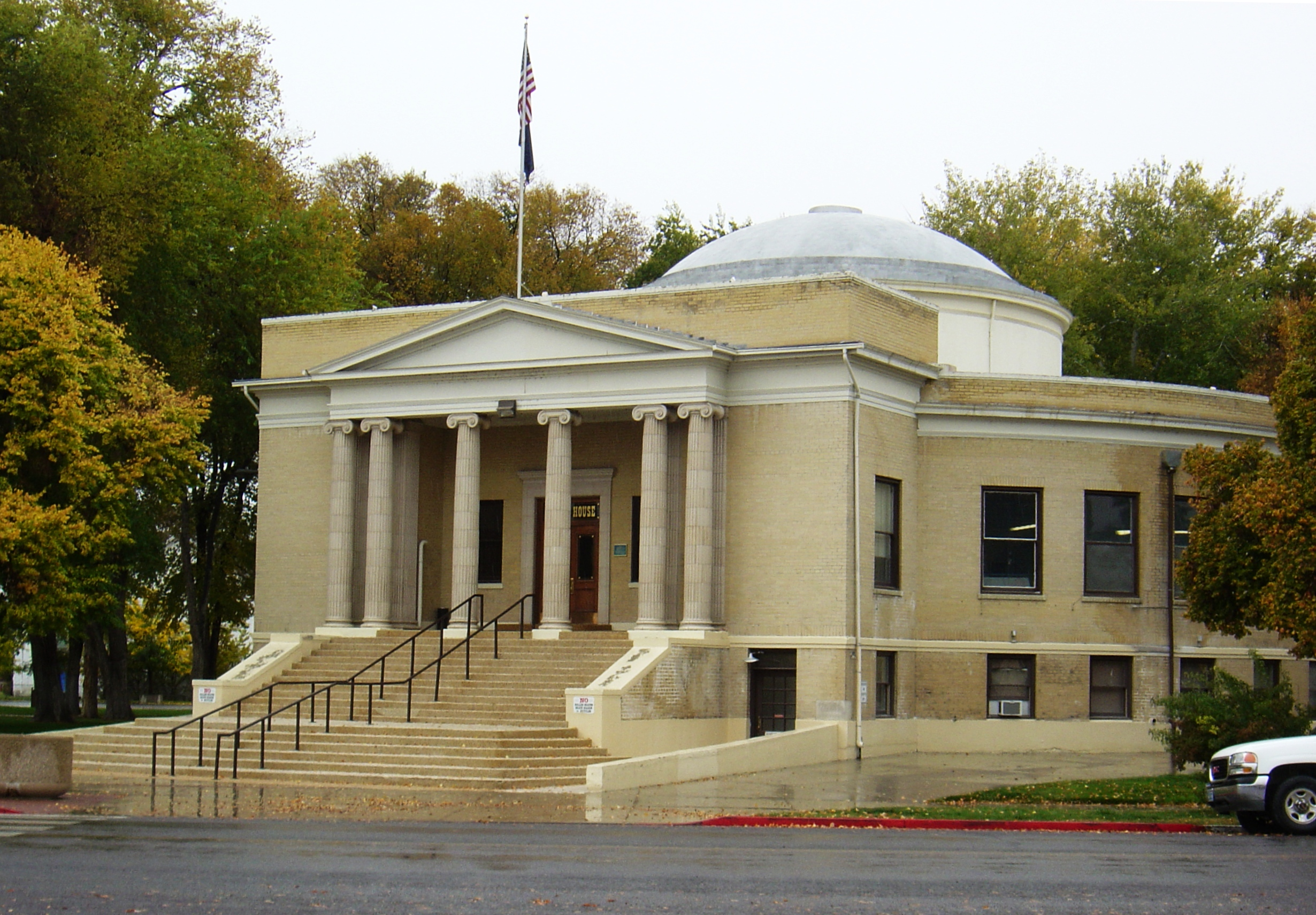
- Pershing County Courthouse in Lovelock

- Flag

- Location within the U.S. state of Nevada
- Coordinates: 40°27′N 118°24′W
- Country: United States
- State: Nevada
- Founded: March 18, 1919; 107 years ago
- Named for: John J. Pershing
- Seat: Lovelock
- Largest city: Lovelock

Area
  - Total: 6,067 sq mi (15,710 km^{2})
  - Land: 6,037 sq mi (15,640 km^{2})
  - Water: 31 sq mi (80 km^{2}) 0.5%

Population (2020)
  - Total: 6,650
  - Estimate (2025): 6,421 ▼
  - Density: 1.10/sq mi (0.425/km^{2})
- Time zone: UTC−8 (Pacific)
  - Summer (DST): UTC−7 (PDT)
- Congressional district: 2nd
- Website: pershingcounty.net

Pershing County is a county in the U.S. state of Nevada. As of the 2020 census, the population was 6,650. Its county seat is Lovelock. The county is listed as Nevada Historical Marker 17. The marker is at the courthouse in Lovelock.

The Black Rock Desert, location for the annual Burning Man event, is partially in the county.

== Etymology ==
The county was named after army general John J. Pershing (1860–1948). It was formed from Humboldt County on March 18, 1919, and the final county to be established in Nevada.

== History ==
The Humboldt Trail passed through Pershing County, bringing 165,000 immigrants in the 1840s and 1850s, who named the area Big Valley. Travelers would stop here for water and grass before crossing the Forty Mile Desert, regarded as the most difficult part of the trail.

=== Mining history ===
Mining began in the 1860s in the Humboldt Mining District. The Star and Buena Vista districts were discovered shortly after, making Unionville the county's mining center. A smelter was built in Oreana. Gold placer deposits were discovered in American Valley, Spring Valley, and Dry Gulch in 1881. These operations worked successfully for about ten years.

The Arizona Mine was discovered in 1862 near Unionville, and sustained operations continued until 1880. There was a possible exploration for in 1963 from the chance of a large deposit of silver.

==== Humboldt District ====
The Humboldt District (also known as the Imlay or Eldorado District) was on the north and west ends of the Humboldt Range. It was organized in 1860, the first mining district in present-day Pershing County. Humboldt City was established in 1863, with a population of 500. The Imlay Mine yielded a substantial yet unknown amount of silver, which was shipped. The Star Peak mine yielded $130,000 until 1935, all of silver and gold.

The district produced 35,483 ounces of gold from 1932 to 1959.

=== Railroad ===
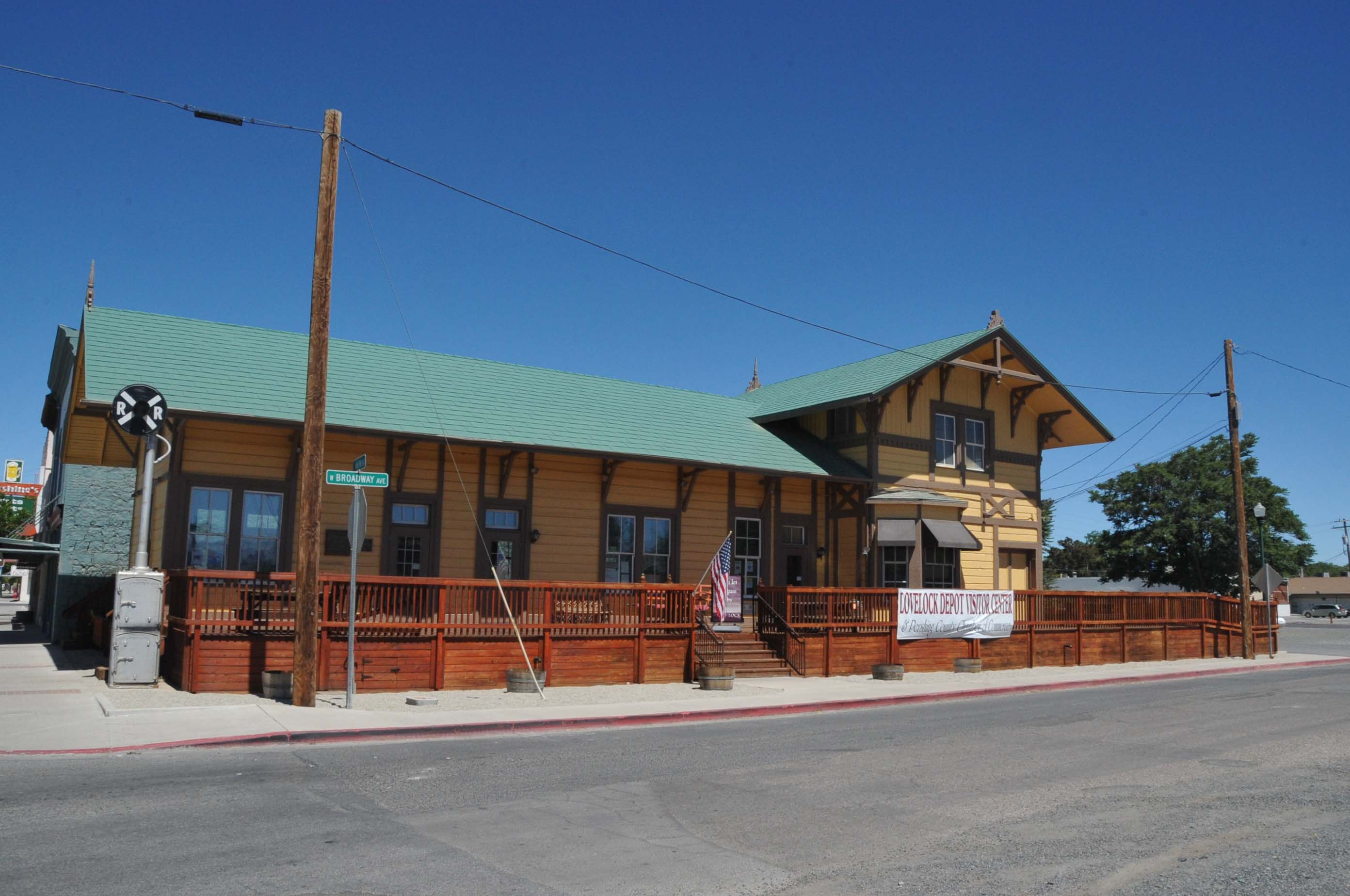
Lovelock station from the Central Pacific Railroad

In 1868, the Central Pacific Railroad was built in the county, running through Lovelock. The Lovelock station was built in the winter of 1879, and was a gateway to Lovelock for the rest of the nineteenth and most of the twentieth centuries. It was expanded in 1917, but abandoned in the 1990s. It was purchased by the City of Lovelock.

=== Post-1900 ===
A rivalry with Humboldt County influenced the decision to build the Pershing County Courthouse.

== Geography ==
According to the U.S. Census Bureau, the county has a total area of 6,067 square miles (15,710 km^{2}), of which 6,037 square miles (15,640 km^{2}) is land and 31 square miles (80 km^{2}) (0.5%) is water. The tallest and most topographically prominent mountain in Pershing County is Star Peak at 9,840 ft (3,000 m).

Pershing County is generally less rugged than most of Nevada, and is typical to the Great Basin with north-trending mountain ranges, with dry valleys separating them.

=== Major highways ===
- I-80
- US 95
- SR 397
- SR 398
- SR 399
- SR 400
- SR 401
- SR 447
- SR 854
- SR 856
- SR 860

=== Adjacent counties ===
- Washoe County – west
- Humboldt County – north
- Lander County – east
- Churchill County – south

=== National protected area ===
- Black Rock Desert-High Rock Canyon Emigrant Trails National Conservation Area (part)

== Demographics ==
Historical population
Census	Pop.	Note	%±
1920	2,803		—
1930	2,652		−5.4%
1940	2,713		2.3%
1950	3,103		14.4%
1960	3,199		3.1%
1970	2,670		−16.5%
1980	3,408		27.6%
1990	4,336		27.2%
2000	6,693		54.4%
2010	6,753		0.9%
2020	6,650		−1.5%
2025 (est.)	6,421	▼	−3.4%
U.S. Decennial Census; 1790-1960 1900-1990; 1990-2000 2010-2020

=== Racial and ethnic composition ===
Pershing County, Nevada – Racial and ethnic composition Note: the US Census treats Hispanic/Latino as an ethnic category. This table excludes Latinos from the racial categories and assigns them to a separate category. Hispanics/Latinos may be of any race.
Race / Ethnicity (NH = Non-Hispanic)	Pop 1980	Pop 1990	Pop 2000	Pop 2010	Pop 2020	% 1980	% 1990	% 2000	% 2010	% 2020
White alone (NH)	2,803	3,442	4,663	4,605	4,197	82.25%	79.38%	69.67%	68.19%	63.11%
Black or African American alone (NH)	3	13	356	251	322	0.09%	0.30%	5.32%	3.72%	4.84%
Native American or Alaska Native alone (NH)	190	192	203	173	198	5.58%	4.43%	3.03%	2.56%	2.98%
Asian alone (NH)	14	25	34	87	109	0.41%	0.58%	0.51%	1.29%	1.64%
Native Hawaiian or Pacific Islander alone (NH)	x	x	13	7	8	x	x	0.19%	0.10%	0.12%
Other race alone (NH)	13	2	4	4	21	0.38%	0.05%	0.06%	0.06%	0.32%
Mixed race or Multiracial (NH)	x	x	126	118	296	x	x	1.88%	1.75%	4.45%
Hispanic or Latino (any race)	385	662	1,294	1,508	1,499	11.30%	15.27%	19.33%	22.33%	22.54%
Total	3,408	4,336	6,693	6,753	6,650	100.00%	100.00%	100.00%	100.00%	100.00%

=== 2020 census ===
As of the 2020 census, the county had a population of 6,650. The median age was 42.5 years. 18.6% of residents were under the age of 18 and 15.8% of residents were 65 years of age or older. For every 100 females there were 181.2 males, and for every 100 females age 18 and over there were 203.0 males age 18 and over. 0.0% of residents lived in urban areas, while 100.0% lived in rural areas.

The racial makeup of the county was 67.0% White, 4.8% Black or African American, 3.5% American Indian and Alaska Native, 1.7% Asian, 0.2% Native Hawaiian and Pacific Islander, 13.9% from some other race, and 8.9% from two or more races. Hispanic or Latino residents of any race comprised 22.5% of the population.

There were 1,929 households in the county, of which 32.2% had children under the age of 18 living with them and 21.3% had a female householder with no spouse or partner present. About 27.3% of all households were made up of individuals and 12.7% had someone living alone who was 65 years of age or older.

There were 2,278 housing units, of which 15.3% were vacant. Among occupied housing units, 67.8% were owner-occupied and 32.2% were renter-occupied. The homeowner vacancy rate was 2.6% and the rental vacancy rate was 10.2%.

=== 2010 census ===
At the 2010 census, there were 6,753 people, 2,018 households, and 1,375 families living in the county. The population density was 1.1 inhabitants per square mile (0.42/km^{2}). There were 2,464 housing units at an average density of 0.4 per square mile (0.15/km^{2}). The racial makeup of the county was 81.9% white, 3.7% black or African American, 3.2% American Indian, 1.3% Asian, 0.1% Pacific islander, 6.7% from other races, and 3.1% from two or more races. Those of Hispanic or Latino origin made up 22.3% of the population. In terms of ancestry, 19.5% were German, 16.8% were Irish, 13.8% were English, 5.1% were Italian, and 4.4% were American.

Of the 2,018 households, 31.6% had children under the age of 18 living with them, 51.9% were married couples living together, 9.1% had a female householder with no husband present, 31.9% were non-families, and 26.6% of households were made up of individuals. The average household size was 2.51 and the average family size was 3.02. The median age was 41.0 years.

The median household income was $56,491 and the median family income was $61,410. Males had a median income of $51,333 versus $28,871 for females. The per capita income for the county was $17,519. About 10.2% of families and 13.7% of the population were below the poverty line, including 23.0% of those under age 18 and 2.7% of those age 65 or over.

=== 2000 census ===
At the 2000 census there were 6,693 people, 1,962 households, and 1,383 families living in the county. The population density was 1 person per square mile (0.39 person/km^{2}). There were 2,389 housing units at an average density of 0.39 units per square mile (0.15/km^{2}). The racial makeup of the county was 77.69% White, 5.35% Black or African American, 3.42% Native American, 0.63% Asian, 0.22% Pacific Islander, 9.38% from other races, and 3.30% from two or more races. 19.33% of the population were Hispanic or Latino of any race. Of the 1,962 households 38.40% had children under the age of 18 living with them, 57.20% were married couples living together, 7.30% had a female householder with no husband present, and 29.50% were non-families. 24.30% of households were one person and 8.60% were one person aged 65 or older. The average household size was 2.69 and the average family size was 3.22.

The age distribution was 25.70% under the age of 18, 8.50% from 18 to 24, 36.00% from 25 to 44, 22.10% from 45 to 64, and 7.80% 65 or older. The median age was 34 years. For every 100 females there were 158.80 males. For every 100 females age 18 and over, there were 182.10 males.

The median household income was $40,670 and the median family income was $46,268. Males had a median income of $34,417 versus $24,301 for females. The per capita income for the county was $16,589. About 10.20% of families and 11.40% of the population were below the poverty line, including 14.20% of those under age 18 and 5.60% of those age 65 or over.

== Communities ==
=== Cities ===
- Lovelock (county seat)

=== Census-designated places ===
- Grass Valley
- Humboldt River Ranch
- Imlay
- Unionville

=== Unincorporated communities ===
Many of the following places are considered ghost towns.

- Dun Glen/Chafey
- Etna
- Humboldt City
- Mazuma
- Mill City
- Rochester
- Scossa
- Seven Troughs
- Star City
- Vernon

== Politics ==
Pershing County, like the rest of rural Nevada, is overwhelmingly Republican, especially in more recent elections. The last Democrat to carry the county was Lyndon Johnson in 1964. In 2024, the county gave over three-quarters of its vote to Donald Trump, the largest percentage ever for a Republican presidential nominee.

United States presidential election results for Pershing County, Nevada
Year	Republican		Democratic		Third party(ies)	
Year	No.	%	No.	%	No.	%
1920	563	56.53%	389	39.06%	44	4.42%
1924	308	36.07%	164	19.20%	382	44.73%
1928	543	54.57%	452	45.43%	0	0.00%
1932	247	23.77%	792	76.23%	0	0.00%
1936	269	23.81%	861	76.19%	0	0.00%
1940	594	46.05%	696	53.95%	0	0.00%
1944	538	50.66%	524	49.34%	0	0.00%
1948	677	53.65%	541	42.87%	44	3.49%
1952	919	63.78%	522	36.22%	0	0.00%
1956	895	61.43%	562	38.57%	0	0.00%
1960	648	47.51%	716	52.49%	0	0.00%
1964	486	39.71%	738	60.29%	0	0.00%
1968	567	46.74%	466	38.42%	180	14.84%
1972	853	70.03%	365	29.97%	0	0.00%
1976	635	46.93%	633	46.78%	85	6.28%
1980	877	68.41%	311	24.26%	94	7.33%
1984	956	71.88%	333	25.04%	41	3.08%
1988	867	62.11%	458	32.81%	71	5.09%
1992	643	41.06%	467	29.82%	456	29.12%
1996	743	47.36%	565	36.01%	261	16.63%
2000	1,221	67.76%	476	26.42%	105	5.83%
2004	1,341	69.95%	538	28.06%	38	1.98%
2008	1,075	58.55%	673	36.66%	88	4.79%
2012	1,167	61.94%	632	33.55%	85	4.51%
2016	1,403	70.79%	430	21.70%	149	7.52%
2020	1,731	74.61%	547	23.58%	42	1.81%
2024	1,764	76.43%	496	21.49%	48	2.08%

United States Senate election results for Pershing County, Nevada1
Year	Republican		Democratic		Third party(ies)	
Year	No.	%	No.	%	No.	%
2024	1,618	70.62%	519	22.65%	154	6.72%

== See also ==
- Pershing County Courthouse
- National Register of Historic Places listings in Pershing County, Nevada
