= Nevada State Route 48 =

Former state highway in Nevada, United States

State Route 48 is the previous designation for State Routes 399 and 854 from Interstate 80 (U.S. Route 40, State Route 1) at Lovelock northwest to near Eagle Picher Mine, then northwest along an unimproved road to meet former State Route 49 east of Gerlach.
