= Nevada State Route 854 =

Highway in Nevada

State Route 854
- Lone Mountain Road, Western Avenue
- SR 854 highlighted in red

Route information
- Maintained by NDOT
- Length: 4.120 mi (6.630 km)
- Existed: 1976–present

Major junctions
- West end: SR 399 near Lovelock
- East end: SR 398 in Lovelock

Location
- Country: United States
- State: Nevada
- County: Pershing

Highway system
- Nevada State Highway System; Interstate; US; State; Pre‑1976; Scenic
| ← SR 844 | → SR 856 |

State Route 854 (SR 854) is a state highway in Pershing County, Nevada serving the vicinity of Lovelock. The route comprised a portion of former State Route 48.

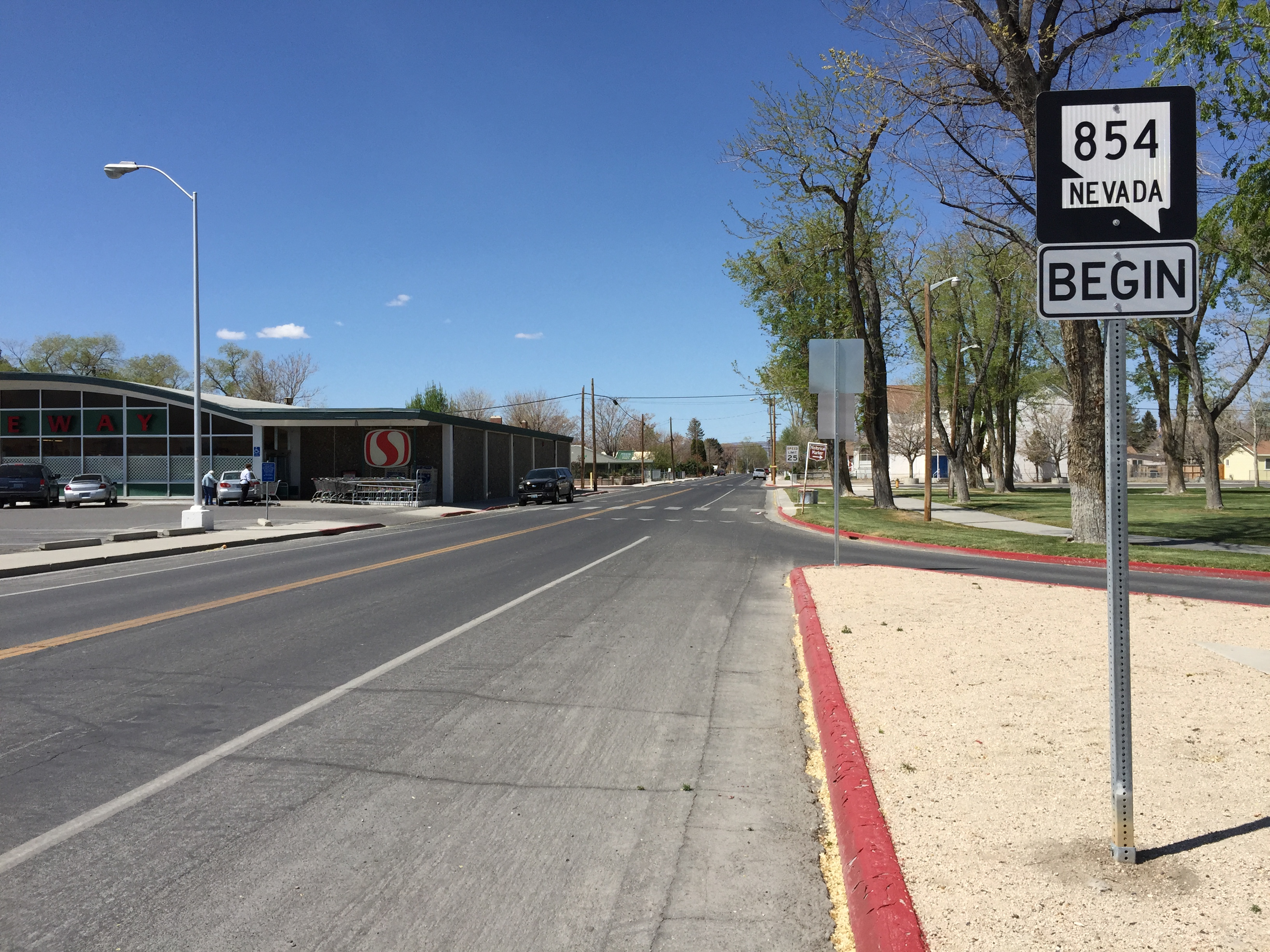
View at the east end of SR 854 in Lovelock, looking west

== Route description ==
State Route 854 begins northwest of Lovelock at an intersection with Pitt Road/Eagle Picher Mine Road (SR 399). From there, the two-lane highway travels south along Lone Mountain Road for about 1.6 miles (2.6 km), passing a local cemetery. The route then turns east and heads through farmlands towards downtown Lovelock. Entering the city limits at Jamestown Road, the road now follows Western Avenue through residential areas. SR 854 passes by the Pershing County Courthouse and then turns northeast on Dartmouth Avenue to terminate at an intersection with Main Street (SR 398) in downtown Lovelock.

== History ==
SR 854 was a part of former State Route 48.

SR 854 was originally designated as the easternmost end of the much longer State Route 48. SR 48 followed the current highway away from Lovelock, then turned westward along present-day State Route 399 passing near the Seven Troughs Mine area to terminate at State Route 34 at Gerlach. That route was designated by 1935. On July 1, 1976, this section of SR 48 was reassigned to State Route 854 as part of the renumbering of Nevada's state highway system.

== Major intersections ==
The entire route is in Pershing County.

| Location | mi | km | Destinations | Notes |
|---|---|---|---|---|
| | 0.00 | 0.00 | SR 399 (Pitt Road, Eagle Picher Mine Road) | Western terminus |
| Lovelock | 4.12 | 6.63 | SR 398 (Main Street) | Eastern terminus |
1.000 mi = 1.609 km; 1.000 km = 0.621 mi
