= List of highways numbered 399 =

The following highways are numbered 399:

== Canada ==
- Manitoba Provincial Road 399
- Quebec Route 399

== Japan ==
- Japan National Route 399

== United States ==
- U.S. Route 399 (former)
- Arkansas Highway 399
- Florida State Road 399
- Louisiana Highway 399
- Nevada State Route 399
- New York State Route 399 (former)
- Tennessee State Route 399
- Texas State Highway Spur 399
- Virginia State Route 399

Preceded by 398	Lists of highways 399	Succeeded by 400
