= Interstate 80 Business (Lovelock, Nevada) =

Interstate branch serving Lovelock, Nevada, USA

Interstate 80 Business
- Cornell Avenue
- BL-80 highlighted in red

Route information
- Business route of I-80
- Maintained by NDOT
- Length: 1.99 mi (3.20 km)
- Existed: 2000–present

Major junctions
- South end: I-80 / US 95 / SR 396 in Lovelock
- SR 398 in Lovelock; SR 396 / SR 856 in Lovelock
- North end: I-80 / US 95 / SR 856 in Lovelock

Location
- Country: United States
- State: Nevada
- Counties: Pershing

Highway system
- Interstate Highway System; Main; Auxiliary; Suffixed; Business; Future; Nevada State Highway System; Interstate; US; State; Pre‑1976; Scenic

Interstate 80 Business (BL-80) is an interstate business route in Pershing County, Nevada. Serving the city of Lovelock along Cornell Avenue, BL-80 is also cosigned along portions of two other state highways through the city, State Route 396 (SR 396) from I-80 exit 105 to SR 856 at Airport Road and SR 856 from SR 396 at Upper Valley Road to I-80 exit 107.

== Route description ==
BL-80 begins at the West Lovelock interchange with Interstate 80 and U.S. Route 95, concurrent with SR 396. The route follows Cornell Avenue north into the center of the town. The highway crosses Main Street (SR 398) and continues along Cornell Avenue to its end at a five-point intersection with 14th Street, Airport Road (SR 856) and Upper Valley Road near the Lovelock city limits. The highway heads northeast concurrent with SR 856 as Airport Road, crossing over Upper Valley Road, an irrigation canal, and the Union Pacific Railroad tracks before ending at a half-interchange with Interstate 80 and U.S. Route 95.

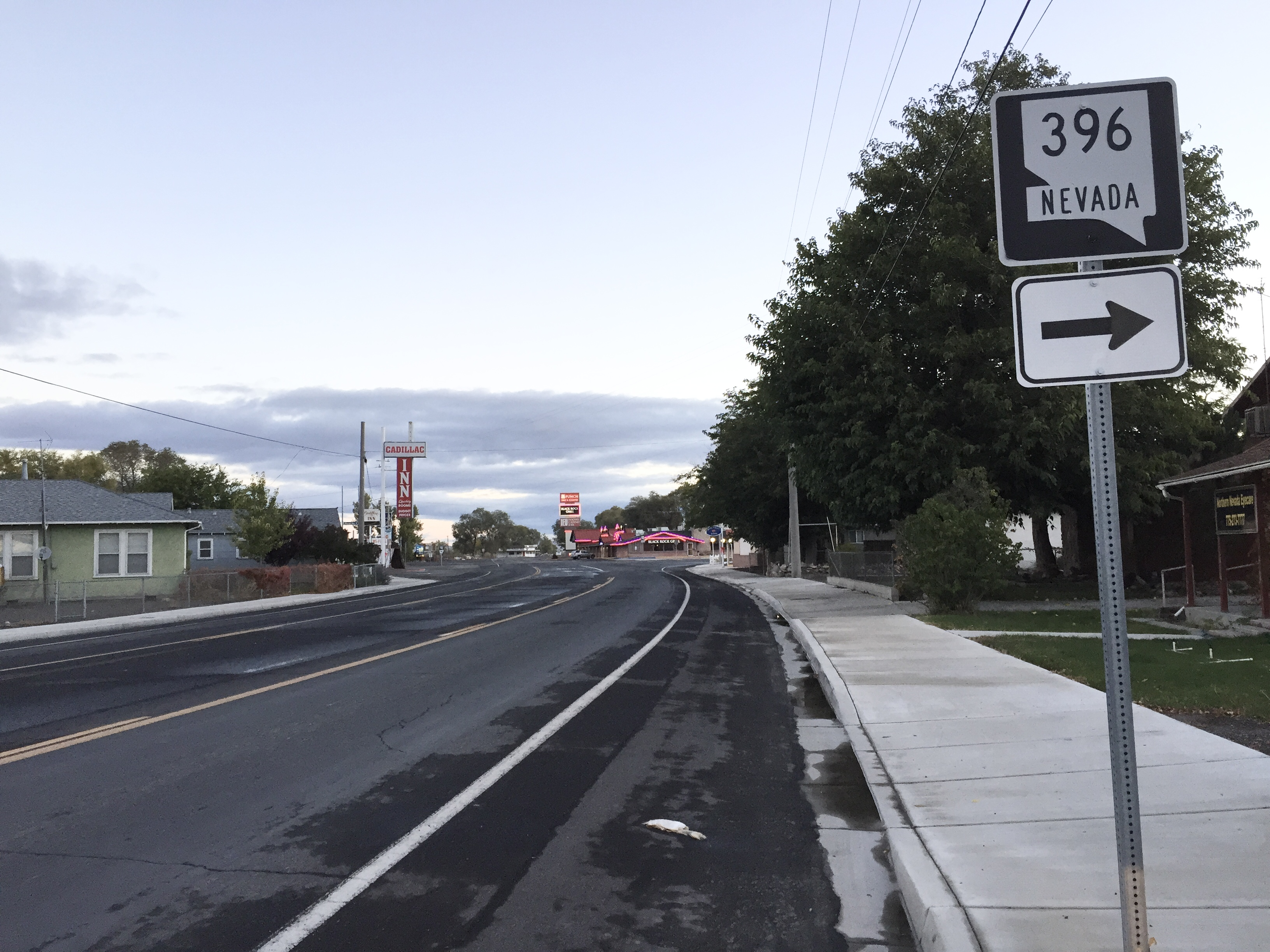
View along SR 396 near the north edge of Lovelock looking northbound

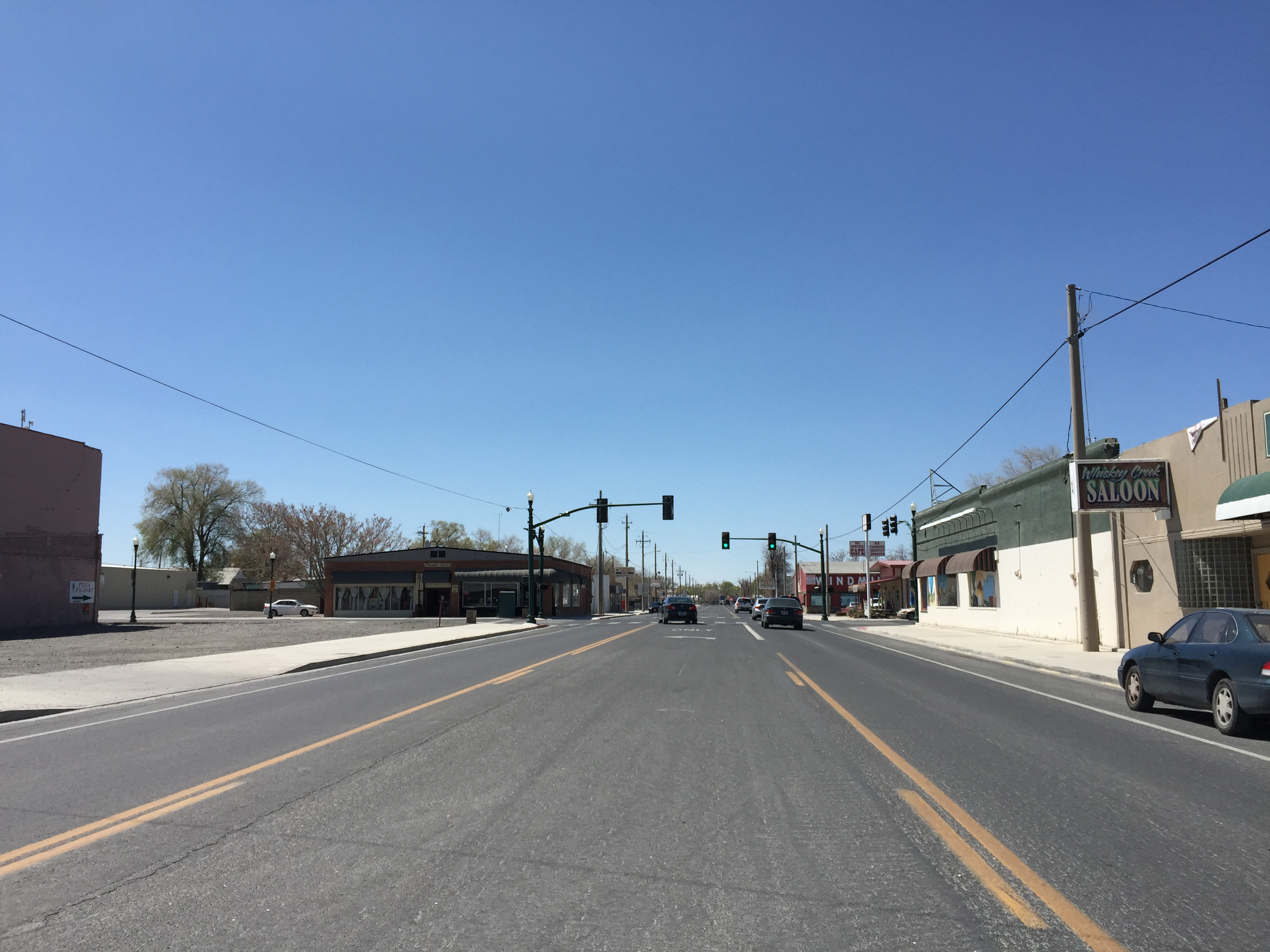
SR 396 in downtown Lovelock

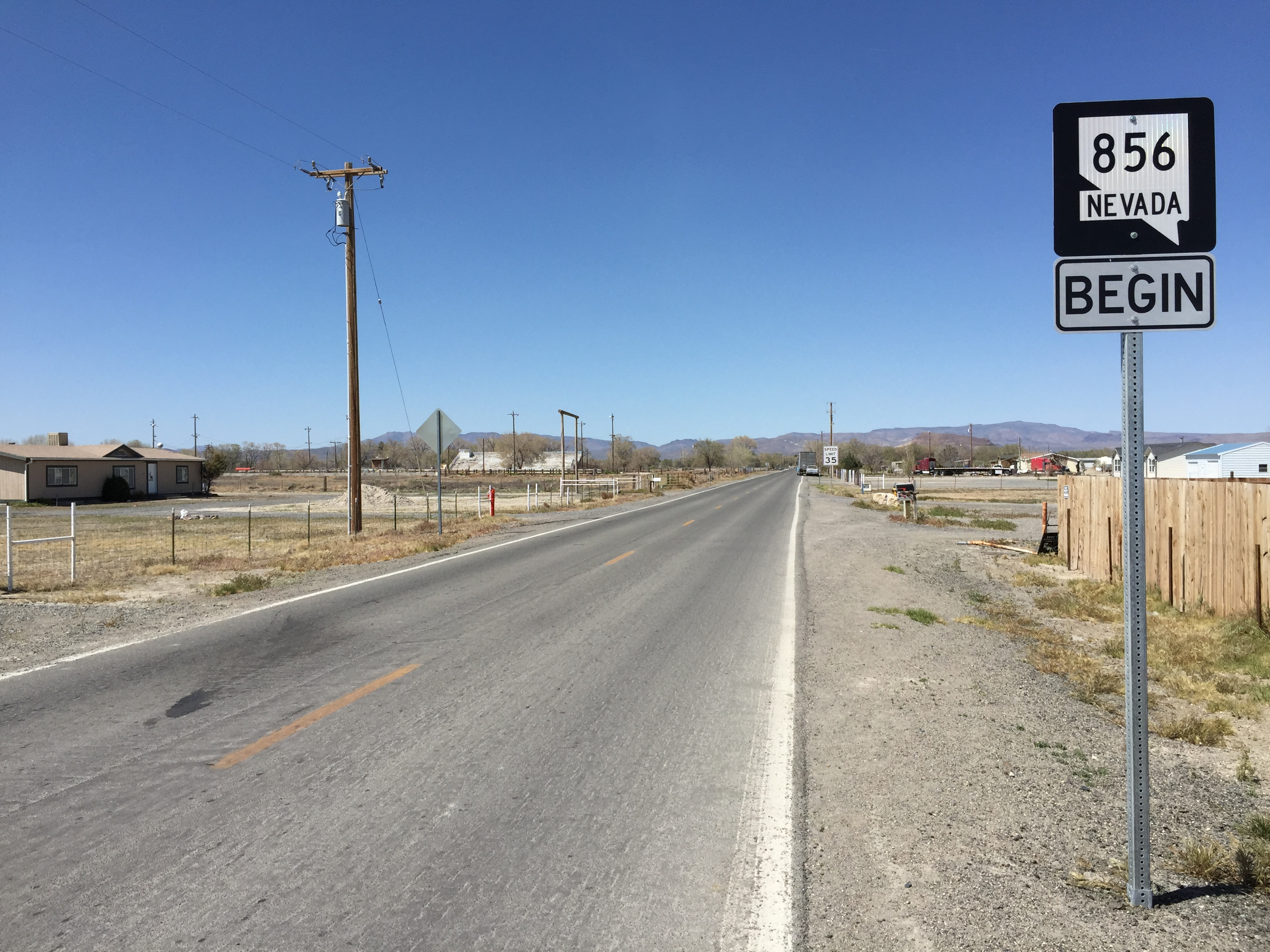
View at the east end of SR 856 looking west

== History ==
SR 396 originated as part of State Route 1, which later became US 40.

SR 396 was originally part of State Route 1 (SR 1). That route, designated with the passage of Nevada's first highway law in 1917, created a highway route across northern Nevada from California to Utah which passed through Lovelock. With the adoption of the U.S. Highway System in 1926, US 40 was eventually added concurrently with SR 1.

With the advent of the Interstate Highway system, Interstate 80 (I-80) gradually replaced US 40 across northern Nevada and was removed from Lovelock by 1976. Also around this time, the Nevada Department of Transportation was beginning to renumber its highways, eliminating the State Route 1 designation and redesignating the Lovelock portion on Cornell Avenue and Upper Valley Road as State Route 396. Even though the cross-state designations of US 40 and SR 1 had been eliminated by the mid-1970s, construction of the Interstate 80 freeway in Lovelock was not started until 1981, so through traffic continued to use SR 396 in the city.

Airport Road appears on maps as early as 1954, although it was not assigned a state highway number at the time. The road was assigned to State Route 856 on July 1, 1976.

The BL-80 designation was assigned in 2000.

== Major intersections ==
The entire route is in Lovelock, Pershing County.

mi	km	Destinations	Notes
0.00	0.00	I-80 west (Dwight D. Eisenhower Highway) / US 95 south – Fernley	Southern terminus; southern end of SR 396 concurrency
0.94	1.51	SR 398 (Main Street)	
1.29	2.08	SR 396 north (Upper Valley Road) / SR 856 east (Airport Road)	Northern end of SR 396 concurrency, western end of SR 856 concurrency
1.99	3.20	I-80 east (Dwight D. Eisenhower Highway) / US 95 north / SR 856 east – Winnemucca, Fernley	Northern terminus, eastern end of SR 856 concurrency
1.000 mi = 1.609 km; 1.000 km = 0.621 mi: Concurrency terminus
