= List of highways numbered 396 =

Route 396, or Highway 396, may refer to:

== Canada ==
- Manitoba Provincial Road 396
- Saskatchewan Highway 396 (former)

== Japan ==
- Japan National Route 396

== United States ==
- Arkansas Highway 396 (former)
- Maryland Route 396
  - Maryland Route 396A
- Nevada State Route 396
- New York:
  - New York State Route 396
  - County Route 396 (Erie County, New York)
- Puerto Rico Highway 396
- Tennessee State Route 396
- Texas:
  - Texas State Highway Loop 396
  - Farm to Market Road 396
  - Urban Road 396
- Virginia State Route 396

Preceded by 395	Lists of highways 396	Succeeded by 397
