= Nevada State Route 860 =

Highway in Nevada

State Route 860
- Derby Field Road
- SR 860 highlighted in red

Route information
- Maintained by NDOT
- Length: 1.888 mi (3.038 km)

Major junctions
- South end: Derby Field Road
- SR 397
- North end: Frontage Road

Location
- Country: United States
- State: Nevada
- County: Pershing

Highway system
- Nevada State Highway System; Interstate; US; State; Pre‑1976; Scenic
← SR 856	→ SR 877

State Route 860 (SR 860) is a state highway in southern Pershing County, Nevada. It runs 1.888 miles (3.038 km) from a cattle guard at Derby Field to a frontage road along Interstate 80 (FR PE01/Old U.S. Route 40). Between its two termini, SR 860 intersects with the southern terminus of SR 397.

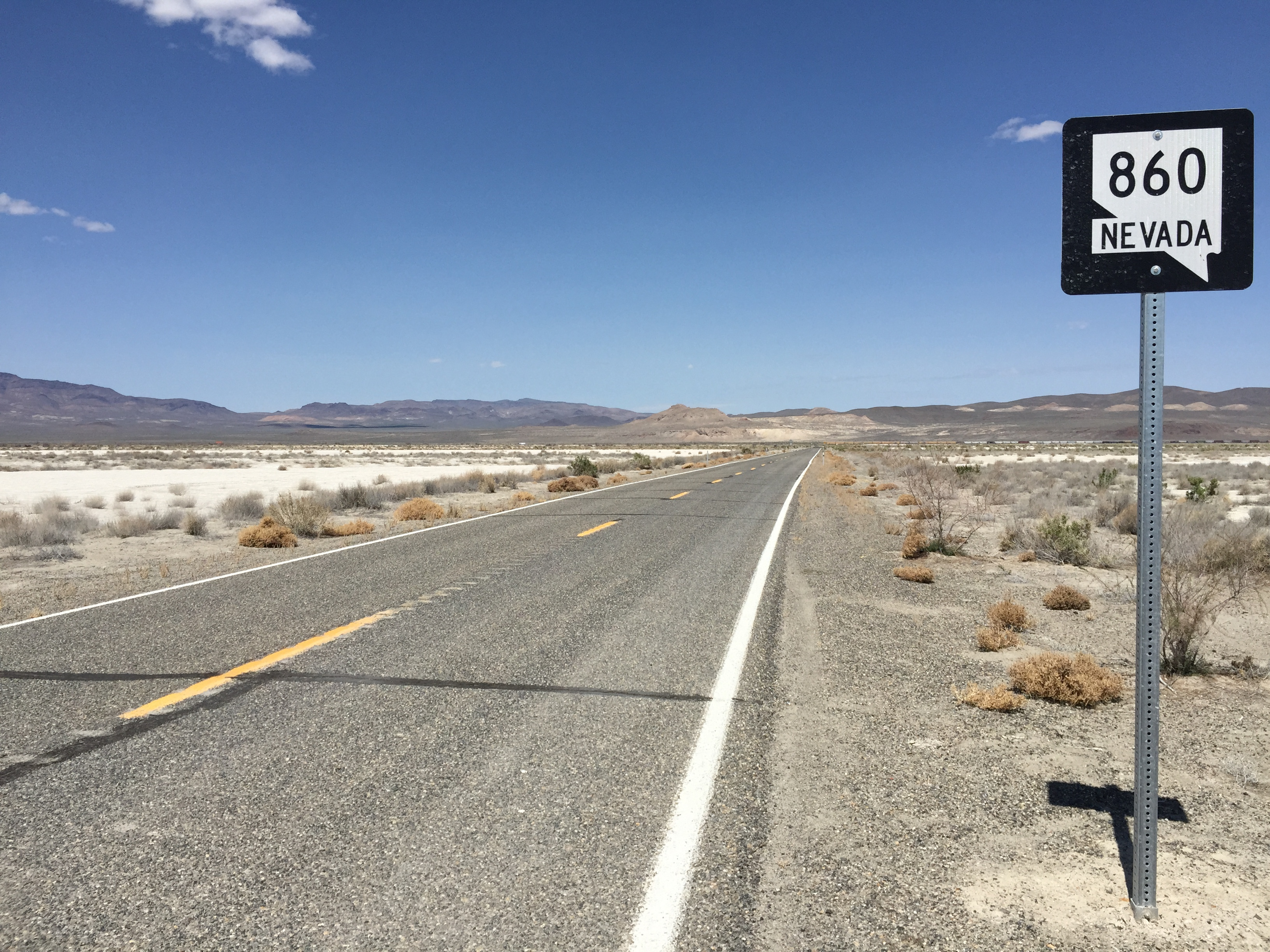
View at the south end of SR 860 looking north

== Major junctions ==
The entire route is in Pershing County.

Location	mi	km	Destinations	Notes
	0.000	0.000	Derby Field Road	Southern terminus
			SR 397 north (Westergard Road)	Southern terminus of SR 397
	1.888	3.038	Frontage Road	Northern terminus; former US 40
1.000 mi = 1.609 km; 1.000 km = 0.621 mi
