= List of highways numbered 400 =

The following highways are numbered 400:

== Australia ==
- Murray Valley Highway

== Canada ==
- Ontario Highway 400

== Croatia ==
- D400 road

== Cuba ==
- Vía Monumental (2–400)

== Ireland ==
- R400 road

== Japan ==
- Japan National Route 400

== Korea, South ==
- Capital Region Second Ring Expressway

== South Africa ==
- R400 road in the Eastern Cape

== Spain ==
- N-400 road

== Turkey ==
- D.400, a west–east state road in Turkey running from Datça, Muğla Province to Esendere at the Iranian border.

== United Kingdom ==
- A400 road in London
- B400 road (Chancery Lane)

== United States ==
- U.S. Route 400
- Arkansas Highway 400
- Florida State Road 400
- Georgia State Route 400
- Kentucky Route 400
- Louisiana Highway 400
- Maryland Route 400, a former state highway
- Nevada State Route 400
- New York:
  - New York State Route 400
  - County Route 400 (Erie County, New York)
- North Carolina Highway 400
- Pennsylvania Route 400 (official designation for Pennsylvania Route 380)
- Puerto Rico Highway 400
- South Carolina Highway 400
- Tennessee State Route 400
- Texas:
  - Texas State Highway Spur 400
  - Farm to Market Road 400
- Utah:
  - Road 400 (Cottonwood Canyon Road)
- Virginia State Route 400
  - Virginia State Route 400 (former)

Preceded by 399	Lists of highways 400	Succeeded by 401
