= List of highways numbered 398 =

The following highways are numbered 398:

== Canada ==
- Manitoba Provincial Road 398

== Japan ==
- Japan National Route 398

== United States ==
- Arkansas Highway 398
- Nevada State Route 398
- New York:
  - New York State Route 398 (former)
  - County Route 398 (Erie County, New York)
- Virginia State Route 398

Preceded by 397	Lists of highways 398	Succeeded by 399
