= Nevada State Route 856 =

Highway in Nevada

State Route 856
- Airport Road
- SR 856 highlighted in red

Route information
- Maintained by NDOT
- Length: 1.398 mi (2.250 km)
- Existed: 1976–present

Major junctions
- West end: SR 396 in Lovelock
- I-80 / US 95 in Lovelock
- East end: Reservoir Road near Lovelock

Location
- Country: United States
- State: Nevada
- County: Pershing

Highway system
- Nevada State Highway System; Interstate; US; State; Pre‑1976; Scenic
← SR 854	→ SR 860

State Route 856 (SR 856) is a state highway in Pershing County, Nevada serving Lovelock. The western portion of the route is also signed as Interstate 80 Business.

== Route description ==
State Route 856 begins as a continuation of Cornell Avenue (I-80 Bus.) at the intersection of Upper Valley Road (State Route 396) and 14th Street in northwestern Lovelock. The highway heads northeast as Airport Road, crossing over Upper Valley Road, an irrigation canal, and the Union Pacific Railroad tracks towards a half-interchange with Interstate 80 and U.S. Route 95. The route then continues east, crossing the Humboldt River and passing south of the now-abandoned Lovelock Airpark, reaching its terminus near the intersection of Reservoir Road.

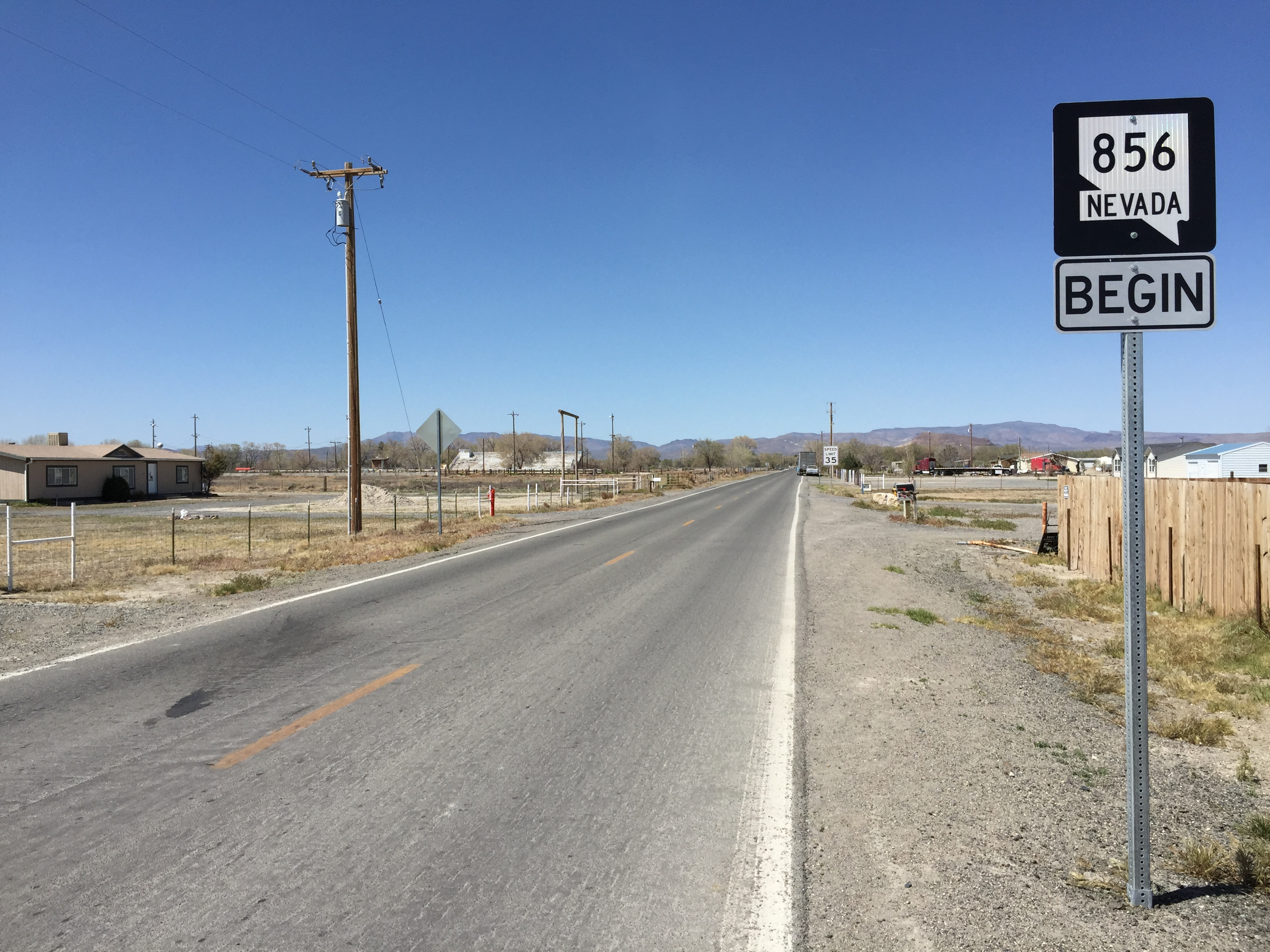
View at the east end of SR 856 looking west

Cornell Avenue, as a historic routing of U.S. Route 40–95, is designated as Interstate 80 Business through Lovelock. SR 856 carries the business loop from the northern end of Lovelock back to I-80, since Cornell Avenue does not intersect the interstate.

== History ==
Airport Road appears on maps as early as 1954, although it was not assigned a state highway number at the time. The road was assigned to State Route 856 on July 1, 1976.

== Major intersections ==
The entire route is in Pershing County.

Location	mi	km	Destinations	Notes
Lovelock	0.00	0.00	I-80 BL west (Cornell Avenue) / SR 396 (Upper Valley Road) / 14th Street	West end of I-80 Business overlap
Lovelock			I-80 east / US 95 north – Winnemucca	East end of I-80 Business; I-80 exit 107; No access from I-80 eastbound or to I-80 westbound
	1.39	2.24	Reservoir Road / Airport Road	
1.000 mi = 1.609 km; 1.000 km = 0.621 mi: Concurrency terminus
