= List of highways numbered 397 =

The following highways are numbered 397:

== Canada ==
- Manitoba Provincial Road 397
- Saskatchewan Highway 397
- Quebec Route 397

== Ireland ==
- R397 road (Ireland)

== Japan ==
- Japan National Route 397

== South Africa ==
- R397 (South Africa)

== Spain ==
- Autovía A-397

== United States ==
- Arkansas Highway 397
- Louisiana Highway 397
- Montana Secondary Highway 397 (former)
- Nevada State Route 397
- New York:
  - New York State Route 397
  - County Route 397 (Erie County, New York)
- Puerto Rico Highway 397
- Tennessee State Route 397
- Virginia State Route 397
- Washington State Route 397

Preceded by 396	Lists of highways 397	Succeeded by 398
