= Nevada State Route 397 =

Highway in Nevada

State Route 397
- Westergard Road, Meridian Road
- SR 397 highlighted in red

Route information
- Maintained by NDOT
- Length: 11.840 mi (19.055 km)
- Existed: 1976–present
- History: Created as SR 59 by 1937

Major junctions
- South end: SR 860 near Derby Field
- North end: SR 398 in Lovelock

Location
- Country: United States
- State: Nevada
- Counties: Pershing

Highway system
- Nevada State Highway System; Interstate; US; State; Pre‑1976; Scenic
← SR 396	→ SR 398

State Route 397 (SR 397) is a state highway in the U.S. state of Nevada. It runs from State Route 860 near Derby Field east on Westergard Road and north on Meridian Road into Lovelock. After passing under Interstate 80/U.S. Route 95, it turns northeast on Amherst Avenue and ends at State Route 398, two blocks southeast of State Route 396 (old U.S. Route 40).

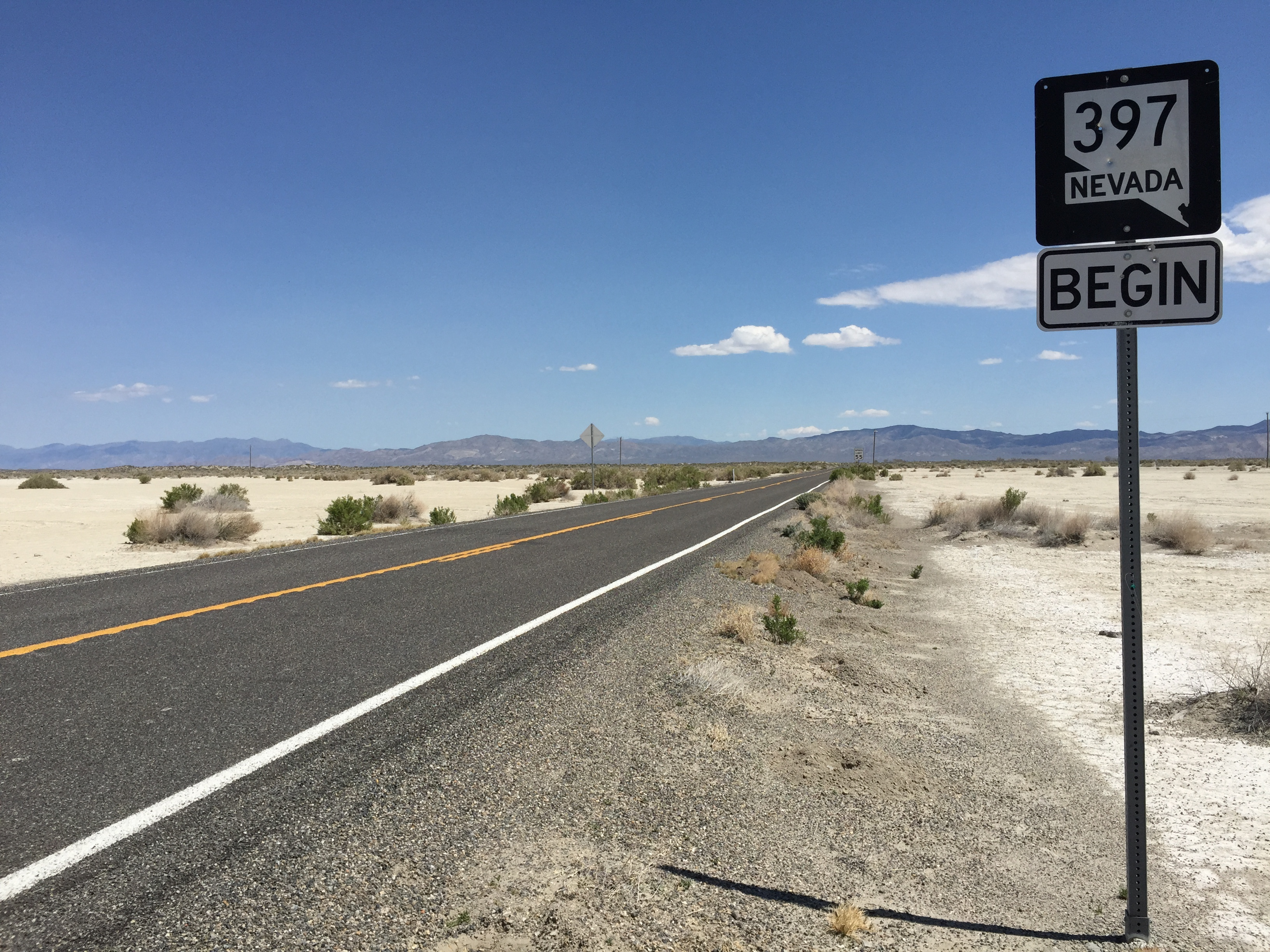
View from the south end of SR 397 looking northbound

== History ==
Until the 1976 renumbering, most of SR 397 was State Route 59, defined by 1937. At one point, SR 397 only used Westergard Road east of Westfall Road, turning north there to return to I-80/US 95 at Perth. Later, possibly when SR 860 was added, Westfall Road was dropped and SR 397 was extended west to meet SR 860.

== Major intersections ==
The entire route is in Pershing County.

Location	mi	km	Destinations	Notes
			SR 860 (Derby Field Road)	Southern terminus
Lovelock			SR 398 (Main Street)	Northern terminus
1.000 mi = 1.609 km; 1.000 km = 0.621 mi
