= Ejnar Hansen (painter) =

American painter

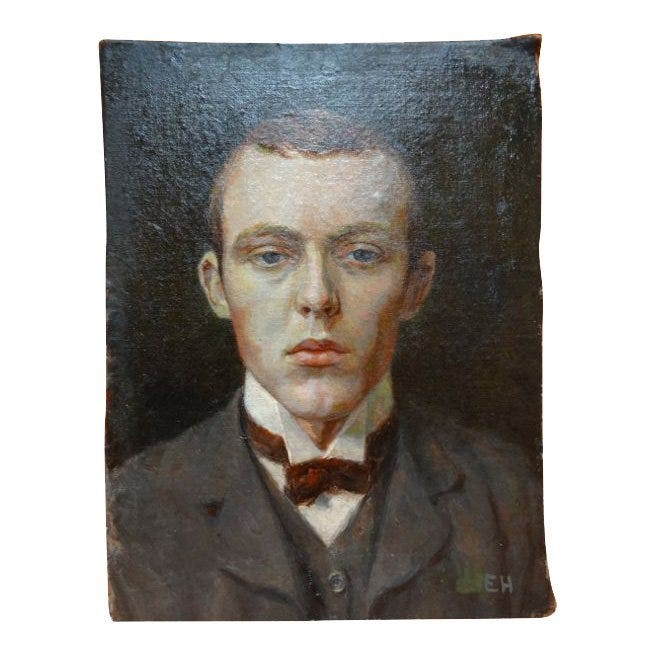
- Early self-portrait
- Born: 1884; Copenhagen, Denmark
- Died: September 26, 1965 (aged 80–81); Pasadena, California, U.S.
- Occupations: Painter, Educator
- Known for: Paintings and prints
- Spouse: Helga Hansen
- Children: 1 son, 1 daughter

Ejnar Hansen (1884 – September 26, 1965) was a Danish-born American portrait painter and art educator. His work is in the permanent collections of the Los Angeles County Museum of Art and the Laguna Art Museum and is also held at the San Diego Museum of Art, Carnegie Art Museum (Oxnard, CA) and Brigham Young University Museum of Art.

== Life and career ==
Hansen came from a farming background in Denmark and originally trained at a technical school to become a painting contractor, later taking evening classes at the Royal Danish Academy of Fine Arts in Copenhagen. An admirer of Edvard Munch, he became part of the De Tretten (The Thirteen) group, modernist painters who rebelled against the academic style and expressed great interest in Expressionism and Cubism. He emigrated to the U.S. in 1914 and, before settling in Pasadena, California a decade later, he lived in Michigan, Wheaton IL, Wisconsin and Minnesota. It was during this wandering period that his son, the future artist Jorgen Hansen (1922-2008), was born. Once he had arrived in California, Hansen supported himself by teaching at Chouinard Art Institute, the Otis Art Institute, Pomona College, John Muir College and the Art Center School in Pasadena.

Meanwhile, his paintings in oil and watercolor continued to be exhibited, winning both national and regional competitions, as a result of which official commissions began to come Hansen's way. Examples of these include the mural for the newly completed post office building in Lovelock, Nevada, commissioned in 1939 by the Federal Works Agency as part of the New Deal program. For this, Hansen chose "The Uncovering of the Comstock Lode" as a suitable local subject, treating it in the style of simplified realism favored by the Agency. Another was the 1944 portrait of Airforce General James H. Doolittle, possibly used to illustrate a magazine feature.

Among Hansen's artistic friends was Maynard Dixon, whom he accompanied on many painting trips. Others included Ben Berlin (1887-1939) and Danish-born Frode Dann (1892-1984). He was also close to the older intellectual Sadakichi Hartmann, of whom Hansen was the frequent portraitist during the latter part of his life.

Hansen belonged to the Los Angeles Art Association and Pasadena Society of Artists. Exhibitions of his work outside California have included at the Art Institute of Chicago, the 1939 New York World's Fair and at Washington's Corcoran Gallery of Art, as well as at the Golden Gate Exposition in San Francisco. Later there were two major retrospective exhibitions of Hansen's work. The first, held at Pasadena Art Museum in 1956, celebrated a half century of creativity. Following his death, there was a centenary retrospective in 1984 at the James M. Hansen gallery in Santa Barbara.

== Painting ==
The subject matter of Hansen's art included landscapes, still-lives, portraits and figure paintings. Although his palette brightened with the move to California, a dark Expressionist energy persisted at all periods in his work. It is to be found in the sombre "The Cabin" of 1916, soon after his arrival in the U.S.; in the later still life titled "Spring Harvest"; and in the expressive figure study titled "The Metaphysician", of which there also exists a photo of a more conventional preliminary study dated 1941.

Given Hansen's origin, it is not surprising that his plein air work includes detailed studies of farmhouses, barns and shacks, but his portraits are also outstanding. Bram Dijkstra, discussing this aspect of Hansen's work in his 1996 article on Early Modernism in Southern California, describes him as painting "startling character studies of tormented or eccentric men and world-weary young women on the edge of disintegration. These paintings, which capture much of the neurotic tension of modern life, are among the finest examples of twentieth-century portraiture."

The Ejnar Hansen papers are now held in the Smithsonian Archives of American Art.
