= Marzen House =

Historic house in Nevada, United States

- U.S. National Register of Historic Places
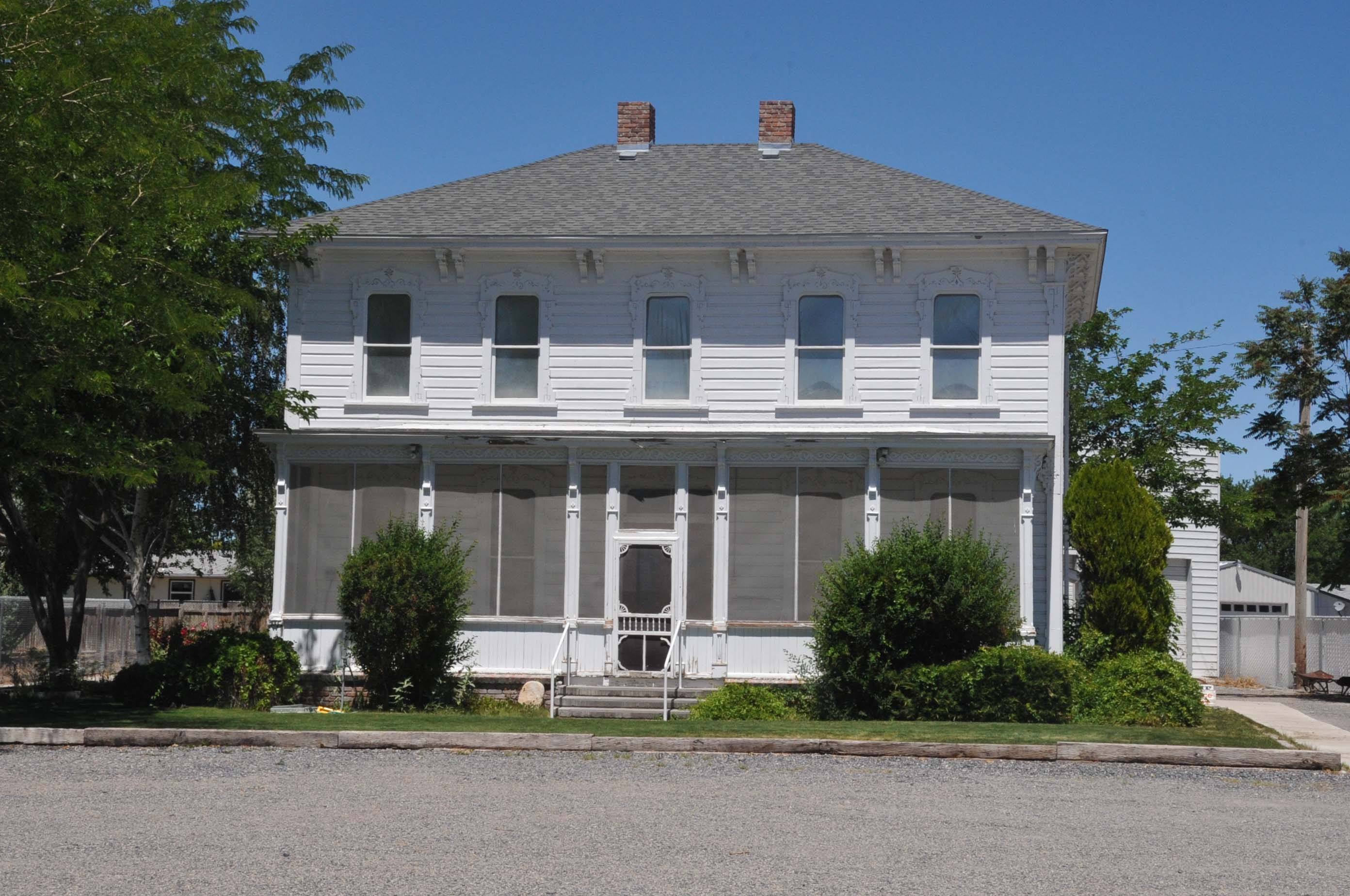

- Location within Nevada Location within the United States
- Nearest city: Lovelock, Nevada
- Coordinates: 40°10′15″N 118°28′53″W
- Area: less than one acre
- Built: 1875
- Architectural style: Italianate
- NRHP reference No.: 81000384
- Added to NRHP: August 27, 1981

The Marzen House, near Lovelock, Nevada, which has also been known as Big Meadow Ranch House, is an Italianate style house that was built in 1875. It was listed on the National Register of Historic Places in 1981.

It is significant as being the most prominent historic ranch house in the Lovelock Valley, and for association with Colonel Joseph Marzen, as well as for its Italianate architecture.

== Description ==
Marzen House was built as a residence in 1875 by Colonel Joseph Marzen (1828-1916). The surrounding territory was developed into a vast and affluent ranch. The two-story house is designed with ornate jigsaw cutout window moldings and corner-boards. This symmetrical building is capped with a hipped roof which is low pitched.

The exterior, which is formally balanced, is sided in shiplap initially painted white. It has stilted segmental arch moldings which are surrounded by double-hung wooden windows. The leading doorway has ornate Victorian double doors and a transom above decorated with frosted glass surrounded by cutout molding.

== History and context ==
Marzen House, or the Big Meadows Ranch House was built in the 1800s. The description notifies that Colonel Joseph Marzen was a very thriving rancher in Nevada.

Coming to Nevada in 1863, Mr. Marzen started the trade of butcher in Virginia City. He first visited the Lovelock Valley in 1873, he brought in thousands of cattle during his visit. After around 2 years, he returned to the Lovelock Valley to build a house there and so he bought land in the area of Big Meadows. Using the close by Humboldt River, Mr. Marzen irrigated the land for wheat cultivation. He constructed the most striking house in the Lovelock Valley as his residence concurrently. The ownership of the ranch house has been changed many times after Colonel Joseph Marzen. The later possessors were well-known people like Louis Aloys Friedman, the Baldwin estate, and Raymond Lewis Knisley.

After the Big Meadows Ranch House was listed on the National Register of Historic Places, the empty house was shifted to the edge of the Big Meadow Ranch from its first position so that it could be used as a museum. Currently, it is accessible to the public and it is still in its rural setting at Lovelock Valley. The initial landscape has been revived with a lawn outlined by a number of trees.
