= Nevada State Route 399 =

Highway in Nevada, US

State Route 399
- Eagle Picher Mine Road, Pitt Road
- SR 399 highlighted in red

Route information
- Maintained by NDOT
- Length: 18.184 mi (29.264 km)
- Existed: 1976–present

Major junctions
- West end: Eagle Picher Mine
- East end: SR 398 north of Lovelock

Location
- Country: United States
- State: Nevada
- Counties: Pershing

Highway system
- Nevada State Highway System; Interstate; US; State; Pre‑1976; Scenic
← SR 398	→ SR 400

State Route 399 (SR 399) is an 18.18-mile (29.26 km) state highway in Pershing County, Nevada. It connects Eagle-Picher Mine to Lovelock, the nearest town.

== Route description ==
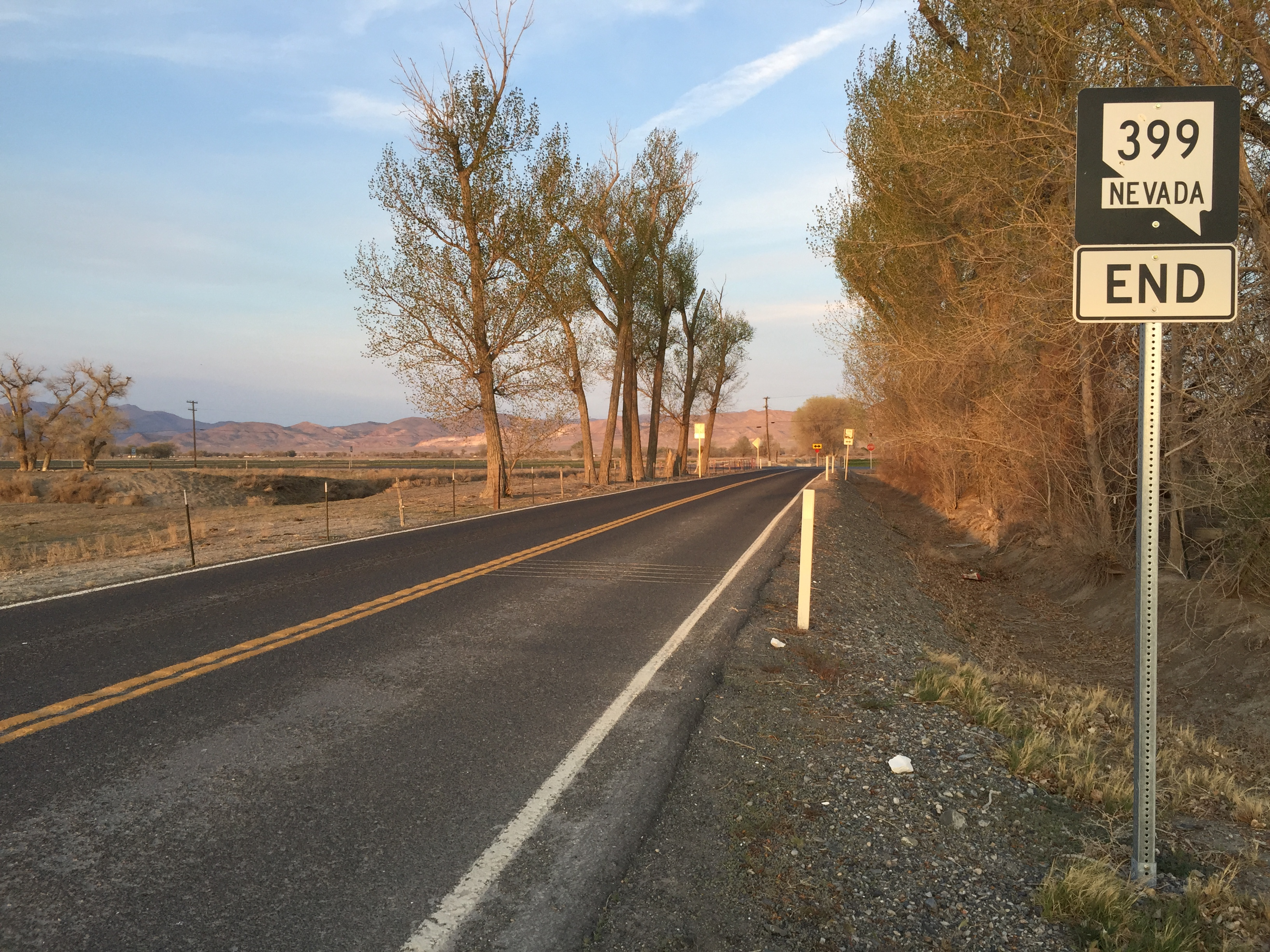
The east end of SR 399

SR 399's west terminus is at the entrance to Eagle-Picher Mine, which mines diatomite. SR 399 continues northeast and intersects Seven Troughs Road. SR 399 goes southwest on Seven Troughs Road until it meets SR 854, where it becomes Pitt Road. Pitt Road continues east until it meets North Meridian Road/SR 398 north of Lovelock.

== History ==
SR 399 was established on July 1, 1976.

== Major intersections ==
The entire route is in Pershing County.

Location	mi	km	Destinations	Notes
	0	0.0	Eagle-Picher Mine	Western terminus
			SR 854 (Lone Mountain Road)	
			SR 398 (North Meridian Road) – Lovelock	Eastern terminus
1.000 mi = 1.609 km; 1.000 km = 0.621 mi
