= Arkansas Highway 399 =

State highway in Arkansas, United States

Highway 399
- Current route in red, former route in blue

Route information
- Maintained by ArDOT
- Length: 0.55 mi (890 m)

Major junctions
- South end: US 70B in DeQueen
- North end: US 70 in DeQueen

Location
- Country: United States
- State: Arkansas

Highway system
- Arkansas Highway System; Interstate; US; State; Business; Spurs; Suffixed; Scenic; Heritage
← AR 398	→ AR 400

Arkansas Highway 399 (AR 399, Hwy. 399) is a short north–south highway in southwestern Arkansas. Its southern terminus is at an intersection with U.S. Route 70 Business (US 70 Bus.) in DeQueen. Its northern terminus is at US 70 west of DeQueen.

== History ==
There was once a second roadway with the Highway 399 designation, located west of Foreman in Little River County. It was the old location of Highway 32 through Arkinda to the Oklahoma border. This road is now County Road 63.

== Major intersections ==
The entire route is in DeQueen, Sevier County.

mi	km	Destinations	Notes
0.00	0.00	US 70B	
0.55	0.89	US 70	
1.000 mi = 1.609 km; 1.000 km = 0.621 mi
