= Nevada State Route 396 =

Highway in Nevada

State Route 396
- Cornell Avenue, Upper Valley Road
- SR 396 highlighted in red

Route information
- Maintained by NDOT
- Length: 7.701 mi (12.394 km)
- Existed: 1976–present

Major junctions
- South end: I-80 in Lovelock
- North end: I-80 north of Lovelock

Location
- Country: United States
- State: Nevada

Highway system
- Nevada State Highway System; Interstate; US; State; Pre‑1976; Scenic
← US 395	→ SR 397

State Route 396 (SR 396) is a state highway in Pershing County, Nevada serving the city of Lovelock. The highway forms a portion of Interstate 80 Business within the city of Lovelock, and previously carried the alignment of former U.S. Route 40 and U.S. Route 95.

== Route description ==
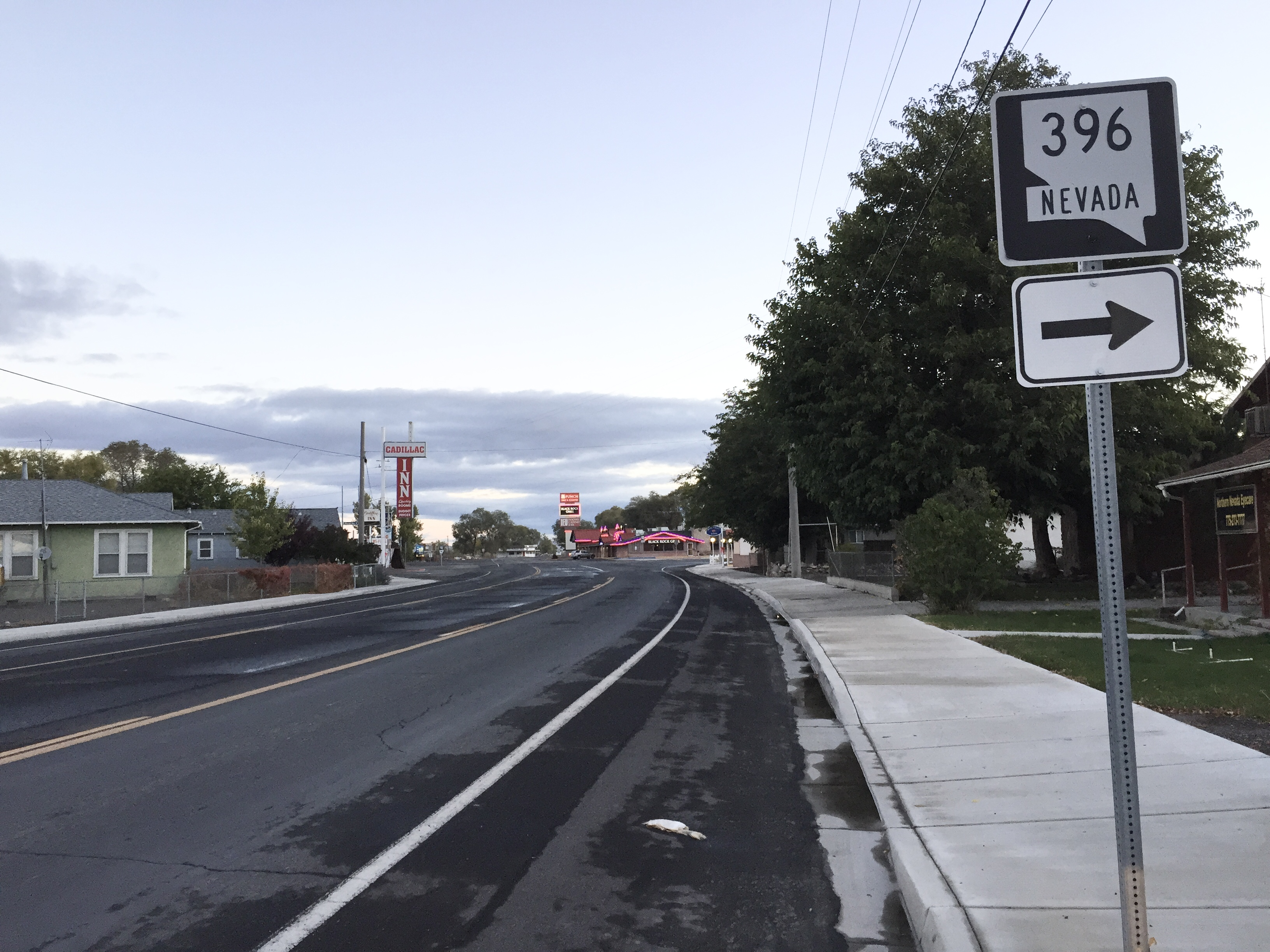
View along SR 396 near the north edge of Lovelock looking northbound

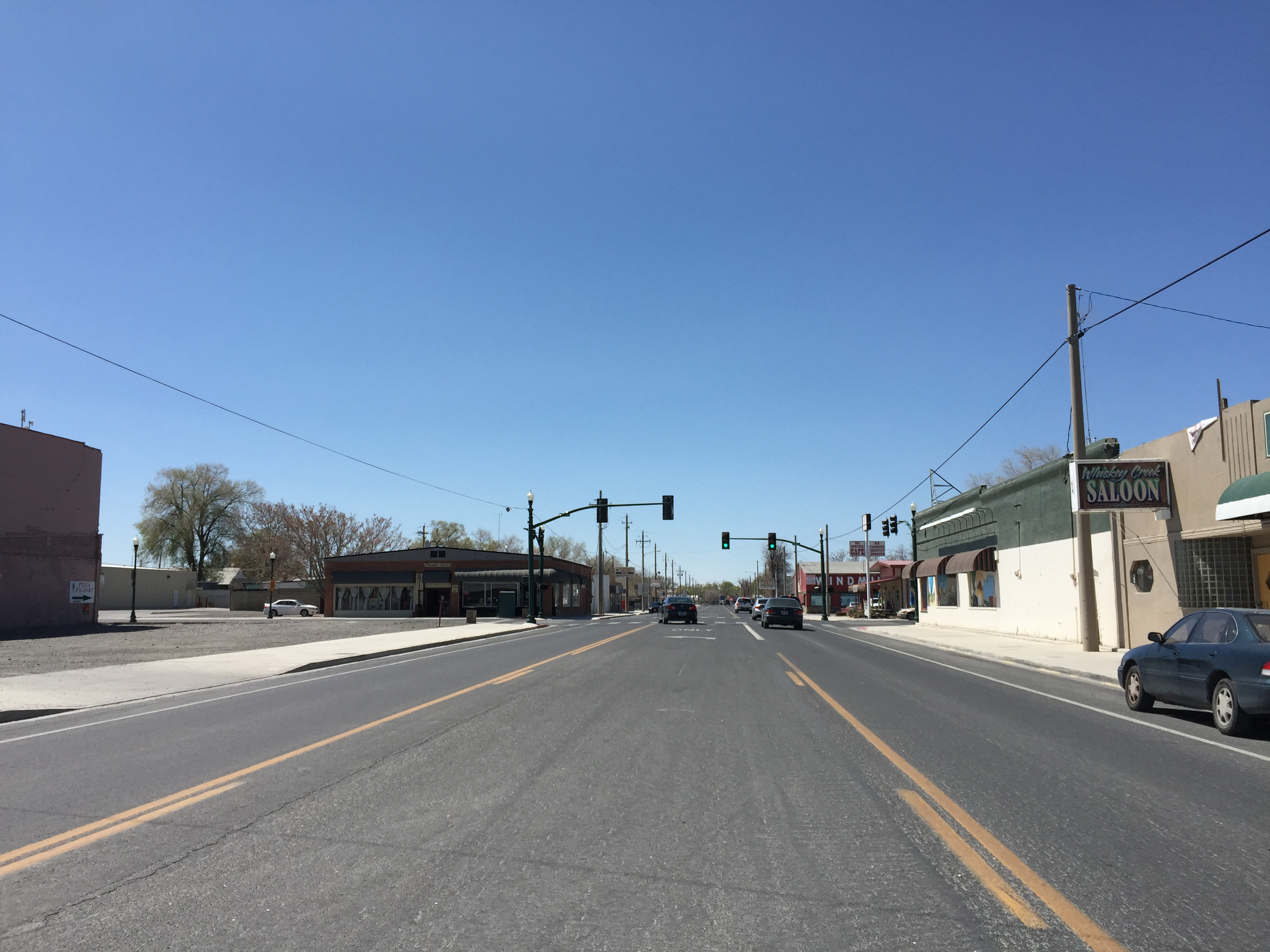
SR 396 in downtown Lovelock

SR 396 begins at the West Lovelock interchange with Interstate 80 and U.S. Route 95. The route follows Cornell Avenue north into the center of the town. The highway crosses Main Street (SR 398) and continues along Cornell Avenue to its end at a five-point intersection with 14th Street, Airport Road (SR 856) and Upper Valley Road near the Lovelock city limits. Here, State Route 396 turns to follow Upper Valley Road.

As the route heads northeast out of Lovelock, the surroundings become more rural in nature with open farmland on both sides of the highway. The highway also parallels the Union Pacific railroad tracks for some distance. Eventually, SR 396 turns east to intersect I-80 again at the Coal Canyon interchange, where the route terminates.

The Cornell Avenue portion of State Route 396 also carries a portion of Lovelock's Interstate 80 Business Loop. The business route diverges from SR 396 at 14th Street, following Airport Road back to I-80.

== History ==
SR 396 originated as part of State Route 1, which later became US 40.

SR 396 was originally part of State Route 1 (SR 1). That route, designated with the passage of Nevada's first highway law in 1917, created a highway route across northern Nevada from California to Utah which passed through Lovelock. With the adoption of the U.S. Highway System in 1926, US 40 was eventually added concurrently with SR 1.

With the advent of the Interstate Highway system, Interstate 80 (I-80) gradually replaced US 40 across northern Nevada and was removed from Lovelock by 1976. Also around this time, the Nevada Department of Transportation was beginning to renumber its highways, eliminating the State Route 1 designation and redesignating the Lovelock portion on Cornell Avenue and Upper Valley Road as State Route 396. Even though the cross-state designations of US 40 and SR 1 had been eliminated by the mid-1970s, construction of the Interstate 80 freeway in Lovelock was not started until 1981, so through traffic continued to use SR 396 in the city.

== Major intersections ==
The entire route is in Pershing County.

Location	mi	km	Destinations	Notes
Lovelock	0.00	0.00	I-80 west / US 95 south – Fernley	Southern terminus; southern end of I-80 Bus. concurrency
Lovelock			SR 398 (Main Street)	
Lovelock			I-80 BL east (Airport Road/SR 856)	Northern end of I-80 Bus. concurrency
			SR 398 (Fairview Road)	
	7.70	12.39	I-80 / US 95 – Winnemucca, Fernley	Northern terminus
1.000 mi = 1.609 km; 1.000 km = 0.621 mi: Concurrency terminus
