= Arkansas Highway 400 =

Highway in Arkansas

Highway 400

Route information
- Maintained by ArDOT
- Length: 2.05 mi (3.30 km)

Major junctions
- West end: US 71 near Chester
- East end: Lake Fort Smith State Park

Location
- Country: United States
- State: Arkansas
- Counties: Crawford

Highway system
- Arkansas Highway System; Interstate; US; State; Business; Spurs; Suffixed; Scenic; Heritage
← AR 399	→ US 412

Arkansas Highway 400 (AR 400), also known as Shepherd Springs Road, is a short state highway in Crawford County. At just over 2 miles (3.2 km), it serves as the entrance road for Lake Fort Smith State Park from U.S. Route 71 (US 71).

== Route description ==
Highway 400 begins at US 71 northeast of Chester. The route passes through the rugged terrain of the Ozark National Forest. The highway descends down a steep hill, this section of road features a hairpin turn. It continues to descend the hill until it reaches the entrance to Lake Fort Smith State Park, where the designation ends.

== Major intersections ==
The entire route is in Crawford County.

Location	mi	km	Destinations	Notes
	0.00	0.00	US 71 – Mountainburg, Winslow	
	2.05	3.30	Lake Fort Smith State Park entrance	
1.000 mi = 1.609 km; 1.000 km = 0.621 mi
