= Nevada State Route 398 =

Highway in Nevada

State Route 398
- Main Street, Central Avenue, North Meridian Road, Fairview Road
- SR 398 highlighted in red

Route information
- Maintained by NDOT
- Length: 4.767 mi (7.672 km)
- Existed: 1976–present

Major junctions
- South end: I-80 / US 95 in Lovelock
- North end: SR 396 near Lovelock

Location
- Country: United States
- State: Nevada

Highway system
- Nevada State Highway System; Interstate; US; State; Pre‑1976; Scenic
← SR 397	→ SR 399

State Route 398 (SR 398) is a state highway in Pershing County, Nevada serving the city of Lovelock. Part of the highway is former State Route 66.

== Route description ==
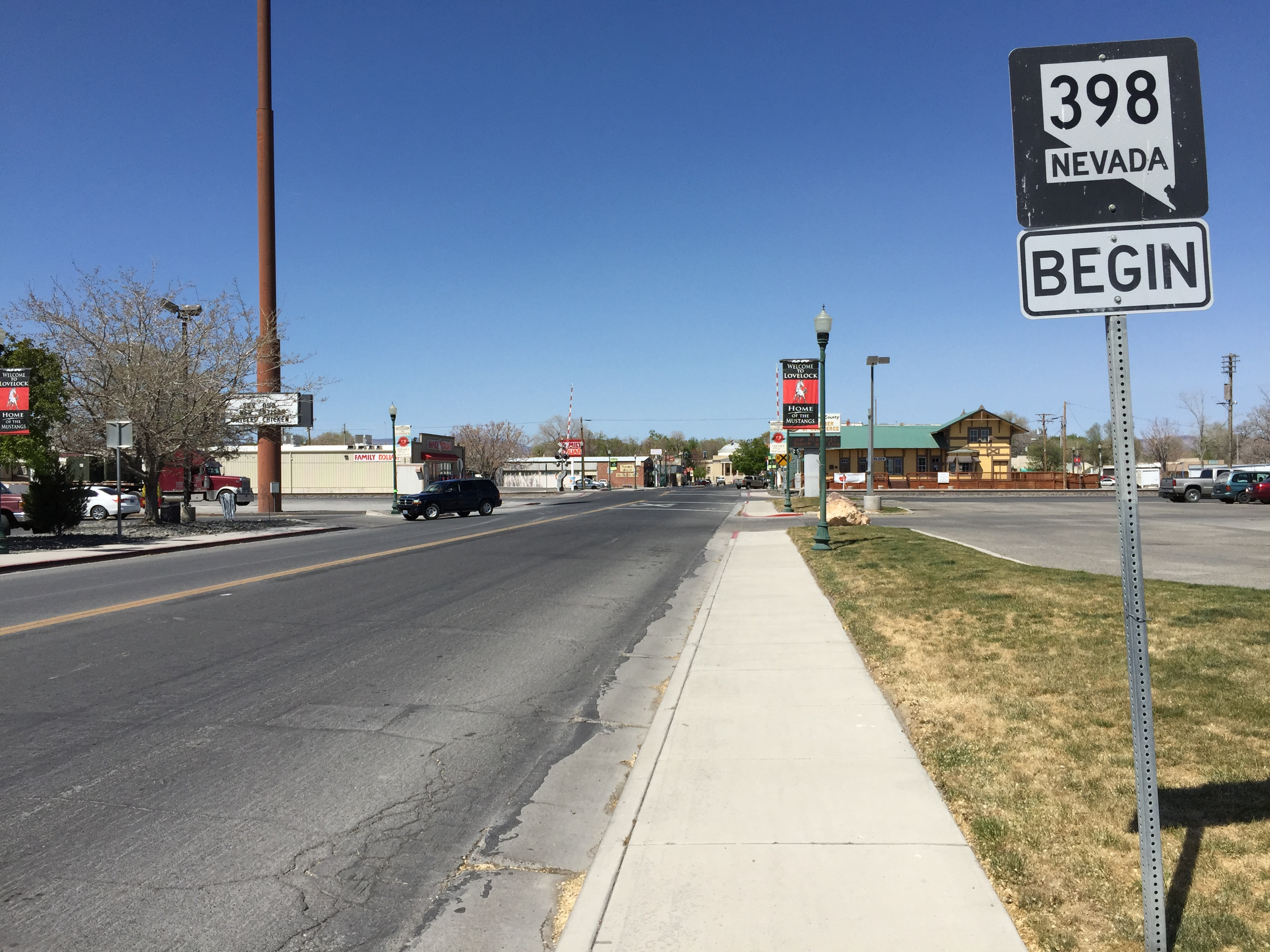
SR 398 on Main Street in Lovelock

State Route 398 begins at interchange 106 with Interstate 80 (and concurrent U.S. Route 95) near the center of Lovelock. From here, the highway heads northwest under the freeway on Main Street towards the town. After crossing the Union Pacific Railroad tracks, the route intersects Cornell Avenue (I-80 Bus.) at the center of the city. Main Street at the intersection of Central Avenue at the steps to the Pershing County Courthouse; SR 398, however, follows Central Avenue through residential areas of the city.

Exiting the city limits of Lovelock north of 16th Street, SR 398 becomes North Meridian Road. As the two-lane highway continues northward, houses gradually disappear in favor of the farm tracts of Upper Valley. The highway intersects Fairview Road, which it follows eastward. State Route 398 comes to an end at an intersection with Upper Valley Road (SR 396) northeast of Lovelock.

== History ==
Part of SR 398 was originally State Route 66.

The north–south segment of present-day State Route 398 appears on maps as early as 1937 in the form of State Route 66. SR 66 ran from State Route 1/U.S. Route 40 (now SR 396) approximately 2.5 miles (4.0 km) to its terminus at Fairview Road. SR 66 appears to have remained unchanged until the 1976 renumbering of Nevada's state highways on July 1, 1976. At that time, the highway was renumbered as State Route 398. The Fairview Road segment was likely added to the route during that process.

== Major intersections ==
The entire route is in Pershing County.

Location	mi	km	Destinations	Notes
Lovelock	0.00	0.00	I-80 / US 95 – Winnemucca, Fernley	
Lovelock			SR 397 (Amherst Street)	
Lovelock			I-80 BL (Cornell Avenue/SR 396)	
			SR 399 (Pitt Road)	
	4.77	7.68	SR 396 (Upper Valley Road)	
1.000 mi = 1.609 km; 1.000 km = 0.621 mi
