= Derby Field =

Airport in Nevada

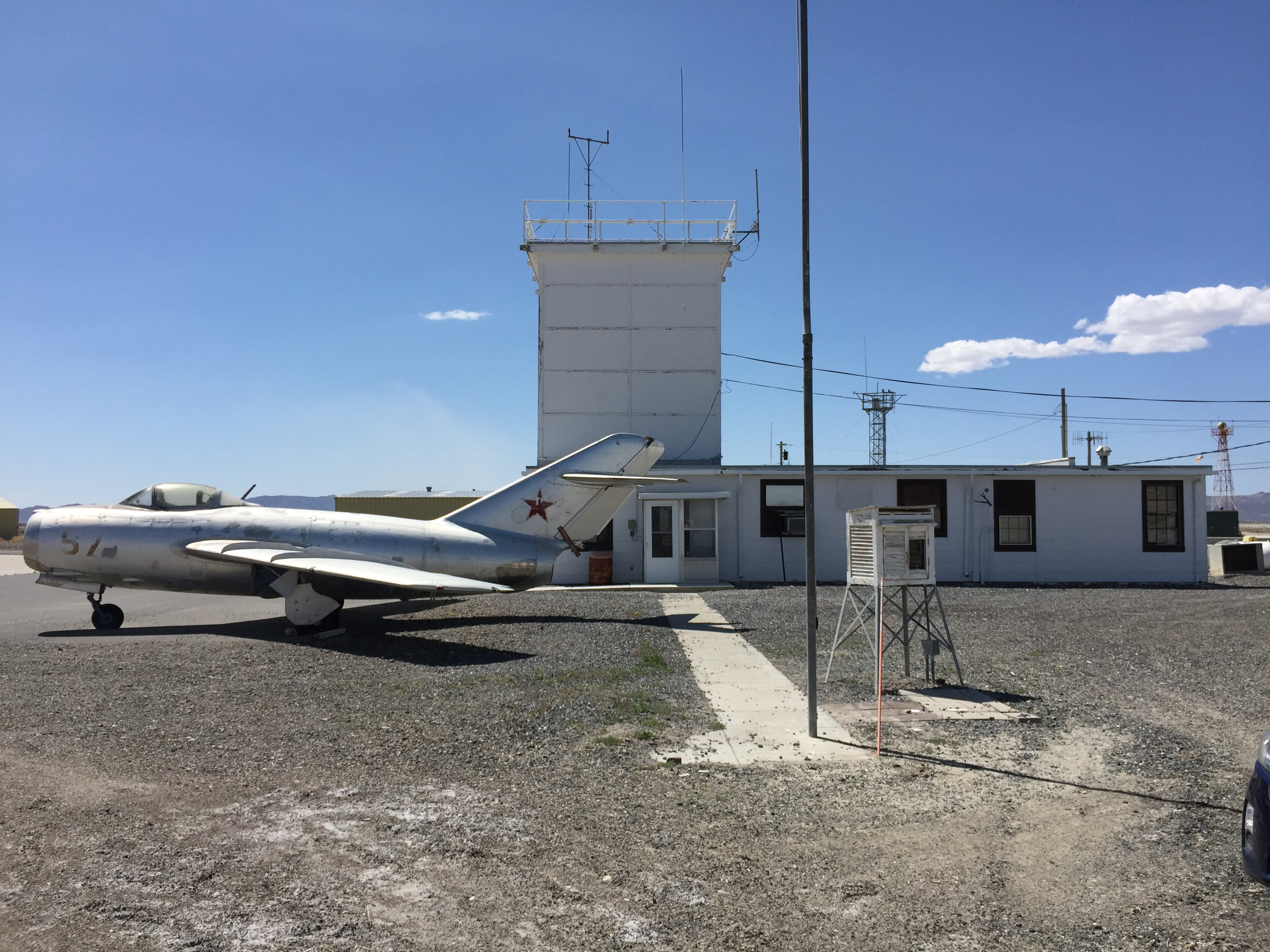
- IATA: LOL; ICAO: KLOL; FAA LID: LOL

Summary
- Airport type: Public
- Owner: Pershing County
- Serves: Lovelock, Nevada
- Elevation AMSL: 3,907 ft (1,191 m)
- Coordinates: 40°03′59″N 118°33′54″W

Map
- Location within Nevada

Runways
Direction	Length		Surface
Direction	ft	m	Surface
2/20	5,529	1,685	Asphalt
8/26	4,931	1,503	Asphalt

Statistics (2023)
- Aircraft operations (year ending 7/17/2023): 2,765
- Based aircraft: 2
- Source: Federal Aviation Administration

Derby Field (IATA: LOL, ICAO: KLOL, FAA LID: LOL) is a public airport nine miles southwest of Lovelock, in Pershing County, Nevada. The National Plan of Integrated Airport Systems for 2011–2015 categorized it as a general aviation facility.

== Facilities ==
Derby Field covers 550 acres (223 ha) at an elevation of 3,907 feet (1,191 m). It has two runways: 2/20 is 5,529 by 75 feet (1,685 x 23 m) and 8/26 is 4,931 by 75 feet (1,503 x 23 m).

In the year ending July 17, 2023, the airport had 2,765 aircraft operations, average 53 per week: 73% general aviation, and 27% military. Two aircraft were then based at the airport, both single-engine.

== In popular culture ==
Derby Field has had many references in popular culture, mostly due to its IATA code, LOL, being the same as the common internet acronym.

== See also ==
- List of airports in Nevada
