= Eagle-Picher =

American storage battery manufacturing company

EaglePicher Technologies
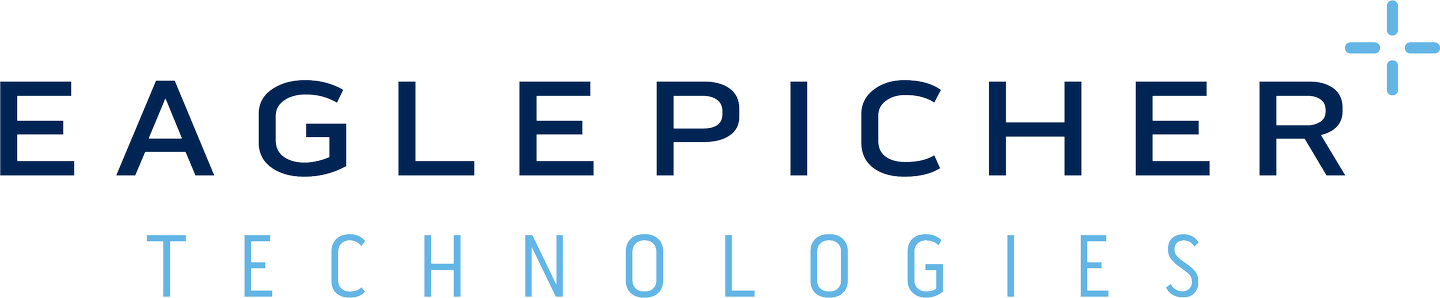
- Type: Private
- Founded: 1843
- Founder: Edgar and Stephen J. Conkling
- Headquarters: St. Louis, Missouri, United States
- Products: Thermal batteries; Primary batteries; Secondary batteries; Energetic devices; Implantable medical batteries; Medical battery packs; Custom battery management systems; Charging stations
- Website: eaglepicher.com

EaglePicher Technologies is a privately held American manufacturing company known for its battery technology, energetic devices, and battery management systems. The company started in 1843 as the White Lead Company in Cincinnati, Ohio. A merger with the Picher Lead Company of Joplin, Missouri occurred in 1906, becoming Eagle–Picher Lead, which evolved into Eagle–Picher Industries, Inc. and finally EaglePicher Technologies. With its merger with the lead mining company owned by Oliver Picher, it was the second largest producer of lead and zinc products in the world. The company has provided lithium-ion batteries to military aircraft and high altitude unmanned aerial vehicles. EaglePicher also developed the first human-implantable lithium-ion battery. The company has nine North American manufacturing and research and development sites and over 900 employees.

== History ==
In 1843, the Conkling brothers, Edgar and Stephen J. Conkling, established a white lead factory, in Cincinnati, Ohio to manufacture pigments for commercial paints. They called the partnership the E. & S. J. Conkling Company. In 1847, Edgar took a new partner, William Wood, and the partnership became Conkling Wood & Company. After the American Civil War the firm was incorporated with William Wood as the majority stockholder. In 1906, the Picher Lead Company of Missouri merged with the Eagle White Lead to form Eagle-Picher Lead.

Eagle-Picher, starting with Picher Lead Company, operated lead and zinc extraction facilities in the Tri-State mining district of southwest Missouri, southeast Kansas and northeast Oklahoma. Picher, Oklahoma was named for O. S. Picher, the original owner of Picher Lead Company, and large-scale mining started there in 1913. The area became the most productive lead-zinc mining field in the district, producing over $20 billion worth of ore between 1917 and 1947. More than fifty percent of the lead and zinc metals used during World War I were produced around Picher. Extraction ended by 1967, but left enormous waste piles around the town contaminated by lead, zinc and cadmium. In 1983 the area was designated as part of the Tar Creek Superfund site, local residents were relocated out of the area over time, and the municipality of Picher was officially dissolved in November, 2013.

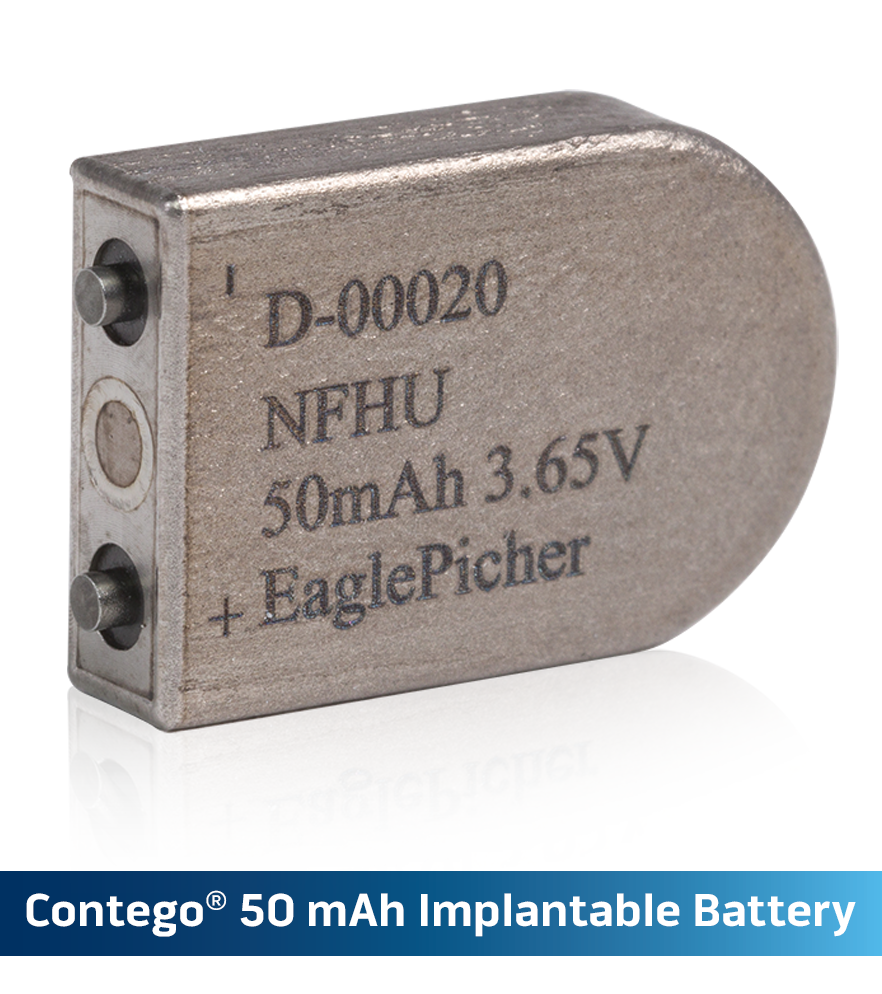
EaglePicher's medical grade implantable battery

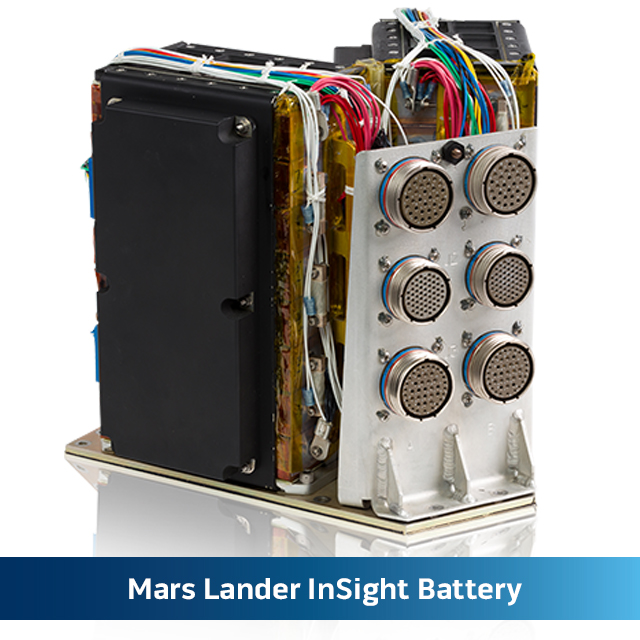
The battery that powered Mars Lander InSight that launched May 2018, designed and produced by EaglePicher Technologies

EaglePicher Technologies' history as a battery manufacturer dates back to 1922. The company became a battery supplier to the U.S. Government in the 1940s and was supplying silver-zinc batteries for missiles and rockets in the 1950s. During World War II, EaglePicher used diatomaceous earth and zinc to produce storage batteries for the US military. By 1947 they were among the first to adapt a purification system for germanium for commercial use in the transistor industry. The production of germanium, the first semiconducting material, was essential to the invention of the transistor and the development of solid state electronics. In 1953 EaglePicher sold its metallic products plant in Dallas to Murdock Lead Products.

In 1958, EaglePicher created batteries to power Explorer 1, the first U.S. satellite in space. When an oxygen tank explosion crippled the Apollo 13 spacecraft during its lunar mission in 1970, the safe return of three brave American astronauts depended heavily upon the EaglePicher batteries on board the spacecraft. EaglePicher's silver zinc batteries provided electrical power for the life support and guidance control systems after a fuel cell failed on the Apollo 13 landing, thus helping the astronauts return safely back to Earth.

EaglePicher started development work on thermal battery technology back in 1949. In 1974, the company was the first to begin work on large LiAl/FeS batteries for load leveling and electric vehicle application. By 1976, EaglePicher was the first in the world to adapt this rechargeable system to a primary LiAl/FeS2 thermal battery, improving thermal battery performance capability. In 1982, EaglePicher became the first thermal battery manufacturer to produce LiSi/FeS2 thermal batteries for the U.S. Department of Energy on a production basis.

In 1990, the Hubble Space telescope was launched with EaglePicher nickel hydrogen (NiH2) batteries. These batteries exceeded their projected 5-year life expectancy by 14 additional years, totaling 19 years battery life in space.

In January 1991 Eagle-Picher filed for bankruptcy protection having over $2.5 billion in asbestos-related claims asserted against it, as well as other environmental claims. Its reorganization was approved in November 1996 with the ownership of the company going to a trust for victims of asbestos and lead poisoning. In 1998 the trust sold the operating businesses to Granaria Holdings, a consortium of Dutch investors. In 2000, the company sold its last company (subsidiary) that operated in the Cincinnati area, Cincinnati Industrial Machinery, to Armor Metal Group. In 2002, corporate headquarters were relocated from Cincinnati to Phoenix, Arizona.

In April 2005, Eagle-Picher filed for bankruptcy protection a second time, having accumulated more than $500 million in new debt. It did not fully exit Chapter 11 reorganization until July 2009. During its reorganization, Eagle-Picher acquired new owners, restructured, moved its corporate headquarters in Michigan, and divested itself of some of its non-core businesses. In 2007, it sold its pharmaceutical division to Aptuit Inc. and its EP Boron subsidiary to Ceradyne. In 2008, Eagle-Picher sold Hillsdale Automotive (Metavation) to Cerion. In 2009 two principal new owners became Angelo, Gordon & Co., a New York investment firm, and Tennenbaum Capital Partners, a California investment firm. The owners constituted the EPMC Holdings Corp. In February 2010 Eagle-Picher Corp. sold EaglePicher Technologies, their battery division, and EaglePicher Medical Power to OM Group, Inc., a chemical and metals firm based in Cleveland, Ohio. As a result, Eagle-Picher Corp. subsequently changed its name to EP Management. In December EP Management then sold Wolverine Advanced Materials to Wynnchurch Capital. In 2011, EPMC Holdings Corp. sold both EP Management and EP Minerals (formerly Eagle-Picher Minerals) to Golden Gate Capital Corp. of San Francisco.

== Chairmen and presidents ==
- 2005 Stuart B. Gleichenhaus, chairman of the board, president and CEO (interim)
- 2006 Donald L. Runkle, chairman of the board
- 2006 David L. Treadwell, president (CEO)
- 2007 Randy Moore, president (CEO)
- 2016 Gordon Walker, president and chief executive officer
- 2019 Richard Hunter, chief executive officer
- 2023 Steve Westfall, President
