= Lovelock, Nevada =

Incorporated city in Nevada, United States

- Incorporated city
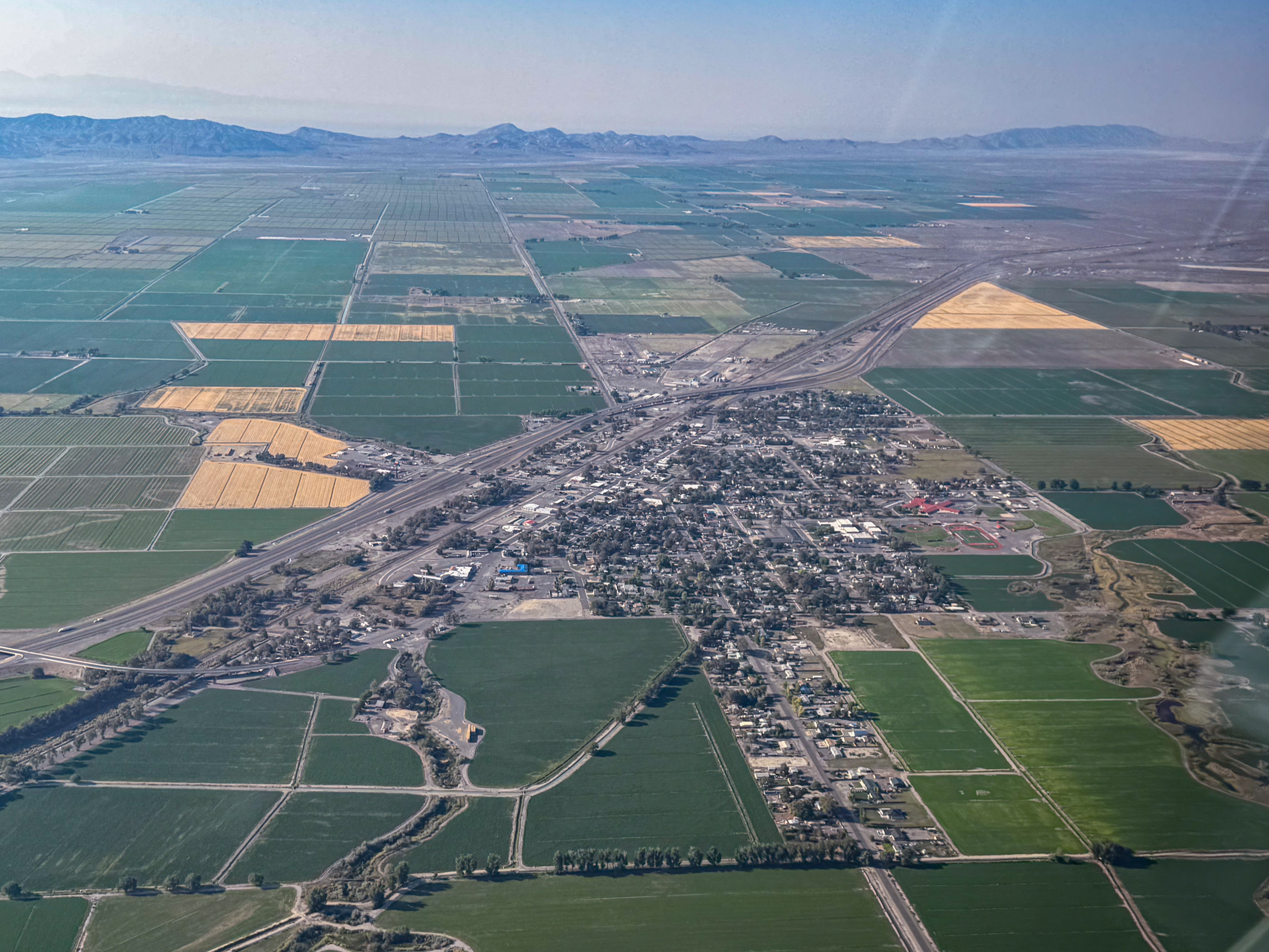
- Aerial photo of Lovelock

- Seal

- Location in Nevada Location in the United States
- Coordinates: 40°10′48″N 118°28′36″W
- Country: United States
- State: Nevada
- County: Pershing

Area
  - Total: 0.86 sq mi (2.23 km^{2})
  - Land: 0.86 sq mi (2.23 km^{2})
  - Water: 0 sq mi (0.00 km^{2})
- Elevation: 3,980 ft (1,213 m)

Population (2020)
  - Total: 1,805
  - Density: 2,096.2/sq mi (809.34/km^{2})
- Time zone: UTC-08:00 (PST)
  - Summer (DST): UTC-07:00 (PDT)
- ZIP code: 89419
- Area code: 775
- FIPS code GNIS ID: 32-43000; 0848577
- Website: www.cityoflovelock.com

Lovelock is the county seat of Pershing County, Nevada, United States, in which it is the only incorporated city. As of the 2020 census, Lovelock had a population of 1,805.

It is the namesake of a nearby medium-security men's prison and a Cold War–era gunnery range.

Formerly a stop for settlers on their way to California and later a train depot, the town's economy remains based on farming, mining and increasingly on tourism.

== History ==
The area in which the township of Lovelock would be established first came to prominence as a midpoint on the Humboldt Trail to California. According to an 1849 description of what were then called the Big Meadows, "This marsh for three miles is certainly the liveliest place that one could witness in a lifetime. There is some two hundred and fifty wagons here all the time. Trains going out and others coming in and taking their places is the constant order of the day. Cattle and mules by the hundreds are surrounding us, in grass to their knees, all discoursing sweet music with the grinding of their jaws.”

A few settlers stopped there to harvest the wild rye growing in the meadows and scythe the hay each fall, which they sold. Arriving there from California in 1866, the English settler George Lovelock (1824–1907) bought the squatters' right for 320 acres (129 ha) and received with it the oldest water rights on the Humboldt River.

Although born in Wales, Lovelock was from an English family of Wiltshire origin that is known to family historians as the Lyneham Line. His brother Daniel moved to Australia—and one of Daniel's sons to New Zealand—so that the relations of the man after whom the Nevada town was named are now widely scattered.

The town's foundation came about with the building of the Central Pacific Railroad through the area in August 1868. George Lovelock provided 85 acres (34 ha) for the site, so the depot was named 'Lovelock's' after him and appears as such on old maps.

Thereafter he put his mining expertise to work and discovered many valuable lodes in the surrounding area, which contributed to increased railway traffic. He also acted as the town's first postmaster and invested in hotels. In particular, he was the first proprietor of the Big Meadows Hotel on Main Street, adjacent to the train station. That was eventually adapted as the Greyhound Bus depot.

By 1900, the town of Lovelock had a school, churches and a business district along what was then called Railway Street—later renamed West Broadway. Also included among the businesses were three weekly newspapers: The Lovelock Tribune, which ran from May 1898 until February 1912; the short-lived Lovelock Standard (April–September 1900); and The Argus (May 1900-Jan 1905). In August 1908 the weekly Lovelock Review was founded, becoming Lovelock Review-Miner in January 1911 and remaining under that name to the present day.

Lovelock was incorporated as a city in 1917. In 1919 it was named the county seat when Pershing County was organized, carved out of the southern part of Humboldt County. Its famous round Court House was built at the end of Main Street, on the former site of a school that had been relocated.

While mining and agriculture were the base of the economy, the community thrived on the state specialty of gambling. It had many casinos and three legalized brothels; all of the latter are now closed.

The town's centenary was celebrated in 1968 with a Frontier Days theme suggested by two of the founder's great-great granddaughters, Elaine Pommerening and Pat Rowe, who had recently moved back to Lovelock. This was part of the more recent emphasis on heritage tourism.

In 1983, old U.S. Route 40 through downtown was bypassed by Interstate 80, which pulled business from the center. In the early 1990s the rail depot closed. Since then, the city has promoted its heritage tourist attractions, emphasizing its historic buildings and organizing special events.

Several mining booms have taken place in the neighboring mountains. These included intensive activity in the Rochester and Seven Troughs areas at the start of the 20th century, and subsequent drilling with more advanced techniques later in Rochester. The Coeur Rochester mine began further open cast mining for silver and gold in 2011. Test drilling for gold continues at Relief Canyon, and diatomite is dug at the Colado Mine.

== Geography ==
Lovelock lies in the Humboldt River Basin, very near the terminus of the river. Some 20 miles (32 km) outside the town is the Lovelock Native Cave, a horseshoe-shaped cave of about 35 ft width (11 m) and 150 ft length (46 m) where Northern Paiute natives anciently deposited a number of duck decoys and other artifacts.

According to the United States Census Bureau, the city has a total area of 0.9 square miles (2.3 km^{2}), all of it land. It has four differently designed welcome signs with pioneer and Wild West themes placed on its approach roads. At the southern end of town is the 20-acre reservation of the Lovelock Paiute Tribe, which has recently profited from a change in state law to open a marijuana dispensary there.

=== Climate ===
According to the Köppen Climate Classification system, Lovelock has a cold desert climate, abbreviated "BWk" on climate maps. The hottest temperature recorded in Lovelock was 112 °F (44 °C) on July 5, 2007, while the coldest temperature recorded was −38 °F (−39 °C) on January 25, 1949.

Climate data for Lovelock, Nevada (Derby Field), 1991–2020 normals, extremes 1948–present
| Month | Jan | Feb | Mar | Apr | May | Jun | Jul | Aug | Sep | Oct | Nov | Dec | Year |
|---|---|---|---|---|---|---|---|---|---|---|---|---|---|
| Record high °F (°C) | 68 (20) | 75 (24) | 83 (28) | 93 (34) | 102 (39) | 107 (42) | 110 (43) | 107 (42) | 106 (41) | 97 (36) | 80 (27) | 72 (22) | 110 (43) |
| Mean maximum °F (°C) | 57.9 (14.4) | 65.1 (18.4) | 74.7 (23.7) | 83.2 (28.4) | 92.3 (33.5) | 100.3 (37.9) | 105.0 (40.6) | 102.5 (39.2) | 96.9 (36.1) | 85.2 (29.6) | 70.1 (21.2) | 60.1 (15.6) | 105.5 (40.8) |
| Mean daily maximum °F (°C) | 45.2 (7.3) | 52.0 (11.1) | 61.1 (16.2) | 67.5 (19.7) | 76.7 (24.8) | 87.3 (30.7) | 96.1 (35.6) | 93.8 (34.3) | 84.9 (29.4) | 70.7 (21.5) | 55.3 (12.9) | 44.4 (6.9) | 69.6 (20.9) |
| Daily mean °F (°C) | 32.6 (0.3) | 38.1 (3.4) | 44.9 (7.2) | 50.5 (10.3) | 59.4 (15.2) | 68.1 (20.1) | 75.9 (24.4) | 73.3 (22.9) | 64.8 (18.2) | 52.5 (11.4) | 39.9 (4.4) | 31.7 (−0.2) | 52.6 (11.5) |
| Mean daily minimum °F (°C) | 20.0 (−6.7) | 24.2 (−4.3) | 28.6 (−1.9) | 33.4 (0.8) | 42.1 (5.6) | 48.9 (9.4) | 55.7 (13.2) | 52.7 (11.5) | 44.8 (7.1) | 34.2 (1.2) | 24.5 (−4.2) | 18.9 (−7.3) | 35.7 (2.0) |
| Mean minimum °F (°C) | 3.1 (−16.1) | 9.4 (−12.6) | 13.7 (−10.2) | 19.1 (−7.2) | 28.2 (−2.1) | 36.9 (2.7) | 45.6 (7.6) | 40.9 (4.9) | 30.8 (−0.7) | 18.2 (−7.7) | 8.5 (−13.1) | 1.8 (−16.8) | −2.8 (−19.3) |
| Record low °F (°C) | −38 (−39) | −25 (−32) | −2 (−19) | 8 (−13) | 17 (−8) | 26 (−3) | 37 (3) | 30 (−1) | 20 (−7) | 5 (−15) | −3 (−19) | −28 (−33) | −38 (−39) |
| Average precipitation inches (mm) | 0.76 (19) | 0.55 (14) | 0.52 (13) | 00.62 (16) | 0.86 (22) | 0.55 (14) | 0.16 (4.1) | 0.15 (3.8) | 0.29 (7.4) | 0.51 (13) | 0.50 (13) | 0.64 (16) | 6.11 (155.3) |
| Average snowfall inches (cm) | 3.7 (9.4) | 1.5 (3.8) | 1.0 (2.5) | 0.6 (1.5) | 0.2 (0.51) | 0.0 (0.0) | 0.0 (0.0) | 0.0 (0.0) | 0.0 (0.0) | 0.1 (0.25) | 0.7 (1.8) | 3.6 (9.1) | 11.4 (28.86) |
| Average precipitation days (≥ 0.01 in) | 6.1 | 4.8 | 4.2 | 4.4 | 4.8 | 3.2 | 1.8 | 1.5 | 2.0 | 3.0 | 3.6 | 5.1 | 44.5 |
| Average snowy days (≥ 0.1 in) | 2.6 | 0.9 | 0.8 | 0.2 | 0.0 | 0.0 | 0.0 | 0.0 | 0.0 | 0.0 | 0.7 | 2.3 | 7.5 |
Source 1: NOAA
Source 2: National Weather Service

== Demographics ==
Historical population
| Census | Pop. | Note | %± |
|---|---|---|---|
| 1910 | 1,104 | | — |
| 1920 | 1,263 | | 14.4% |
| 1930 | 1,294 | | 2.5% |
| 1940 | 1,604 | | 24.0% |
| 1950 | 1,948 | | 21.4% |
| 1960 | 1,571 | | −19.4% |
| 1970 | 1,680 | | 6.9% |
| 1980 | 2,069 | | 23.2% |
| 1990 | 2,003 | | −3.2% |
| 2000 | 1,894 | | −5.4% |
| 2010 | 2,236 | | 18.1% |
| 2020 | 1,805 | | −19.3% |
U.S. Decennial Census

As of the census of 2000, there were 2,003 people, 778 households, and 493 families residing in the city. The population density was 2,311.6 inhabitants per square mile (892.5/km^{2}). There were 951 housing units at an average density of 1,097.5 per square mile (423.7/km^{2}). The racial makeup of the city was 76.49% White, 0.80% African American, 7.14% Native American, 0.70% Asian, 0.20% Pacific Islander, 10.03% from other races, and 4.64% from two or more races. Hispanic or Latino of any race were 24.21% of the population.

There were 778 households, out of which 33.5% had children under the age of 18 living with them, 47.8% were married couples living together, 9.3% had a female householder with no husband present, and 36.6% were non-families. 31.5% of all households were made up of individuals, and 12.5% had someone living alone who was 65 years of age or older. The average household size was 2.52 and the average family size was 3.22.

In the city, the population was spread out, with 31.2% under the age of 18, 7.5% from 18 to 24, 27.2% from 25 to 44, 20.9% from 45 to 64, and 13.3% who were 65 years of age or older. The median age was 34 years. For every 100 females, there were 107.8 males. For every 100 females age 18 and over, there were 105.2 males.

The median income for a household in the city was $39,563, and the median income for a family was $44,885. Males had a median income of $38,658 versus $20,371 for females. The per capita income for the city was $17,233. About 9.6% of families and 19.2% of the population were below the poverty line, including 18.9% of those under age 18 and 19.3% of those age 65 or over. The majority rely on agriculture and mining for their income.

== Economy ==
=== Tourism ===
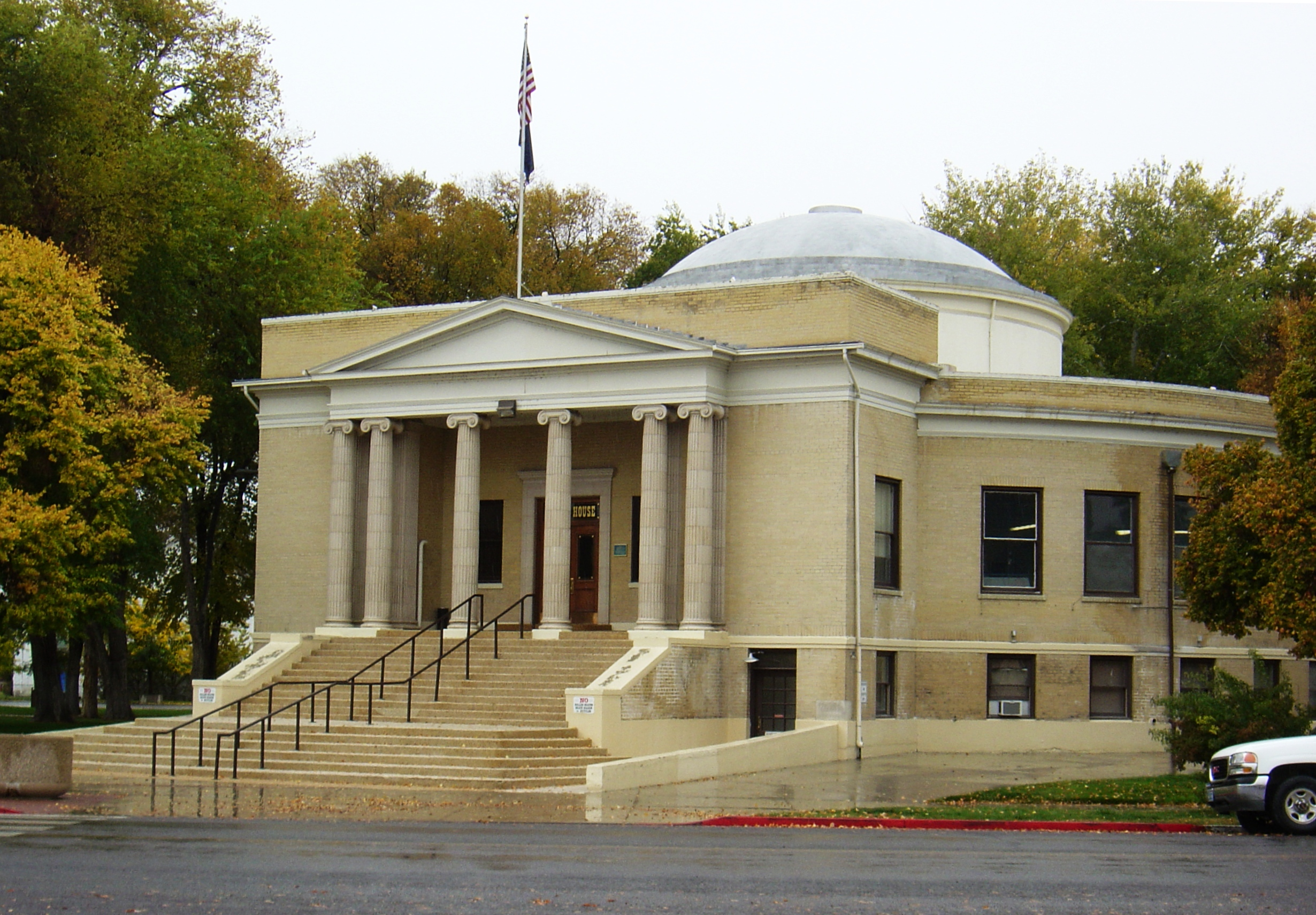
Pershing County Court House in Lovelock

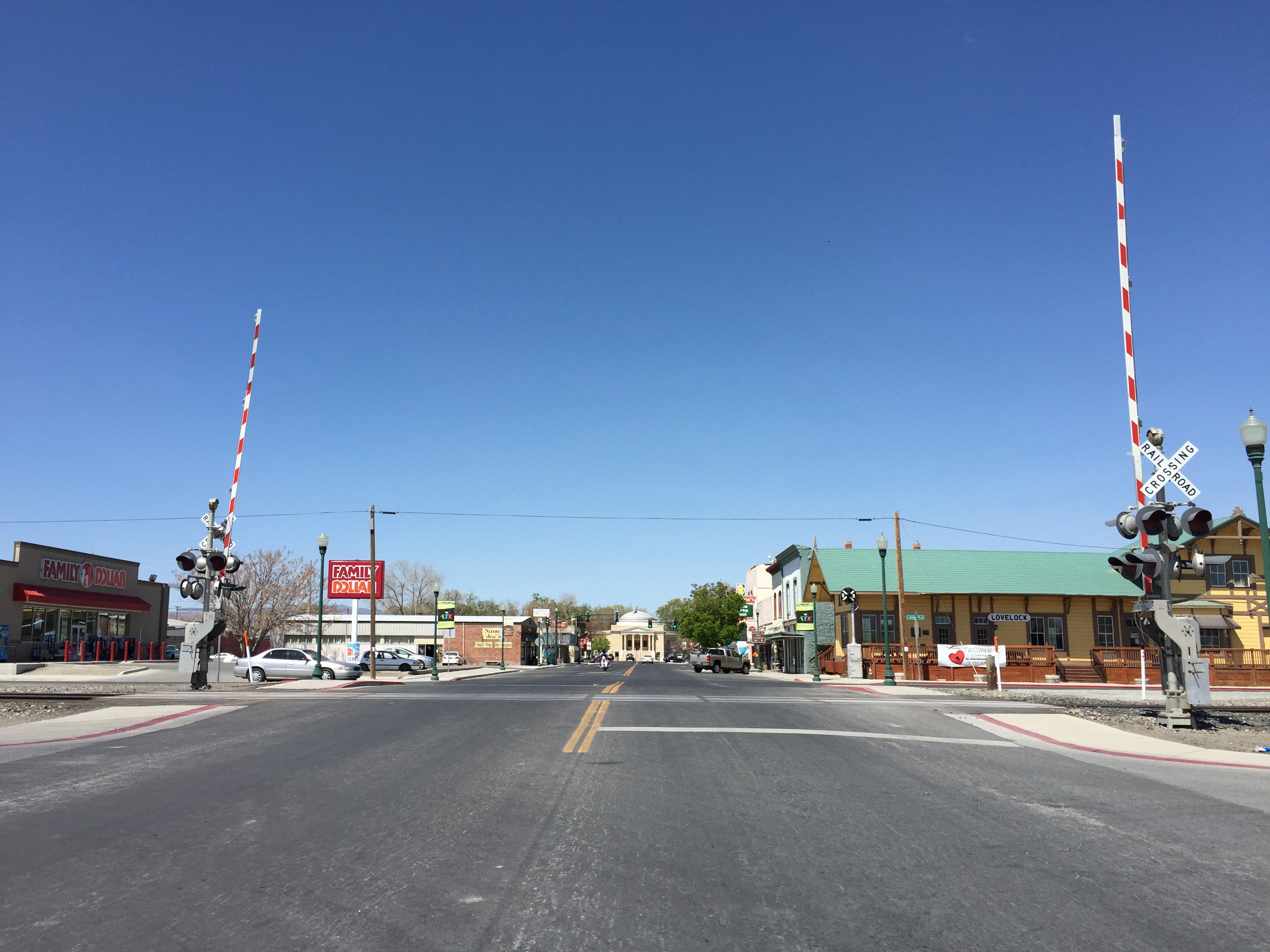
Main Street in Lovelock

Among the tourist events figure the I.D.E.S. Portuguese festival in May and what became the annual Frontier Days weekend in July. There are also hot air balloon races (Lovers Aloft, inaugurated in February 2004) and the Lovelock Street Fever car show, begun in June 2007. A major draw is the Lovers Lock Plaza in the shaded area at the back of the Court House where couples symbolise their love by attaching a padlock to an 'endless chain', a practice begun on Valentine's Day, 2005. The following year saw the construction of a dirt-racing track known as the Lovelock Speedway.

Lovelock's heritage buildings include the wooden built Grace Methodist Church on the corner of Cornell Avenue and 8th Street, dating from 1886. It was destroyed by fire in 1922 and the tower was rebuilt without the original spire; in 1983 the church was badly damaged by another fire and was restored again. Marzen House Museum is another Victorian building, built in 1874. The Italianate farmhouse was transported from Big Meadow Ranch in the 1980s and has on its site an assay office, farm machinery sheds, and buildings housing vintage automobiles, while inside it contains 1800s furnishings and a museum, shedding light on the area's history.

The Longhorn Bar beside the tracks on West Broadway is one of the few remaining commercial buildings in typical Nevada style. Not far away is the railroad depot dating from 1880. In 1999 it was presented to the town by the Union Pacific Railroad to be restored and moved to another lot for use as an eatery. This was registered as a historic building in 2004.

The Pershing County Courthouse was built in 1919. Pershing County officials approached Frederic Joseph DeLongchamps, by then the architect of six Nevada courthouses, and asked for a design that would be low in price but distinctive in appearance. As a solution, DeLongchamps designed a round courthouse, patterning it after Thomas Jefferson's library at the University of Virginia campus. The circle-over-hexagon design includes a circular interior hallway and a round courtroom decorated with Corinthian pilasters. A broad, sweeping concrete staircase leads to the main floor of the Beaux-Arts classical structure. Its entrance includes a pedimented portico supported by six Ionic columns. Doric pilasters separate the main story windows. Cream-colored brick and terracotta finish the exterior. A shallow dome crowns the roof and provides the courtroom with a dramatic, soaring ceiling.'

== Notable people ==
- Alan Bible, lawyer and politician
- Robert Heizer, archaeologist
- Joseph Lang, US Boxing team in the Los Angeles (1932) Olympic Games
- Adrian C. Louis, poet
- Wayde Preston, actor
- Edna Purviance, actress
- Charles H. Russell, 20th Governor of Nevada, 1951-1959
- Sarah Winnemucca, champion of the Paiute tribe, founded the Peabody Indian School in Lovelock
- Clarence Clifton Young, lawyer and politician

== Lovelock in the arts ==
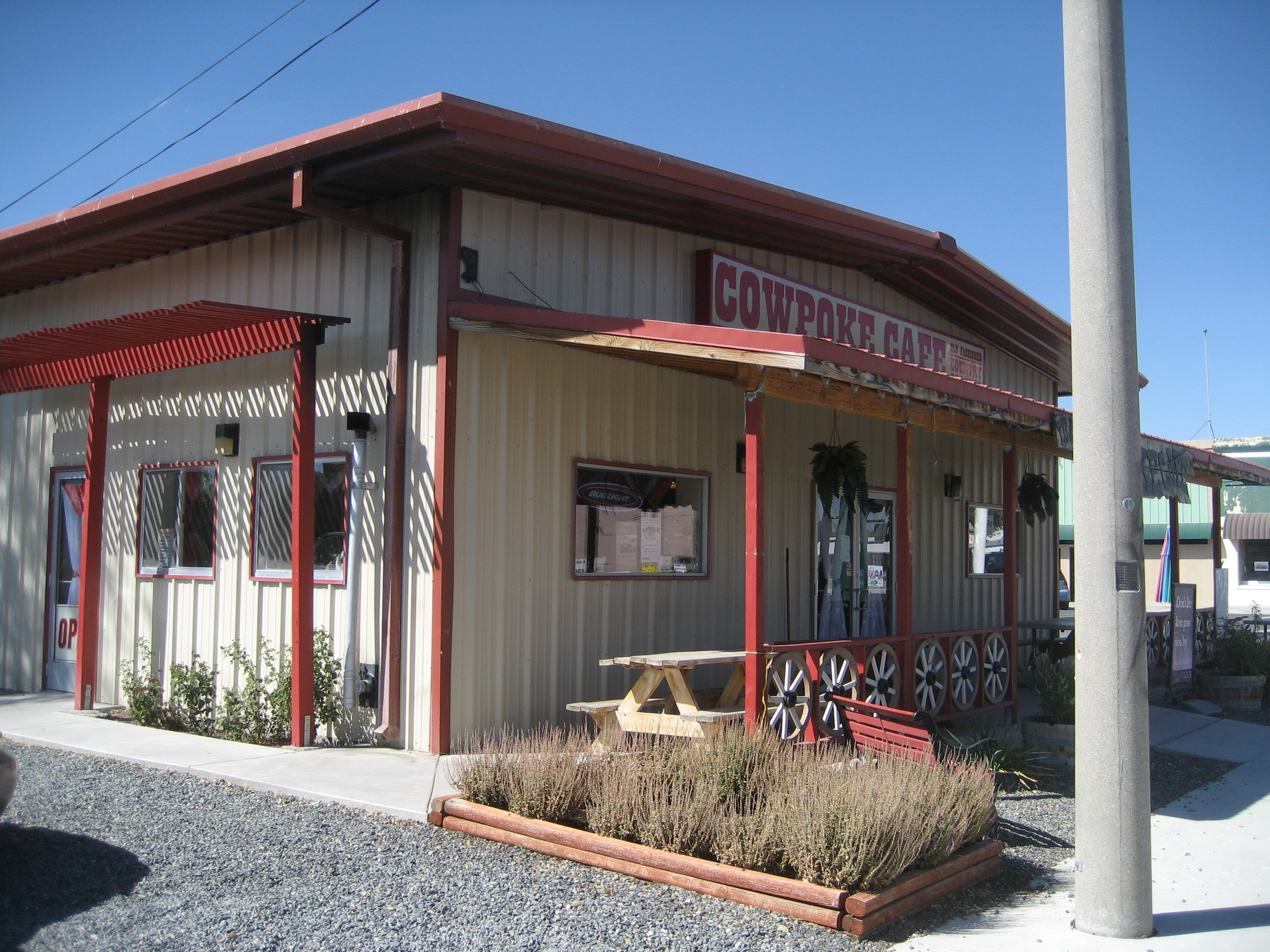
Cowpoke Cafe in Lovelock

=== Songs ===
Lovelock, with a population never much more than 2000, will generally be noticed only as a town passed on the way to somewhere else. Thus the debut album of the folk-rock band Center Divide, Lovelock to Winnemucca (1999), takes its title from a desert section of the I-80 highway and the opening track, simply titled “Lovelock”, takes its inspiration from the passing landscape. On the other hand, an interrupted journey is the subject of the Hot Buttered Rum string band's "Limbo in Lovelock" (Live in the Northeast 2007), where a motor breakdown leads to an enforced stop in the town and a visit to the local eatery, the Cowpoke Café.

=== Poetry and fiction ===
Lovelock has had a poet of its own in Adrian C. Louis, who was brought up on the small reservation for the Lovelock Paiute Indians there. Even after he moved on, its Indian Cemetery was a point of reference for him to which he often returned in memory:

I'm at that place I grew up to leave.
Alkali-crusted sand waves have drifted against my markers of blood.

Other poems in which the town's name figures record the impressions of passing travellers. They include Shaun T Griffin's broadside, "Rain outside Lovelock, late March” and two titles in the work of Kirk Robertson. "Lovelock to Twin Falls" dwells on abandoned shacks in the desert while “Monday Night, Lovelock” focuses on houses there surrounded by junk.

Stephen Bly's Wild West novel Dangerous Ride Across Humboldt Flats (Crossway Press, 2003) deals with the area along the river before the town was built. In the opening chapters, an orphaned Pony Express rider comes across Trent Lovelock and his family on Humboldt Flats in 1860 and is befriended by them. The author has acknowledged that he had the town's later founder in mind in his fictitious Trent Lovelock.

Another novel, Lovelock, Nevada: an explanation (Booklocker, 2010) by Leslie Hale Roberts, plays another variation on the transient theme, starting with a breakdown in the desert. And a stopover in the town was the subject of Fred Leebron's prize-winning short story “Lovelock”, later adapted into his novel Out West (Doubleday 1996). There an ex-convict staying overnight at a motel picks up a retarded woman and guiltily sees her and her sister off in their car the next morning.

=== Painting and sculpture ===
Lovelock's connection with the figurative arts has most often been the result of artists passing through the area and recording something that had caught their eye. One of the earliest such travellers was Thomas Moran, who caught the train south along the recently completed Central Pacific line in 1876 and sketched a thunderstorm over the nearby Humboldt Plain.

For later artists their local work was the result of travelling the country to create a series on a chosen theme. They have included a watercolor in Bethany Lee's 2016 landscapes with a focus on their vegetation, a view in Jessica Joy Jirsa's road sign series from 2018, and a casino restaurant in Jody Litton's continuing series recording the vernacular architecture of California and adjoining states. The landscape photographer John Pfahl also stopped by the town in 1978 to create two works: a shot of the "Lovelock Seed Co." at its southern end and "Lovelock gas station" at the north end.

Other painters were commissioned to create works in the town. Ejnar Hansen was invited by the Federal Art Project to paint a mural in the newly completed post-office building in 1940 and chose the discovery of the Comstock Lode as a local subject. In 1944 the gaming artist Franz Trevors (1907–80) was commissioned to paint six large canvases on Western subjects by a member of the local gambling industry and these were later installed in the casino at Felix's Bank Club on Main Street. For the main part the paintings were based on subjects by Charles Marion Russell but with original details of the artist's own.

Some artists have also chosen to live in Lovelock for a while. Among these was Buck Nimy (1906/11 – 1959), who made black and white drawings of cowboy subjects, some featuring local scenery after he settled in the town about 1940. More recently there has been Maggie Remington, whose speciality is to dig her own pigments from the desert earth to create her abstract designs. Also living there is Don Bridges, who was commissioned to create a memorial for the Emigrant Trail across the Forty-Mile Desert in 2016. Featuring steel reliefs of three oxen and a wagon, it was installed at the 105 freeway exit south of Lovelock, where it was also visible from trains passing nearby.
