= Long Valley (Nevada) =

Valley in Nevada, United States

- Location within Nevada
- Length: 25 mi (40 km) N-S
- Width: 5 mi (8.0 km) E-W

Geography
- Country: United States
- State: Nevada
- Region: (northwest)-Great Basin
- District: Washoe County
- Communities: Vya, NV
- Borders on: Hays Canyon Range-N & W
- Coordinates: 41°33′44″N 119°48′29″W
- Lakes: Alkali Lake; Boulder Lake (Nevada); Massacre Lake; Calcutta Lake
- Interactive map of Long Valley

Long Valley is an approximately 25-mile (40 km) long endorheic basin in the northern portion of Washoe County, Nevada in the northwest corner of Nevada. It is bordered by the Hays Canyon Range to the west, which gradually transitions into rolling hills north of the valley. To the east lies a large plateau, which is partially dissected by Massacre Lake Valley; this plateau eventually rises to over 7,000 feet in elevation as it rises toward the Sheldon National Wildlife Refuge.

== Description ==
Long Valley was descriptively so named on account of its length. Most of the valley floor consists of small playas, such as Calcutta Lake and Boulder Lake. The edges of the valley host various ranches; at the western edge of Long Valley is the ghost town of Vya, Nevada.

== Geology ==
As part of the events that ultimately led to the creation of the Basin and Range Province, during the late Pliocene and early Pleistocene, basalt was extruded in the Lake Valley region as the surrounding mountains were lifted and the valley floor dropped. Due to the lack of natural drainage in the valley, the valley periodically filled with water, transforming the valley into pluvial Lake Meinzer, which peaked at a maximum depth of 250 feet over the valley floor. Much of the valley is filled with deposits from the former lake.

== Access ==
From the west, Long Valley can be accessed from Cedarville, California via California State Route 299, which remains paved until the state border, at which point the road follows the decommissioned Nevada State Route 8A road bed into Vya. Near Vya, former Nevada State Route 8A intersects with Nevada State Route 34 (now Washoe County CR34), which provides access to Long Valley from Gerlach, Nevada to the south, and Coleman Valley Road, which cuts across Long Valley just north of Vya, veers just east of Calcutta Lake, then heads north toward Adel, Oregon. From the east, Long Valley can be accessed via Nevada State Route 140, which intersects with former Nevada State Route 8A between Denio Junction, Nevada and the Oregon border.

== See also ==
- List of valleys of Nevada
