= Nevada State Route 292 =

State highway in Nevada, United States

State Route 292
- Denio Road
- SR 292 highlighted in red

Route information
- Maintained by NDOT
- Length: 2.935 mi (4.723 km)
- Existed: 1976–present

Major junctions
- South end: SR 140 at Denio Junction
- North end: Harney County Route 201 at Denio

Location
- Country: United States
- State: Nevada
- Counties: Humboldt

Highway system
- Nevada State Highway System; Interstate; US; State; Pre‑1976; Scenic
← SR 290	→ SR 293

State Route 292 (SR 292) is a short state highway on the northern edge of Humboldt County, Nevada, United States, that serves the community of Denio.

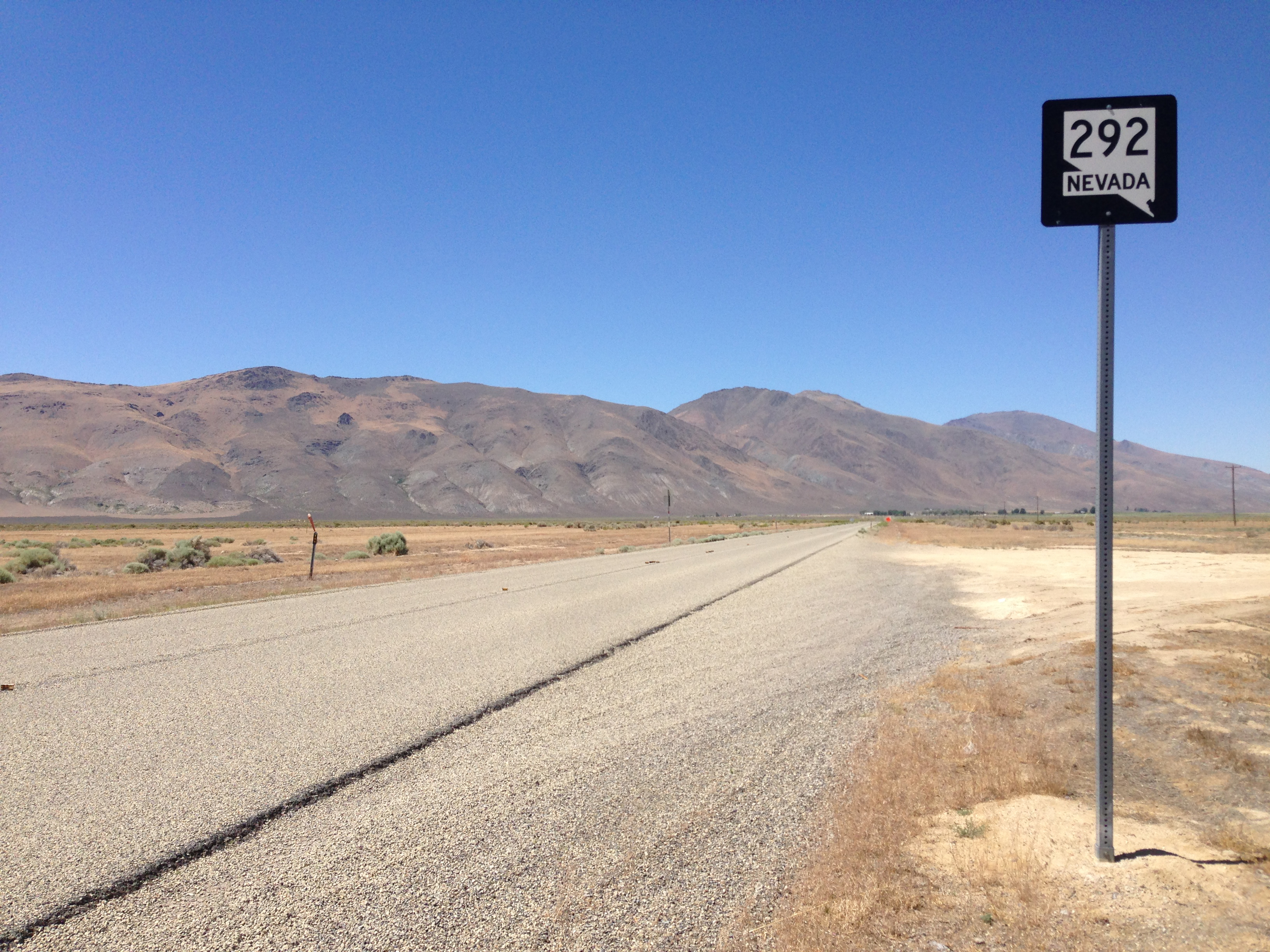
Looking north along SR 292 from near its south terminus in Denio Junction, with the Pueblo Mountains in the distance, July 2014

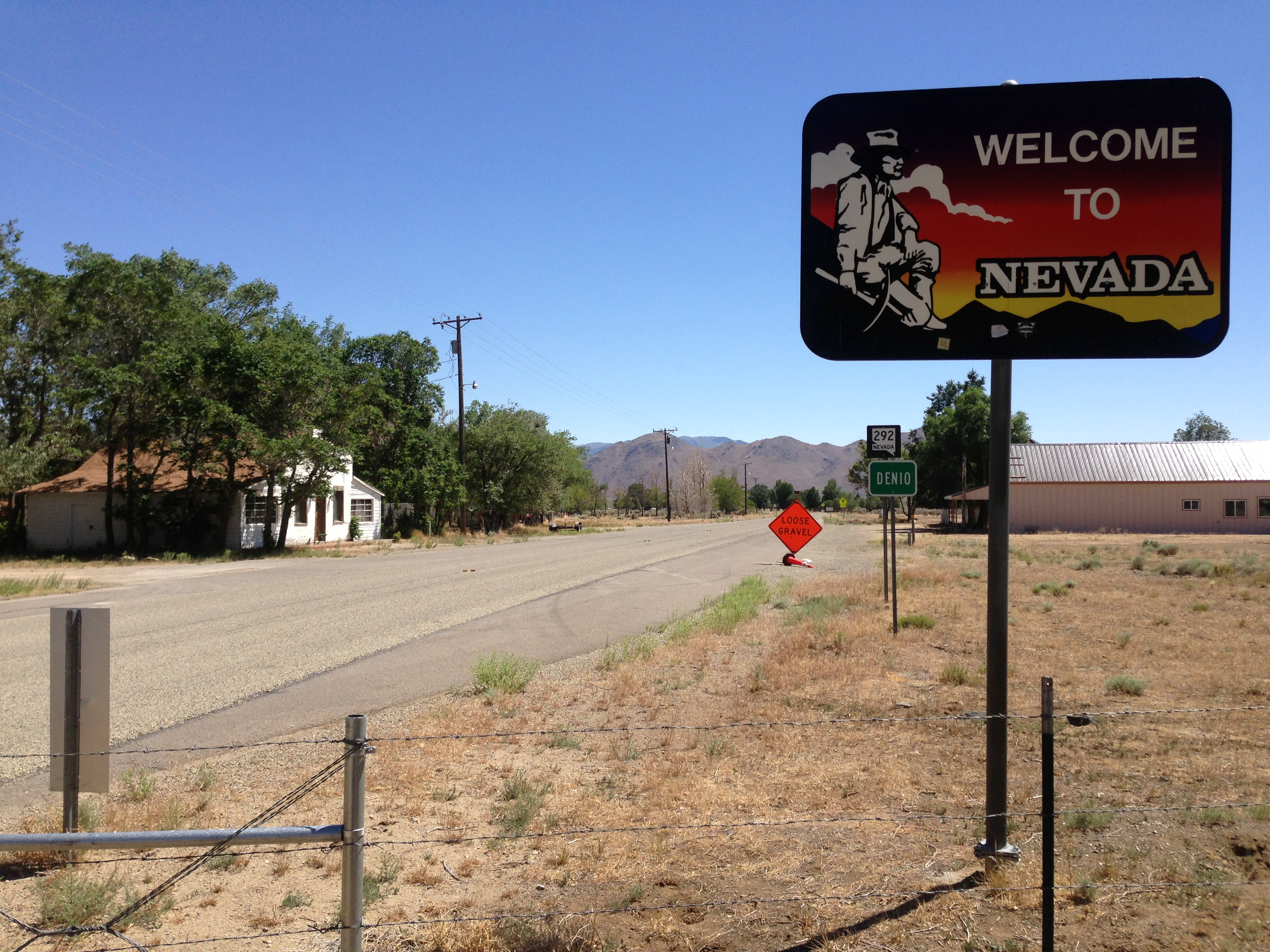
Looking south along SR 292 from its northern terminus in Denio, July 2014

== Route description ==
SR 292 is a two-lane road entirely within the southern part of the Pueblo Valley. The route begins at a T intersection with State Route 140 (SR 140) in Denio Junction. (From the intersection, southbound SR 140 heads south and then east to end at U.S. Route 95 [US 95], east-northeast of Amos. Northbound SR 140 heads westerly to the Oregon state line to connect with Oregon Route 140.) From its southern terminus SR 292 heads north, but slightly to the west, a distance of nearly 3 miles (4.8 km) to serve the community of Denio (a census-designated place). The route ends at the Oregon state line. From SR 292's northern terminus, the road continues northward into Oregon as Harney County Route 201 (Fields-Denio Road), heading towards Fields.

== History ==
SR 292 was originally part of the former State Route 8A. That route, established by 1929, connected State Route 8 (now US 95) to Vya via Denio. SR 8A was realigned to bypass Denio by 1949, leaving the highway into Denio without a state highway number. The road was designated as State Route 292 on July 1, 1976, as part of the renumbering of Nevada's state highway system. However, the new route number was not seen on official Nevada highway maps until 1993.

== Major intersections ==
The entire route is in Humboldt County.

Location	mi (Note: Mileposts on SR 292 are a continuation of State Route 140 mileposts.)	km	Destinations	Notes
Denio Junction	65.58	105.54	SR 140 – Winnemucca, McDermitt, Adel	Southern terminus
Denio	68.52	110.27	Harney County Route 201 (Fields-Denio Road) – Fields	Northern terminus; Continuation north beyond Oregon state line
1.000 mi = 1.609 km; 1.000 km = 0.621 mi

== See also ==
- List of state routes in Nevada
- List of highways numbered 292
