= Rebel Creek =

Rebel Creek may refer to:

- Rebel Creek (Nevada), a stream
- Rebel Creek, Nevada, an unincorporated community
