= Nevada State Route 34 =

Former highway in Nevada

State Route 34

Route information
- Existed: ?–1978

Major junctions
- South end: CR 447 in Gerlach
- Former SR 8A
- North end: Coleman Valley Road

Location
- Country: United States
- State: Nevada

Highway system
- Nevada State Highway System; Interstate; US; State; Pre‑1976; Scenic

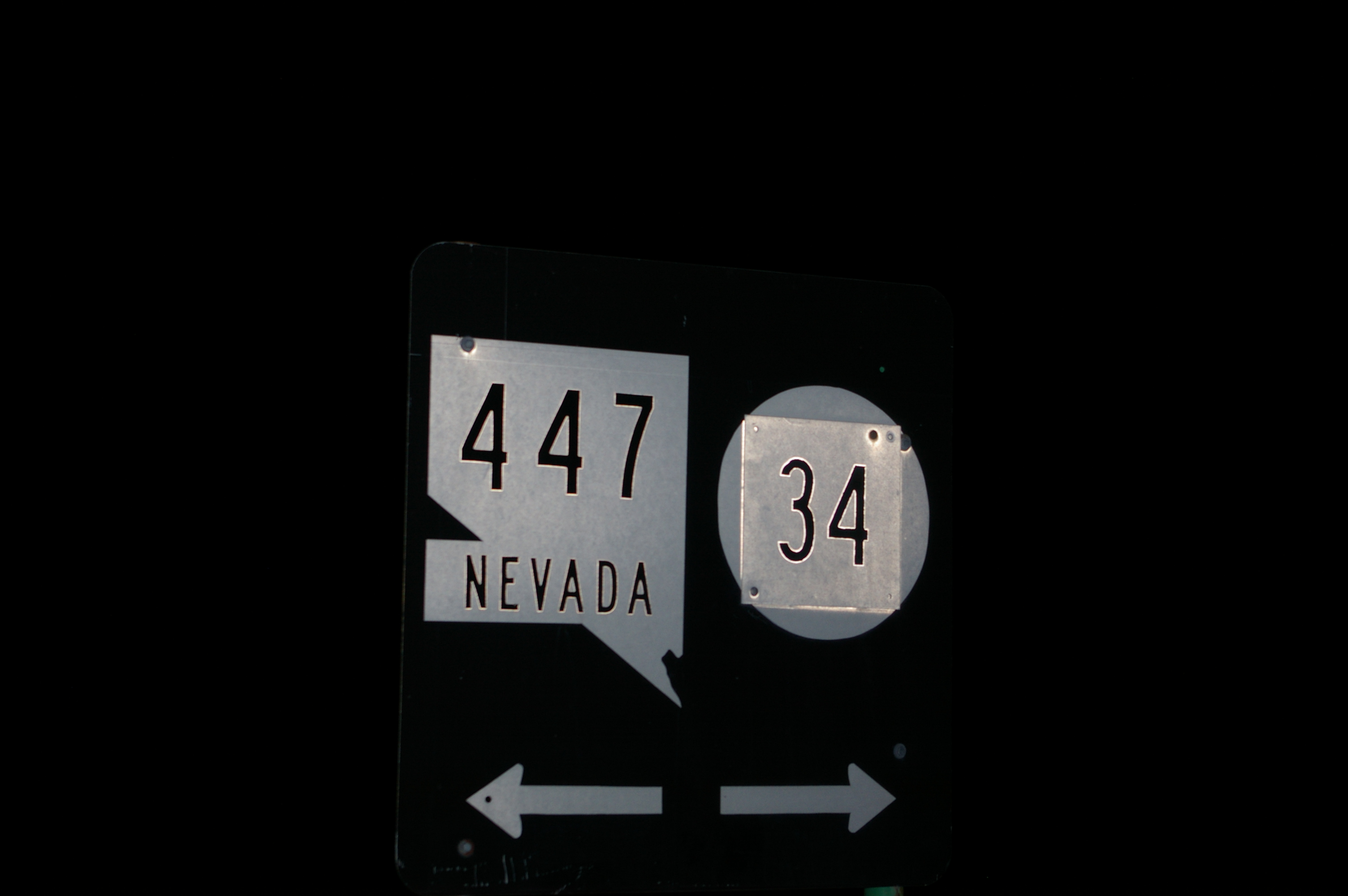
The junction of Nevada 447 and CR 34. Notice that the shield for CR 34 is a circle, this is to indicate that CR 34 is not a state route.

State Route 34 (SR 34) is a decommissioned state highway in Nevada from prior to the state's highway restructuring in 1978. Today, a portion of former SR 34 is maintained by Washoe County as County Road 34. A portion of SR 447 was formerly SR 34, though the former SR 34 road bed is still used from Gerlach to near Vya.

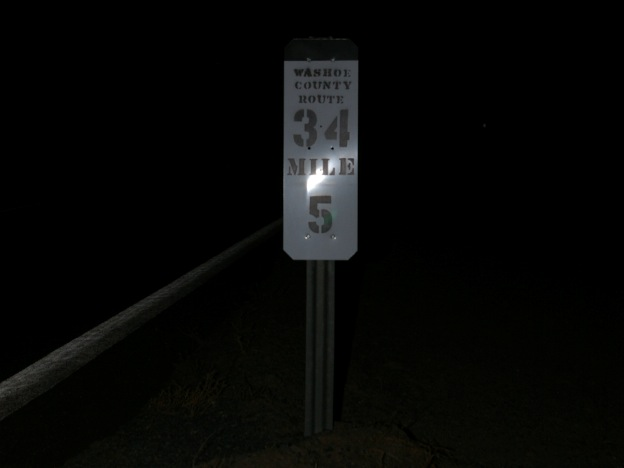
A milemarker for CR 34, located about 5 miles (8.0 km) north of Gerlach

== History ==
In the 1950s, the pavement ended and became gravel just past the sand dunes north of Nixon. In 1951, the pavement ended 9 miles (14 km) south of Gerlach. In 1953, the paving was still incomplete and State Route 81 from Gerlach to the California state line was not surfaced. By 1956, the road was paved to Gerlach and State Route 81 was partly paved from Gerlach to the California state line.

Before 1978, SR 34 followed the route of present-day SR 447 from Gerlach to Wadsworth.

== Major intersections ==
The entire route is in Washoe County.

Location	mi	km	Destinations	Notes
Gerlach			CR 447	To SR 447
			Northern terminus of CR 34 and southern terminus of SR 34	
Vya			SR 8A east	Southern end of SR 8A concurrency
			SR 8A west	Northern end of SR 8A concurrency
Oregon state line			Coleman Valley Road	To OR 140 – Adel, Lakeview, Denio
1.000 mi = 1.609 km; 1.000 km = 0.621 mi: Concurrency terminus; Route transition
