= Pueblo Mountain =

Mountain in Oregon, United States

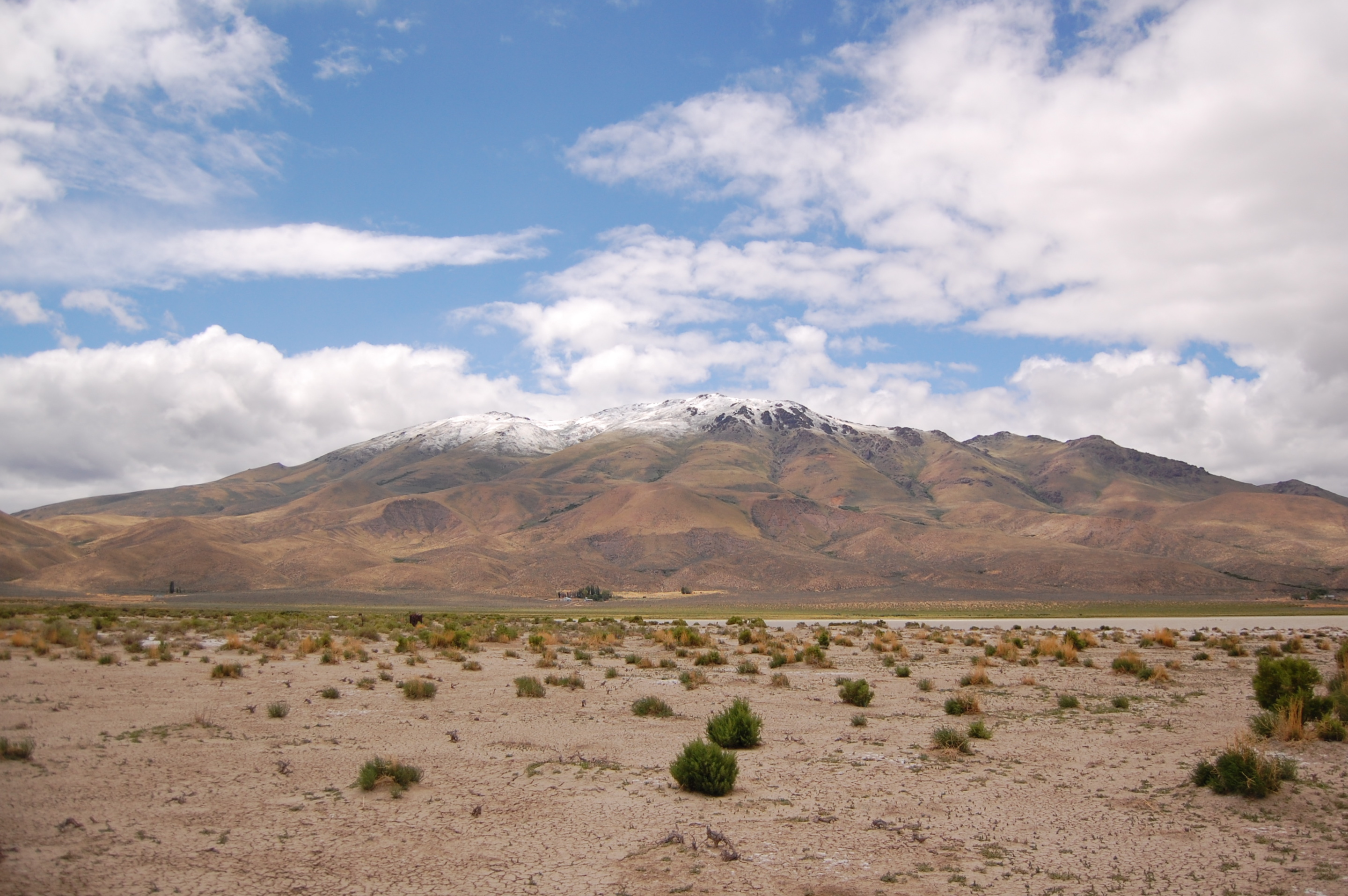
- Pueblo Mountain, as seen from south of Fields

Highest point
- Elevation: 8,639 ft (2,633 m) NAVD 88
- Prominence: 3,032 ft (924 m)
- Coordinates: 42°05′58″N 118°39′02″W

Geography
- Location within Oregon
- Location: Harney County, Oregon, U.S.
- Parent range: Pueblo Mountains
- Topo map: USGS Van Horn Basin

Pueblo Mountain is the highest mountain of the Pueblo Mountains mountain range, at 8,632 feet (2,631 m) in elevation. It is located in Harney County in southeastern Oregon, within the Great Basin region of the western United States. It is about 7.4 miles (11.9 km) north of the community of Denio on the Nevada border and about 37.3 miles (60.0 km) south of Steens Mountain.
