= Nevada State Route 140 =

State highway in Humboldt County, Nevada, United States

State Route 140

- Nevada State Route 140, highlighted in red.

Route information
- Maintained by NDOT
- Length: 110.113 mi (177.210 km)
- Existed: 1968–present

Major junctions
- Southeast end: US 95 north of Winnemucca
- Northwest end: OR 140 at the Oregon state line east of Adel, OR

Location
- Country: United States
- State: Nevada
- Counties: Humboldt

Highway system
- Nevada State Highway System; Interstate; US; State; Pre‑1976; Scenic
← SR 120	→ SR 146

State Route 140 (SR 140) is a two-lane state highway in Humboldt County, Nevada. It serves a sparsely populated section of the state, connecting northwestern Nevada to southern Oregon. Most of the highway was originally part of State Route 8A, and was later improved through an effort to provide an all-weather highway linking northern Nevada to the Pacific Northwest.

== Route description ==
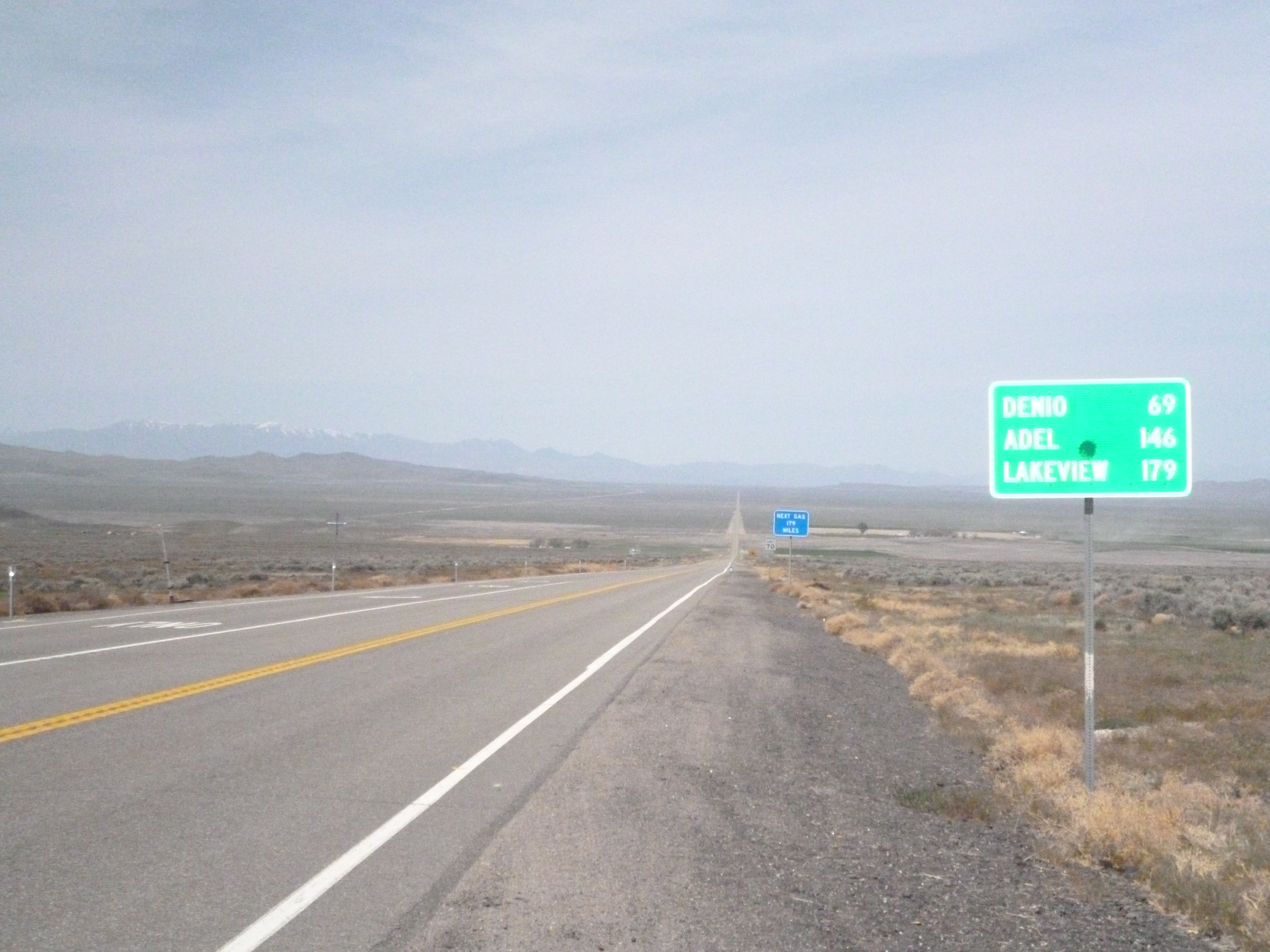
Westbound SR 140 near junction US 95

State Route 140 begins at a junction with U.S. Route 95 about 32 miles (51 km) north of Winnemucca in the Quinn River Valley. From this point, the highway heads west towards the sparsely populated regions of northwestern Nevada. SR 140 crosses into the Desert Valley before entering a branch of the Fort McDermitt Indian Reservation. Inside the reservation, the route crosses the Quinn River. Upon exiting the Indian territory, SR 140 curves northwest to parallel the Quinn River for about 10 miles (16 km) as it rounds the northern edge of the Jackson Mountains. As the river turns southeast towards the Black Rock Desert, the highway continues its northwest trajectory through the valley between the Bilk Creek Mountains on the east and the Pine Forest Range to the west. The route crosses over the 4,820-foot (1,470 m) Denio Summit before reaching Denio Junction. State Route 292 intersects the highway here, providing access to Denio, the only town in this region of Nevada.

At Denio Junction, State Route 140 turns westward past the south end of the Pueblo Mountains. About 15 miles (24 km) from the junction, the highway enters Virgin Creek Valley. The valley has been known for its black fire-opals, and some mining operations in the area will allow civilians to hunt for the precious stones for a fee. Near this valley, SR 140 enters the Sheldon National Wildlife Refuge, an area designed to provide habitat for pronghorn and conserve native fish, bird and plant species. The highway travels about 25 miles (40 km) through the wildlife range towards the Oregon state line. SR 140 ends at the border in the northwest corner of Humboldt County, with Oregon Route 140 continuing northwest towards Adel and Lakeview.

== History ==
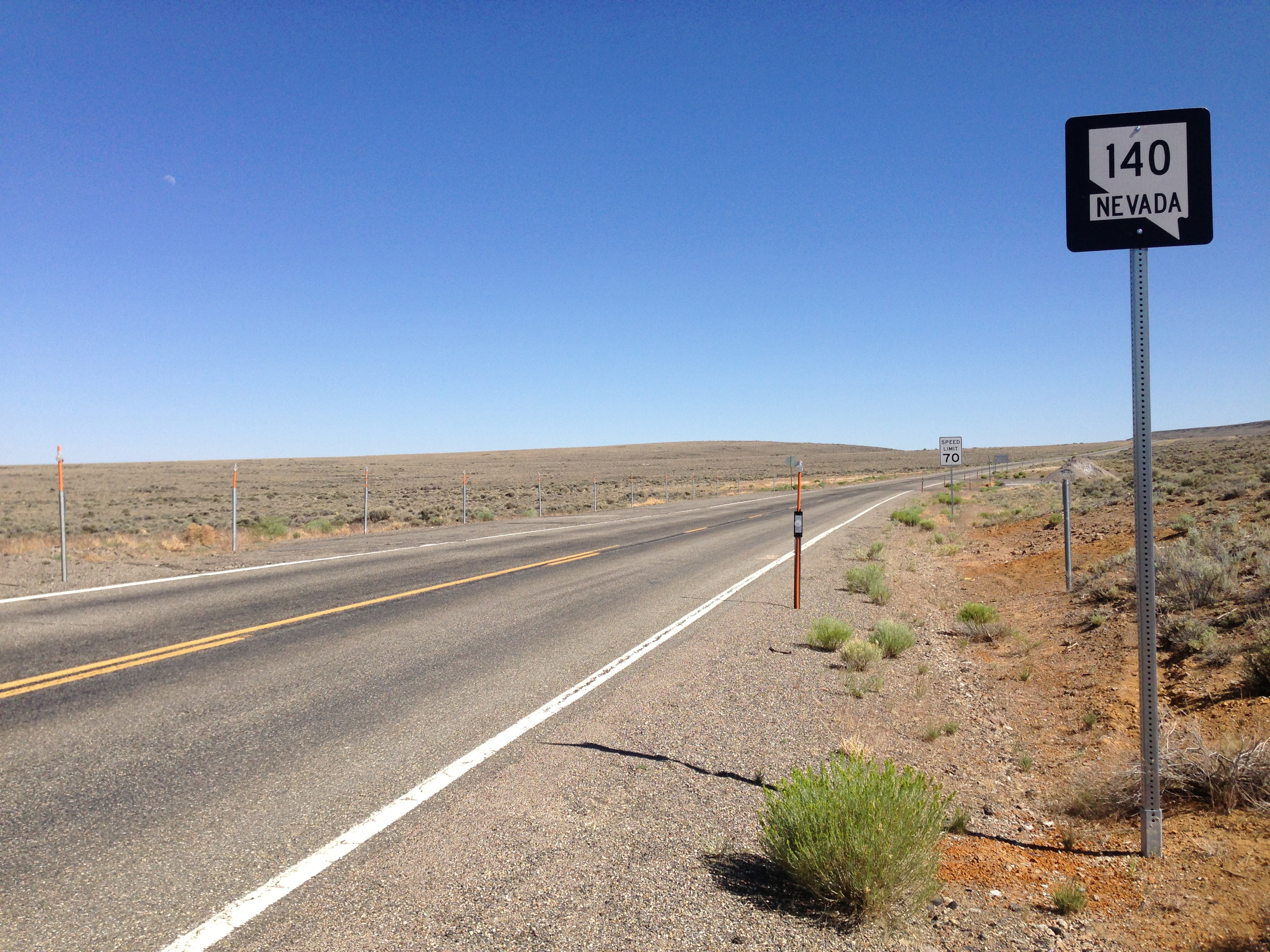
First reassurance shield along eastbound SR 140 after crossing the Oregon border

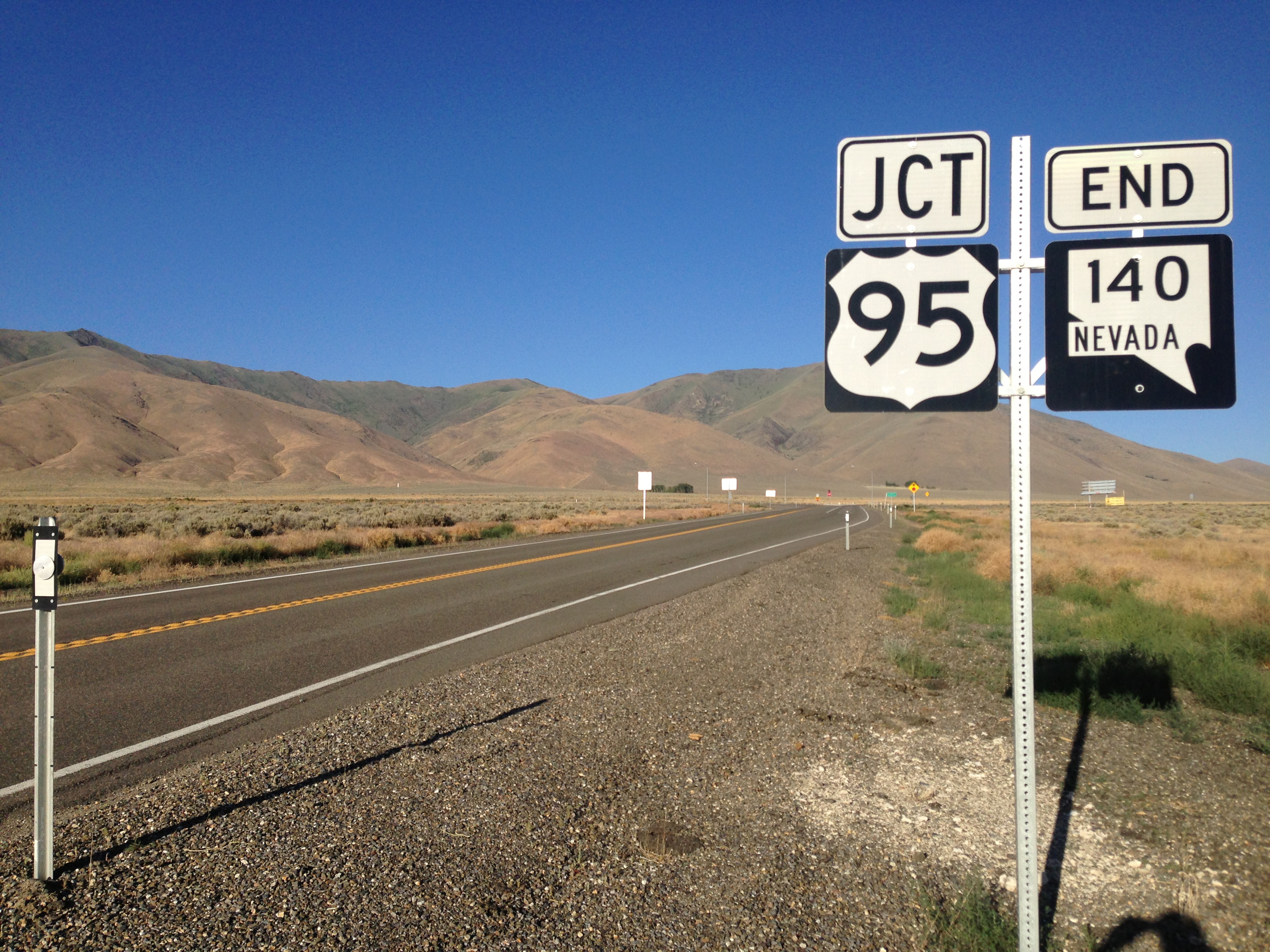
Eastern terminus at US 95

Much of the State Route 140 alignment can be traced to the early years of Nevada's state highway system. A road roughly following about 100 miles (160 km) of the southern end of the current alignment was in place by 1919. However, instead of entering Oregon en route to Adel, the road veered westward through Washoe County towards Vya and Cedarville, California. By 1929, this alignment had been established as State Route 8A. The highway remained mostly unimproved for many years after being designated by the state. The portion of the highway from US 95 to Denio became a gravel road by 1940 and was not fully paved until 1953. The route was realigned near Denio Junction by 1949 (eliminating backtracking through Denio) and the portion between Denio and the California state line had been improved to a fully graveled road by 1952.

In the 1950s, a push began for an all-weather route connecting northwestern Nevada, southern Oregon, and the redwood region of California—at the time, there were no improved roads directly connecting these areas. Community leaders along the route formed an association to promote what they called the "Winnemucca to the Sea Highway". Efforts to realize the association's goals moved forward in the next decade. By 1960, Nevada officials had paved a portion of State Route 8A west of Denio. Instead of following SR 8A to Vya, the newly paved road curved northwest to the Oregon border near the Humboldt-Washoe county line. Oregon officials constructed a new paved road linking Adel to the Nevada state line in 1962. This work completed the 117-mile (188 km) stretch of Winnemucca to the Sea Highway between Denio Junction and Lakeview, Oregon. The Winnemucca to the Sea Association, however, envisioned Route 140 as a continuous number—branching from "parent" highway U.S. Route 40 in Winnemucca—that would be applied to the entire length of highway, ostensibly trying to gain the "U.S. Route 140" moniker. By 1968, State Route 140 had been designated along the paved portions of SR 8A, with Oregon Route 140 continuing on to Adel and Lakeview. State Route 140 was also signed along US 95 south into Winnemucca—this section of SR 140 was later removed in the 1970s, around the same time as its "parent route" US 40 was decommissioned in Nevada.

When Nevada officials began the process of renumbering the state's highways in 1976, SR 140 was planned to be redesignated as State Route 291. The proposed route number was first seen on the 1978 version of the state's highway map. Once the renumbering process was finished in the early 1980s, the highway retained the State Route 140 designation it has today. The route has remained relatively unchanged since.

== Major intersections ==
The entire route is in Humboldt County.

Location	mi	km	Destinations	Notes
	0.00	0.00	US 95 – Winnemucca, McDermitt	Eastern terminus
Denio Junction	65.58	105.54	SR 292 north – Denio	
	100	161	Former SR 8A – Vya, Cedarville	
	110.11	177.20	OR 140 west – Adel	Continuation beyond western terminus at Oregon state line
1.000 mi = 1.609 km; 1.000 km = 0.621 mi

== See also ==
Other segments of former State Route 8A:

- State Route 305, the central segment that ran from Austin to Battle Mountain.
- State Route 376, the southern segment that ran from near Tonopah to near Austin.
