= Sheldon National Wildlife Refuge =

Wildlife refuge in Nevada and Oregon, U.S.

- IUCN category IV (habitat/species management area)
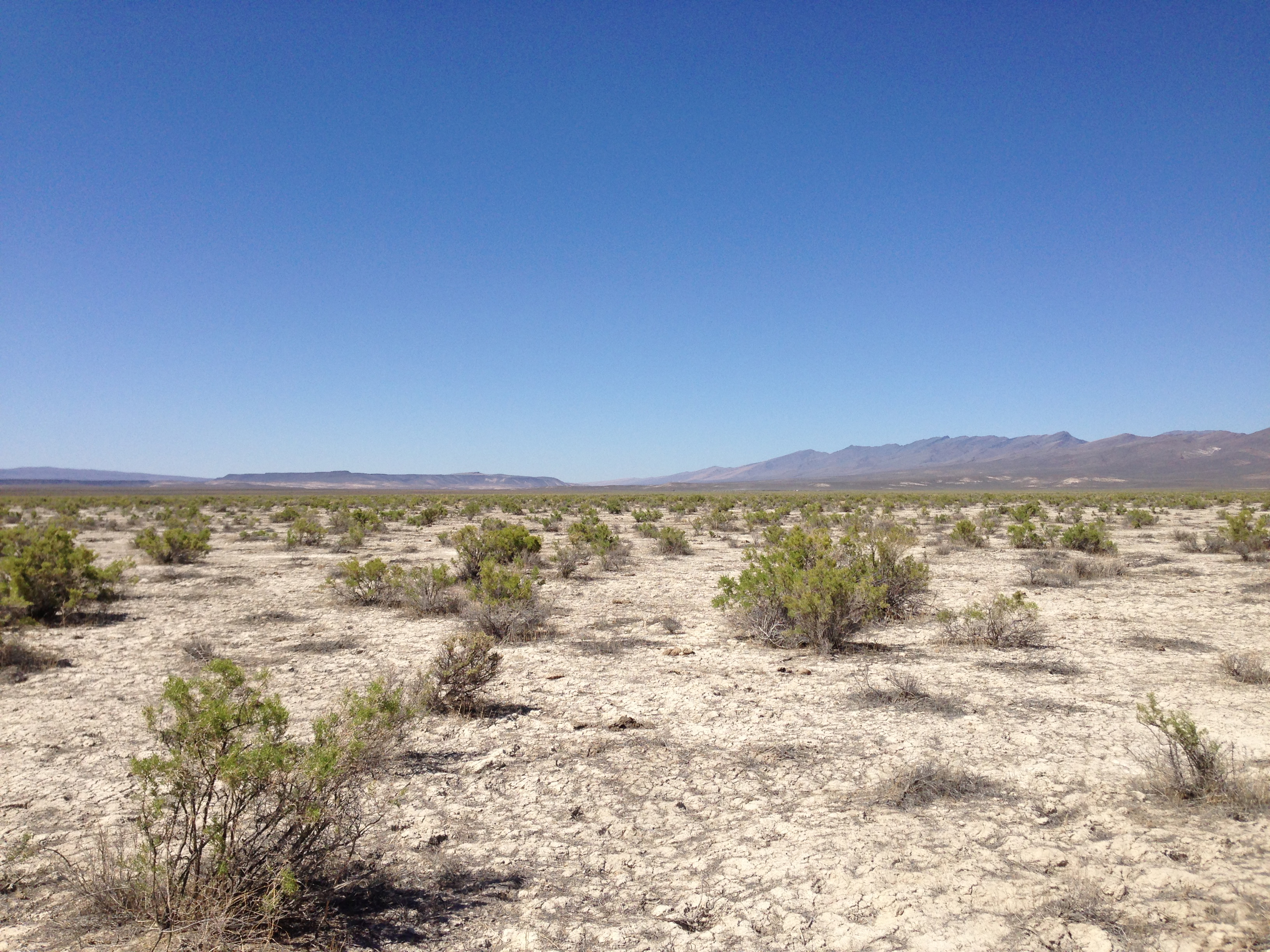
- Desert vegetation near the eastern edge of the refuge

- Location within Nevada
- Location: Humboldt and Washoe counties, Nevada
- Nearest city: Lakeview, Oregon
- Coordinates: 41°48′00″N 119°12′04″W
- Area: 573,504 acres (232,089 ha)
- Established: 1931
- Governing body: U.S. Fish and Wildlife Service
- Website: Sheldon NWR

The Sheldon National Wildlife Refuge is a 573,504-acre (232,089 ha) national wildlife refuge on the northern border of the U.S. state of Nevada. A very small part extends northward into Oregon. It is managed by the United States Fish and Wildlife Service (USFWS) as the Nevada component of the Sheldon-Hart Mountain National Wildlife Refuge Complex, which is headquartered in Lakeview, Oregon. The Sheldon Refuge was noted for its population of wild horses, now all removed.

== History ==
In 1931, the refuge was established under executive order to carry out three central goals: First, the refuge was to provide a habitat for the "antelope" (more properly called the pronghorn), an animal whose population was in decline during the early 1900s. Second, conservation efforts were put forth to protect native fish, wildlife, and plants. The refuge contains the Virgin Valley Opal Mining District which was grandfathered in with its mineral rights. Finally, the refuge was to serve as an inviolate migratory bird sanctuary.

== Description ==
Advocates characterize Sheldon as one of the few intact sagebrush steppe ecosystems in the Great Basin, one that hosts a variety of wildlife endemic to the unique environment.

The Sheldon National Wildlife Refuge occupies an arid zone of volcanic terrain. The elevation ranges from 4,100 feet (1,200 m) to 7,200 feet (2,200 m) above sea level. Geothermal hot springs provide some water to a swimming pool and shower house in the campground.

=== Flora and fauna ===
The dominant plant life consists of drought-tolerant species such as sagebrush, juniper, mountain mahogany, bitterbrush, and aspen.

In this forbidding landscape lives a large population of free-range fauna. Desert fishes, greater sage-grouse, migratory birds, mule deer, and the pygmy rabbit are all residents, with the pronghorn – North America's fastest land mammal – being the best known and numbering around 3,500. There are also large herds of mule deer, and a small but self-sustaining population of bighorn sheep.

The bighorn is not strictly native to the Sheldon Refuge, having been extirpated there during the frontier era and re-introduced about 1930. The pronghorn played a key role in the refuge's history, as approximately 94 percent of the current protected land area was originally set aside as the Charles Sheldon Antelope Range in 1936. The refuge is the home of the Alvord chub, an endemic fish species of limited geographic distribution.

Formerly the wildlife reserve hosted mustang, feral horses, but by 2014 these had all been removed (see below).

=== Minerals ===
Opal miners have been active in the valley since 1906. The refuge contains the very active and popular Virgin Valley Opal Mining District whose mineral rights were grandfathered-in with the establishment of the sanctuary. Rockhounds search for precious opal, agates, petrified wood, carnelian, obsidian, rhyolite, jasper, hyalite opal, and psilomelane, among other semiprecious gemstones.

The Virgin Valley Mining District is known for black opals, the Nevada State Gemstone, still very active with multiple fee-dig mines.

== Climate ==
Denio 52 WSW is a weather station located within the Sheldon National Wildlife Refuge, near Yellow Peak (Nevada). Sheldon National Wildlife Refuge has a cold semi-arid climate (Köppen BSk).

Climate data for Denio 52 WSW, Nevada, 1991–2020 normals, 1933-2020 extremes: 6500ft (1981m)
Month	Jan	Feb	Mar	Apr	May	Jun	Jul	Aug	Sep	Oct	Nov	Dec	Year
Record high °F (°C)	56 (13)	58 (14)	69 (21)	76 (24)	83 (28)	90 (32)	97 (36)	100 (38)	93 (34)	82 (28)	69 (21)	62 (17)	100 (38)
Mean maximum °F (°C)	48.2 (9.0)	48.4 (9.1)	55.7 (13.2)	66.1 (18.9)	74.6 (23.7)	81.9 (27.7)	88.2 (31.2)	87.8 (31.0)	82.9 (28.3)	73.9 (23.3)	59.8 (15.4)	51.0 (10.6)	88.7 (31.5)
Mean daily maximum °F (°C)	34.7 (1.5)	35.2 (1.8)	43.2 (6.2)	49.2 (9.6)	58.3 (14.6)	68.3 (20.2)	79.4 (26.3)	78.4 (25.8)	70.8 (21.6)	57.0 (13.9)	42.0 (5.6)	33.2 (0.7)	54.1 (12.3)
Daily mean °F (°C)	28.3 (−2.1)	27.8 (−2.3)	33.2 (0.7)	37.9 (3.3)	45.9 (7.7)	54.5 (12.5)	63.5 (17.5)	62.9 (17.2)	56.3 (13.5)	44.4 (6.9)	33.5 (0.8)	26.4 (−3.1)	42.9 (6.1)
Mean daily minimum °F (°C)	21.9 (−5.6)	20.4 (−6.4)	23.1 (−4.9)	26.7 (−2.9)	33.5 (0.8)	40.7 (4.8)	47.6 (8.7)	47.4 (8.6)	41.7 (5.4)	31.8 (−0.1)	25.1 (−3.8)	19.7 (−6.8)	31.6 (−0.2)
Mean minimum °F (°C)	−5.3 (−20.7)	0.5 (−17.5)	2.9 (−16.2)	11.8 (−11.2)	16.8 (−8.4)	24.4 (−4.2)	31.7 (−0.2)	30.5 (−0.8)	20.7 (−6.3)	14.1 (−9.9)	5.4 (−14.8)	−1.1 (−18.4)	−9.0 (−22.8)
Record low °F (°C)	−29 (−34)	−16 (−27)	−13 (−25)	2 (−17)	7 (−14)	17 (−8)	23 (−5)	22 (−6)	10 (−12)	−3 (−19)	−11 (−24)	−14 (−26)	−29 (−34)
Average precipitation inches (mm)	2.01 (51)	1.40 (36)	1.97 (50)	1.94 (49)	1.51 (38)	0.99 (25)	0.36 (9.1)	0.33 (8.4)	0.53 (13)	0.98 (25)	1.61 (41)	1.87 (47)	15.5 (392.5)
Source 1: NOAA
Source 2: XMACIS2 (Sheldon records & monthly max/mins)

== Roads and nearby communities ==
A point within the refuge is also the farthest place in the contiguous US from a McDonald's restaurant, at just 115 miles (185 kilometers).

Nevada State Route 140 traverses the refuge from east to west and is the only paved road within the refuge. The nearest community of any size is Denio, Nevada, 14 miles from the refuge's eastern boundary. The nearest divided highway is Interstate 80 in Winnemucca, Nevada, approximately 100 miles to the south. County Road (formerly Nevada State Route) 8A connects to California State Route 299, which then connects to Cedarville, California and eventually Crescent City, California.

== Feral horse controversy ==
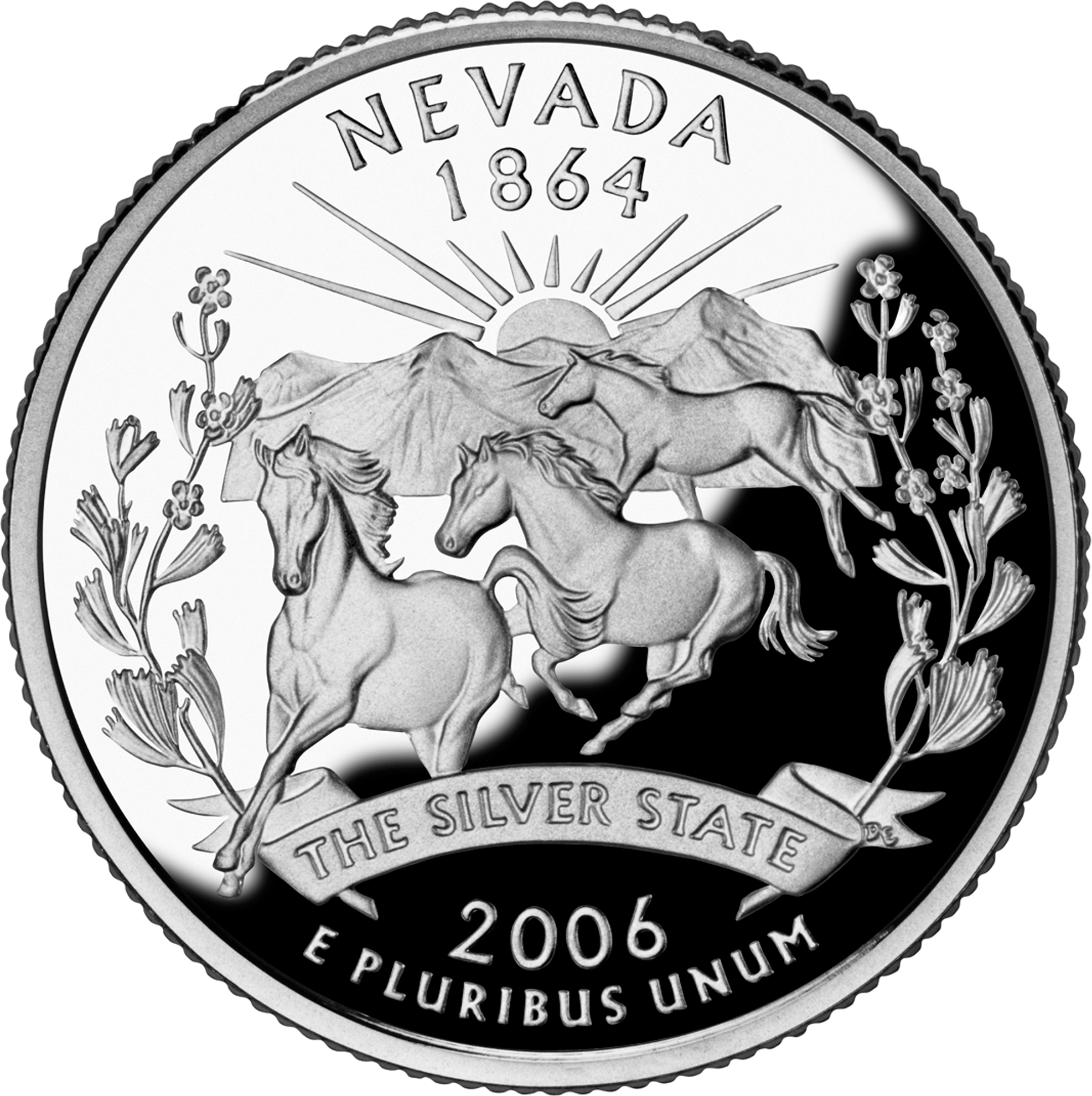
Nevada mustang featured on state quarter

The population of Sheldon horses was the descendants of horses used by the U.S. Army. Harry Wilson was one of the ranchers that sold horses to the U.S. cavalry. When the Wilsons owned the Virgin Valley Ranch, they worked with the Army, which provided thoroughbred stallions that were bred with the Wilsons' standardbreds.

Proposals to cull some of the alleged excess population of the mustang in the Sheldon National Wildlife Refuge were drawing public concern as of 2008. The official USFWS position, as stated on their refuge's website, was "horses and burros are not native to Sheldon Refuge. They are descended from domestic stock turned loose around the turn of the twentieth century. They are primarily grass eaters, and their grazing can devastate native vegetation and cause severe damage to riparian habitat." Some private-sector advocates, such as the Sierra Club, agree with the USFWS position.

In response, the American Wild Horse Preservation Campaign has accused the USFWS of conducting "helicopter round-ups during foaling season" in the Sheldon Refuge. Due to the negative impact horses and burros have on riparian areas and the resulting strain on native wildlife, Sheldon NWR officials announced a decision to remove all horses from the refuge by 2014 and they all were removed.
