= Nevada State Route 293 =

State highway in Nevada, United States

State Route 293
- Kings River Valley Road
- SR 293 highlighted in red

Route information
- Maintained by NDOT
- Length: 23.989 mi (38.607 km)
- Existed: 1976–present

Major junctions
- West end: Kings River Valley
- East end: US 95 at Orovada

Location
- Country: United States
- State: Nevada

Highway system
- Nevada State Highway System; Interstate; US; State; Pre‑1976; Scenic
← SR 292	→ SR 294

State Route 293 (SR 293) is a state highway in Humboldt County, Nevada. It connects the Kings River Valley to U.S. Route 95 at the town of Orovada.

== Route description ==
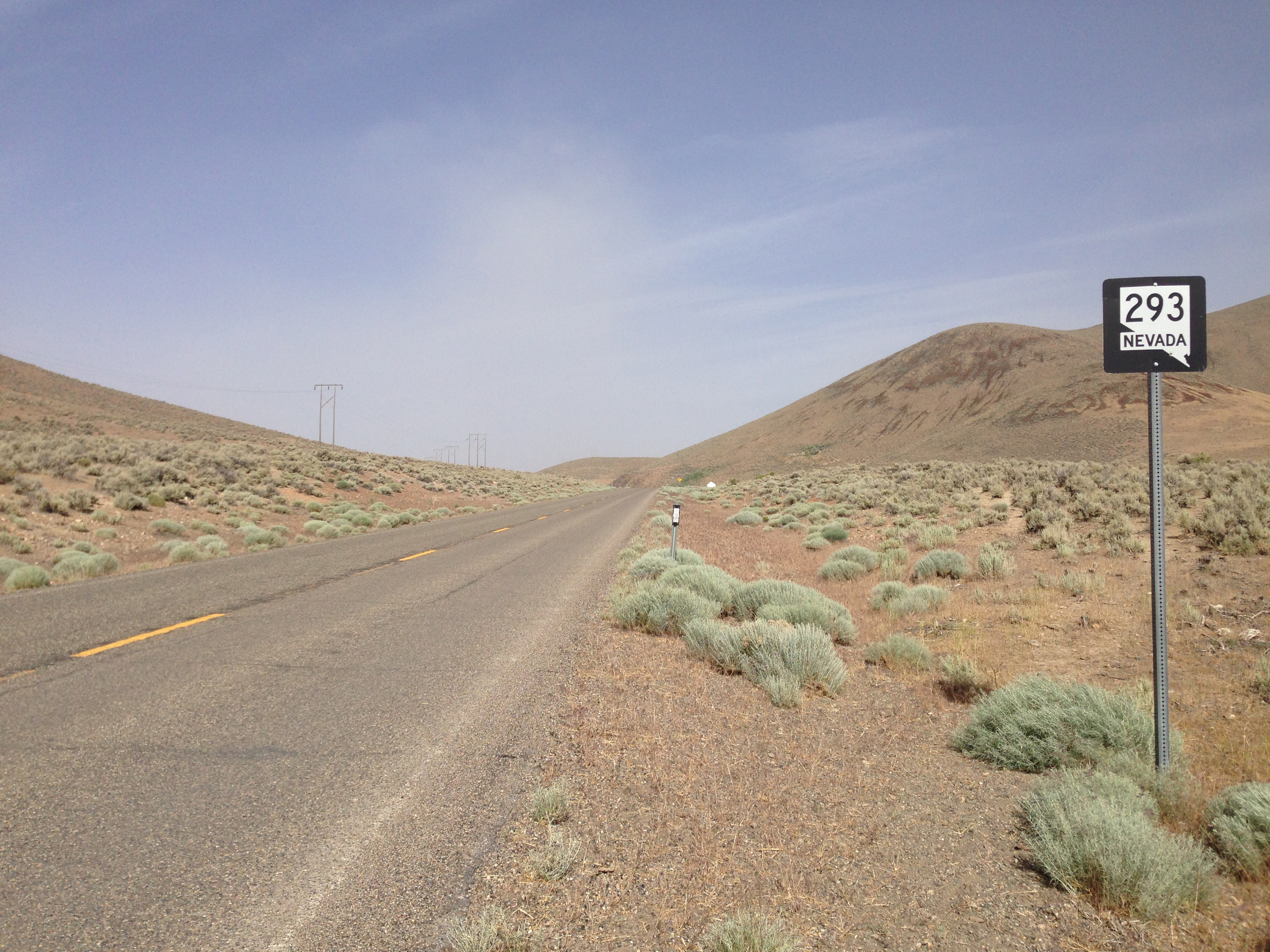
View from the west end of SR 293 looking eastbound

SR 293 begins at a Nevada Department of Transportation monument in the north-central portion of Humboldt County, just a few miles east of the Kings River. From there, the route heads east through a mountain pass and then southward. After crossing the Quinn River, SR 293 heads eastward through the Quinn River Valley to its terminus at US 95 at the town of Orovada.

== History ==
The road first appears on official state maps 1968, although it was not labeled as being part of Nevada's numbered highway system at that time. The highway was fully paved by 1971 but still had no route number on the state map. The entire road was removed from state highway maps entirely beginning with the 1973 edition. Despite this, the highway officially became State Route 293 on July 1, 1976, when Nevada officials began renumbering the state's numbered routes. The road returned to the state highway map, complete with the SR 293 designation, in the 1982 edition.

== Major intersections ==
The entire route is in Humboldt County.

Location	mi	km	Destinations	Notes
	23.99	38.61	Kings River Valley	
Orovada	0.00	0.00	US 95 – Winnemucca, McDermitt	
1.000 mi = 1.609 km; 1.000 km = 0.621 mi
