= Winnemucca Sand Dunes =

Coordinates: 41°07′N 117°45′W

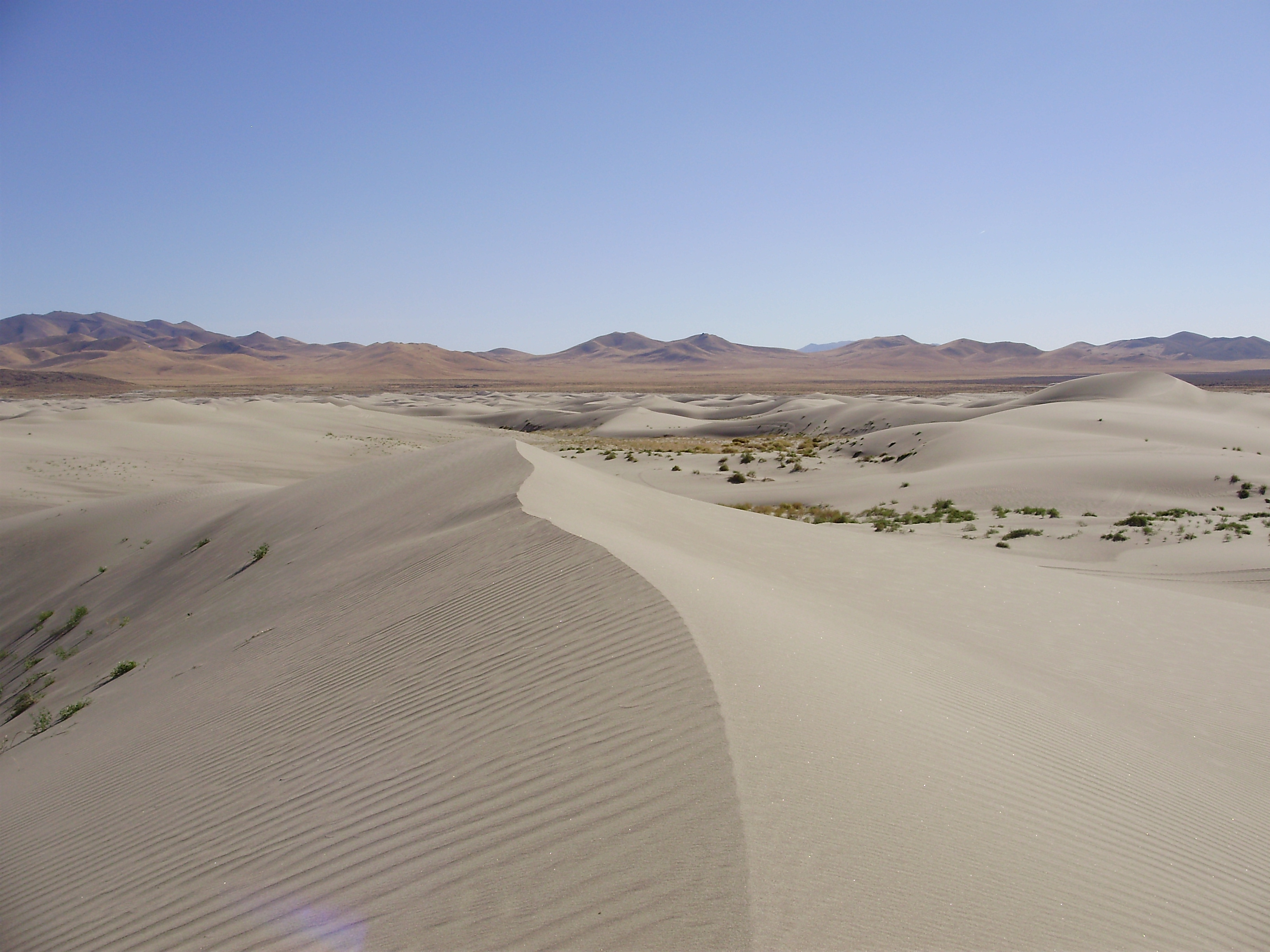
The Winnemucca Sand Dunes

The Winnemucca Sand Dunes are an area of sand dunes in Humboldt County, Nevada. While less than 100 feet (30 m) tall, the dunes span an area of approximately 40 miles (64 km) from east to west across the southern portion of the county. They are located north of the city of Winnemucca, their namesake, along U.S. Route 95. Ownership of the dunes is a checkerboard mixture of private holdings and BLM land. Activities on the dunes include sightseeing and ATV riding.

Portions of the 1926 film The Winning of Barbara Worth were filmed at these dunes.
