= Amos, Nevada =

Unincorporated community located in the State of Nevada, United States

Coordinates: 41°23′24″N 117°48′33″W

Amos was an unincorporated community in Humboldt County, in the U.S. state of Nevada.

== History ==
A post office called Amos was in operation between 1889 and 1926. According to the Federal Writers' Project, the first permanent settlement at Amos was made in 1910.
