= Tule, Nevada =

Unincorporated community in Nevada, US

- Unincorporated community
- Location within Nevada Location within the United States
- Coordinates: 41°01′27″N 117°39′00″W
- Country: United States
- State: Nevada
- County: Humboldt
- Elevation: 4,321 ft (1,317 m)
- Time zone: UTC-8 (Pacific (PST))
  - Summer (DST): UTC-7 (PDT)
- Area code: 775
- GNIS feature ID: 856155

Tule is an unincorporated community in Humboldt County, Nevada, United States.

Tule was a station east of Weso on the Southern Pacific Railroad with the first reference from a 1881 map. The name comes from the Nahuatl word "tollin", which means bullrush.

An 1890 book includes Tule in a list of towns and settlements in Humboldt County.
