= Nevada State Route 8A =

Former highway in Nevada

State Route 8A

Route information
- Existed: 1929–1976

Section 1
- West end: SR 299 at the California state line near Cedarville, CA
- East end: SR 140

Section 2
- South end: US 6 near Tonopah
- North end: US 40 in Battle Mountain

Location
- Country: United States
- State: Nevada
- Counties: Washoe, Humboldt, Nye, Lander

Highway system
- Nevada State Highway System; Interstate; US; State; Pre‑1976; Scenic

Former State Route 8A (SR 8A) was a two-part state highway in the U.S. state of Nevada, running from California State Route 299 in a general easterly and southeasterly direction via Vya and Denio to US 95 north of Winnemucca, and south from US 40 at Battle Mountain via Austin to US 6 near Tonopah. It was a branch of State Route 8, which followed US 95 north from US 40 at Winnemucca to Oregon. The part northwest from US 95 towards the Oregon state line later became State Route 140, part of the Winnemucca to the Sea Highway. In the late 1970s renumbering, the north–south portion became State Route 305 (Battle Mountain to Austin) and State Route 376 (Austin to Tonopah), but the portion from SR 140 west to California did not remain in the state highway system. (SR 140 was to be renumbered to State Route 291, but this was not carried through.) However, signs remain on that segment, and so SR 8A still de facto connects SR 140 with California.

== Major intersections ==
County	Location	mi	km	Destinations	Notes
Washoe				SR 299	
Washoe	Vya			SR 34	Western end of SR 34 concurrency
Washoe				SR 34	Eastern end of SR 34 concurrency
Humboldt				SR 34A	Eastern terminus of SR 34A
Humboldt				SR 140	
1.000 mi = 1.609 km; 1.000 km = 0.621 mi: Concurrency terminus
