= Rebel Creek, Nevada =

Unincorporated community in Nevada, US

Coordinates: 41°36′20″N 117°45′55″W

Rebel Creek is an unincorporated community in Humboldt County, in the U.S. state of Nevada.

The community is located along the east side of the Quinn River Valley just east of US Route 95 and approximately four miles north-northeast of Orovada.

== History ==
A post office was established at Rebel Creek in 1902, and remained in operation until 1947. The community takes its name from nearby Rebel Creek.
