= Great Basin College =

Public college in Elko, Nevada, US

Coordinates: 40.842619°N 115.767156°W

- Former names: Elko College; Northern Nevada College
- Motto: The Gold Standard in the Silver State
- Type: Public college
- Established: 1967; 59 years ago
- Parent institution: Nevada System of Higher Education
- Academic affiliations: Space-grant
- Endowment: $899k
- President: Amber Donnelli
- Students: 3,836
- Location: Elko, Nevada, United States
- Colors: Green and gold
- Mascot: Bighorn Sheep
- Website: gbcnv.edu

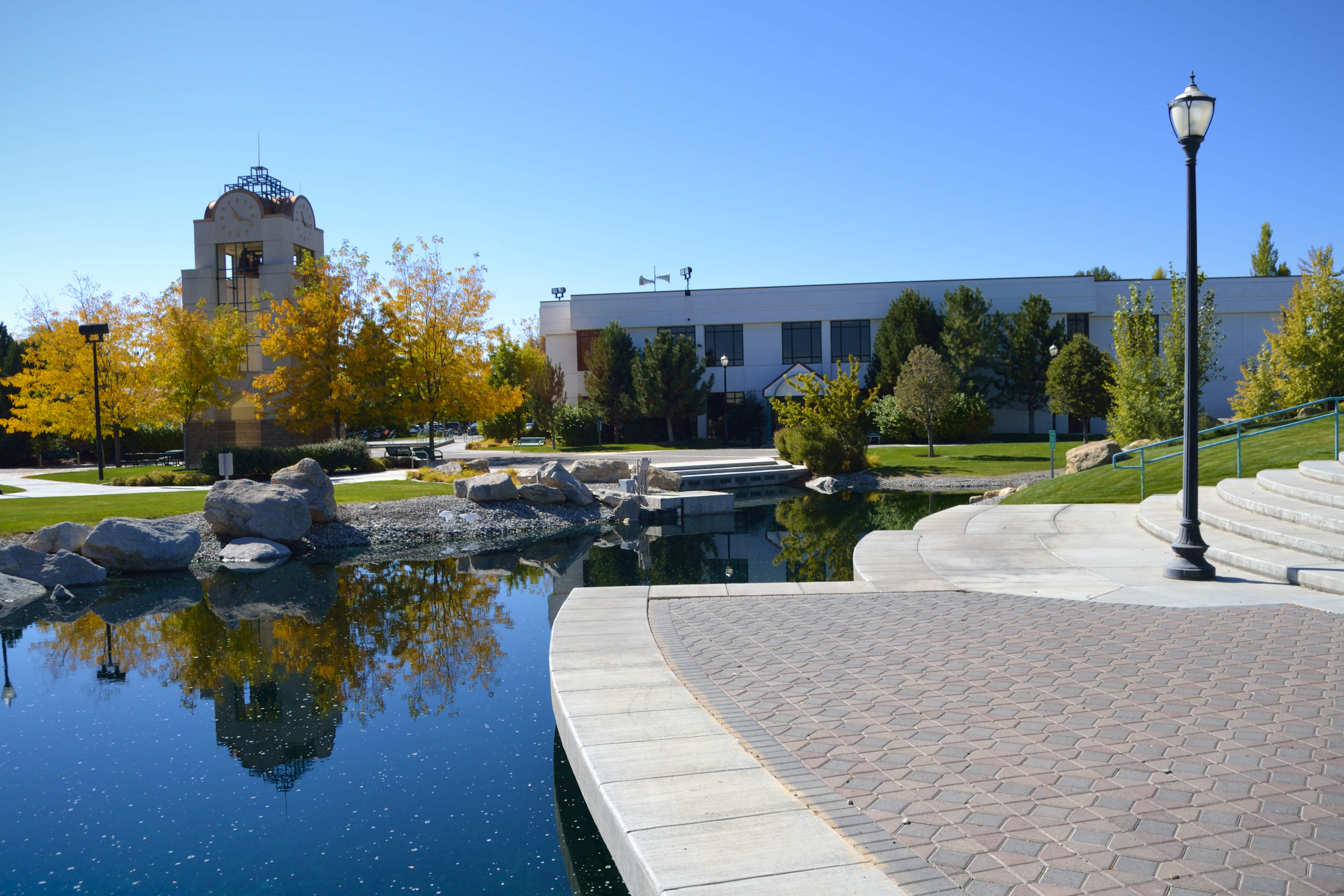
Main campus, Elko

Great Basin College is a public college in Elko, Nevada, United States. Opened in 1967 as Elko College, it was later renamed to Northern Nevada College and then to its current name. It has 3,836 students and is a member of the Nevada System of Higher Education.

== History ==
After its opening in 1967, the college joined the University of Nevada system in August 1969. Formerly, hopes for a college in Elko were fading in the spring of 1968 until a $250,000 donation was received from reclusive Las Vegas billionaire Howard Hughes. The gift was announced by Nevada Governor Paul Laxalt, who was heading the list of dignitaries, at an emotionally charged assembly of supporters at the Commercial Hotel.

== Academics ==
The college offers baccalaureate and associate level instruction in career and technical education and academic areas. It offers bachelor's degrees, Associate of Applied Science degrees, certificates, and short-term training programs. It also offers dual-credit enrollment programs for high school students in its areas of outreach in the cities of Elko, Ely, Winnemucca, and the town of Pahrump.

Undergraduate demographics as of Fall 2023
| Race and ethnicity | Total |
|---|---|
| White | 58% |
| Hispanic | 25% |
| Black | 4% |
| American Indian/Alaska Native | 3% |
| Two or more races | 3% |
| Unknown | 3% |
| Asian | 2% |
| Native Hawaiian/Pacific Islander | 1% |
Economic diversity
| Low-income (Note: The percentage of students who received an income-based federal Pell grant intended for low-income students.) | 33% |
| Affluent (Note: The percentage of students who are a part of the American middle class at the bare minimum.) | 67% |

== Service area ==
The service area includes the counties of Elko, Esmeralda, Eureka, Humboldt, Lander, Lincoln, Lyon, Mineral, Nye, Pershing, and White Pine.

== Campuses ==
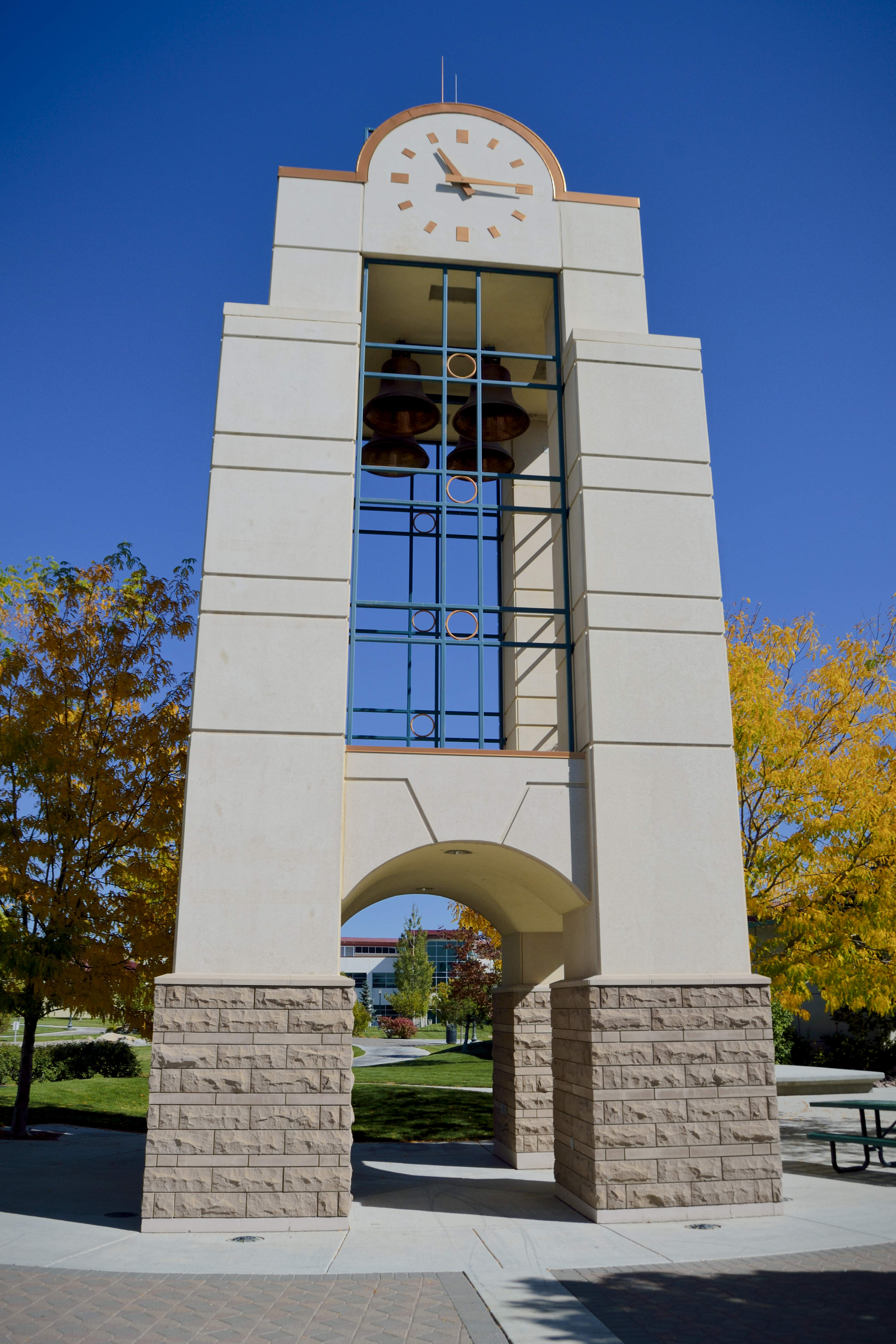
Clock tower at the Main Campus

Great Basin College has its main campus in Elko, in northeastern Nevada. Great Basin College covers 86,500 square miles, two time zones, and ten of Nevada's largest counties.

Residence halls are available at the Elko campus. Branch campuses also serve the communities of Battle Mountain, Ely, Pahrump, and Winnemucca. Satellite centers are located in nearly 20 communities across rural Nevada.
