= Pueblo Mountains =

Mountain range in Oregon and Nevada, US

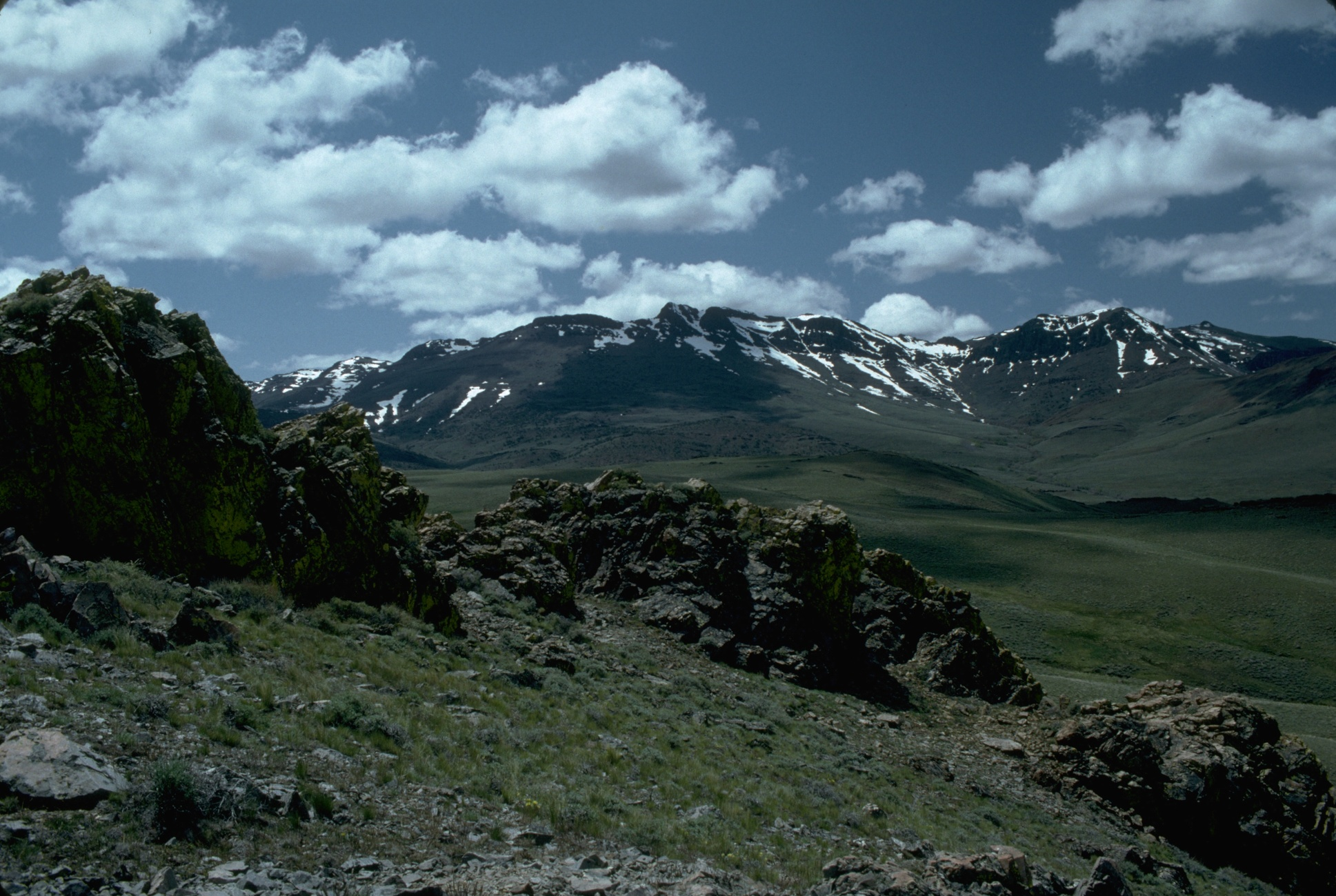
- Pueblo Mountains south of Fields, Oregon

Highest point
- Peak: Pueblo Mountain
- Elevation: 8,632 ft (2,631 m)
- Coordinates: 42°06′00″N 118°38′55″W

Dimensions
- Length: 30 mi (48 km) north–south
- Width: 22 mi (35 km) west–east
- Area: 356 mi^{2} (920 km^{2})including surrounding non-mountainous areas

Geography
- Country: United States
- States: Oregon and Nevada
- Counties: Harney County, Oregon; Humboldt County, Nevada

Geology
- Rock ages: Triassic and Cretaceous
- Rock types: Uplifted sedimentary and volcanic

The Pueblo Mountains are a remote mountain range in the United States located mostly in southeastern Oregon and partially in northwestern Nevada. The highest point in the range is Pueblo Mountain. The dominant vegetation throughout is grasses and big sagebrush; however, there are meadows with cottonwood, aspen, and willow groves along some stream drainages. Most of the range is public land administered by the Bureau of Land Management. There is very little human development in the Pueblo Mountains, and most visitors come for backpacking cross-country, camping, and hunting.

== Geology ==
The Pueblo Mountains in Harney County, Oregon, and Humboldt County, Nevada, are part of the Basin and Range Province of the Western United States, which is characterized by a series of parallel fault blocks forming long north–south-oriented mountain ranges separated by wide, high-desert valleys. The Steens-Pueblo block fault represents the northernmost extension of these structures. The Pueblo fault is not as massive as Steens Mountain; however, it is tilted at a 45-degree angle, a much greater angle than the Steens fault. This accounts for the relatively high elevation of the range's main ridgeline, which averages 7,300 feet (2,200 m) above sea level along its crest.

The mountains are composed of the same basalt that blankets much of southeastern Oregon. Much older metamorphic rocks lie under the more recent basalt flows. These older rocks are exposed along the range's east-facing escarpment and may be related to some of the Triassic formations of the Blue Mountains to the north. These strata have diorite and granodiorite intrusions, probably formed in the Cretaceous Period. The southern part of the Pueblo Mountains has metamorphic rocks rich in quartz impregnated with gold, silver, and copper.

== Topography ==
The Pueblo Mountains cover an area of 356 square miles (920 km^{2}) (including surrounding low-lying terrain), running 30 miles (48 km) north to south and 22 miles (35 km) east to west. The highest peak in the range is Pueblo Mountain, which is 8,632 feet (2,631 m) above sea level at its summit. It is located in Oregon, 8 miles (13 km) north of the Nevada state line. Just west of Pueblo Mountain is West Pueblo Ridge. The ridge is a westward-tilted escarpment that runs the length of the Pueblo Mountains. At 8,420 feet (2,570 m), the peak of West Pueblo Ridge is the second highest point in the range.

The landscape is characterized by rugged ridges with steep escarpments deeply cut by seasonal drainages. The ridges are separated by high-desert basins. There are meadows around spring areas. Machine Meadow and 10 Cent Meadow are two of the largest meadows. The Pueblo Mountains have only a few streams that flow year-round. These include Van Horn Creek and Denio Creek.

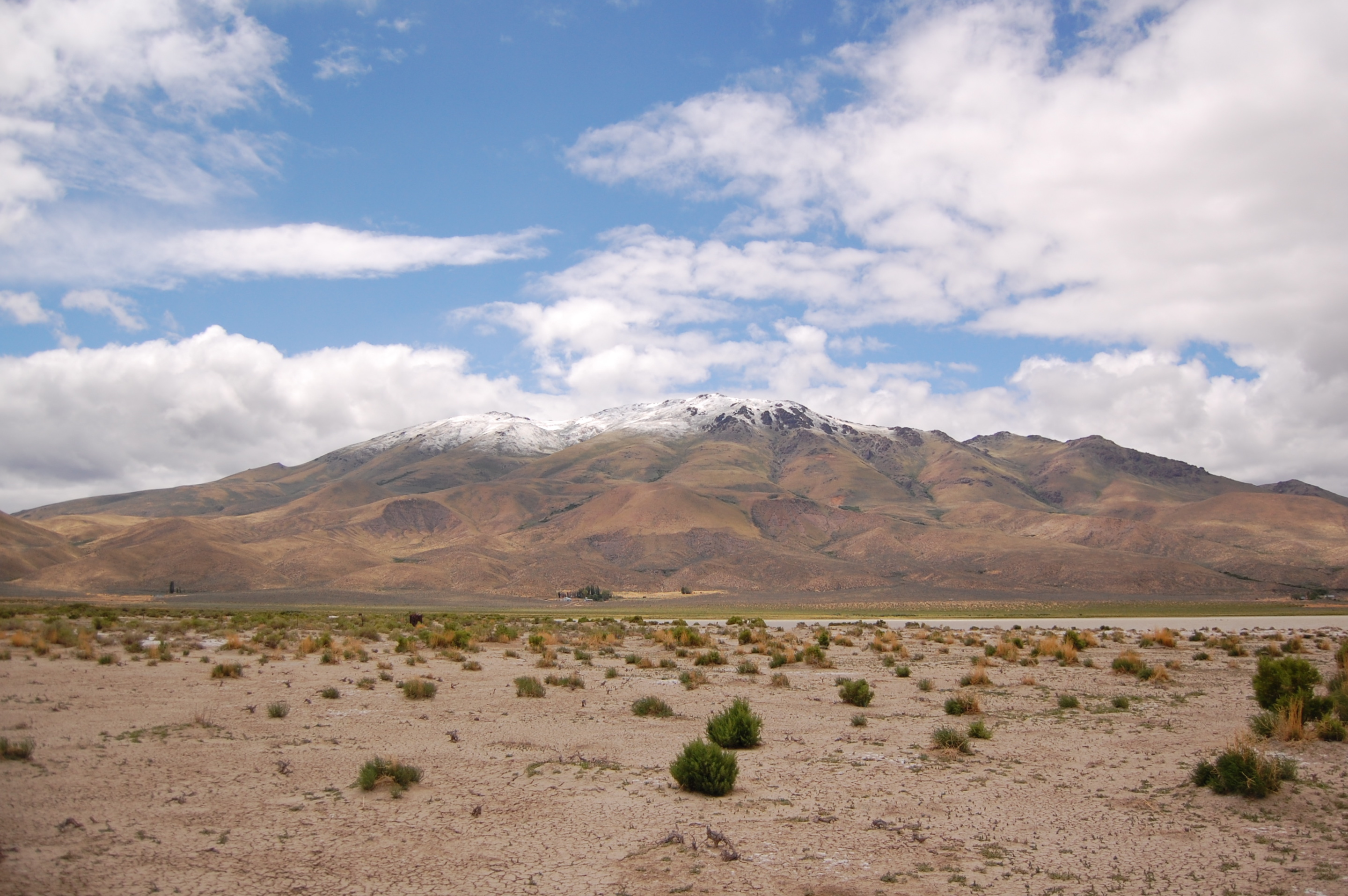
Pueblo Mountain, from the vicinity of Tumtum Lake, southwest of Fields

== Ecology ==
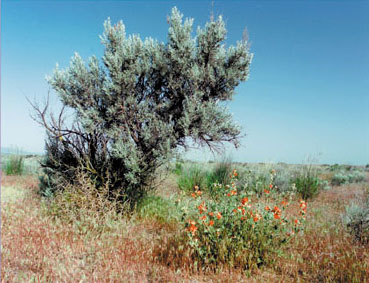
Sagebrush and grasses are the dominant vegetation.

The vegetation in the Pueblo Mountains is dominated by big sagebrush and desert grasses. Common grass species include Idaho fescue, bluebunch wheatgrass, cheatgrass, Thurber's needlegrass, mountain brome, Sandberg's bluegrass, and bottlebrush squirreltail. There are high mountain meadows around springs and narrow riparian greenways that follow the year-round streams. Some greenway areas have cottonwood, aspen, and willow groves. Meadow and high-desert wildflowers found in the Pueblo Mountains include larkspur, Indian paintbrush, cinquefoil, shooting star, columbines, monkey flower, asters, buttercups, low pussytoe, lupin, arrowleaf balsamroot, penstemon, agoseris, draba, mariposa lily, sego lilies, evening primrose, and iris.

The wildlife in the Pueblo Mountains is adapted to the high-desert environment. Pronghorn are common in the open, sagebrush-covered basins, while mule deer like the cottonwood and willow groves. The Oregon Department of Fish and Wildlife released bighorn sheep in the Pueblo Mountains in 1976, 1980, and 1983. Today, they can be found on the steep slopes and high rim rocks. Jackrabbits, antelope ground squirrels, bushy-tailed woodrats, and coyotes are common throughout the range, as are small-footed myotis bats. Beavers can be found in 10 Cent Meadow and several mountain streams as well as riparian areas in the Van Horn Basin. Bird species native to the Pueblo Mountains include the sage grouse, canyon wren, rock wren, valley quail, and chukar. There are also larger birds like golden eagles, red-tailed hawks, turkey vultures, and ravens that ride the thermals above the mountains. There are also rare Whitehorse Basin cutthroat trout in both Van Horn Creek and Denio Creek.

== Human uses ==
Most land in the Pueblo Mountains is managed by the federal Bureau of Land Management. The entire mountain range is quite remote; as a result, there are few visitors. Hiking, camping, hunting, horseback riding, wildlife viewing, and photography are the most popular activities. There are also grazing allotments and mining claims in the mountains. The Pueblo Mountains are currently being evaluated for possible wind power sites.

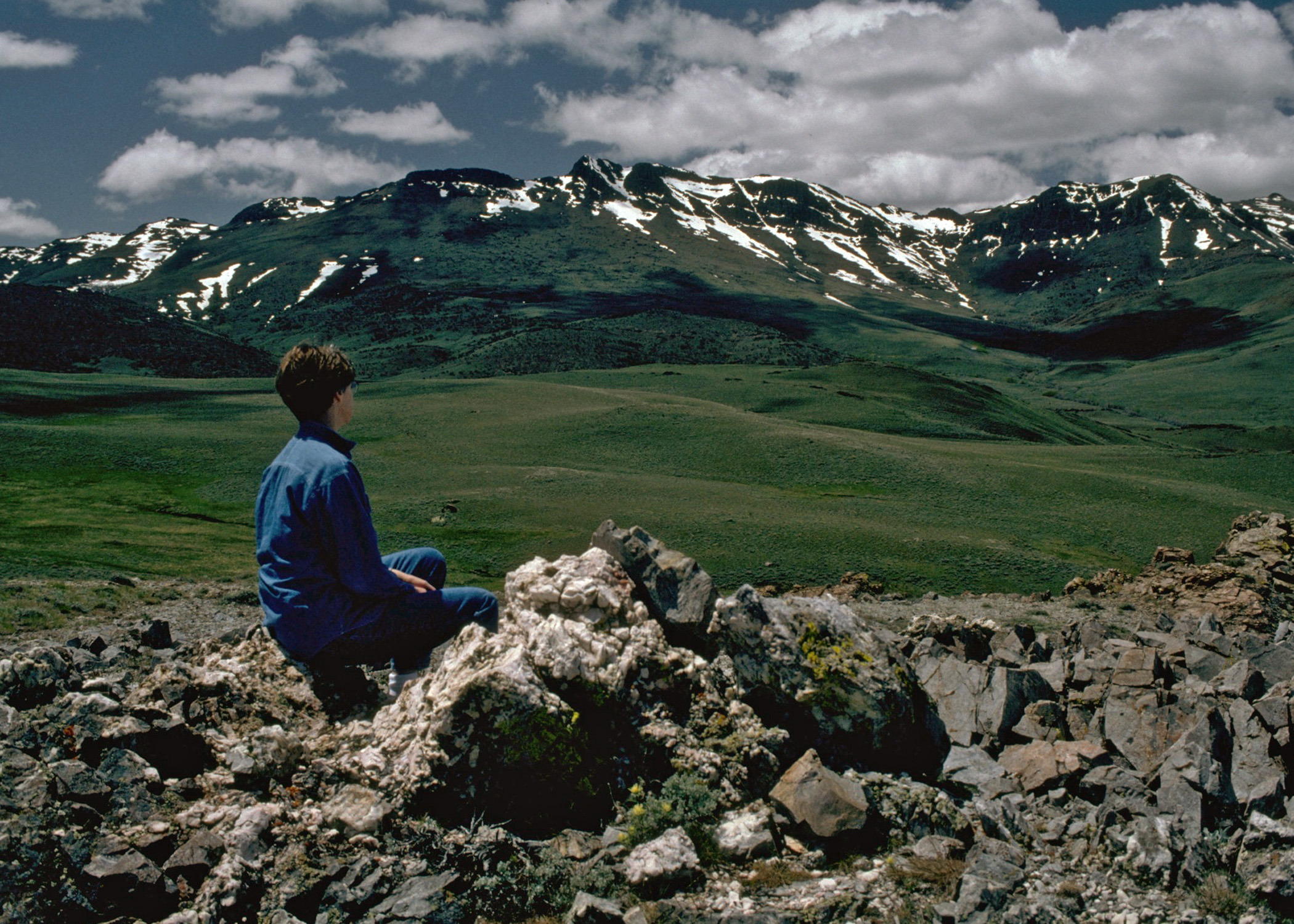
Sightseeing in the high country of the Pueblo range

While there is no designated wilderness area in the Pueblo Mountains, traveling in the mountains can be very challenging. The High Desert Trail runs through the mountains; however, it is not a developed hiking trail. The route is simply marked by rock cairns that serve as guideposts, allowing hikers to trek cross-country over the high-desert terrain from one marker to the next. The cairns were built as a cooperative venture between the Bureau of Land Management, the Oregon Parks and Recreation Department, and the Desert Trail Association (a private organization). The Desert Trail Association publishes a topographic map for hikers that gives directions for orienteering from cairn to cairn.

Cattle and sheep grazing in the Pueblo Mountains began when the first ranches were established along the eastern edge of the mountains in the mid-1860s. Today, the Bureau of Land Management oversees grazing allotments in the area. Cattle can be found grazing in some mountain meadows and on open rangeland during the spring and summer.

Miners were among the first Europeans to explore the Pueblo Mountains. There are at least 18 locations where mining took place in the past. However, commercial mining has never been successful in the area. Today, there are still valid mining claims in some parts of the Pueblo Mountains along with a few abandoned miners' cabins.

Wind power is now being explored in the Pueblo Mountains. In 2006, the Bureau of Land Management approved a wind energy test at a 468-acre (1.89 km^{2}) site in the Pueblo Mountains. The test allowed a private wind energy company to install, operate, and maintain two meteorological poles. The test equipment on the poles monitors weather conditions in the area to determine if winds would be strong and steady enough for commercial development. In 2009, the Bureau of Land Management renewed the test permit for an additional three years.
