= Rebel Creek (Nevada) =

Stream in Nevada, U.S.

Coordinates: 41°37′28″N 117°49′58″W

Rebel Creek is a stream in the U.S. state of Nevada.

According to tradition, Rebel Creek was named by a Southern sympathizer who won naming rights in a fight against a Northern foe.
