= Humboldt County, Nevada =

County in Nevada, United States

- County
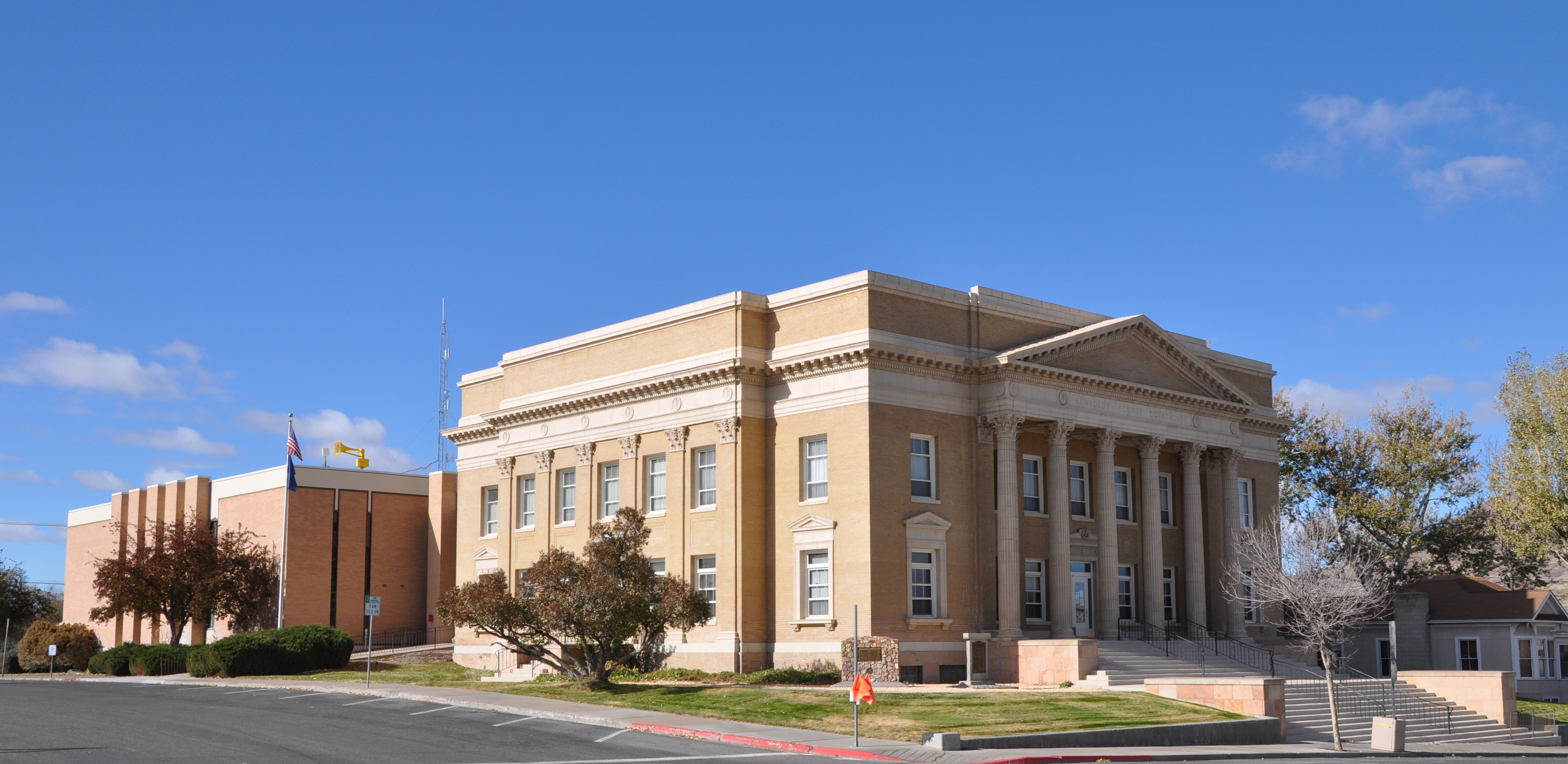
- Humboldt County Courthouse in Winnemucca

- Flag Seal

- Location within the U.S. state of Nevada
- Coordinates: 41°25′N 118°07′W
- Country: United States
- State: Nevada
- Founded: 1856; 170 years ago
- Named for: Humboldt River
- Seat: Winnemucca
- Largest city: Winnemucca

Area
  - Total: 9,658 sq mi (25,010 km^{2})
  - Land: 9,641 sq mi (24,970 km^{2})
  - Water: 17 sq mi (44 km^{2}) 0.2%

Population (2020)
  - Total: 17,285
  - Estimate (2025): 17,267 ▼
  - Density: 1.793/sq mi (0.6922/km^{2})
- Time zone: UTC−8 (Pacific)
  - Summer (DST): UTC−7 (PDT)
- Congressional district: 2nd
- Website: hcnv.us

Humboldt County is a county in the U.S. state of Nevada. As of the 2020 Census, the population was 17,285. It is a largely rural county that is sparsely populated with the only major city being Winnemucca, the county seat, which has a population of 8,431. Humboldt County comprises the Winnemucca, NV Micropolitan Statistical Area and serves as an important crossroads in the national transportation network. Interstate 80 travels through the southeastern corner of the county, meeting US 95 in Winnemucca that serves as a primary freight corridor between Northern Nevada and Boise, Idaho and the Interstate 84 freight corridor that links much of the Pacific Northwest. The original transcontinental railway, constructed by the Central Pacific Railroad, reached Humboldt County on September 16, 1868. The Western Pacific Railroad would reach Humboldt County by November 1909, providing two mainline rail links to California and the Eastern United States. Both railroads have since been acquired by the Union Pacific Railroad, who continues to serve the region today.

The county contains several areas of land belonging to regionally significant Native American communities including the Fort McDermitt Paiute and Shoshone Tribe and the Winnemucca Indian Colony of Nevada.

Largely a region with ranchers and farmers, the county came under increased attention after the 2017 proposal of the Thacker Pass Lithium Mine. The mine has been controversial locally and in the national press—as it would be the first major lithium clay mine to open in the United States and be important to the local economy but threatens local ecosystems and indigenous heritage sites.

== History ==
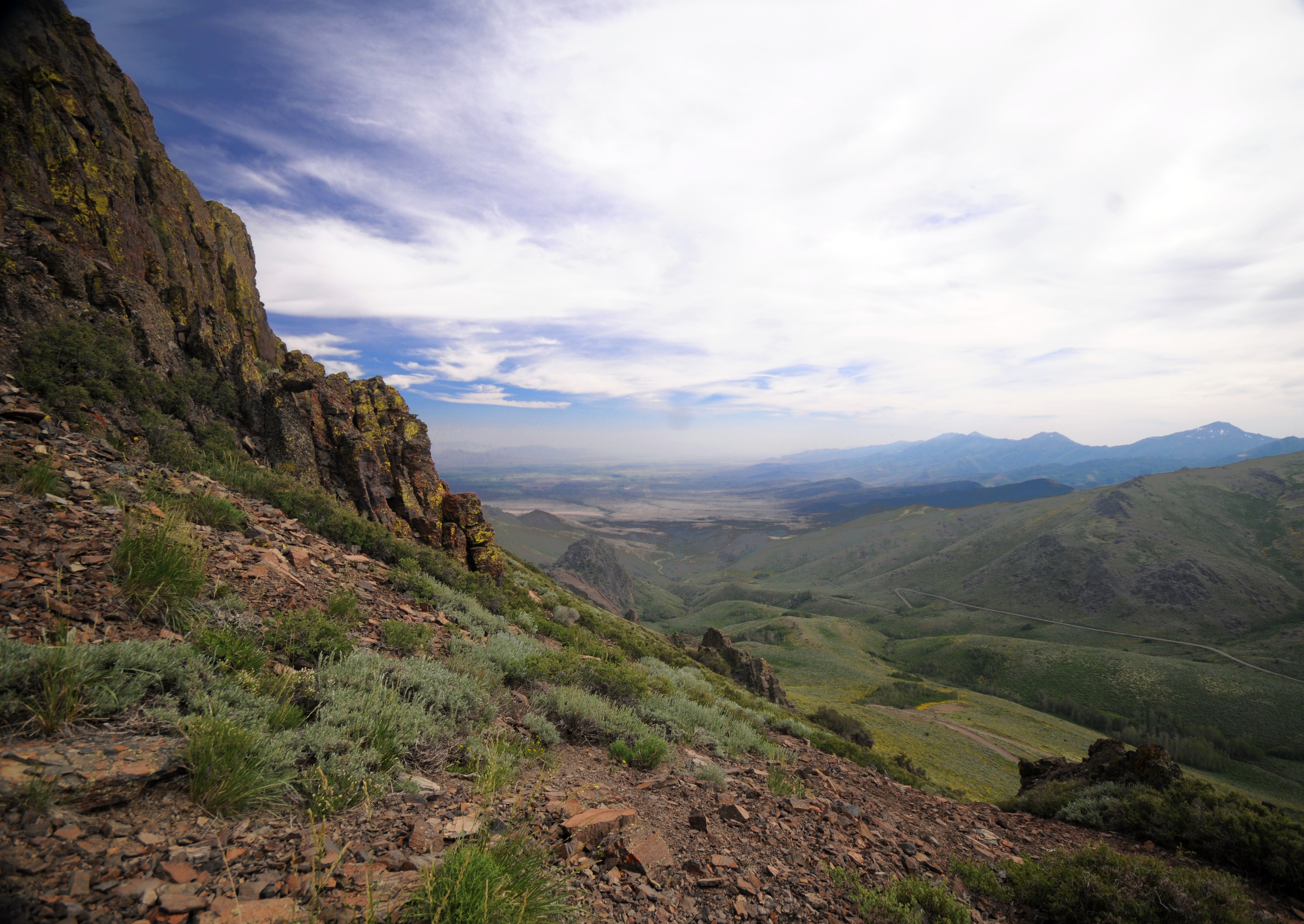
Santa Rosa Range, Humboldt National Forest

The Fort McDermitt Paiute and Shoshone tribes have lived in Humboldt County for over 12,000 years.

Humboldt County is the oldest county in Nevada, created by the Utah Territorial Legislature in 1856. It was also one of Nevada's original nine counties created in 1861. The county is named after the Humboldt River, which was named by John C. Frémont after Alexander von Humboldt, a German naturalist, traveler and statesman. Humboldt never saw the places that bear his name. Unionville was the first county seat in 1861 until the mining boom died there and it was moved to Winnemucca on the transcontinental railroad line in 1873.

The county was the site of an arrest in 2000 that led to the U.S. Supreme Court decision Hiibel v. Sixth Judicial District Court of Nevada in 2004.

Humboldt County is referenced in Brandon Flowers' 2015 song "Digging Up The Heart", in which the protagonist meets "Christie, queen of Humboldt County".

== Geography ==
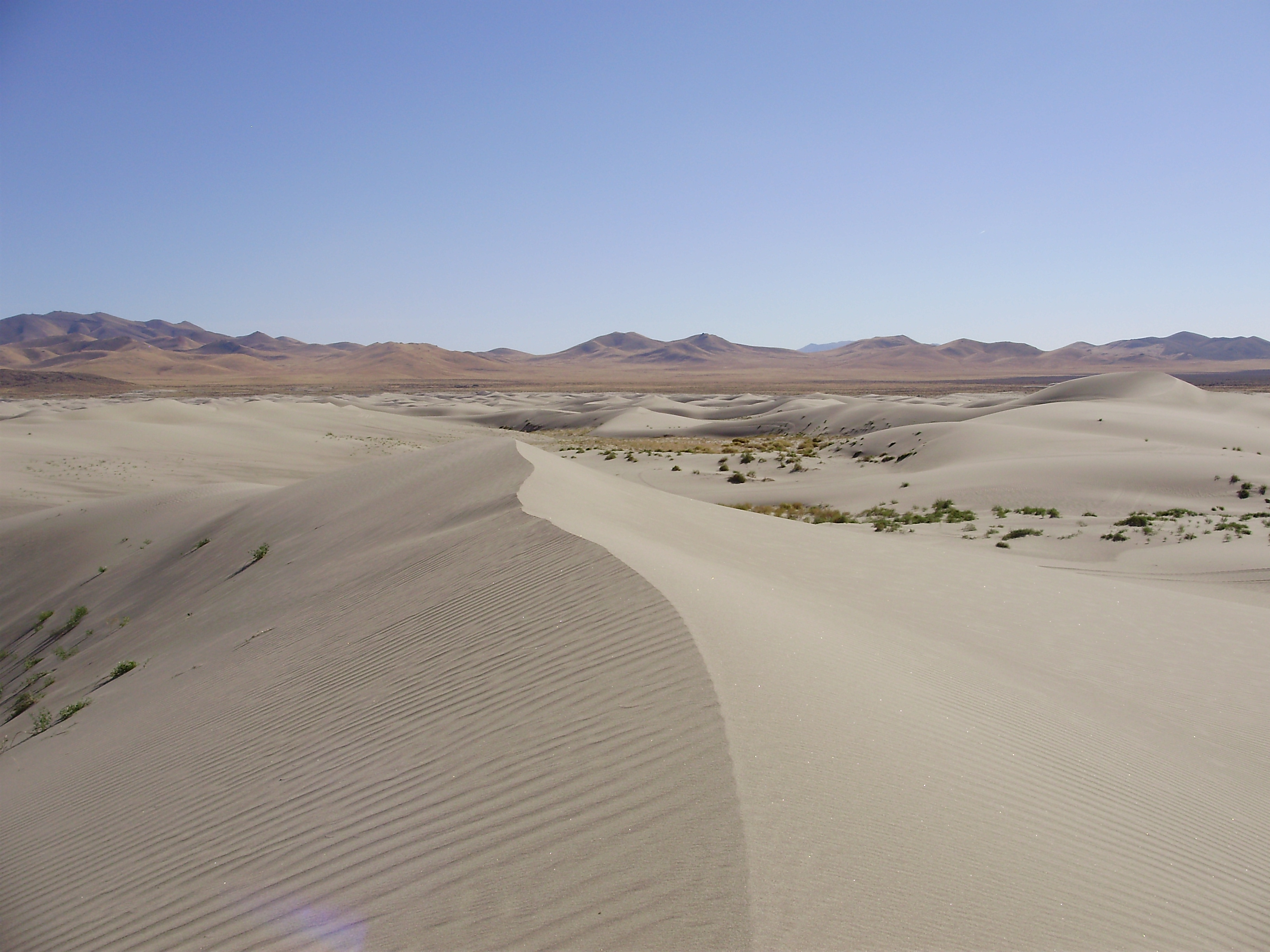
The Winnemucca Sand Dunes, north of Winnemucca

According to the U.S. Census Bureau, the county has an area of 9,658 square miles (25,010 km^{2}), of which 9,641 square miles (24,970 km^{2}) is land and 17 square miles (44 km^{2}) (0.2%) is water. It is Nevada's fourth-largest county by area.

The Santa Rosa Range runs through eastern Humboldt County. The highest point in the county, 9,731 ft (2,966 m) Granite Peak, is in the range. The most topographically prominent mountain in Humboldt County is unofficially known as Dan Dobbins Peak and is in the remote Jackson Mountains.

=== Adjacent counties ===
- Harney County, Oregon - northwest
- Malheur County, Oregon - north
- Owyhee County, Idaho - northeast/Mountain Time Border
- Elko County - east
- Lander County - southeast
- Pershing County - south
- Washoe County - west

=== National protected areas ===
- Black Rock Desert-High Rock Canyon Emigrant Trails National Conservation Area (part)
- Humboldt National Forest (part)
- Sheldon National Wildlife Refuge (part)

=== Reservations ===
The county includes land that is held by Indian reservations.

==== Fort McDermitt Paiute and Shoshone Tribe ====
Location of Fort McDermitt Indian Reservation

The Fort McDermitt Indian Reservation spans the distance of the Nevada–Oregon border, in Humboldt County, Nevada and Malheur County, Oregon, near the Quinn River, which runs east to west through the Tribe's Nevada lands. Just to the east is southwestern Idaho. The Fort McDermitt Military Reservation was established 14 August 1865 at the former site of Quinn River Camp No. 33 and a stagecoach stop, Quinn River Station, in what was a traditional seasonal homeland of the Paiute, Shoshone and Bannock peoples.

The reservation was established with 16,354 acres (66.2 km^{2}) in Nevada and 19,000 acres (76.9 km^{2}) in Oregon, mostly areas of arid land. In October 2016 the federal government put into trust for the tribe approximately 19,094 acres (77.3 km^{2}) acres of Bureau of Land Management (BLM) land in Nevada, in order to expand their reservation and give them a more sustainable base. Gaming is prohibited on these new lands. This was done under the Nevada Native Nations Land Act (PL No: 114-232).

==== Winnemucca Indian Colony of Nevada ====
The Winnemucca Indian Colony of Nevada has a reservation at in Humboldt County, Nevada. The reservation was established on June 18, 1917, and comprises two parcels of land, 20 acres (0.081 km^{2}) enclosed within the urban area of the City of Winnemucca centered on Cinnabar Street, and 320 acres (1.3 km^{2}) of rural land on the southern edge of the city west of Water Canyon Road. In 1990, 17 tribal members lived on the reservation. In 2022, a court filing reported that the colony consisted of 28 tribal members.

== Demographics ==
Historical population
Census	Pop.	Note	%±
1860	40		—
1870	1,916		4,690.0%
1880	3,480		81.6%
1890	3,434		−1.3%
1900	4,463		30.0%
1910	6,825		52.9%
1920	3,743		−45.2%
1930	3,795		1.4%
1940	4,743		25.0%
1950	4,838		2.0%
1960	5,708		18.0%
1970	6,375		11.7%
1980	9,434		48.0%
1990	12,844		36.1%
2000	16,106		25.4%
2010	16,528		2.6%
2020	17,285		4.6%
2025 (est.)	17,267	▼	−0.1%
U.S. Decennial Census; 1790-1960 1900-1990; 1990-2000 2010-2020

=== Racial and ethnic composition ===
Humboldt County, Nevada – Racial and ethnic composition Note: the US Census treats Hispanic/Latino as an ethnic category. This table excludes Latinos from the racial categories and assigns them to a separate category. Hispanics/Latinos may be of any race.
Race / Ethnicity (NH = Non-Hispanic)	Pop 1980	Pop 1990	Pop 2000	Pop 2010	Pop 2020	% 1980	% 1990	% 2000	% 2010	% 2020
White alone (NH)	7,302	9,721	11,985	11,395	11,032	77.40%	75.69%	74.41%	68.94%	63.82%
Black or African American alone (NH)	36	70	78	78	137	0.38%	0.55%	0.48%	0.47%	0.79%
Native American or Alaska Native alone (NH)	660	656	598	628	571	7.00%	5.11%	3.71%	3.80%	3.30%
Asian alone (NH)	23	53	88	108	152	0.24%	0.41%	0.55%	0.65%	0.88%
Native Hawaiian or Pacific Islander alone (NH)	x	x	11	18	26	x	x	0.07%	0.11%	0.15%
Other race alone (NH)	51	9	14	12	199	0.54%	0.07%	0.09%	0.07%	1.15%
Mixed race or Multiracial (NH)	x	x	292	251	657	x	x	1.81%	1.52%	3.80%
Hispanic or Latino (any race)	1,362	2,335	3,040	4,038	4,511	14.44%	18.18%	18.87%	24.43%	26.10%
Total	9,434	12,844	16,106	16,528	17,285	100.00%	100.00%	100.00%	100.00%	100.00%

=== 2020 census ===
As of the 2020 census, the county had a population of 17,285. The median age was 36.7 years, 26.2% of residents were under the age of 18, and 14.6% were 65 years of age or older. For every 100 females there were 106.8 males, and for every 100 females age 18 and over there were 107.2 males age 18 and over.

61.0% of residents lived in urban areas, while 39.0% lived in rural areas.

The racial makeup of the county was 69.8% White, 0.9% Black or African American, 4.0% American Indian and Alaska Native, 0.9% Asian, 0.2% Native Hawaiian and Pacific Islander, 12.5% from some other race, and 11.7% from two or more races. Hispanic or Latino residents of any race comprised 26.1% of the population.

There were 6,575 households in the county, of which 35.1% had children under the age of 18 living with them and 19.4% had a female householder with no spouse or partner present. About 26.0% of all households were made up of individuals and 10.7% had someone living alone who was 65 years of age or older.

There were 7,658 housing units, of which 14.1% were vacant. Among occupied housing units, 69.8% were owner-occupied and 30.2% were renter-occupied. The homeowner vacancy rate was 1.2% and the rental vacancy rate was 9.2%.

=== 2010 census ===
At the 2010 census, there were 16,528 people, 6,289 households, and 4,316 families in the county. The population density was 1.7 inhabitants per square mile (0.66/km^{2}). There were 7,123 housing units at an average density of 0.7 units per square mile (0.27 units/km^{2}). The racial makeup of the county was 79.0% white, 4.2% American Indian, 0.7% Asian, 0.5% black or African American, 0.1% Pacific islander, 12.7% from other races, and 2.8% from two or more races. Those of Hispanic or Latino origin made up 24.4% of the population. In terms of ancestry, 15.0% were English, 14.6% were Irish, 14.1% were German, and 5.1% were American.

Of the 6,289 households, 36.3% had children under the age of 18 living with them, 53.2% were married couples living together, 8.9% had a female householder with no husband present, 31.4% were non-families, and 25.6% of households were made up of individuals. The average household size was 2.60 and the average family size was 3.13. The median age was 36.2 years.

The median household income was $55,656 and the median family income was $69,032. Males had a median income of $56,843 versus $33,531 for females. The per capita income for the county was $25,965. About 7.8% of families and 12.0% of the population were below the poverty line, including 17.3% of those under age 18 and 4.6% of those age 65 or over.

=== 2000 census ===
At the 2000 census there were 16,106 people in the county, organized into 5733 households, and 4133 families. The population density was 2 people per square mile (0.77 people/km^{2}). There were 6,954 housing units at an average density of 1 units per square mile (0.39/km^{2}). The racial makeup of the county was 83.21% White, 4.02% Native American, 0.57% Asian, 0.51% Black or African American, 0.07% Pacific Islander, 8.54% from other races, and 3.09% from two or more races. 18.87%. were Hispanic or Latino of any race.

There were 5,733 households, 40.9% had children under the age of 18 living with them, 59.6% were married couples living together, 7.6% had a female householder with no husband present, and 27.9% were non-families. 22.8% of households were made up of individuals, and 6.3% had someone living alone who was 65 or older. The average household size was 2.77 and the average family size was 3.28.

The age distribution was 31.40% under the age of 18, 7.50% from 18 to 24, 31.20% from 25 to 44, 22.30% from 45 to 64, and 7.50% who were 65 or older. The median age was 33 years. For every 100 females, there were 110.30 males. For every 100 females age 18 and over, there were 110.20 males.

The median household income was $47,147 and the median family income was $52,156. Males had a median income of $44,694 versus $25,917 for females. The per capita income for the county was $19,539. 9.70% of the population and 7.70% of families were below the poverty line. Out of the total population, 10.40% of those under the age of 18 and 10.80% of those 65 and older were living below the poverty line.

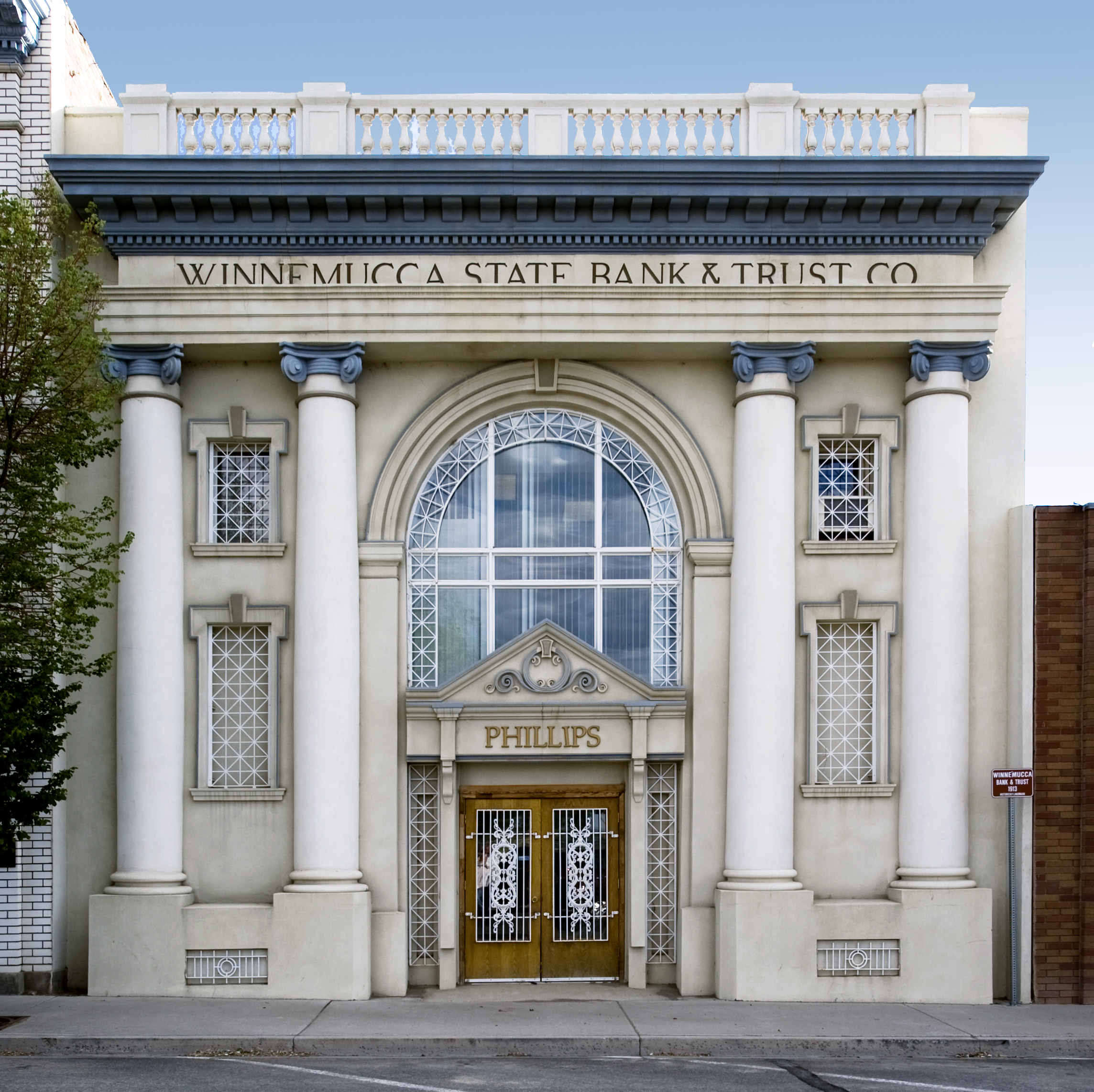
Winnemucca State Bank and Trust building is on the National Register of Historic Places.

== Education ==
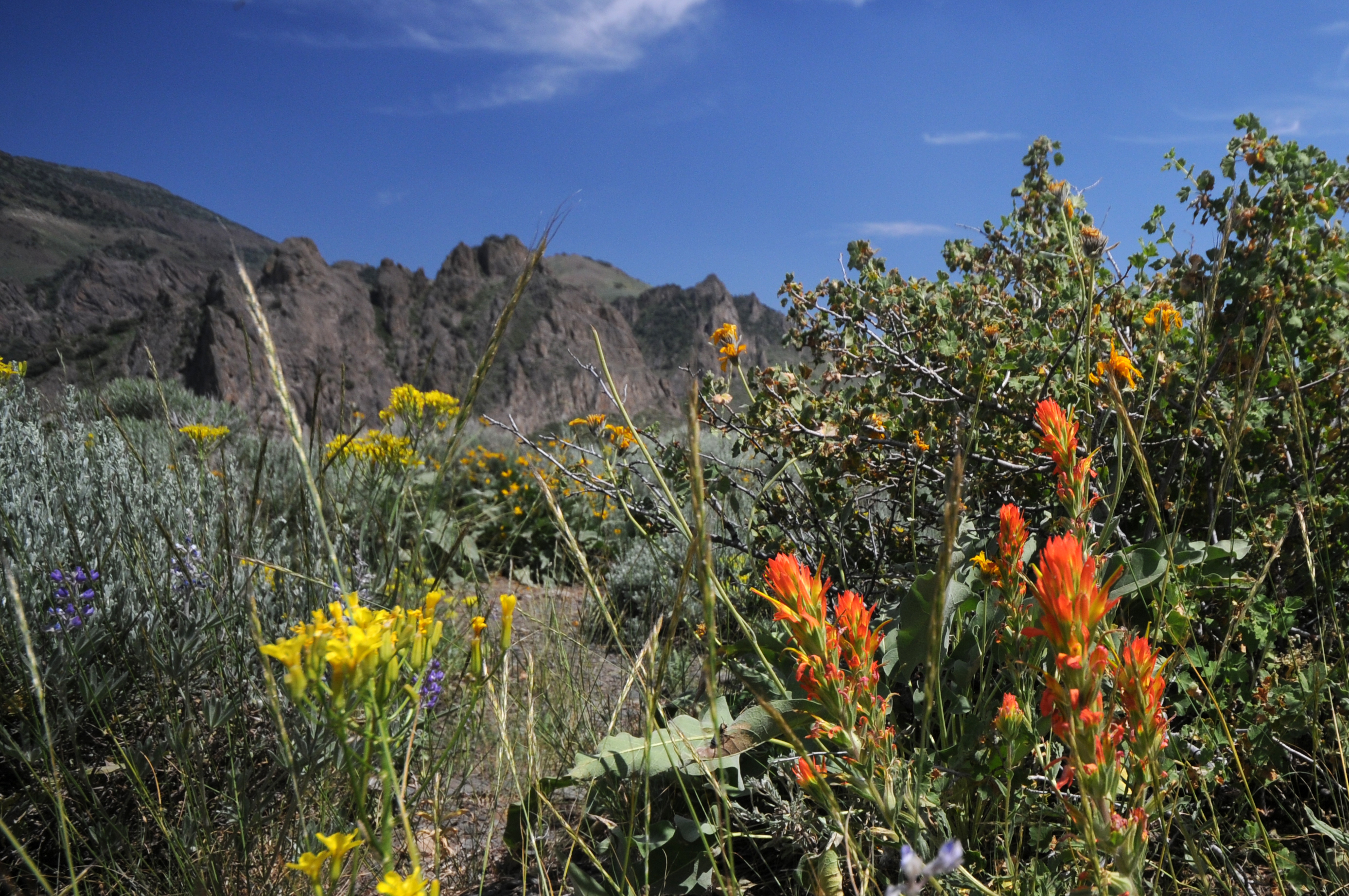
Wildflowers in Paradise Valley, 2008

Humboldt County School District serves all of Humboldt County. Albert M. Lowry High School and McDermitt Combined School have high school programs.

The county is in the service area of Great Basin College.

Previously Crane Union High School, a boarding high school in Oregon, served portions of the county, and it continues to be an option for residents living in Denio.

There was formerly a private school in the county, the Leonard Creek School, that was in operation in 1978.

The Humboldt County Library has its main facility in Winnemucca, and branches in Denio and McDermitt.

== Law enforcement ==
There have been at least two allegations of abuse of civil forfeiture by Humboldt County Sheriff's deputy Lee Dove, who as of 2015, is no longer employed as a deputy. Both cases were settled in favor of the civilians in question.

== Politics ==
Humboldt County, like most of rural Nevada, is overwhelmingly Republican, with Donald Trump receiving over three-quarters of the vote in both 2020 and 2024. The Fort McDermitt Indian Reservation, which lies on the county's northern border, is the only Democratic-leaning area of the county.

United States presidential election results for Humboldt County, Nevada
Year	Republican		Democratic		Third party(ies)	
Year	No.	%	No.	%	No.	%
1904	610	57.44%	356	33.52%	96	9.04%
1908	823	40.07%	1,009	49.12%	222	10.81%
1912	207	11.51%	719	39.99%	872	48.50%
1916	1,004	33.47%	1,681	56.03%	315	10.50%
1920	660	51.40%	532	41.43%	92	7.17%
1924	400	35.30%	248	21.89%	485	42.81%
1928	783	56.53%	602	43.47%	0	0.00%
1932	405	26.45%	1,126	73.55%	0	0.00%
1936	390	24.38%	1,210	75.63%	0	0.00%
1940	789	36.60%	1,367	63.40%	0	0.00%
1944	835	45.65%	994	54.35%	0	0.00%
1948	901	49.21%	886	48.39%	44	2.40%
1952	1,398	66.92%	691	33.08%	0	0.00%
1956	1,292	60.60%	840	39.40%	0	0.00%
1960	1,157	49.66%	1,173	50.34%	0	0.00%
1964	1,106	43.77%	1,421	56.23%	0	0.00%
1968	1,287	50.97%	885	35.05%	353	13.98%
1972	1,659	69.94%	713	30.06%	0	0.00%
1976	1,380	53.38%	1,074	41.55%	131	5.07%
1980	1,950	68.59%	684	24.06%	209	7.35%
1984	2,498	72.41%	862	24.99%	90	2.61%
1988	2,378	66.50%	1,024	28.64%	174	4.87%
1992	1,505	42.72%	810	22.99%	1,208	34.29%
1996	2,334	50.85%	1,467	31.96%	789	17.19%
2000	3,638	72.33%	1,128	22.43%	264	5.25%
2004	3,896	72.59%	1,361	25.36%	110	2.05%
2008	3,586	63.31%	1,909	33.70%	169	2.98%
2012	3,810	66.33%	1,737	30.24%	197	3.43%
2016	4,521	70.28%	1,386	21.55%	526	8.18%
2020	5,877	75.63%	1,689	21.73%	205	2.64%
2024	6,141	76.48%	1,711	21.31%	178	2.22%

United States Senate election results for Humboldt County, Nevada1
Year	Republican		Democratic		Third party(ies)	
Year	No.	%	No.	%	No.	%
2024	5,500	69.03%	1,838	23.07%	630	7.91%

== Economy ==
=== Lithium mine ===
The Thacker Pass lithium mine is a lithium clay mining development project in Humboldt County, Nevada, which is the largest known lithium deposit in the US and one of the largest in the world, and is believed by some to have the potential to supply up to 25% of the world's lithium demand. There has been significant exploration of Thacker Pass since 2007. The Bureau of Land Management issued a Record of Decision approving development of the mine in January 2021. Construction began in March 2023 after an emergency appeal was denied by the 9th Circuit Court of Appeals. The project site would cover 18,000 acres (7,300 ha), with less than 6,000 acres (2,400 ha) of that being mined, on a site 21 miles (34 km) west-northwest of Orovada, Nevada within the McDermitt Caldera. The mine is a project of Lithium Nevada, LLC, a wholly owned subsidiary of Lithium Americas Corp. In late January 2023, car giant General Motors announced it would invest $650M in the mine project, giving GM exclusive access to the first phase of production. In February 2023, when the initial $320 million investment was completed, GM became Lithium Americas's largest shareholder and offtake partner. At full capacity the mine would produce 66,000 tons annually, equivalent to 25% of global demand for lithium in 2021, which was expected to triple over the next five years. Development of the mine is driven by increasing demand for lithium used in electric vehicle batteries and grid storage of intermittently generated electricity from sources such as solar power or wind power.

The project has met resistance in the form of legal challenges and direct action. While several Indigenous tribes with traditional homeland in the area support the project some nearby tribes oppose the project. These opposition tribes have stated that Thacker Pass is a sacred site, a massacre site, and that they were not adequately consulted by the Bureau of Land Management. No BLM study or cultural mining study has found evidence of the massacre site within the mining area or even the extended area. Additionally, opponents of the mine have voiced concerns about rushed environmental review, threats to critical wildlife habitat, disruption of cultural sites. Proponents of the mine have stated that the project is necessary to limit climate change by reducing carbon emissions from American cars, is benign in its social and environmental impact, and will create 300 long-term jobs in rural Nevada, paying an average of $63,000 per year. The New York Times reported that controversy around the mine is "emblematic of a fundamental tension" between green energy and damage caused by resource extraction required for those technologies.

== Transportation ==
=== Major highways ===
- Interstate 80
- Interstate 80 Business Loop
- U.S. Route 95
- State Route 140
- State Route 289
- State Route 290
- State Route 292
- State Route 293
- State Route 294
- State Route 789
- State Route 794
- State Route 795
- State Route 796

== Communities ==
=== City ===
- Winnemucca (county seat)

=== Census-designated places ===
- Denio
- Fort McDermitt
- Golconda
- McDermitt
- Orovada
- Paradise Valley
- Valmy

=== Unincorporated communities ===
- Rebel Creek
- Stone House
- Tule

== See also ==
- National Register of Historic Places listings in Humboldt County, Nevada
