= Denio, Nevada =

Unincorporated community in Nevada, US

- Census-designated place
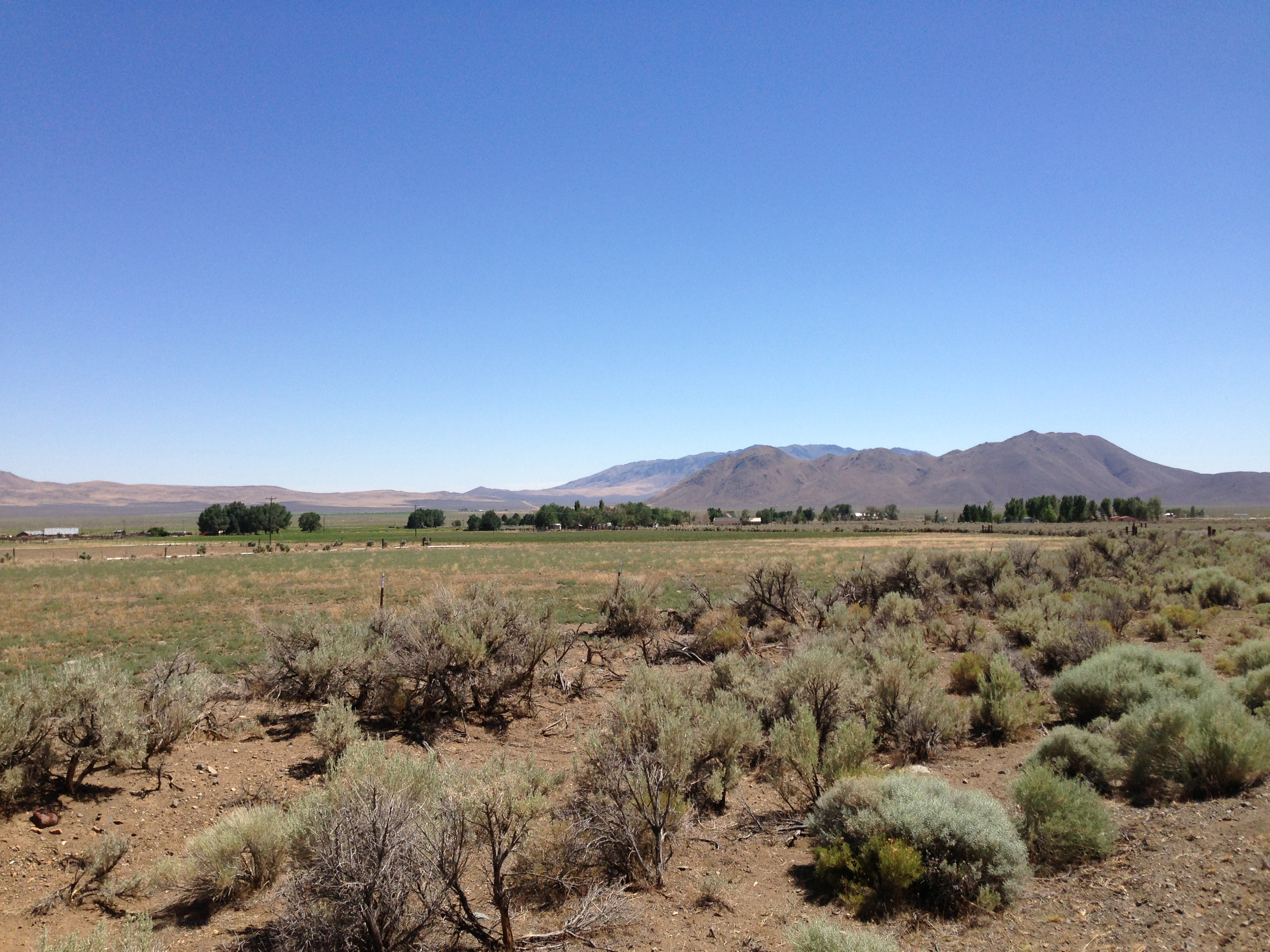

- Location within Nevada Location within the United States
- Coordinates: 41°59′24″N 118°37′59″W
- Country: United States
- States: Nevada (CDP); Oregon (outside CDP)
- Counties: Humboldt (CDP); Harney (outside CDP)

Area
  - Total: 0.46 sq mi (1.19 km^{2})
  - Land: 0.46 sq mi (1.19 km^{2})
  - Water: 0 sq mi (0.00 km^{2})
- Elevation: 4,206 ft (1,282 m)

Population (2020)
  - Total: 34
  - Density: 74.2/sq mi (28.65/km^{2})
- Time zone: UTC-8 (Pacific (PST))
  - Summer (DST): UTC-7 (PDT)
- ZIP code: 89404
- FIPS code: 32-18500
- GNIS feature ID: 845425

Denio is a census-designated place (CDP) in Humboldt County, Nevada, along the Oregon state line in the United States. The Denio post office was originally north of the state line in Harney County, Oregon, but the residents moved the building into Nevada in the mid-20th century. The population of the CDP, which is entirely in Nevada, was 34 at the 2020 census. Additional development considered to be Denio extends into Oregon. The CDP includes a post office, a community center, a library, and the Diamond Inn Bar, the center of the town's social life. Recreational activities in the Denio area include bird watching, photography, off-road vehicle use, fishing, recreational black opal mining, rockhounding, hunting, visiting the hot springs, and camping on the Sheldon National Wildlife Refuge.

Denio Junction is about 3 miles (5 km) south of Denio, at the junction of State Route 140 and State Route 292. Denio Junction's motel provides gasoline, food, groceries, and lodging. Denio Junction Airport is a two-runway graded airstrip. There is no scheduled air or ground transportation serving this field, which is a short walk from Denio Junction.

== History ==
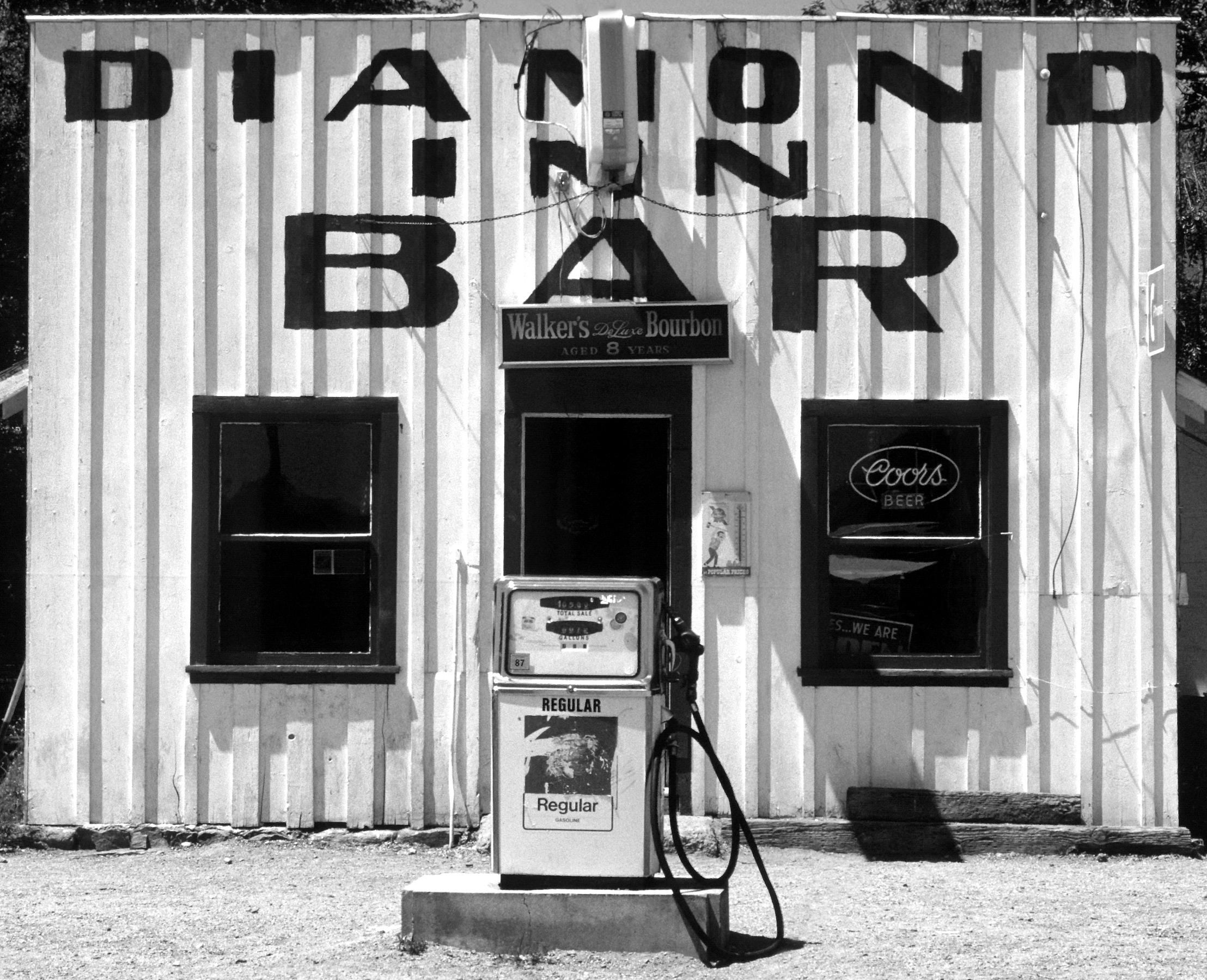
The Diamond Inn in Denio, 1976

Denio was named after Aaron Denio, who settled in the area in 1885. He was born in 1824 in Illinois and traveled to California in 1860. He worked in milling, mining, and farming in Nevada and California for 25 years before settling near the Oregon-Nevada border. He died at Denio in 1907. The Denio post office was established in Oregon in 1888. After World War II a number of businesses relocated south of the state line to take advantage of Nevada's lack of an income tax and more liberal liquor, gambling, and prostitution laws. The post office was moved and reopened in Nevada in 1950 for Nevada addresses, not Oregon.

== Education ==
Public education in Denio (on the Nevada side) is administered by the Humboldt County School District, which operates the Denio School, a three-room kindergarten-eighth grade (K-8) school. It is, more or less, a two-room schoolhouse, and lacks a full-service cafeteria. By design, as per circa 2004, the school functions to allow teachers more informal, flexible scheduling. There were 20 students in the 1963-1964 school year; likewise, enrollment in December 2004 was also 20 students. In 2025 the board of trustees closed the Denio school since it had two students, which the board felt were too few. The board reopened it in 2026 after area families with a total of 11 children expressed that they wanted a school.

As of 2004, Denio, Nevada students of high school age may attend Humboldt County School District's Albert M. Lowry High School (in Winnemucca, Nevada); additionally, parents of high school-aged children who decide to attend Lowry High School may relocate to Winnemucca for the duration of their children’s time as students there. High schoolers may also attend Crane Union High School, a public boarding high school in Crane, Oregon. The Oregon side (across from Denio, Nevada) is, as of 2020, zoned to South Harney School District 33 (Fields School, K-8) and Harney County Union High School District 1J (the district for Crane Union). The Denio, Oregon, community was historically served by Crane Union, with the high school taking in several Basque Oregonians from there.

Denio has a public library, a branch of the Humboldt County Library.

Humboldt County is in the service area of Great Basin College. That college maintains the GBC Center in Winnemucca. Harney County is not in a community college district but has a "contract out of district" (COD) with Treasure Valley Community College. TVCC operates the Burns Outreach Center in Burns.

== Climate ==
Denio has a cold semi-arid climate under the Köppen climate classification system.

Climate data for Denio, Nevada (1991–2020 normals, extremes 1951–2017)
Month	Jan	Feb	Mar	Apr	May	Jun	Jul	Aug	Sep	Oct	Nov	Dec	Year
Record high °F (°C)	67 (19)	76 (24)	78 (26)	93 (34)	97 (36)	105 (41)	107 (42)	107 (42)	103 (39)	97 (36)	72 (22)	64 (18)	107 (42)
Mean maximum °F (°C)	53.8 (12.1)	58.9 (14.9)	69.0 (20.6)	80.1 (26.7)	88.5 (31.4)	95.1 (35.1)	101.1 (38.4)	100.2 (37.9)	92.3 (33.5)	83.1 (28.4)	66.2 (19.0)	53.9 (12.2)	102.1 (38.9)
Mean daily maximum °F (°C)	43.6 (6.4)	48.7 (9.3)	57.6 (14.2)	64.1 (17.8)	73.6 (23.1)	83.8 (28.8)	94.3 (34.6)	92.9 (33.8)	83.2 (28.4)	68.6 (20.3)	52.6 (11.4)	42.4 (5.8)	67.1 (19.5)
Daily mean °F (°C)	32.7 (0.4)	36.4 (2.4)	43.2 (6.2)	47.8 (8.8)	56.2 (13.4)	64.7 (18.2)	73.9 (23.3)	72.2 (22.3)	62.9 (17.2)	51.2 (10.7)	39.5 (4.2)	32.0 (0.0)	51.1 (10.6)
Mean daily minimum °F (°C)	21.7 (−5.7)	24.0 (−4.4)	28.7 (−1.8)	31.5 (−0.3)	38.8 (3.8)	45.7 (7.6)	53.5 (11.9)	51.5 (10.8)	42.6 (5.9)	33.8 (1.0)	26.4 (−3.1)	21.6 (−5.8)	35.0 (1.7)
Mean minimum °F (°C)	3.5 (−15.8)	8.2 (−13.2)	15.2 (−9.3)	17.6 (−8.0)	23.8 (−4.6)	32.8 (0.4)	40.4 (4.7)	38.3 (3.5)	27.6 (−2.4)	17.1 (−8.3)	9.3 (−12.6)	2.1 (−16.6)	−2.9 (−19.4)
Record low °F (°C)	−21 (−29)	−21 (−29)	0 (−18)	11 (−12)	14 (−10)	22 (−6)	29 (−2)	26 (−3)	17 (−8)	−2 (−19)	−4 (−20)	−25 (−32)	−25 (−32)
Average precipitation inches (mm)	0.73 (19)	0.82 (21)	0.98 (25)	1.00 (25)	1.36 (35)	0.76 (19)	0.25 (6.4)	0.30 (7.6)	0.29 (7.4)	0.65 (17)	0.77 (20)	1.19 (30)	9.10 (231)
Average snowfall inches (cm)	5.7 (14)	2.3 (5.8)	1.3 (3.3)	1.5 (3.8)	0.1 (0.25)	0.0 (0.0)	0.0 (0.0)	0.0 (0.0)	0.0 (0.0)	0.6 (1.5)	1.0 (2.5)	7.3 (19)	19.8 (50)
Average precipitation days (≥ 0.01 in)	5.4	5.0	7.1	6.9	6.7	4.5	1.7	1.7	2.4	4.3	4.9	6.2	56.8
Average snowy days (≥ 0.1 in)	2.3	1.5	0.8	0.6	0.0	0.0	0.0	0.0	0.0	0.3	1.1	2.5	9.1
Source: NOAA (mean maxima/minima 1981–2010)

== Demographics ==
Historical population
Census	Pop.	Note	%±
2010	47		—
2020	34		−27.7%
U.S. Decennial Census

== Healthcare ==
In 2005 the hospital, Harney District Hospital in Burns, Oregon, provided a traveling doctor in a mobile trailer which covered southern parts of Harney County; the trailer also stopped in Denio, Nevada.

== See also ==
- List of census-designated places in Nevada
- Hatfield, California–Oregon
- McDermitt, Nevada and Oregon
