= Vya, Nevada =

Ghost town in Nevada, United States

- Unincorporated community
- Location within the state of Nevada
- Country: United States
- State: Nevada
- County: Washoe
- Elevation: 5,574 ft (1,699 m)
- Time zone: UTC-8 (Pacific (PST))
  - Summer (DST): UTC-7 (PDT)

Vya is a small ghost town located in Washoe County, in northwestern Nevada, United States. It is about 10 miles (16 km) east of the California state line, north of Forty Nine Canyon. Not much remains of the small town, which essentially died in the 1920s. Just two wooden buildings can still be seen—the Vya Post Office and Library. The Vya Post Office was in operation from September 1910 until October 1941. The settlement was named for Vya Wimer, the first European heritage baby born in the valley.

The vicinity of Vya has since evolved into the Old Yella Dog Ranch, a working guest ranch, with facilities for RVs and camping.

There had been no agricultural interest in Vya and the surrounding area until the Enlarged Homestead Act where 320 acres were given to farmers. A post office opened in 1910, and a school and store were built in 1915. Long Valley Land and Development had plans to construct an irrigation system and reservoir fed by lakes east of Vya. This project was never completed, so there was no stable water supply for the households. Despite wet years when farming in the area commenced, drought in the early 1920s led to crop failure and most of the town was abandoned. The population had dropped to fifty by the 1940 United States census and the post office and school closed in 1941.

In the winter of 1993, a young man named Jim Stolpa, his wife, and baby, became snowbound while driving through northern Nevada. After an almost 30-hour, 50-mile (80 km) walk, Stolpa was found near Vya. The Stolpas' ordeal was made into a movie, Snowbound: The Jim and Jennifer Stolpa Story.

== See also ==
- List of ghost towns in Nevada
