= Nevada State Route 794 =

State highway in Nevada, United States

State Route 794
- SR 794 highlighted in red

Route information
- Maintained by NDOT
- Length: 2.439 mi (3.925 km)

Major junctions
- West end: SR 289 / I-80 BL in Winnemucca
- I-80 northeast of Winnemucca
- East end: Cattle guard on Pedroli Avenue north of I-80 northeast of Winnemucca

Location
- Country: United States
- State: Nevada
- Counties: Humboldt

Highway system
- Interstate Highway System; Main; Auxiliary; Suffixed; Business; Future; Nevada State Highway System; Interstate; US; State; Pre‑1976; Scenic
← SR 789	→ SR 795

State Route 794 (SR 794) is a 2.439-mile (3.925 km)state highway in Humboldt County, Nevada, United States. The highway primarily serves as a connector road east of Winnemucca and, for all but the very east end of the route, SR 794 is concurrent with Interstate 80 Business (I‑80 Bus.) as it runs along East Winnemucca Boulevard.

== Route description ==
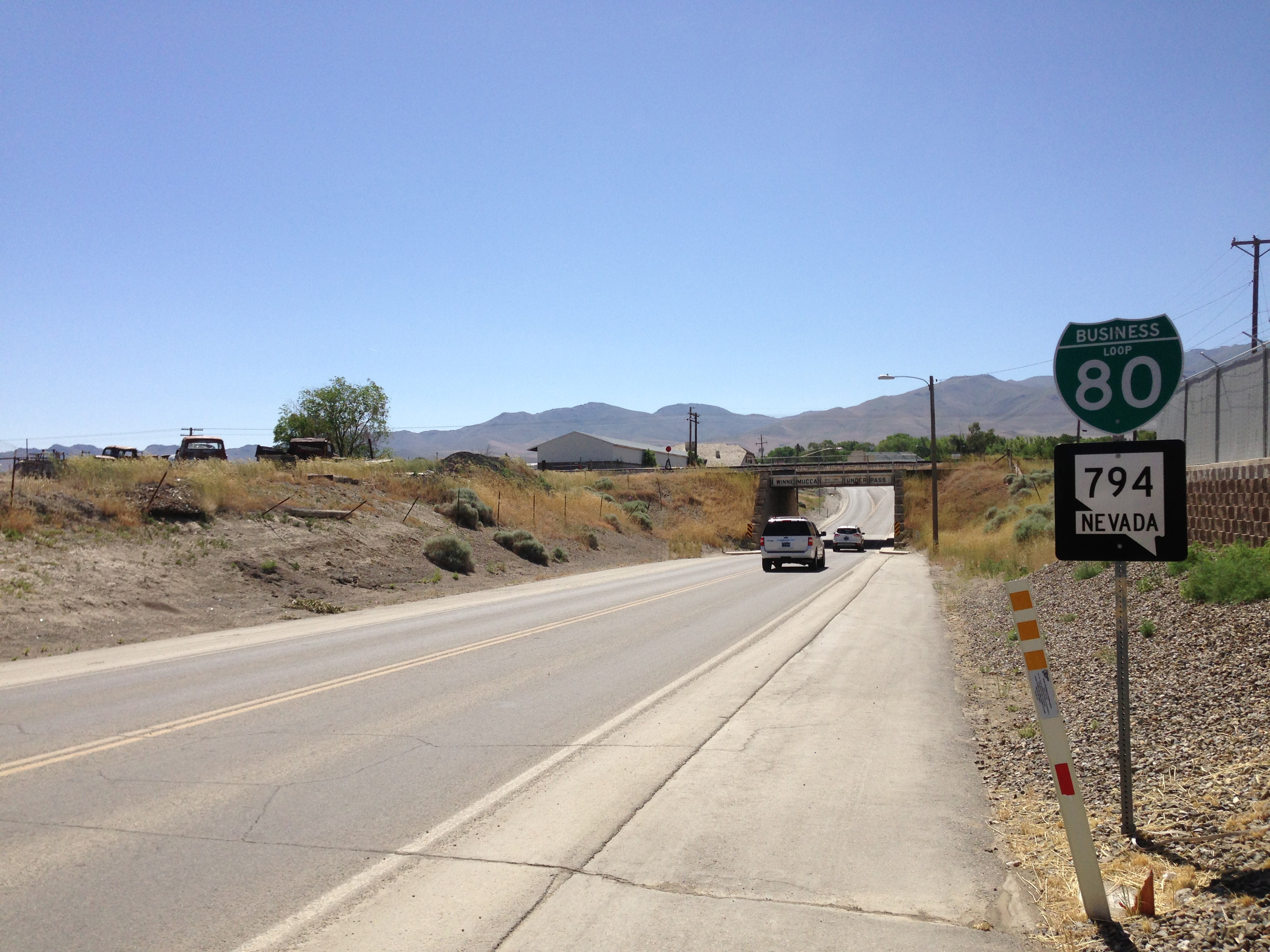
Looking east-southeast along SR 794 (East Winnemucca Boulevard), from near its western terminus in Winnemucca, at the Union Pacific Railroad tracks overpass, June 2014

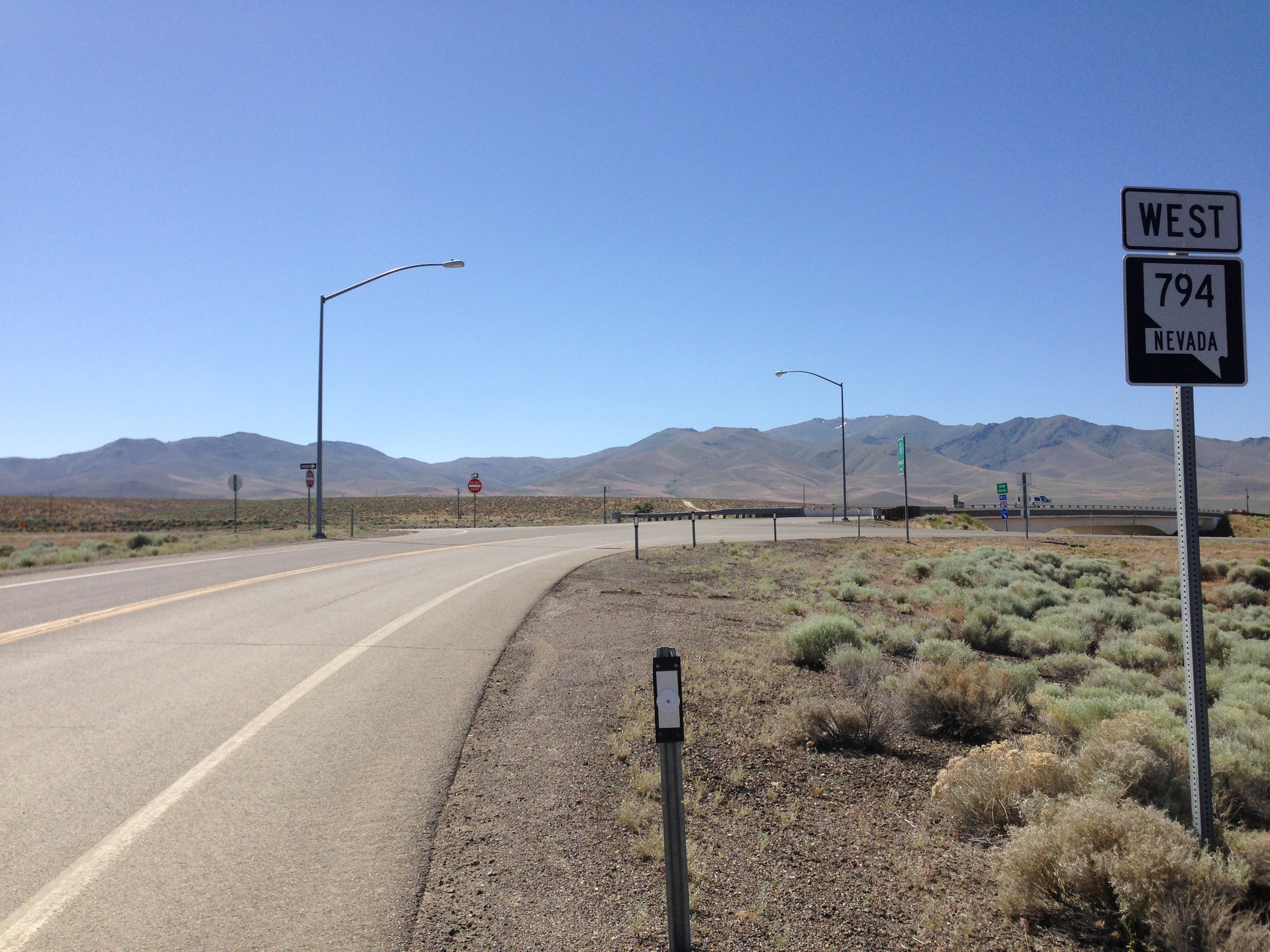
Looking southeast along SR 794 (Pedroli Avenue), from near its eastern terminus northeast of Winnemucca, toward the I-80/-80 Bus/SR 794 interchange (Exit 180), June 2014

SR 794 begins at T-intersection with East Winnemucca Boulevard/East 2nd Street (SR 289) in northern Winnemucca. (From the intersection, SR 289 heads southwest [concurrent with I‑80 Bus.] along East Winnemucca Boulevard toward U.S. Route 95. SR 289 heads northeast along East 2nd Street toward I-80 [Exit 178] and then SR 795.) From its western terminus SR 794 heads southeast along East Winnemucca Boulevard (concurrent with I‑80 Bus.) to cross East 4th Street and pass under a moderately low railroad overpass (Note: The height of the railroad overpass along SR 794/Interstate 80 Business in Winnemucca has a clearance of only 14 feet (4.3 m).) (that carries a single set of Union Pacific Railroad tracks) before reaching an intersection with East Haskell Street/Fairgrounds Road. (East Haskell Road heads southwest to become State Route 294 [SR 294] at a junction with the eastern terminus of State Route 787. [Prior to 2017, SR 294 extended east to East Winnemucca Boulevard.] Fairgrounds Road heads northeast to loop past multiple Humboldt County facilities [fairgrounds, sheriff's office, county jail, etc.] before reconnecting with SR 794.)

Just after the intersection with East Haskell Street/Fairgrounds Road, SR 794 gradually curves easterly until it heads northeast and reaches an intersection with the north end of North Highland Drive. (From this intersection a dirt road also heads north to connect with Fairgrounds Road.) Continuing northeast the route connects with the east end of Fairgrounds Road (which runs north from the route), the north end of Estate Road, the south end of Guthrie Drive, the south end of Maslona Drive, the north end of Great Basin Drive, and the north end of Wild West Way. After connecting with the north end of Rim Rock Drive, (Note: Prior to the construction of Interstate 80 (I-80), what is now Rock Drive (on the south of East Winnemucca Boulevard) and Pedroli Avenue (on the north of I-80) were part of a single, straight, and connected north-south road.) SR 794 curves to very briefly head east before curving north and connecting with I‑80 at a diamond interchange (Exit 180). On the north edge of the interchange East Winnemucca Boulevard becomes Pedroli Avenue, which promptly curves the west and quickly arrives at the eastern terminus of SR 794 at a cattle guard. (On the immediate west side of the cattle guard, Pedroli Avenue turns north, becomes a dirt road, and heads north to Weso. The road continues westerly as Pedroli Lane, being still paved for a short distance farther as it heads toward a nearby farm.)

== Major intersections ==
The entire route is in Humboldt County.

Location	mi	km	Destinations	Notes
Winnemucca	0.000	0.000	SR 289 (East Winnemucca Boulevard, East 2nd Street) / I-80 BL west – US 95, I-80	Western terminus; western end of I-80 Bus. concurrency
Winnemucca			Union Pacific Railroad tracks overpass	
Winnemucca			East Haskell Street west – SR 294 / SR 787 junction Fairgrounds Road east – SR 794 / I-80 Bus.	SR 294 previously extended east on East Haskell Street from its current eastern terminus to East Winnemucca Boulevard; Fairgrounds Road forms a northern loop off SR 794/I-80 Bus.
			I-80 – Elko, Reno	Diamond interchange; eastern end of I-80 Bus. concurrency; I-80 Exit 180; On the north edge of the interchange East Winnemucca Boulevard becomes Pedroli Avenue
	2.439	3.925	Cattle guard on Pedroli Avenue north of I-80	Eastern terminus
	2.439	3.925	Pedroli Lane west – farm	Continuation beyond eastern terminus
1.000 mi = 1.609 km; 1.000 km = 0.621 mi: Concurrency terminus

== See also ==
- List of state routes in Nevada
- List of highways numbered 794
