= Paradise Hill, Nevada =

Unincorporated community in Nevada, US

Paradise Hill
- Unincorporated community
- Location within Nevada Location within the United States
- Country: United States
- State: Nevada
- County: Humboldt
- Elevation: 4,492 ft (1,369 m)
- Time zone: UTC-8 (Pacific (PST))
  - Summer (DST): UTC-7 (PDT)
- GNIS feature ID: 858276

Paradise Hill is an unincorporated community in Humboldt County, Nevada, United States. It is located along U.S. Route 95 at the junction of Nevada State Route 290 in Paradise Valley and is approximately 21 miles north of Winnemucca.

Paradise Hill is the site of a truck stop with a Sinclair gas station with a Dino Mart convenience store and a lounge for truckers.
