= Nevada State Route 795 =

State highway in Nevada, United States

State Route 795
- Reinhart Lane (Note: Reinhart Lane (SR 795) often has its name spelled on maps as "Rhinehart". The United States Postal Service indicates that "Reinhart" is the appropriate spelling. (Reinhart Drive, the road north of Winnemucca, should not be confused with Reinhard Street, a three-block street in north-central Winnemucca, which also connects with SR 289 [East Winnemucca Drive].))
- SR 795 highlighted in red

Route information
- Maintained by NDOT
- Length: 1.245 mi (2.004 km)
- Existed: May 1, 1999–present

Major junctions
- South end: SR 289 north of Winnemucca (Note: Despite many maps (such as Google Maps, Bing Maps, etc.) showing the southern terminus of SR 795 (its junction with SR 289) within the city limits of Winnemucca, maps produced by the County Assessor's Office of Humboldt County indicate that the city limits actually end at the southeast edge of the East Second Street right-of-way and do not include the road itself (and therefore the southern terminus of SR 795).)
- North end: US 95 north of Winnemucca

Location
- Country: United States
- State: Nevada
- County: Humboldt

Highway system
- Nevada State Highway System; Interstate; US; State; Pre‑1976; Scenic
← SR 794	→ SR 796

State Route 795 (SR 795) is a short state highway in southern Humboldt County, Nevada, United States. One of Nevada's newest state routes, SR 795 (named Reinhart Lane for entire route) primarily serves as a connector road north of Winnemucca.

== Route description ==
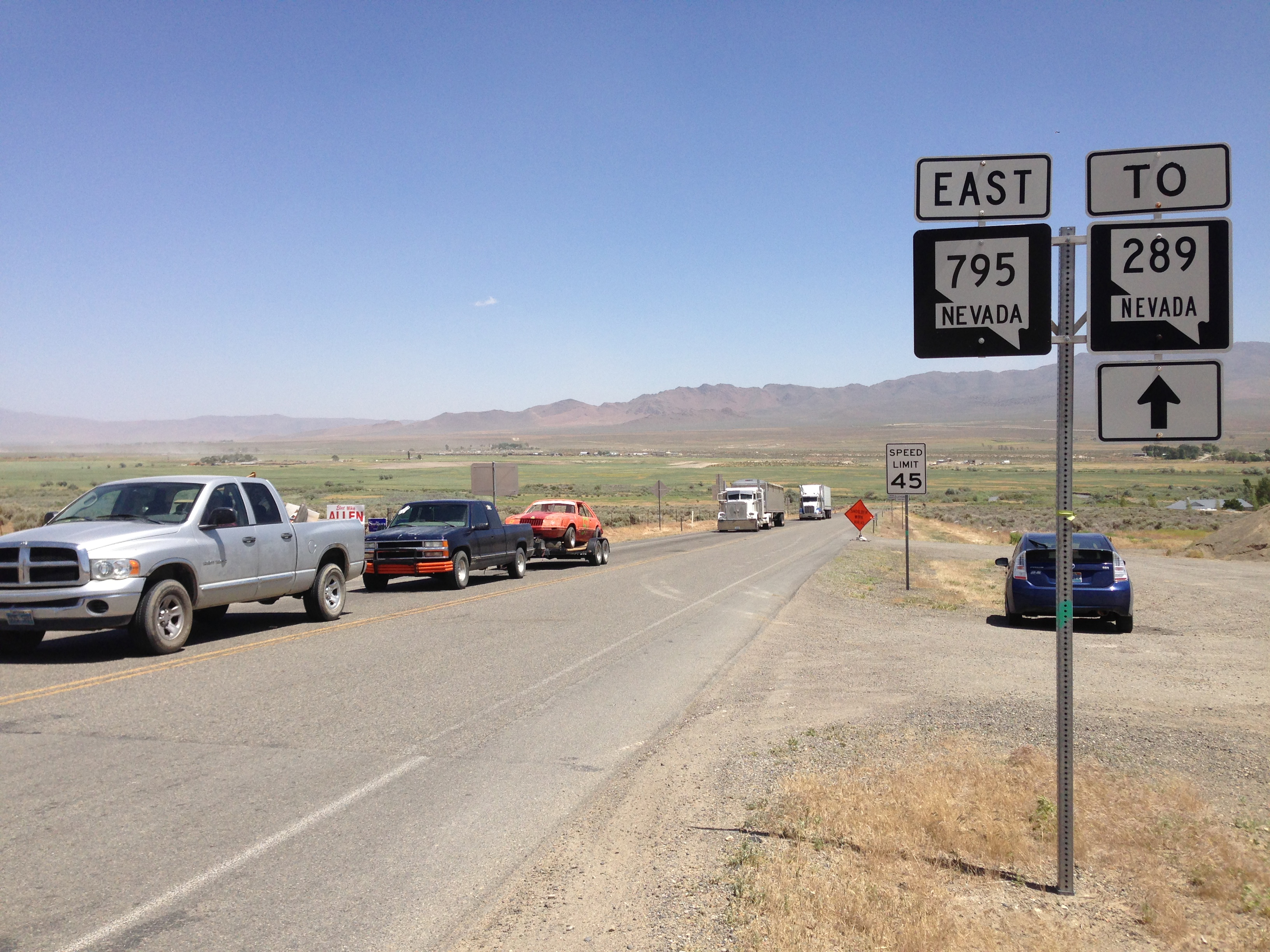
Looking southeast along SR 795 from its northern terminus, June 2014

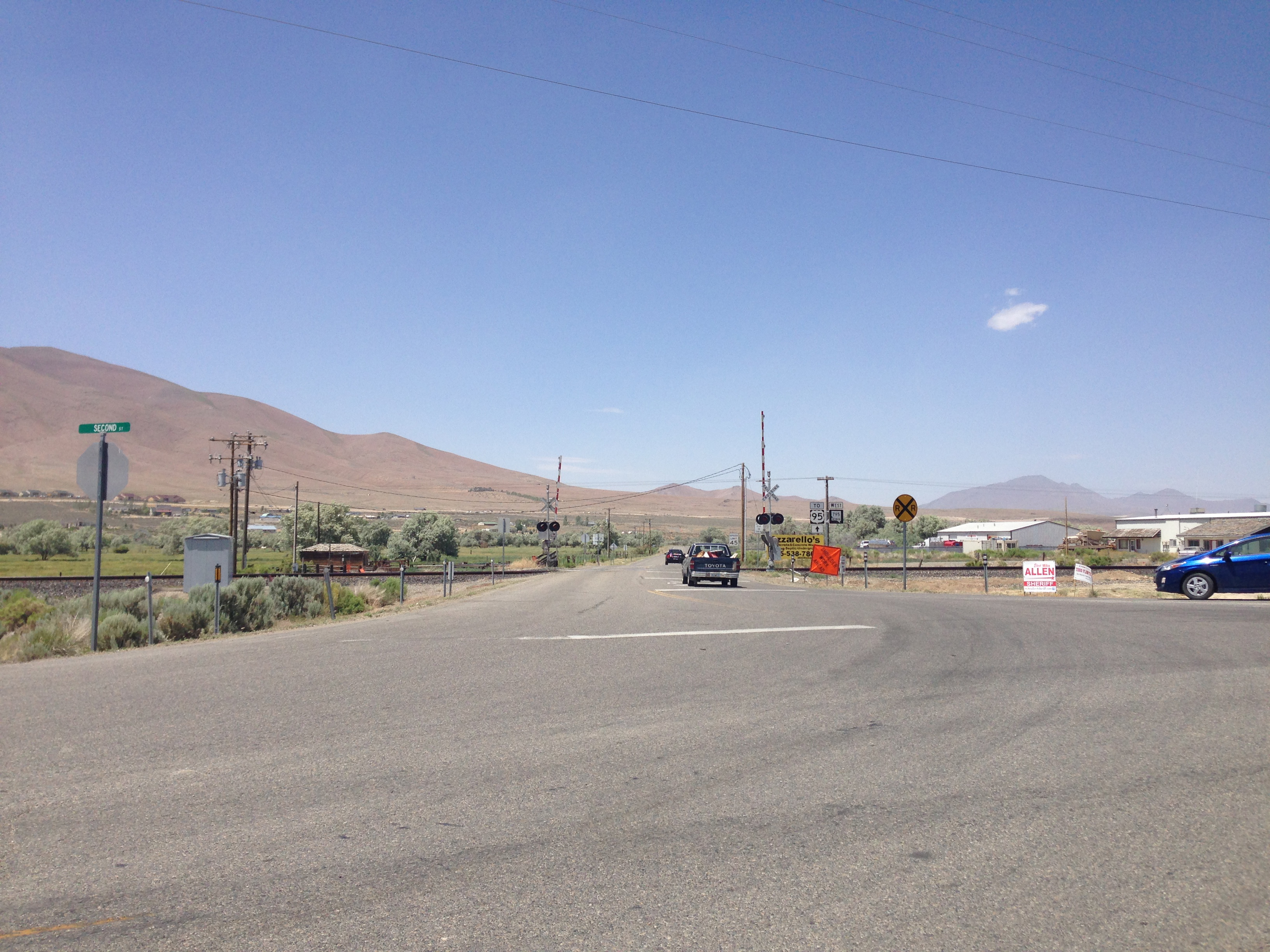
Looking east across East 2nd Street (and the eastern terminus point of SR 289) at the eastern terminus of SR 795, June 2014

SR 795 begins at a T intersection with East 2nd Street about 1.6 miles (2.6 km) northeast of downtown Winnemucca and immediately northwest of the city limits. (East 2nd Street heads northeast through Weso to end near the south bank of the Humboldt River. East 2nd Street heads southwest as SR 289 to downtown Winnemucca to connect with U.S. Route 95 [US 95].) From its southern terminus, SR 795 heads northwest along Reinhart Lane to cross the Humboldt River.

Just after the river crossing, SR 795 has an intersection with East National Avenue, which heads south-southwest to northwest Winnemucca. (The road continues north-northeast as a dirt road roughly following the course of the river.) SR 795 then curves to a northerly course before turning to head west-northwest and reaching its northern terminus at US 95, about 2.5 miles (4.0 km) north of downtown Winnemucca. (Reinhart Drive continues a bit farther to a T intersection with Sage Heights Drive. US 95 heads south to downtown Winnemucca and north to Oregon and western Idaho.) SR 795, along with SR 289, provides an alternate and more direct connection between northern Humboldt County on US 95 and destinations east on Interstate 80.

== History ==
Prior to becoming a state route in the late 1990s, SR 795 existed as a dirt road maintained by Humboldt County. The route historically served as a shortcut to Winnemucca and was experiencing increasing traffic volumes. The county worked with the Nevada Department of Transportation to bring the road to state highway standards and include it the state highway system. The newly constructed highway opened in early 1999, and was officially approved as SR 795 on May 1, 1999.

== Major intersections ==
The entire route is in Humboldt County.

Location	mi	km	Destinations	Notes
	0.000	0.000	SR 289 south / East 2nd Street	Southern terminus of SR 795 and eastern terminus of SR 289 immediately northeast of the Winnemucca city limits
			Bridge over the Humboldt River	
	1.245	2.004	US 95 – Winnemucca, Jordan Valley (Oregon), Homedale (Idaho)	Northern terminus
	1.245	2.004	Reinhart Lane – Sage Heights Drive	Continuation west beyond northern terminus
1.000 mi = 1.609 km; 1.000 km = 0.621 mi

== See also ==
- List of state routes in Nevada
- List of highways numbered 795
