= Cold Creek =

Cold Creek may refer to:

== Arts, entertainment, and media ==
- Cold Creek County, a Canadian country rock group
- Cold Creek Manor, a 2003 American horror thriller film

== Places ==
- Cold Creek (Russian River tributary), a watercourse in Mendocino County, California, United States
- Cold Creek, Nevada, United States, an unincorporated community
- Cold Creek Conservation Area, a protected Area of Natural and Scientific Interest in Ontario, Canada
- Cold Creek Correctional Facility, a former prison in Lauerdale County, Tennessee, United States
