= Nevada State Route 289 =

State highway in Nevada, United States

State Route 289
- SR 289 highlighted in red

Route information
- Maintained by NDOT
- Length: 1.637 mi (2.634 km)
- Existed: July 1, 1976–present

Major junctions
- West end: US 95 / I-80 BL in Winnemucca
- I-80 in Winnemucca; SR 794 / I-80 BL in Winnemucca
- East end: SR 795 north of Winnemucca (Note: Despite many maps (such as Google Maps, Bing Maps, etc.) showing the northern terminus of SR 289 (its junction with SR 795) within the city limits of Winnemucca, maps produced by the County Assessor's Office of Humboldt County indicate that the city limits actually end at the southeast edge of the East Second Street right-of-way and do not include the road itself (and therefore the northern terminus of SR 289).)

Location
- Country: United States
- State: Nevada
- County: Humboldt

Highway system
- Nevada State Highway System; Interstate; US; State; Pre‑1976; Scenic
← SR 278	→ SR 290

State Route 289 (SR 289) is a 1.637-mile (2.634 km) state highway in southern Humboldt County, Nevada, United States. The route serves the city of Winnemucca and the route's western end runs concurrent with Interstate 80 Business (I‑80 Bus.).

== Route description ==
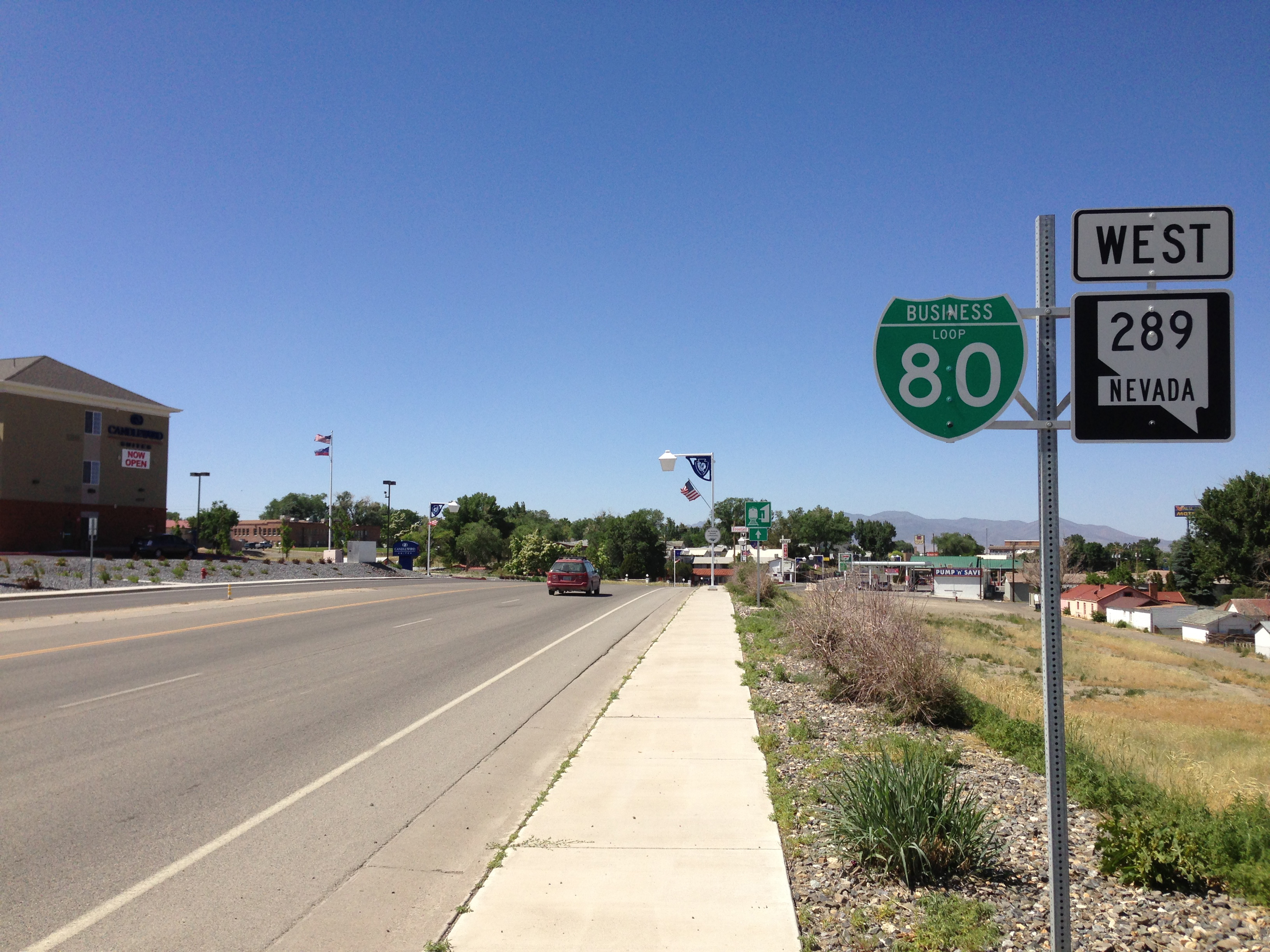
View westbound along East Winnemucca Boulevard (SR 289/I-80 Bus.) in Winnemucca, June 2014

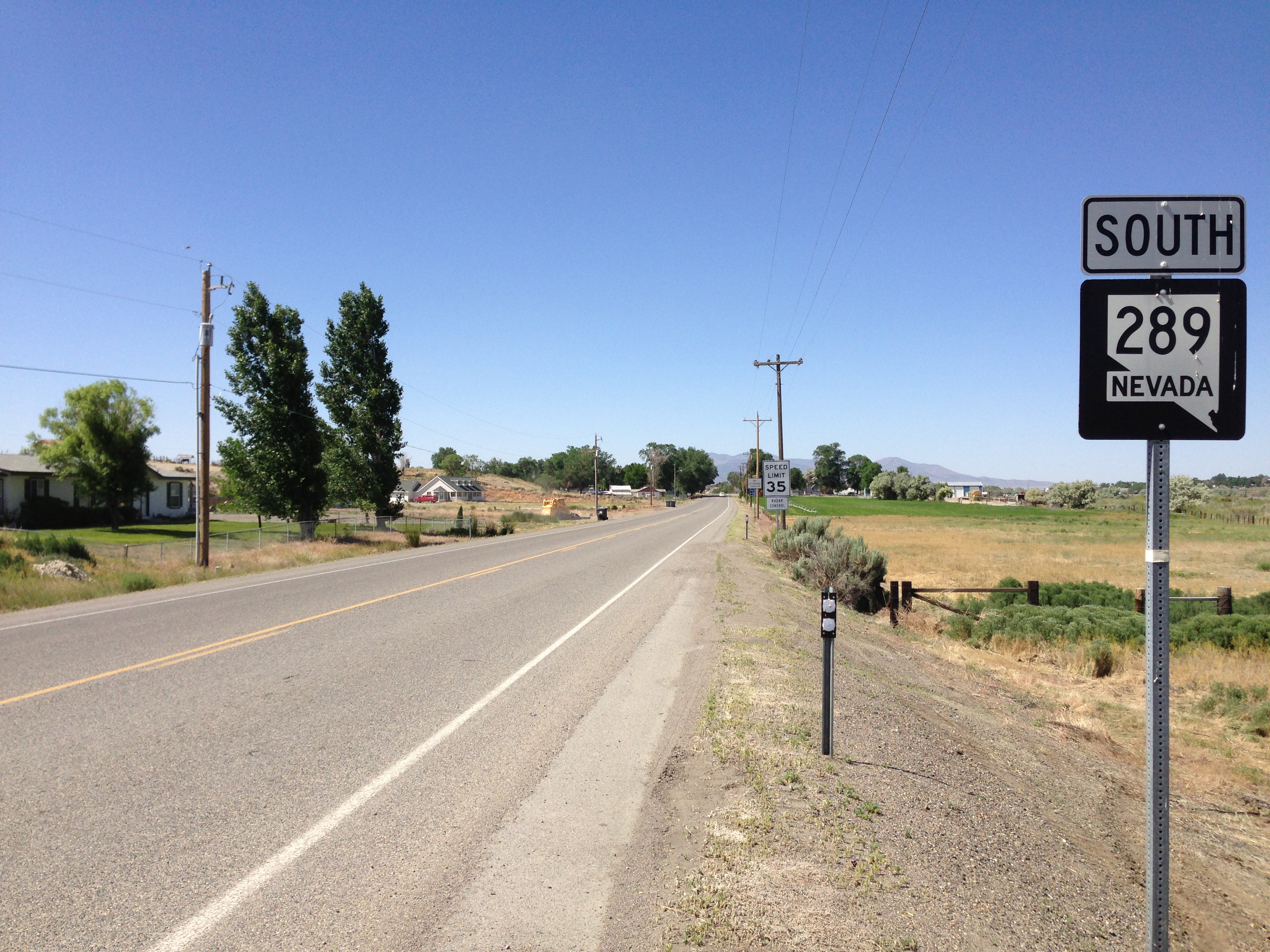
First reassurance sign along southbound SR 289 (East Second Street), June 2014

SR 289 begins at the intersection of Melarkey Street and Winnemucca Boulevard in downtown (commercial district of) Winnemucca. (Melarkey Street is the dividing point between West Winnemucca Boulevard and East Winnemucca Boulevard. Melarkey Street continues northwest as U.S. Route 95 [US 95], but southeast as just a city street. West Winnemucca Boulevard (I‑80 Bus./US 95) continues southwest to an interchange with I‑80.) From its western terminus, SR 289 heads northeast along East Winnemucca Boulevard (I‑80 Bus./US 95) as a four-lane road to cross South Bridge Street and Baud Street before passing briefly passing by the northwest edge of a residential area and the southeast end of the short Barrett Street. After crossing Reinhart Street, commercial district resumes on both sides of SR 289 before it passes the southeast end of the short Hurst Street.

The route then turns slightly to a more northerly course as it gains a median strip between its four lanes, just before reaching its next intersection with East 2nd Street. From this T intersection, East Winnemucca Boulevard heads southwest as SR 794/I‑80 Bus., while SR 289 continues northeast along East 2nd Street. Next the route quickly reaches a diamond interchange with Interstate 80 (Exit 178), followed by a T intersection with the south end of See Drive (a dirt road which very briefly heads southeast from SR 289 before turning northwest and then looping back to SR 289). After passing See Drive, SR 289 loses its median strip and narrows to a two-lane road; remaining as such for the rest of its length.

Traveling through rural area, the route passes northwest of a mobile home park before leaving the city limits of Winnemucca and immediately reaching a T intersection with the north end of See Drive (which heads southeast from the route and is paved for a short section on its north end). Finally SR 289 reaches its eastern terminus at an intersection with Reinhart Drive (SR 795). (Note: Reinhart Lane (SR 795) often has its name spelled on maps as "Rhinehart". The United States Postal Service indicates that "Reinhart" is the appropriate spelling. (Reinhart Drive, the road north of Winnemucca, should not be confused with Reinhard Street, a three-block street in north-central Winnemucca, which also connects with SR 289 [East Winnemucca Drive].)) From the eastern terminus of SR 289, East 2nd Street continues northeast through Weso to end near the south bank of the Humboldt River. SR 795 heads northwest to cross the Humboldt River and connect with US 95.

SR 289 was part of SR 1 and US 40 from the 1920s through the mid-1970s.

== History ==
The highway was formerly part of Nevada State Route 1 and later U.S. Route 40. SR 289 became a state highway on July 1, 1976, during the renumbering of Nevada's state highway system.

== Major intersections ==
The entire route is in Humboldt County.

Location	mi	km	Destinations	Notes
Winnemucca	0.000	0.000	US 95 south / I-80 BL west (West Winnemucca Boulevard) – Reno	Continuation beyond western terminus
Winnemucca	0.000	0.000	US 95 north / Melarkey Street – Lakeview, Boise	Western terminus; Western end of I-80 Bus. concurrency
Winnemucca			SR 794 east (East Winnemucca Boulevard) / I-80 BL east	Eastern end of I-80 Bus. concurrency
Winnemucca			I-80 – Elko, Reno	Diamond interchange; I-80 Exit 179
	1.637	2.634	SR 795 north (Reinhart Lane) – US 95	Eastern terminus; immediately northeast of Winnemucca city limits
	1.637	2.634	East Second Street (north) – Weso	Continuation beyond eastern terminus
1.000 mi = 1.609 km; 1.000 km = 0.621 mi: Concurrency terminus

== See also ==
- List of state routes in Nevada
- List of highways numbered 289
