= U.S. Route 95 Truck (Hawthorne, Nevada) =

Highway in Nevada

U.S. Route 95 Truck
- Freedom Road
- US 95 Truck / SR 362 highlighted in red

Route information
- Maintained by NDOT
- Length: 1.297 mi (2.087 km)

Major junctions
- South end: US 95 in Hawthorne
- North end: US 95 in Hawthorne

Location
- Country: United States
- State: Nevada
- County: Mineral

Highway system
- United States Numbered Highway System; List; Special; Divided; Nevada State Highway System; Interstate; US; State; Pre‑1976; Scenic
← SR 361	SR 362	→ SR 372

U.S. Route 95 Truck (US 95 Truck) is a truck route of US 95 in Mineral County, Nevada, in the United States. It serves as a bypass route for trucks taking US 95 past Hawthorne in either direction, as US 95 itself goes through that community. The route is co-designated as State Route 362 (SR 362); however, that designation is unsigned.

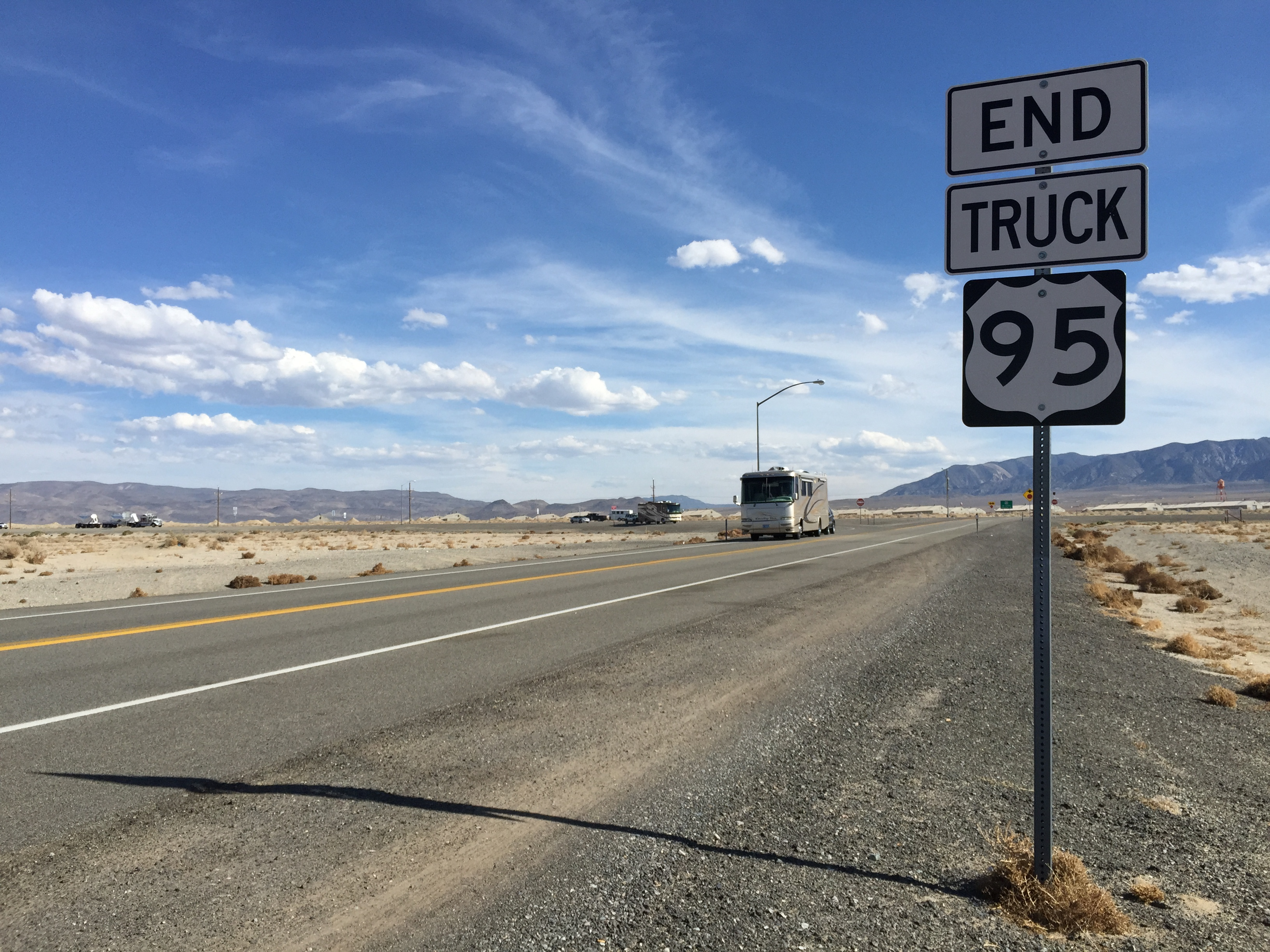
View near the south end of US 95 Truck (SR 362) looking southbound as seen in 2015

== Route description ==
The highway begins southeast of Hawthorne and deviates from US 95 passing to the east of the city. Signs direct all trucks with hazardous material to use US 95 Truck instead of the main route. The highway passes by the truck and cargo entrance to the Hawthorne Army Depot. It then enters Hawthorne city limits before reaching its northern junction with US 95.

The route has been named Freedom Road by the state.

== History ==
The bypass was proposed in the early 1980s to divert trucks carrying hazardous cargo from entering Hawthorne. Mineral County officials rejected the first two designs submitted by the Nevada Department of Transportation before accepting a third in 1982, despite reluctance from business owners over fears of lost tourist traffic.

== Major intersections ==
The entire route is in Hawthorne, Mineral County.

mi	km	Destinations	Notes
0.000	0.000	US 95 – Tonopah, Fallon	Southern terminus
1.297	2.087	US 95 – Tonopah, Fallon	Northern terminus
1.000 mi = 1.609 km; 1.000 km = 0.621 mi

== See also ==
- List of U.S. Routes in Nevada
