= Nevada Subdivision =

Railway line in Nevada

The Nevada Subdivision is a railway line in Nevada owned by the Union Pacific Railroad, as part of the Overland Route. It runs from Sparks to Weso, Nevada, east of Winnemucca. While part of the Overland Route, the line also serves to connect the Central Corridor to California via the Donner Pass route through the Sierra Nevada. The line was originally built as a segment of the first transcontinental railroad between June and November 1868. While primarily utilized for freight since 1971, the route is used by the once-daily Amtrak California Zephyr. As of 2003 the line hosts 14 freight trains per day.
