= U.S. Route 95 in Nevada =

Section of U.S. Highway in Nevada, United States

U.S. Route 95
- Veterans Memorial Highway
- US 95 highlighted in red

Route information
- Maintained by NDOT
- Length: 646.71 mi (1,040.78 km) 508.410 miles (818.207 km) independent of other routes
- Existed: January 1, 1940–present
- Restrictions: No hazardous materials through Hawthorne, must use US 95 Truck

Major junctions
- South end: US 95 at the California state line in Palm Gardens
- I-11 / US 93 / SR 173 in Boulder City; I-215 / SR 564 in Henderson; I-15 / US 93 in Las Vegas; SR 613 in Las Vegas; CC 215 in Las Vegas; US 6 from Tonopah to Coaldale; US 50 in Fallon; I-80 from Trinity (near Lovelock) to Winnemucca
- North end: US 95 at the Oregon state line in McDermitt

Location
- Country: United States
- State: Nevada
- Counties: Clark, Nye, Esmeralda, Mineral, Lyon, Churchill, Pershing, Humboldt

Highway system
- United States Numbered Highway System; List; Special; Divided; Nevada State Highway System; Interstate; US; State; Pre‑1976; Scenic
← US 93	→ SR 115

U.S. Route 95 (US 95) is a major U.S. highway traversing the U.S. state of Nevada from north to south directly through Las Vegas and providing connections to both Carson City (via US 50 in Silver Springs, Nevada area only) and Reno (via Interstate 80 in Fernley, Nevada only or U.S. 95A north to U.S. 50 west to I-580/U.S. 395 north in Carson City, Nevada area only). US 95 is cosigned with Interstate 80 for 95 miles (153 km) between Winnemucca and a junction 32 miles north of Fallon before heading north into Oregon at McDermitt. At 646.71 miles (1,040.78 km), it is the longest highway in Nevada.

Along much of its course through Nevada, US 95 has signs designating it as the Veterans Memorial Highway. A portion of the route in Las Vegas northwest of downtown is also called the Oran K. Gragson Freeway, named for Las Vegas mayor Oran K. Gragson who advocated for construction of that portion of freeway in the 1960s.

== Route description ==
U.S. Route 95 enters Nevada in Palm Gardens and heads north towards Railroad Pass, where it meets Interstate 11 and US 93.

The three routes are then co-signed in the Las Vegas Valley and east of Henderson, I-11 is co-signed with US 93/95 for its entire route around the eastern Las Vegas Valley.

I-11 continues through a Spaghetti junction known as the Henderson Spaghetti Bowl or Hender-Bender interchange of Interstate 215 and SR 564.

The freeway then heads west into Downtown Las Vegas, where it intersects Interstate 15. At the Spaghetti Bowl interchange, US 93 follows I-15 northbound.

From I-15 to Elkhorn Road, I-11 and US 95 have HOV lanes that are currently enforced by both LVMPD (aka Metro) and NSP (formerly NHP).

I-11 and US 95 head west, then north at an interchange with Summerlin Parkway (SR 613) over Rainbow Boulevard. Eventually, the freeway passes through the Centennial Bowl with the Las Vegas Beltway (CC 215) in the northwest at Centennial Hills where I-11 currently ends at Kyle Canyon Road (SR 157) and Sunstone Parkway.

The freeway portion then currently ends at Corn Creek Road, northwest of the Las Vegas Valley and then it becomes a brief four-lane divided highway.

US 95 exits Clark County and heads into eastern Nye County for 107 miles. The four-lane divided highway currently ends past the Mercury interchange.

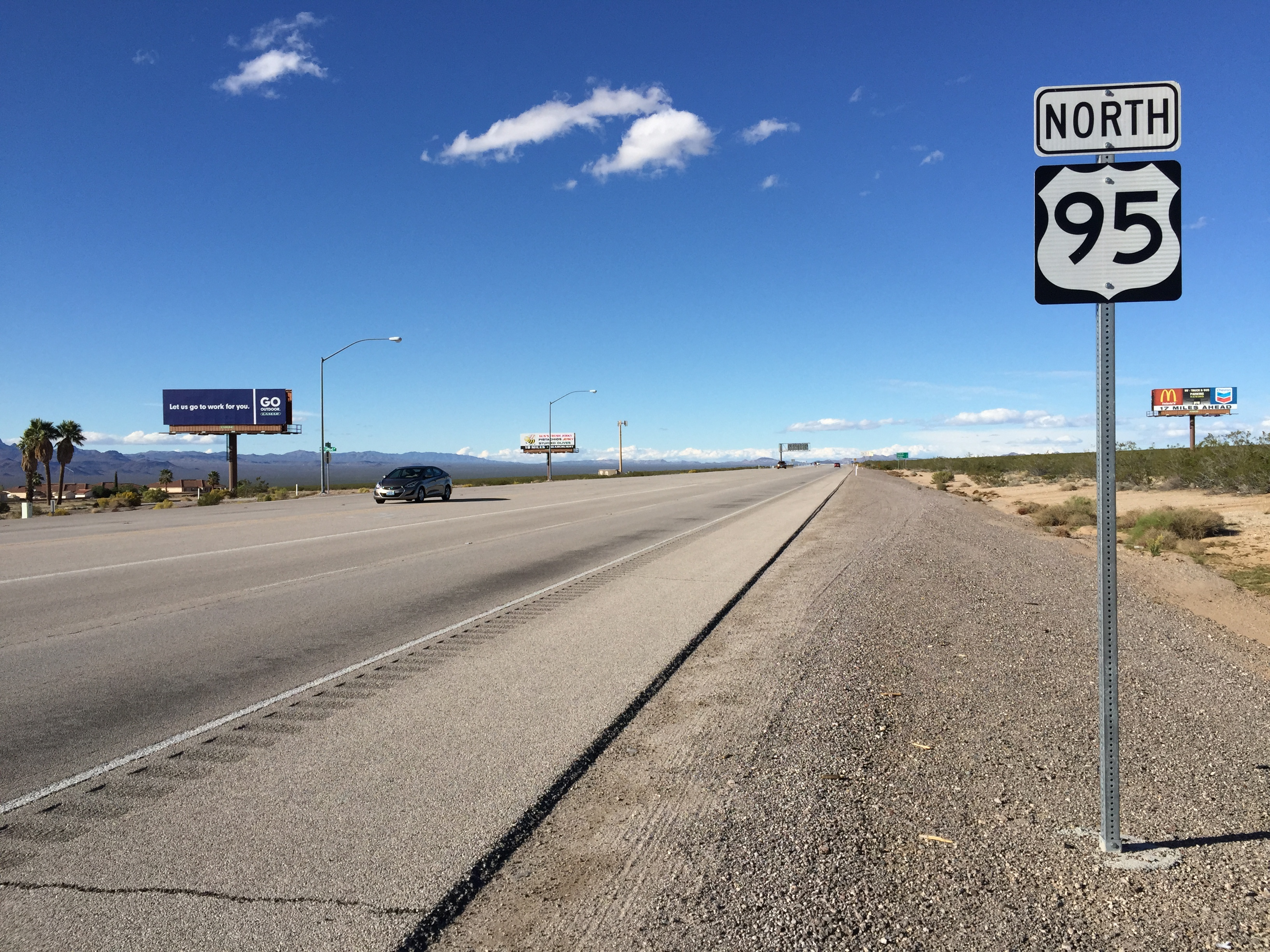
View north along US 95 just after entering Nevada from California in Palm Gardens as seen in 2015

It then enters Esmeralda and continues for 44 miles before meeting US 6 in Tonopah, back in Nye County. US 6/95 leave Tonopah, after two miles, enters Esmeralda County again and heads west for 41 miles (66 km) until Coaldale, where US 6 splits west towards California and its western terminus at US 395 in Bishop, California.

US 95 then heads northwest towards Hawthorne and Schurz, where US 95 Alternate splits west towards US 50, providing an alternate route towards Carson City and Reno.

US 95 itself goes north towards Fallon, where it intersects US 50. US 95 meets Interstate 80 and US 95 Alternate about halfway between Lovelock and Fernley. The two routes then run concurrently for 95 miles (153 km) until reaching Winnemucca, where US 95 splits from I-80 and follows Interstate 80 Business into downtown Winnemucca.

In Downtown Winnemucca, US 95 turns north in the general direction of Paradise Valley, leaving Interstate 80 Business to follow SR 289 east. North of Winnemucca, US 95 meets the eastern terminus of SR 140, which connects to Lakeview (U.S. Route 395) and Klamath Falls, Oregon and the Pacific Northwest. US 95 finally exits Nevada at McDermitt and heads into Oregon.

== History ==
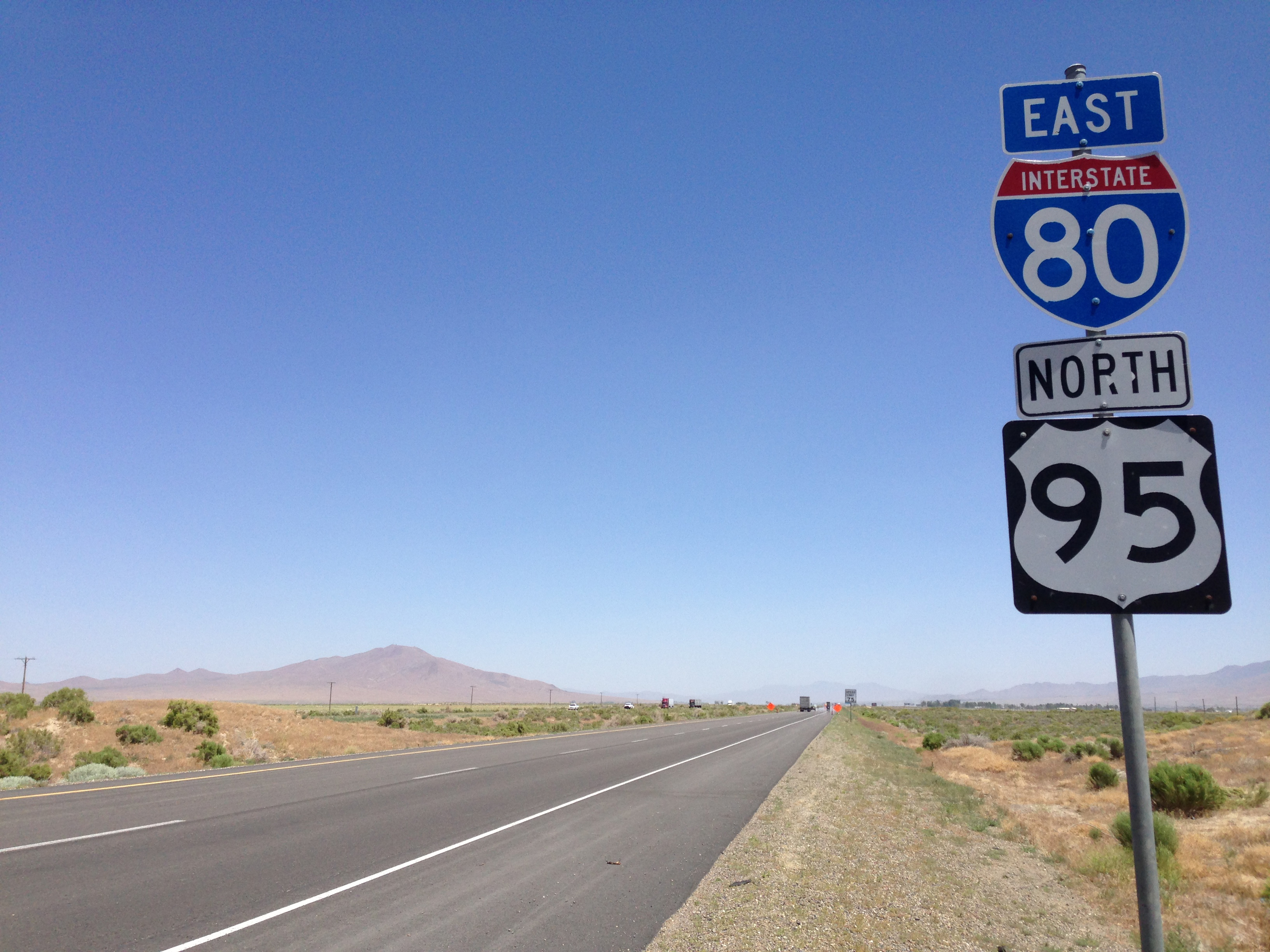
I-80/US 95 concurrency near Winnemucca as seen in 2014

=== Extension into Nevada ===
When the original plan for the U.S. highway system was adopted by the American Association of State Highway Officials (AASHO) in 1926, US 95 was one of the routes created. At that time, however, the route only existed in Idaho from the Canada–United States border near Eastport to Weiser near the Oregon state line.

A proposal to extend US 95 south to Winnemucca was considered by AASHO in 1937; however, action was deferred due to incomplete sections in Oregon. AASHO reconsidered the idea at its meeting on June 28, 1939, as part of a larger plan to extend the highway south to Blythe, California. This plan was adopted, officially establishing US 95 throughout Nevada effective January 1, 1940. The route was marked along several preexisting state highways as follows:

- From the Oregon state line at McDermitt, US 95 followed State Route 8 for 74 miles (119 km) to Winnemucca.
- At Winnemucca, the route joined U.S. Route 40 (State Route 1), traveling 131 miles (211 km) southwest via Lovelock to Fernley.
- In Fernley, US 95 followed State Route 2 for 28 miles (45 km) to Fallon (with a short overlap on U.S. Route 50 west of Fallon).
- The highway turned south at Fallon, running 39 miles (63 km) concurrently with the southern segment of State Route 1A to Schurz.
- At Schurz, US 95 was routed along State Route 3, zigzagging 178 miles (286 km) south and east through Hawthorne, Luning, Coaldale, Tonopah and Goldfield (including an overlap with U.S. Route 6 between Coaldale and Tonopah).
- South of Goldfield, the highway overlapped the entire 236 miles (380 km) of State Route 5, traveling southeast through Beatty and Indian Springs to Las Vegas, joining U.S. Route 93/U.S. Route 466 through Henderson to Boulder City, then splitting from US 93/466 heading south through Searchlight towards the California state line en route to Needles.

The Nevada portion of US 95 covered a distance of approximately 686 miles (1,104 km). The entire route was on paved roads, except for a small portion of SR 5 between the California state line and Searchlight.

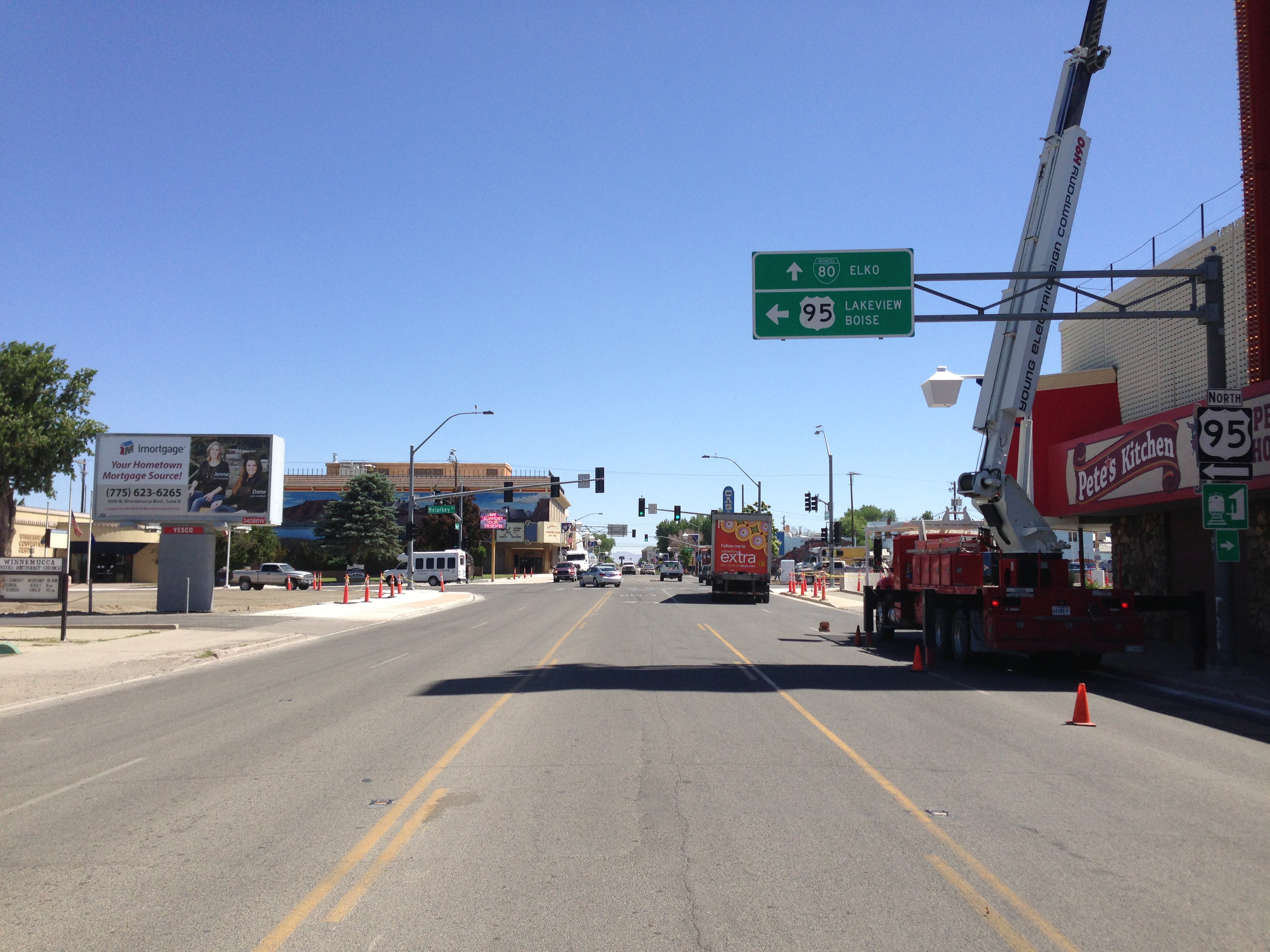
I-80 Bus./US 95 concurrency in Downtown Winnemucca as seen in 2014

=== Fallon to Winnemucca realignment ===
When U.S. Route 95 was designated through Nevada, it avoided using a shorter alignment between Winnemucca and Fallon. The northern segment of State Route 1A had been previously established running north from Fallon to connect with US 40 southwest of Lovelock. At the time, however, this portion of SR 1A was mostly an unimproved road. State Route 1A had been completely paved by 1959, and the US 95 designation was moved over it by 1960. This new alignment eliminated the need to drive west to Fernley and then double back eastward, shortening the highway's length by about 26 miles (42 km).

When US 95 was realigned, the former route via Fernley was redesignated as alternate route. This would be the second highway to bear this designation, as another U.S. Route 95 Alternate had been created between Schurz and Fernley years earlier. The two separate alternate routes would continue to meet in Fernley until circa 1978, when U.S. Route 50 Alternate replaced the section of US 95 Alternate (original US 95) heading east towards Fallon.

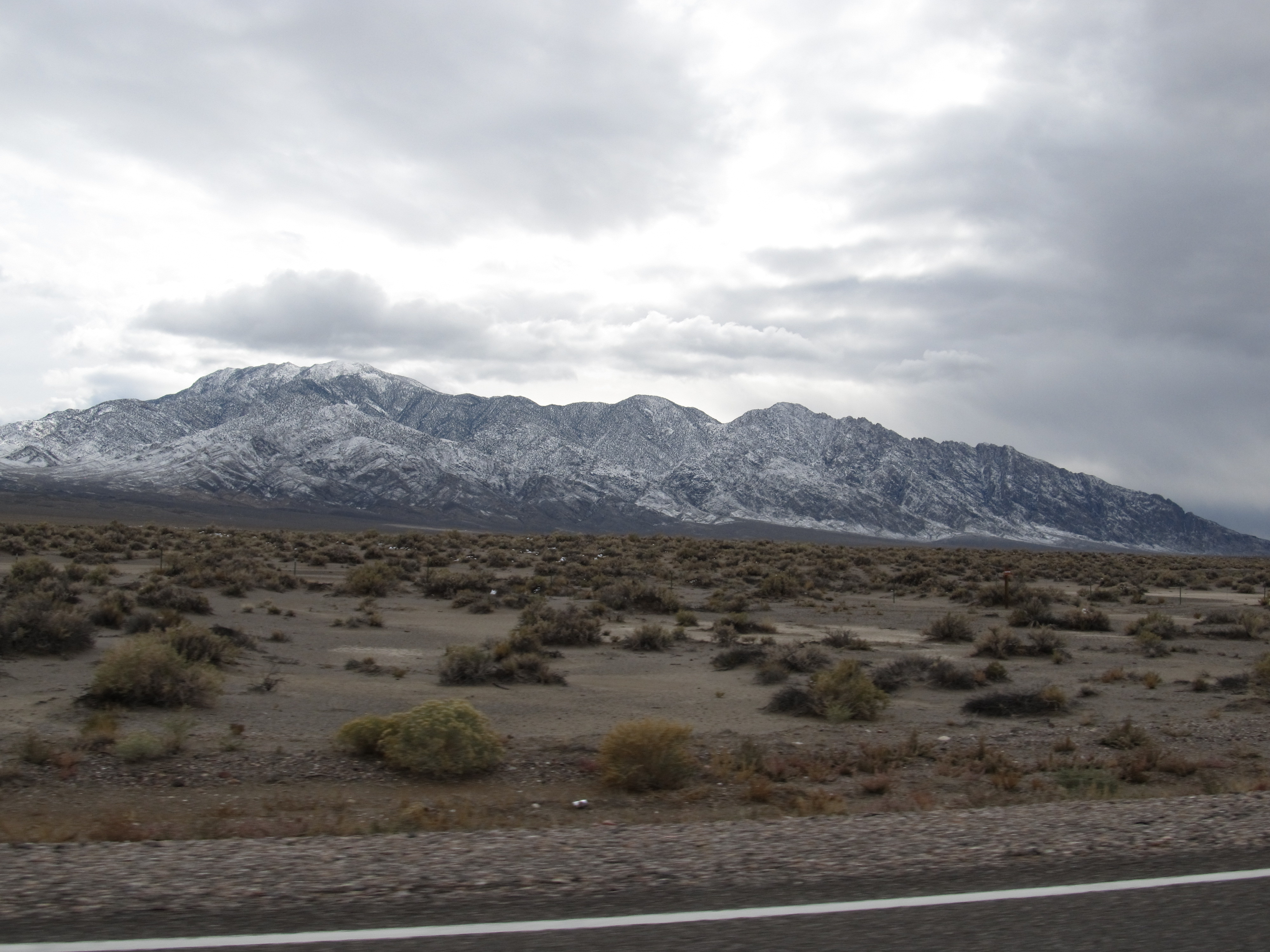
View from US 95 near Tonopah as seen in 2011

=== Improvements in the Las Vegas metro area ===
When US 95 was extended through the Las Vegas Valley around 1940, it used the existing roadways traversed by State Route 5. Crossing the valley from the southeast, the U.S. highway traveled along Boulder Highway (now SR 582) through Henderson and the town of Whitney. Reaching the city limits of Las Vegas, the road changed names to Fremont Street as it headed into downtown. The route followed Las Vegas Boulevard northward briefly before going west on Bonanza Road (now SR 579). US 95 finally turned northwest on Rancho Drive (now SR 599), which became the Tonopah Highway as it traveled northwest out of the Vegas valley. Over the years, this routing of US 95 along city streets would slowly be replaced with newer, high-speed facilities.

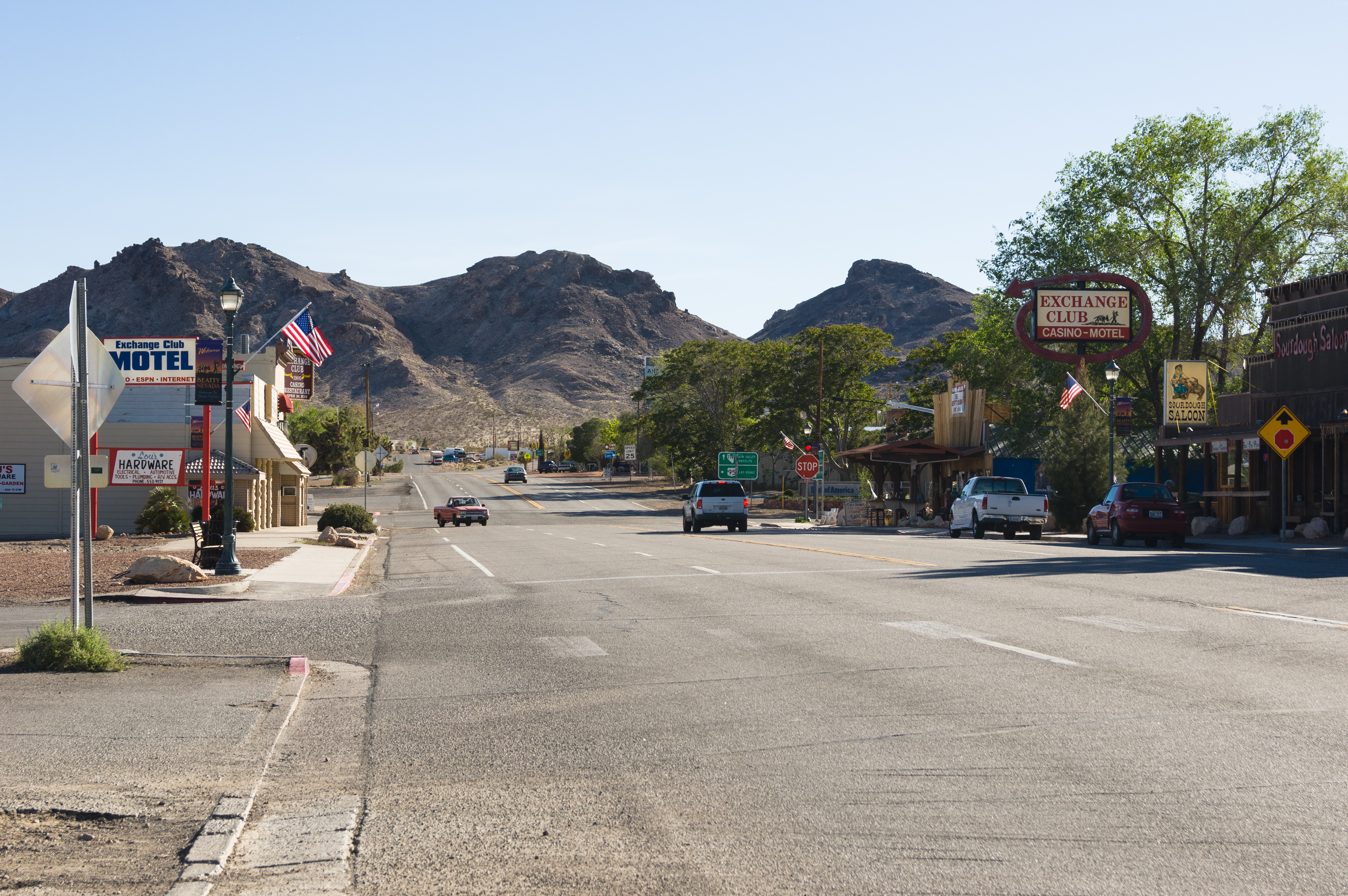
US 95 in Beatty as seen in 2012

==== Las Vegas Expressway ====
Elected in 1959, Las Vegas mayor Oran K. Gragson began advocating for regional street and planning initiatives in the growing Las Vegas Valley. In the early 1960s, Gragson had become instrumentally involved in planning what was then referred to as the "West Fremont Expressway". By 1968, the expressway was beginning to take shape, beginning Downtown at Las Vegas Boulevard, interchanging with Interstate 15 and spurring west toward Rancho Drive (present-day Exit 77).

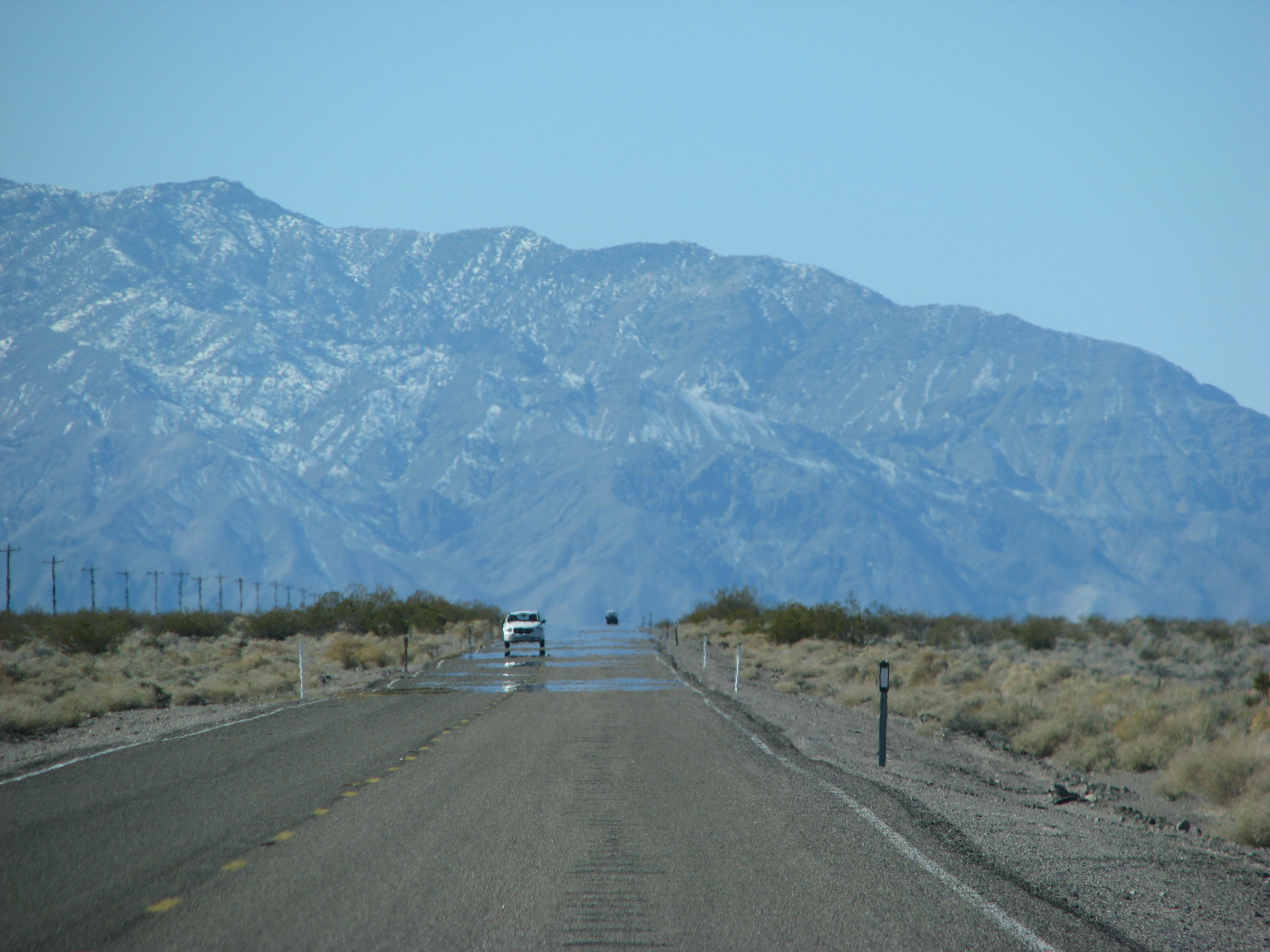
Northbound US 95 between Beatty and Scotty's Junction as seen in 2008

The Las Vegas Expressway was slowly constructed over the next decade, reaching west to Rainbow Boulevard by 1978. A northward extension, linking the expressway to the Tonopah Highway in Centennial Hills, was completed around 1980. By 1982, US 95 was rerouted from Rancho Drive to the completed expressway alignment. Also in 1982, as the result of a petition drive, the new US 95 expressway was renamed to the "Oran K. Gragson Expressway" in honor of the four-term mayor. The Nevada Department of Transportation now recognizes this portion of US 95 as the Oran K. Gragson Freeway.

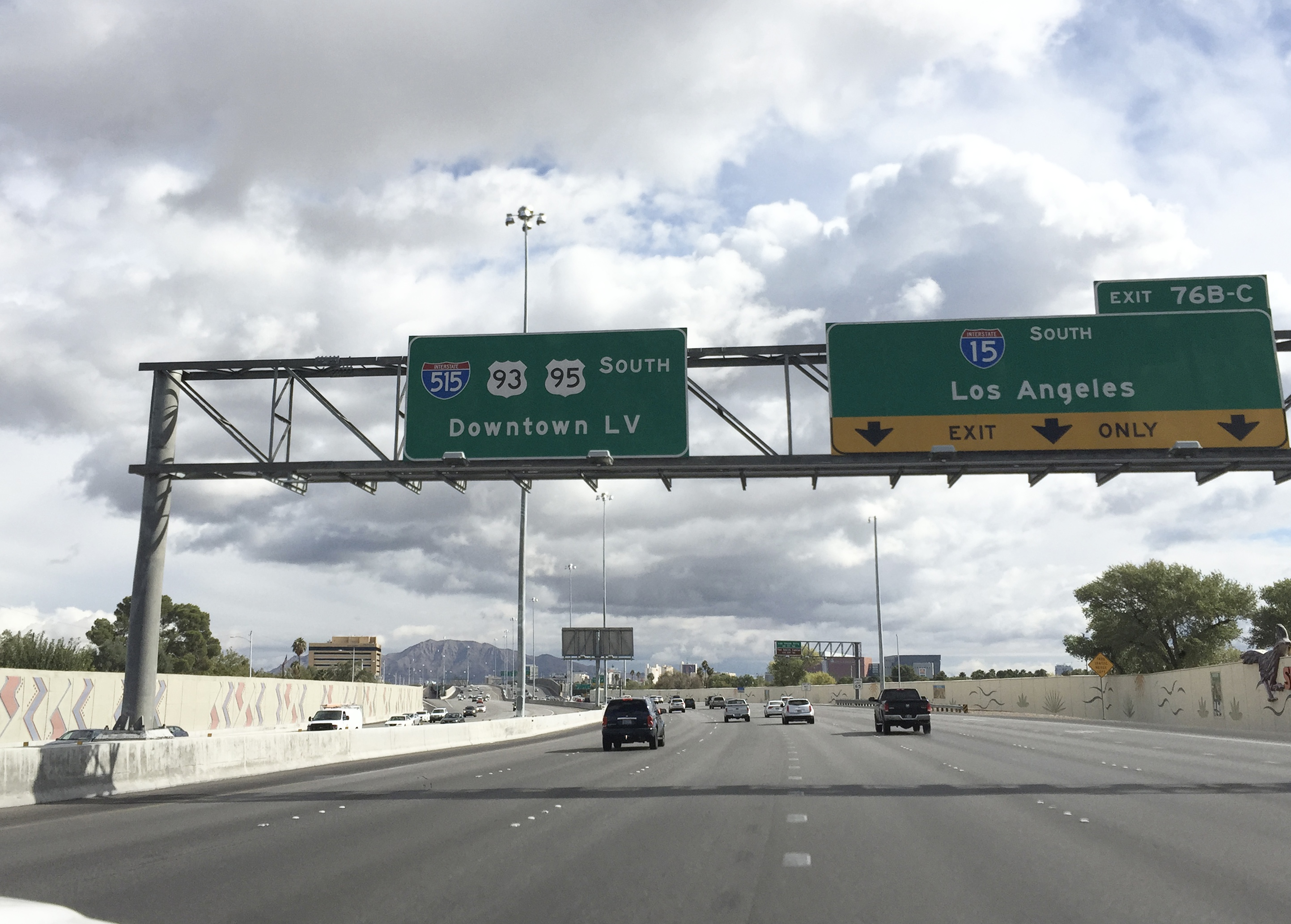
View south along U.S. Route 95 approaching I-15, I-515 and US 93 in Las Vegas as seen in 2015. I-515 was replaced by I-11 in 2024.

==== Henderson spur ====
The first part of the freeway to be opened that was not part of its 1968 route was the section between its then-eastern terminus (at Las Vegas Boulevard) and Charleston Boulevard, in 1984. It was extended south to Boulder Highway (at current exit 70) by 1986. US 95 was moved from Las Vegas Boulevard, Fremont Street, and Boulder Highway onto the new freeway at that time. As additional sections of freeway were completed, both US 95 and the concurrently-routed US 93 were rerouted onto the new freeway. The former alignment on Fremont Street and Boulder Highway became SR 582. Over time, parts of it have been decommissioned by the state and turned over to local entities for maintenance.

In May 2006, the (freeway-to-freeway) interchange was completed to replace the former diamond junction at Lake Mead Parkway/SR 564 (formerly known as Lake Mead Drive) and I-215. The interchange at Galleria Drive (exit 64B) was opened on November 4, 2009, resulting in the renumbering of the existing junction at Sunset Road (from exit 64 to exit 64A).

On August 16, 2017, Interstate 11 was opened to the public as the Boulder City Bypass. US 95 between Paradise Hills Drive and Cascata Drive was rerouted onto the newly built freeway. Some portions of the old highway near Railroad Pass Hotel and Casino were repurposed as parking aisles for said hotel. The portion of former US 95 between present-day US 93 Business and I-11 was redesignated SR 173, while retaining the name "Veterans Memorial Highway".

==== Earthquake ====
On May 15, 2020, the Monte Cristo Range earthquake damaged the highway in both directions from US 6 in Coaldale to SR 360 in Mineral County.

== Future ==
Future Interstate 11
- Location: Las Vegas – Fernley
- Length: 395.807 mi (636.990 km)

US 95 is part of a proposed northwestward extension of Interstate 11 (I-11) from Las Vegas. The interstate highway would primarily follow the US 95 corridor through central and northwestern Nevada, extending to I-80 and US 95 Alt. in Fernley near Reno and Sparks via Tonopah. In 2018, the Nevada Department of Transportation had initiated public outreach regarding its long-range planning efforts to narrow down options for the future I-11 corridor.

On June 20, 2022, NDOT decided that I-11 would follow the I-515/US 93/US 95 corridor through Las Vegas and then run concurrent with US 95 to the interchange with SR 157.

== Major intersections ==
Note: Mileposts in Nevada reset at county lines. The start and end mileposts for each county are given in the county column.

County	Location	mi	km	Exit	Destinations	Notes
Clark; CL 0.00–132.14	Palm Gardens	0	0.0		US 95 south – Needles	Continuation into California
Clark; CL 0.00–132.14	Palm Gardens	1	1.6		SR 163 east (Laughlin Highway) – Laughlin, Davis Dam	Western terminus of SR 163
Clark; CL 0.00–132.14	Searchlight	20	32		SR 164 west (Nipton Road) / Cottonwood Cove Road – Nipton, Cottonwood Cove	Eastern terminus of SR 164
Clark; CL 0.00–132.14	Boulder City	46	74		SR 165 east (Nelson Road) – Nelson	Western terminus of SR 165
Clark; CL 0.00–132.14	Boulder City				I-11 south / US 93 south / SR 173 north to US 93 Bus. – Kingman, Phoenix, Boulder City	Interchange; southern end of I-11/US 93 concurrency; southern terminus of SR 173; SR 173 north was formerly part of US 95 north; I-11 exit 14
Clark; CL 0.00–132.14	Boulder City			Southern end of freeway		
Clark; CL 0.00–132.14	Boulder City to Las Vegas			US 95 concurrent with I-11 and US 93 (I-11 exits 14 to 23 and I-11/US 95 exits 62 to 76)		
Clark; CL 0.00–132.14	Las Vegas			US 95 concurrent with I-11 (I-11/US 95 exits 76 to 96)		
Clark; CL 0.00–132.14	Las Vegas	92.3	148.5	96	SR 157 west (Kyle Canyon Road) / Sunstone Parkway – Mount Charleston I-11 ends	Diverging diamond interchange; current northern terminus of I-11; eastern terminus of SR 157
Clark; CL 0.00–132.14	Las Vegas Paiute Indian Reservation	95.6	153.9	99	Snow Mountain Reservation (Nu-Wav Kaiv Boulevard / Paiute Drive)	Diamond interchange
Clark; CL 0.00–132.14	Corn Creek	101.6	163.5	Current northern end of freeway; planned freeway extension via I-11 to I-80 / US 95 Alt. in Fernley near Reno and Sparks		
Clark; CL 0.00–132.14	Corn Creek	101.6	163.5		Corn Creek Road – Corn Creek	Proposed interchange as part of I-11 extension
Clark; CL 0.00–132.14	Tule Springs Fossil Beds National Monument	106.0	170.6		SR 156 west (Lee Canyon Road) – Lee Canyon, Mount Charleston	Proposed interchange as part of I-11 extension; eastern terminus of SR 156
Clark; CL 0.00–132.14	Indian Springs	111.5	179.4		Cold Creek Road – Cold Creek	Proposed interchange as part of I-11 extension
Nye; NY 0.00–107.22	Mercury	6.0	9.7		Mercury (Mercury Highway)	Interchange; proposed interchange upgrade as part of I-11 extension; restricted area; serves Nevada National Security Sites
Nye; NY 0.00–107.22		14	23		SR 160 east (Pahrump Valley Highway) – Pahrump	Proposed interchange as part of I-11 extension; western terminus of SR 160
Nye; NY 0.00–107.22	Amargosa Valley	30	48		SR 373 south (Death Valley Junction Road) – Death Valley Junction	Northern terminus of SR 373
Nye; NY 0.00–107.22	Beatty	60	97		SR 374 south (Death Valley Road, Main Street) – Rhyolite, Death Valley	Northern terminus of SR 374; serves Death Valley National Park
Nye; NY 0.00–107.22	Scotty's Junction	95	153		SR 267 west (Scotty's Castle Road) – Scotty's Castle	Proposed interchange as part of I-11 extension; eastern terminus of SR 267; serves Death Valley National Park
Esmeralda; ES 0.00–44.19	Lida Junction	4	6.4		SR 266 west (Lida Road) – Lida	Proposed interchange as part of I-11 extension; eastern terminus of SR 266
Esmeralda; ES 0.00–44.19	Goldfield				Silver Peak Road – Alkali, Silver Peak, Blair	Proposed interchange as part of I-11 extension
Nye; NY 107.22–108.44; NY 1.80–0.00 (US 6)	Tonopah	108.44 1.80	174.52 2.90		US 6 east (Grand Army of the Republic Highway, Theodore Roosevelt Highway) – Austin, Ely	Southern end of US 6 concurrency; US 95 mileposts begin using US 6 distance
Esmeralda; ES 57.74–19 (US 6); ES 85.40–99.08	Blair Junction	25	40		SR 265 south (Silver Peak Road) – Blair, Silver Peak, Alkali	Proposed interchange as part of I-11 extension; northern terminus of SR 265
Esmeralda; ES 57.74–19 (US 6); ES 85.40–99.08	Coaldale	19 85.40	31 137.44		US 6 west (Grand Army of the Republic Highway, Theodore Roosevelt Highway) – Bishop	Proposed interchange as part of I-11 extension; northern end of US 6 concurrency; US 95 mileposts end using US 6 distance
Mineral; MI 0.00–92.56		7	11		SR 360 south (Mina–Basalt Cutoff Road) – Bishop	Proposed interchange as part of I-11 extension; northern terminus of SR 360
Mineral; MI 0.00–92.56	Luning	25.36	40.81		SR 361 north (Gabbs Valley Road) – Gabbs	Proposed interchange as part of I-11 extension; southern terminus of SR 361
Mineral; MI 0.00–92.56	Hawthorne	49.00	78.86		US 95 Truck north (Freedom Road)	Hazardous material route around Hawthorne; southern terminus of US 95 Truck/SR 362
Mineral; MI 0.00–92.56	Hawthorne	50	80		SR 359 south (E Street, Pole Line Road) – Lee Vining, Bridgeport	Northern terminus of SR 359
Mineral; MI 0.00–92.56	Hawthorne	50	80		US 95 Truck south (Freedom Road)	Hazardous material route around Hawthorne; northern terminus of US 95 Truck/SR 362
Mineral; MI 0.00–92.56	Schurz	83.16	133.83		US 95 Alt. north – Yerington, Carson City, Reno	Proposed interchange as part of I-11 extension; southern terminus of US 95 Alt.
Lyon; LY 0.00–2.82	No major junctions					
Churchill; CH 0.00–59.02		17	27		Pasture Road (SR 120 east)	Proposed interchange as part of I-11 extension; western terminus of SR 120
Churchill; CH 0.00–59.02		21	34		Lone Tree Road (SR 718 west)	Eastern terminus of SR 718
Churchill; CH 0.00–59.02		21	34		Berney Road (SR 119 east)	Western terminus of SR 119
Churchill; CH 0.00–59.02		22	35		Union Lane (SR 720 east) – Naval Air Station Fallon	Western terminus of SR 720
Churchill; CH 0.00–59.02	Fallon	25.07	40.35		SR 117 west (Sheckler Road)	Eastern terminus of SR 117
Churchill; CH 0.00–59.02	Fallon	26	42		US 50 west (East Williams Avenue, Lincoln Highway) – Carson City, Reno	Southern end of US 50 concurrency; former US 95 north/US 95 Alt. north
Churchill; CH 0.00–59.02	Fallon				US 50 east (East Williams Avenue, Lincoln Highway) – Ely	Northern end of US 50 concurrency
Churchill; CH 0.00–59.02					Old River Road (SR 726 east)	Western terminus of SR 726
Churchill; CH 0.00–59.02	Trinity	59.02	94.98		I-80 west (Dwight D. Eisenhower Highway, Purple Heart Trail) / US 95 Alt. south – Reno	Interchange; southern end of I-80 concurrency; former US 95 south; I-80 exit 83
Churchill; CH 0.00–59.02	Trinity	59.02	94.98	Southern end of freeway		
Churchill to Humboldt	Trinity to Winnemucca			US 95 concurrent with I-80 (exits 83 to 176)		
Humboldt; HU 0.00–73.76	Winnemucca			Northern end of freeway		
Humboldt; HU 0.00–73.76	Winnemucca				I-80 east (Dwight D. Eisenhower Highway, Purple Heart Trail) – Elko	Interchange; northern end of I-80 concurrency; southern end of I-80 BL concurrency; I-80 exit 176
Humboldt; HU 0.00–73.76	Winnemucca				Hanson Street (SR 787 east)	Western terminus of SR 787
Humboldt; HU 0.00–73.76	Winnemucca				I-80 BL east (East Winnemucca Boulevard) / SR 289 east – Elko	Northern end of I-80 BL concurrency; western terminus of SR 289
Humboldt; HU 0.00–73.76	Winnemucca				SR 795 south (Reinhart Lane)	Northern terminus of SR 795
Humboldt; HU 0.00–73.76	Paradise Hill				SR 290 north (Paradise Valley Road) – Paradise Valley	Southern terminus of SR 290
Humboldt; HU 0.00–73.76					SR 140 west (Denio Road, Adel/Oregon Road) – Denio, Lakeview	Eastern terminus of SR 140
Humboldt; HU 0.00–73.76	Orovada				SR 293 west (Kings River Valley Road) – Kings River Valley	Eastern terminus of SR 293
Humboldt; HU 0.00–73.76	McDermitt	73.76	118.71		US 95 north (ION Highway) – Boise	Continuation into Oregon
1.000 mi = 1.609 km; 1.000 km = 0.621 mi: Concurrency terminus; HOV only; Incomplete access

== Special routes ==
- U.S. Route 95 Alternate, an alternate route beginning in Schurz serving Yerington, Silver Springs and Fernley
- U.S. Route 95 Business, a business route in Las Vegas
- U.S. Route 95 Truck, a truck bypass of Hawthorne

== See also ==
- List of U.S. Routes in Nevada
- Carson and Colorado Railway
- Las Vegas and Tonopah Railroad
- Tonopah and Goldfield Railroad

U.S. Route 95
Previous state: California	Nevada	Next state: Oregon
