= Interstate 80 Business (Winnemucca, Nevada) =

Interstate business route in Nevada, USA

Interstate 80 Business
- Winnemucca Boulevard

Route information
- Business route of I-80
- Maintained by NDOT
- Length: 4.4 mi (7.1 km)
- Existed: 1982–present

Major junctions
- West end: I-80 / US 95 in Winnemucca
- US 95 in Winnemucca
- East end: I-80 northeast of Winnemucca

Location
- Country: United States
- State: Nevada
- Counties: Humboldt

Highway system
- Interstate Highway System; Main; Auxiliary; Suffixed; Business; Future; Nevada State Highway System; Interstate; US; State; Pre‑1976; Scenic

Interstate 80 Business (I-80 Bus) is an Interstate business route in Humboldt County, Nevada. Serving the city of Winnemucca along Winnemucca Boulevard, I-80 Bus is also cosigned along portions of three other state highways through the city:

- US Route 95 (US 95) from Interstate 80 (I-80) exit 176 to Melarkey Street.
- State Route 289 (SR 289) from US 95 at Melarkey Street to East Second Street.
- SR 794 from SR 289 at East Second Street to I-80 exit 180.

== Route description ==
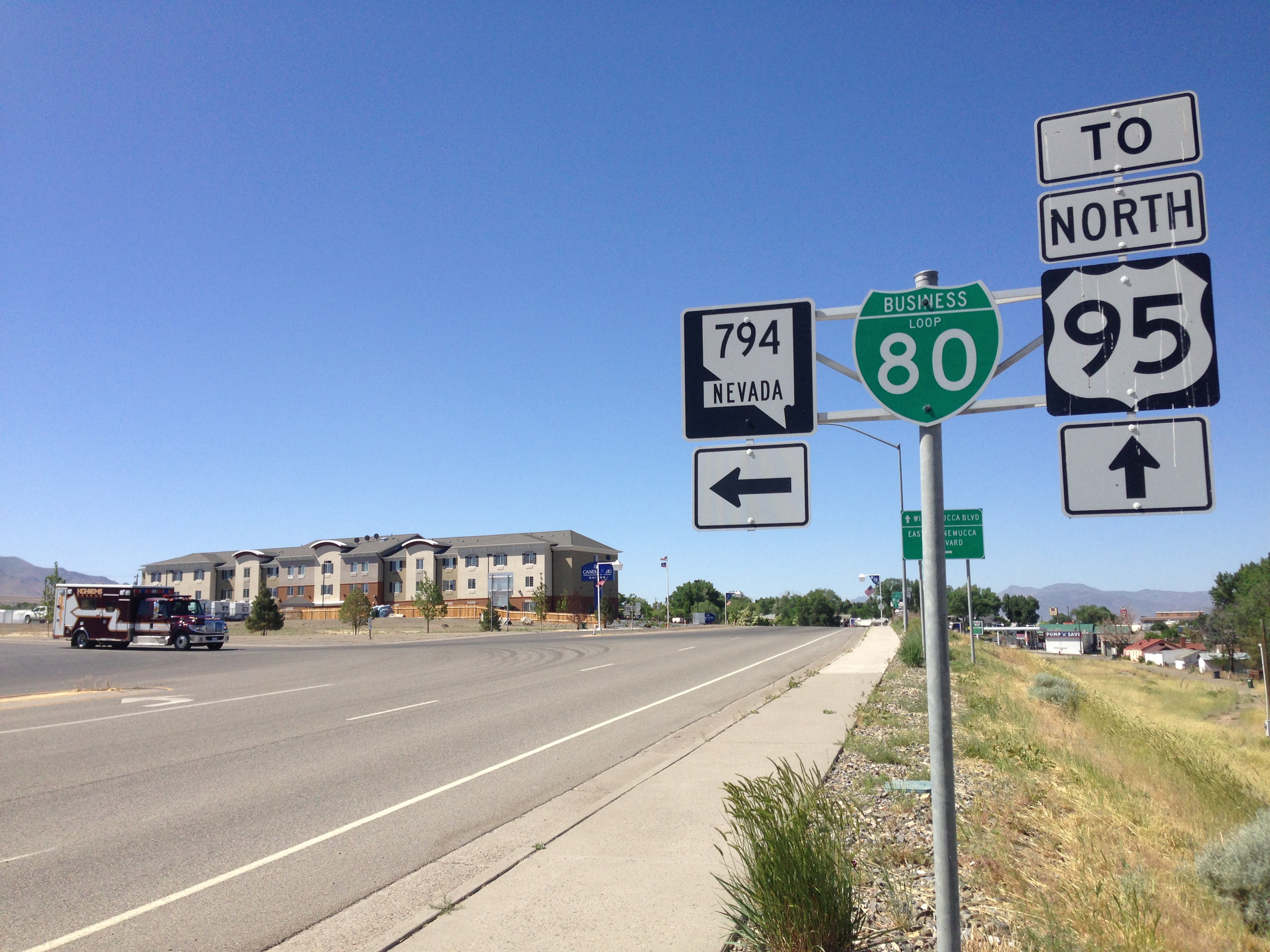
View south along SR 289 at SR 794 in Winnemucca. Note no directional signage for I-80 Bus. This is because I-80 Bus follows both SR 794 east (to the left) and SR 289 south (straight ahead) from this intersection.

I-80 Bus starts south of the incorporated city at exit 176 on I-80/US 95. The highway heads northeast concurrent with US 95 and parallel to US 80 and a railway through Winnemucca. Traveling further north, the route gets to an intersection with Melarkey Street, where US 95 leaves I-80 Bus and runs north under I-80. At this intersection, the business loop now runs concurrently with SR 289 until it branches off to the east, and SR 289 continues to the northeast under I-80. Over the final stretch from this intersection to its eastern terminus at exit 180 on I-80, I-80 Bus runs concurrently with SR 794, also named East Winnemucca Boulevard.

== History ==
The I-80 Bus designation was first approved by the American Association of State Highway and Transportation Officials (AASHTO) at its spring meeting on June 28, 1982.

== Major intersections ==
The entire route is in Humboldt County.

Location	mi	km	Destinations	Notes
Winnemucca	0.0	0.0	West Winnemucca Boulevard	Continuation beyond western terminus
Winnemucca	0.0	0.0	I-80 / US 95 south – Elko, Reno	Interchange; western end of US 95 concurrency; I-80 exit 176
Winnemucca	1.2	1.9	Hanson Street (SR 787 east)	
Winnemucca	1.6	2.6	US 95 north / Melarkey Street – Boise	Eastern end of US 95 concurrency; western end of SR 289 concurrency
Winnemucca	2.1	3.4	SR 289 north (East Second Street) to I-80 – Reno, Elko	Eastern end of SR 289 concurrency; western end of SR 794 concurrency
	4.4	7.1	I-80 – Elko, Reno	Interchange; eastern end of SR 794 concurrency; I-80 exit 180
	4.4	7.1	Pedroli Avenue	Continuation beyond eastern terminus
1.000 mi = 1.609 km; 1.000 km = 0.621 mi: Concurrency terminus

== See also ==
- Business routes of Interstate 80
