= Alkali, Nevada =

- Ghost town
- Location within Nevada Location within the United States
- Coordinates: 37°49′33″N 117°20′15″W
- Country: United States
- State: Nevada
- County: Esmeralda County
- Elevation: 5,000 ft (1,500 m)

Alkali is a ghost town located in Esmeralda County, Nevada. Alkali is the site of Alkali Hot Spring, which was operated as a spa by Geni and Joe Guisti in the 1930s. During Goldfield's peak, the site included an indoor wooden swimming pool with a separate area for children and a large building containing a dining room, kitchen, dance hall and bar. In front of the dining room were tall tamarisk trees and a large picnic table where visitors could either order from the dining room or bring their own lunches. The Guisti residence was at the rear of the dining room. Friday and Saturday night dances were attended by Tonopah residents.

The waters of the spring originally appeared as a series of small seeps. In the early 1900s, Consolidated Mines Co. created a 40-foot adit to collect the seeps in to a single flow. At the time, the water was pumped about 10 miles (16 km) to the Combination Mill at Goldfield. The adit entrance temperature was reported to be 140 °F (60 °C). A Goldfield resident stated that the source of the spring is under the defunct powerhouse. The spring is reported to contain lithium, though the surface of nearby Alkali Flat (Alkali Lake) does not.

In 2018, RAM Power held a geothermal leases near Alkali Hot Spring.
