= Paradise Valley, Nevada =

- Census-designated place
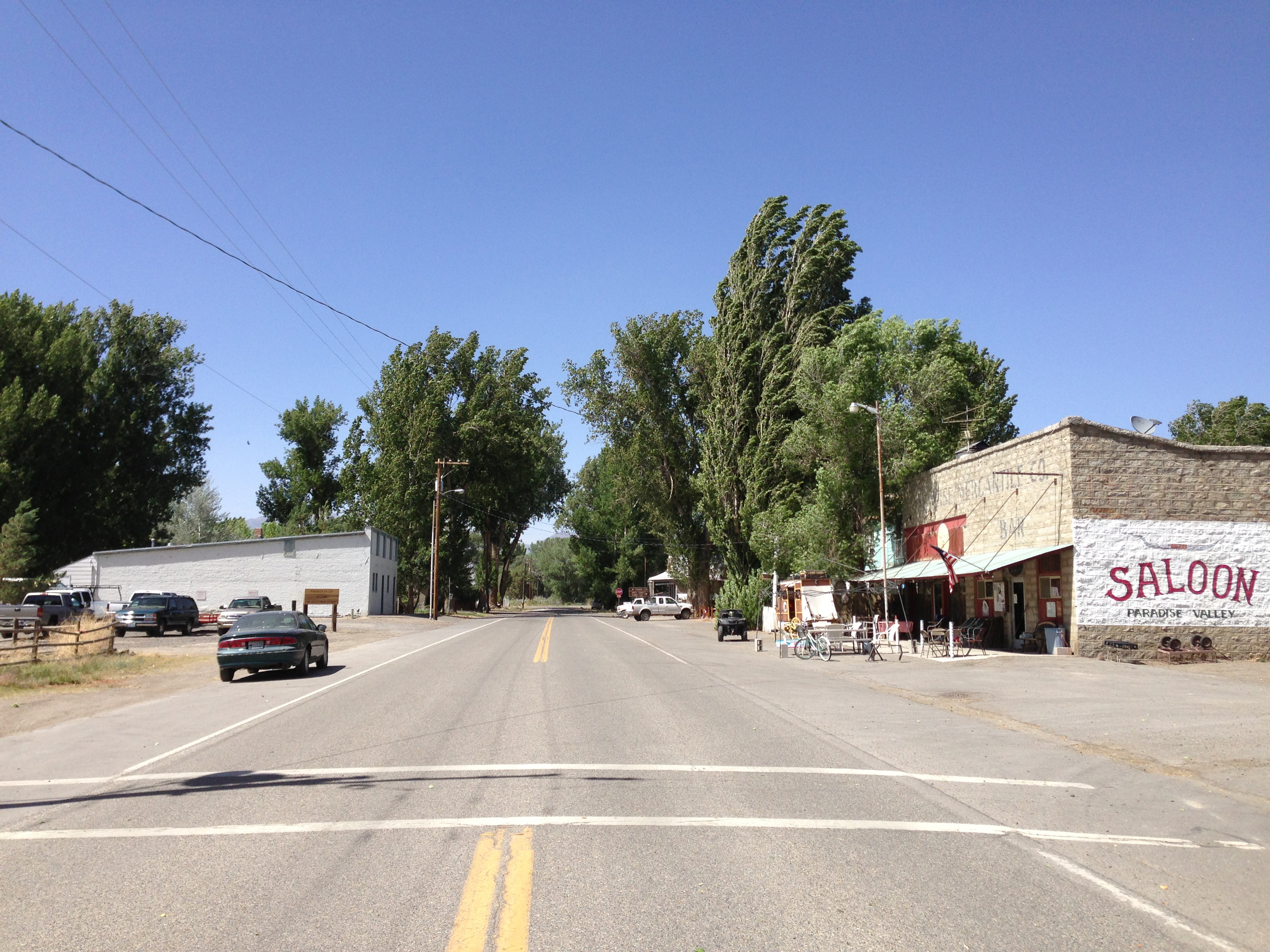

- Location within the state of Nevada Paradise Valley (the United States)
- Coordinates: 41°29′35″N 117°31′59″W
- Country: United States
- State: Nevada
- County: Humboldt

Area
  - Total: 3.43 sq mi (8.88 km^{2})
  - Land: 3.42 sq mi (8.87 km^{2})
  - Water: 0.0039 sq mi (0.01 km^{2})
- Elevation: 4,557 ft (1,389 m)

Population (2020)
  - Total: 71
  - Density: 21/sq mi (8/km^{2})
- Time zone: UTC-8 (Pacific (PST))
  - Summer (DST): UTC-7 (PDT)
- ZIP code: 89426
- FIPS code: 32-55400
- GNIS feature ID: 2583950

Nevada Historical Marker
- Reference no.: 89

Paradise Valley is a census-designated place (CDP) in Humboldt County, Nevada, United States, near the Santa Rosa Ranger District of Humboldt National Forest. It is located at the northern terminus of Nevada State Route 290, about 19 miles (31 km) northeast of U.S. Route 95 and a total of 40 miles (64 km) north of Winnemucca. The town is located in a broad valley, with the Santa Rosa Range of mountains just to the northwest. As of the 2020 census, Paradise Valley had a population of 71.

== History ==
A post office has been in operation at Paradise Valley since 1871. According to tradition, in the 1860s, a prospector declared "What a paradise!" upon seeing the valley, after having traveled through the surrounding arid territory.

== Demographics ==
Historical population
Census	Pop.	Note	%±
2020	71		—
U.S. Decennial Census

As of the census of 2010, there were 109 people, 51 households, and 35 families residing in the CDP. There were 92 housing units. The racial makeup of the CDP was 89.0% White, 1.8% Native American, 6.4% some other race, and 2.8% from two or more races. 18.3% of the population were Hispanic or Latino of any race.

== Paradise Valley Folklife Project ==
The American Folklife Center of the U.S. Library of Congress conducted extensive ethnographic field research in Paradise Valley from 1978 to 1982. The Paradise Valley Folklife Project generated a multi-format resource collection documenting the history and culture of the area's ranching community. A team of fieldworkers from AFC documented the distinct ethnic groups in the area (Apache, Anglo, Basque, Chinese, German, Italian and Northern Paiute); the history of the region, including archaeological remains of a Chinese community, foodways, and oral traditions. The resulting material was subsequently packaged by the Library of Congress into a collection titled "Buckaroos in Paradise: Ranching Culture in Northern Nevada, 1945-1982". The collection includes 32 boxes of archival material including manuscripts, audio and video recordings, and several thousand photographic prints and negatives from the AFC project and additional historical archives dating back to 1870. The project was initiated by the American Folklife Center in cooperation with the Smithsonian Institution in 1978.

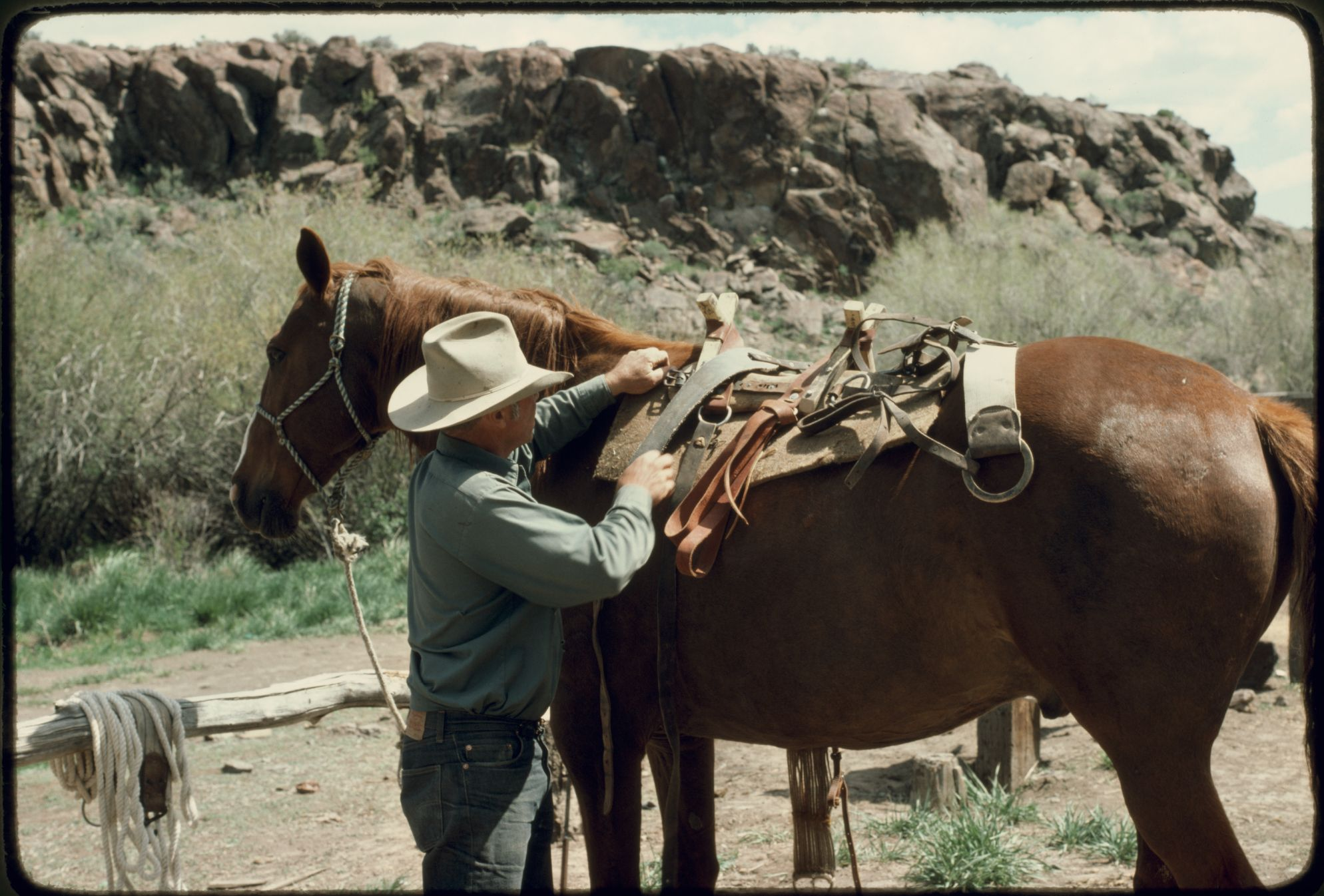
Pack saddle horse on the Grayson Ranch

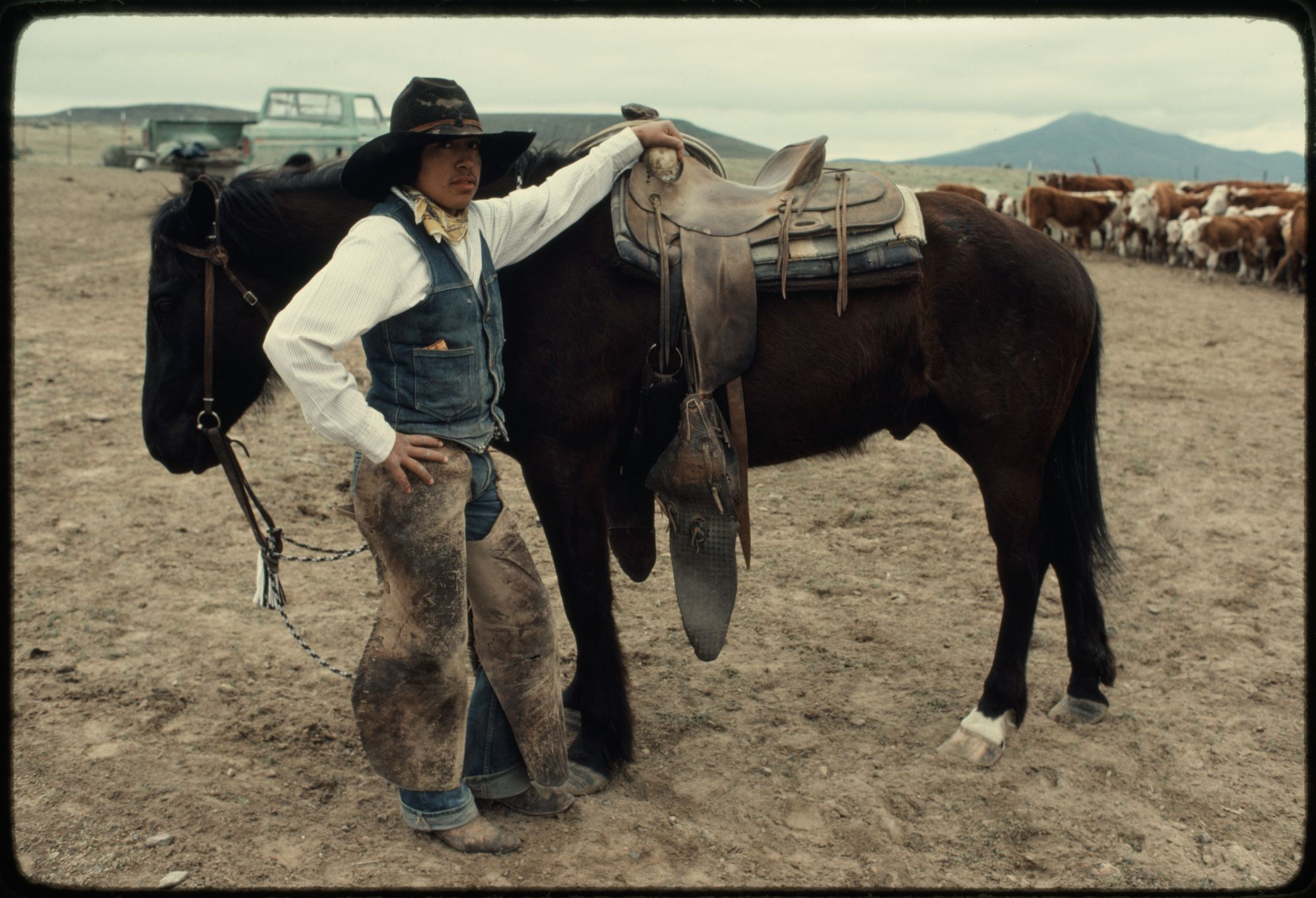
Branding on the Ninety-Six Ranch

== Education ==
Humboldt County School District serves the community.

The sole school in Paradise Valley is the Paradise Valley School, which serves Kindergarten through eighth grade.

Paradise Valley School had 27 students in the 1963-1964 school year.

== In popular culture ==
Trapper and self-styled mountain man Claude Dallas eluded capture for 15 months after killing two Idaho Fish & Game wardens in Idaho, near Paradise Valley, in 1981. After conviction, he escaped from prison in 1986 and, after almost a year, was recaptured in Riverside, California.

== Notable people ==
- Edna Purviance, actress
- Hazel Bell Wines, educator and state legislator
