= Nevada State Route 290 =

State highway in Nevada, United States

State Route 290
- Paradise Valley Road
- SR 290 highlighted in red

Route information
- Maintained by NDOT
- Length: 18.012 mi (28.988 km)
- Existed: July 1, 1976–present

Major junctions
- South end: US 95 north of Winnemucca
- North end: Bridge Street in Paradise Valley

Location
- Country: United States
- State: Nevada
- County: Humboldt

Highway system
- Nevada State Highway System; Interstate; US; State; Pre‑1976; Scenic
← SR 289	→ SR 292

State Route 290 (SR 290) is a state highway in Humboldt County, Nevada. It serves to connect U.S. Route 95 to the community of Paradise Valley. The road was originally established as State Route 8B by the early 1930s.

== Route description ==
State Route 290 begins at an intersection with US 95 approximately 22 miles (35 km) north of Winnemucca near the Santa Rosa Range. From the junction, the highway heads northeasterly through a valley known as Paradise Valley while paralleling Martin Creek, a fork of the Little Humboldt River. The road turns more northerly after about 12 miles (19 km) as it heads into the town of Paradise Valley. Once inside the town, SR 290 turns east on Bridge Street to come to its northern terminus on a small bridge over Big Cottonwood Creek.

== History ==
SR 290 was established as State Route 8B by 1932

SR 290 was originally numbered as State Route 8B. SR 8B had been established as a graveled road by 1932, approximately following the alignment of the present-day highway. The route was completely paved by 1940. No major changes were made to State Route 8B during its existence. The route number remained active until the renumbering of Nevada's state highways that began on July 1, 1976. SR 8B became the present-day State Route 290 in that process, a change first seen on the 1978–1979 version of the state's highway map.

== Major intersections ==
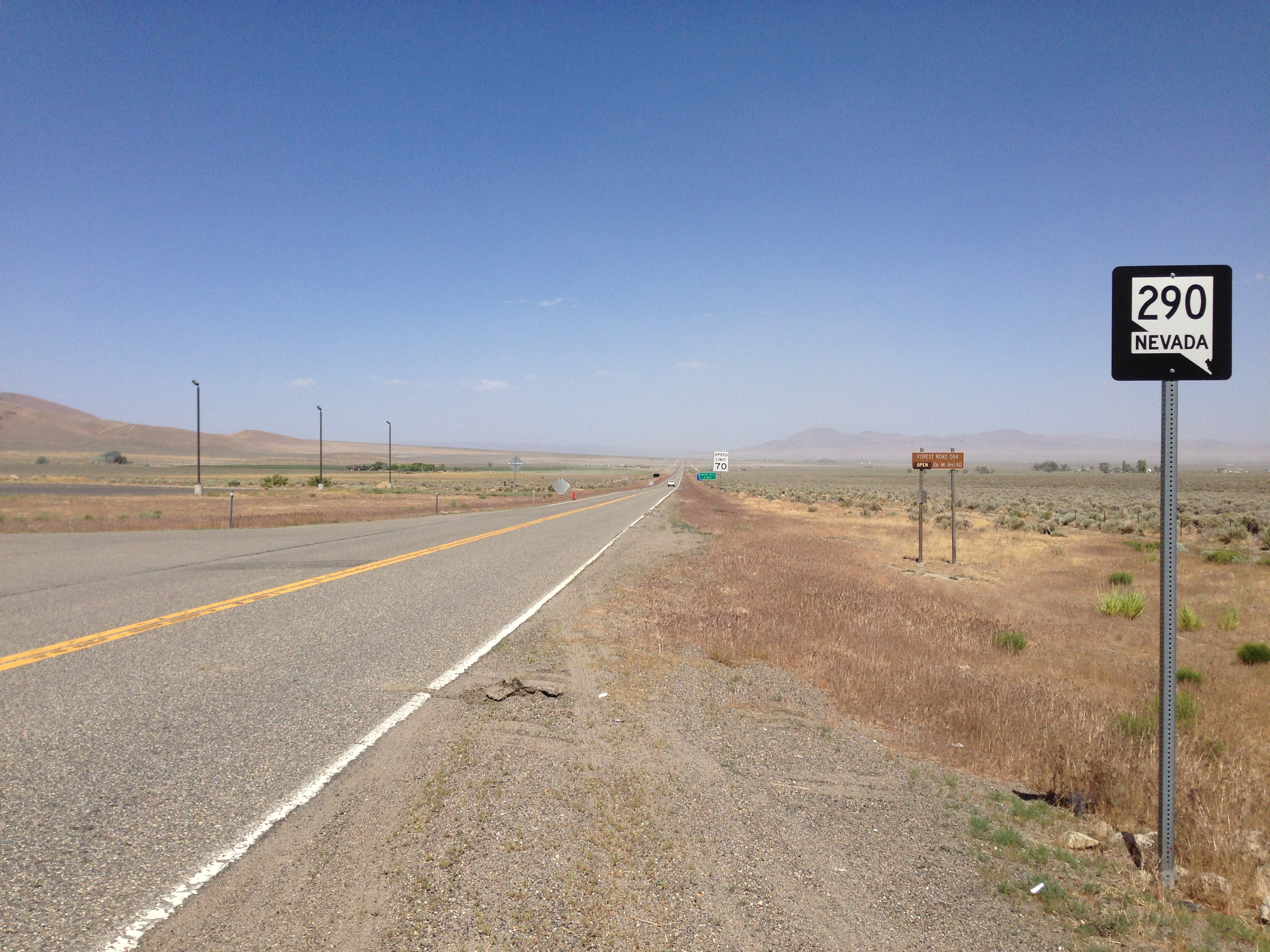
View from the south end of SR 290 looking northbound

The entire route is in Humboldt County.

Location	mi	km	Destinations	Notes
	0.000	0.000	US 95 – Winnemucca, McDermitt	
Paradise Valley	18.012	28.988	Bridge Street	
1.000 mi = 1.609 km; 1.000 km = 0.621 mi
