= Cold Creek, Nevada =

Unincorporated community in Nevada, US

Cold Creek
- Unincorporated community
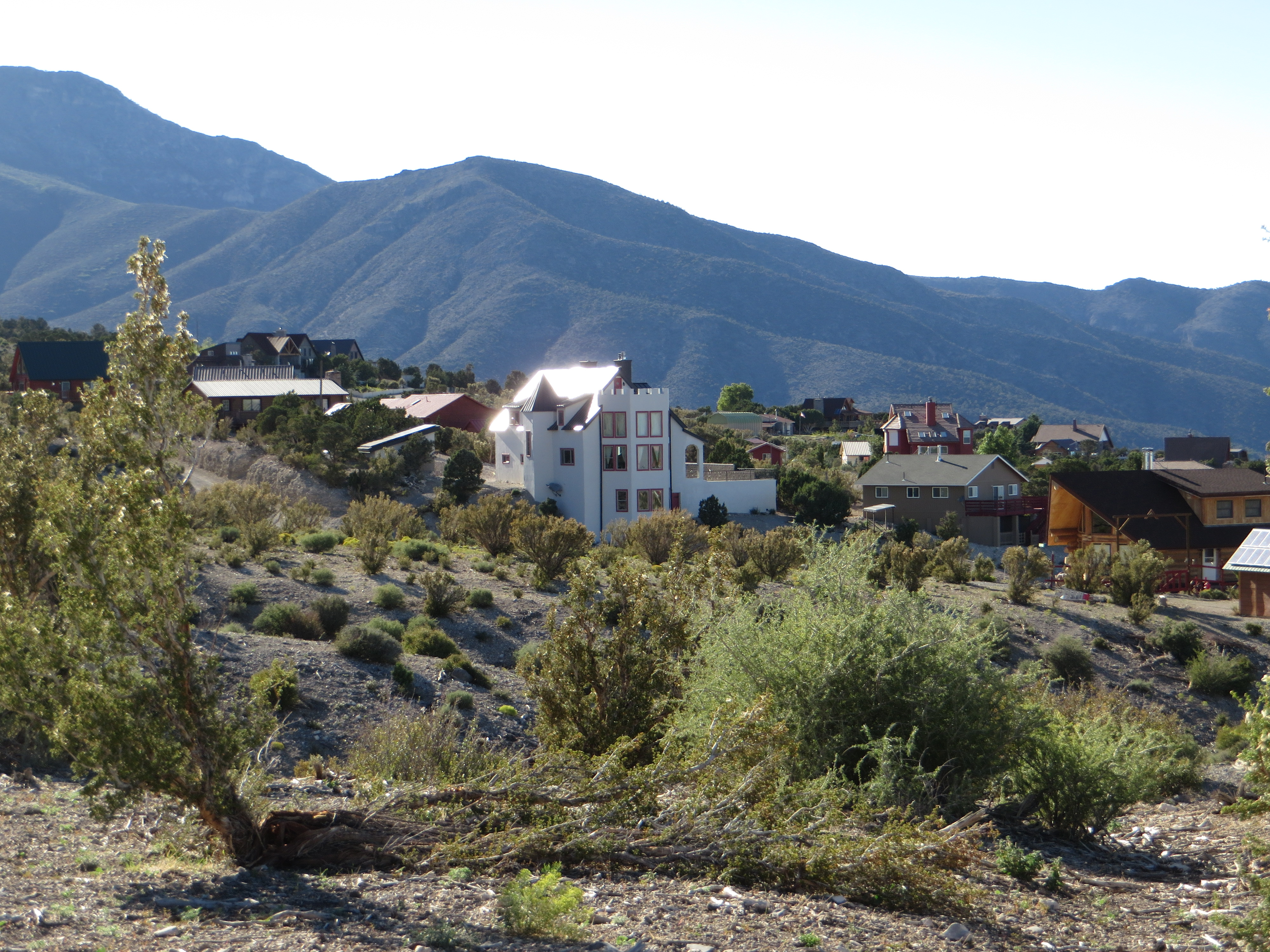
- Cold Creek, Nevada

- Location within Nevada Location within the United States
- Country: United States
- State: Nevada
- County: Clark
- Named after: Cold Creek
- Elevation: 4,803 ft (1,464 m)
- Time zone: UTC-8 (Pacific (PST))
  - Summer (DST): UTC-7 (PDT)
- ZIP code: 89124
- Area codes: 702/725
- GNIS feature ID: 859284
- Website: Official website

Cold Creek is an unincorporated community in Clark County, Nevada, United States located within the Spring Mountains National Recreation Area and approximately 28 miles by road from the Las Vegas city limits. Cold Creek is named for the stream that flows through the community.

Cold Creek is a popular community for residents of Las Vegas and nearby locations to purchase second homes, away from large cities. The community's isolated location provides little light pollution coming from Las Vegas at night. Cold Creek has a homeowners association.

== History ==
In the 1930s, Cold Creek served as a dude ranch called Cold Creek Ranch. Stacy Irvin, curator of education at the Nevada State Museum, says, “Dude ranches were popular after the law for quickie divorces was passed in Nevada. Women would stay there for six weeks in order to get Nevada residency and be eligible for a divorce." The ranch now exists as a historic site.

In June 1981, the Mack's Canyon Fire burned 6,500 acres of forest on Bonanza Peak, just southwest of Cold Creek. The scar caused by the wildfire is still visible, with only sparse vegetation and plant remains populating the area as of 2023.

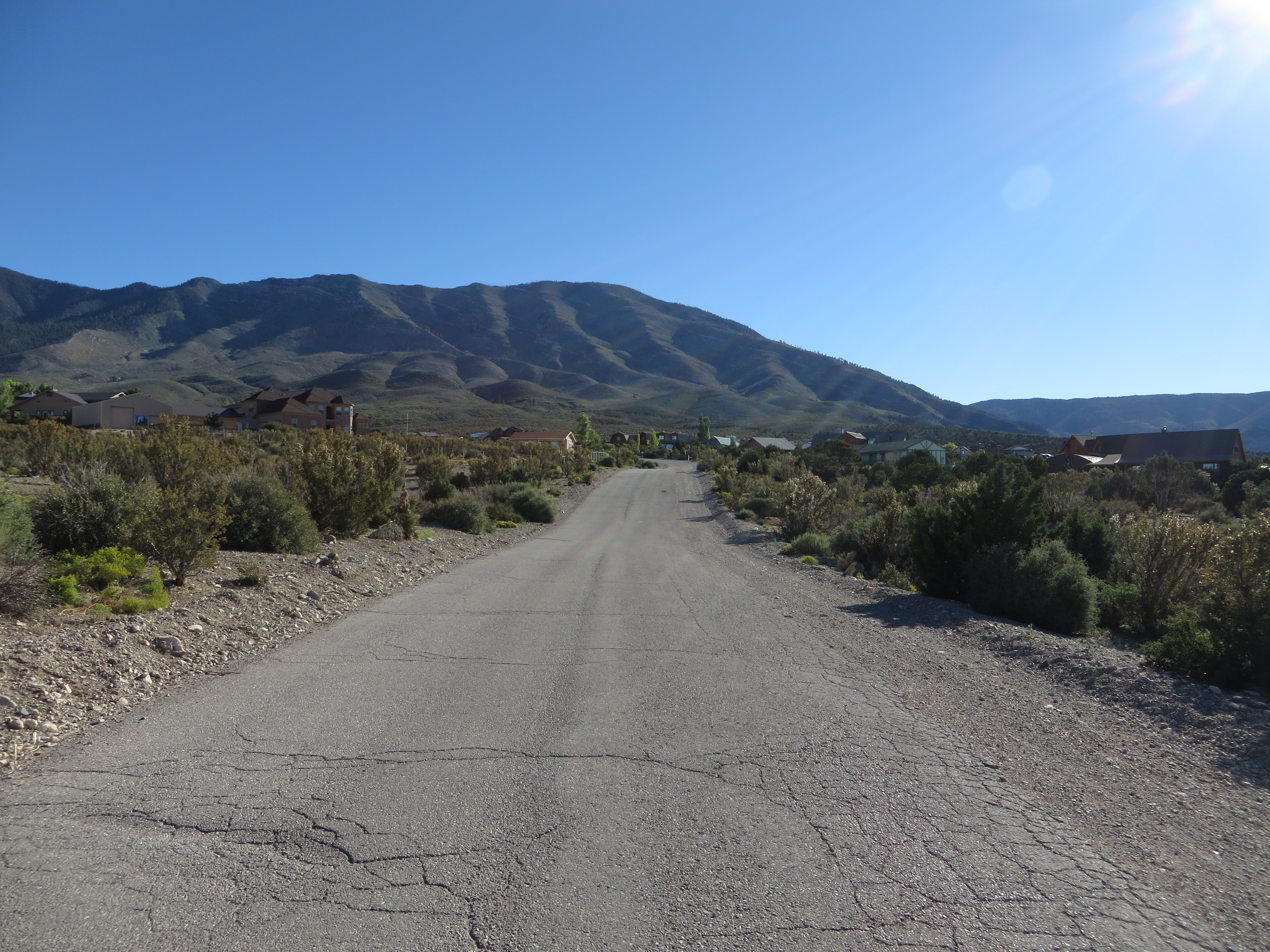
Cold Creek Road looking west

== Infrastructure ==
Cold Creek is served by the Clark County Fire Department with a fire station and has no commercial businesses. The community is primarily accessed by Cold Creek Road, a paved road which heads northeast from the community to intersect with U.S. Route 95 at the High Desert State Prison.

Cold Creek is an off-the-grid community and relies on power from solar panels.

== Wildlife ==
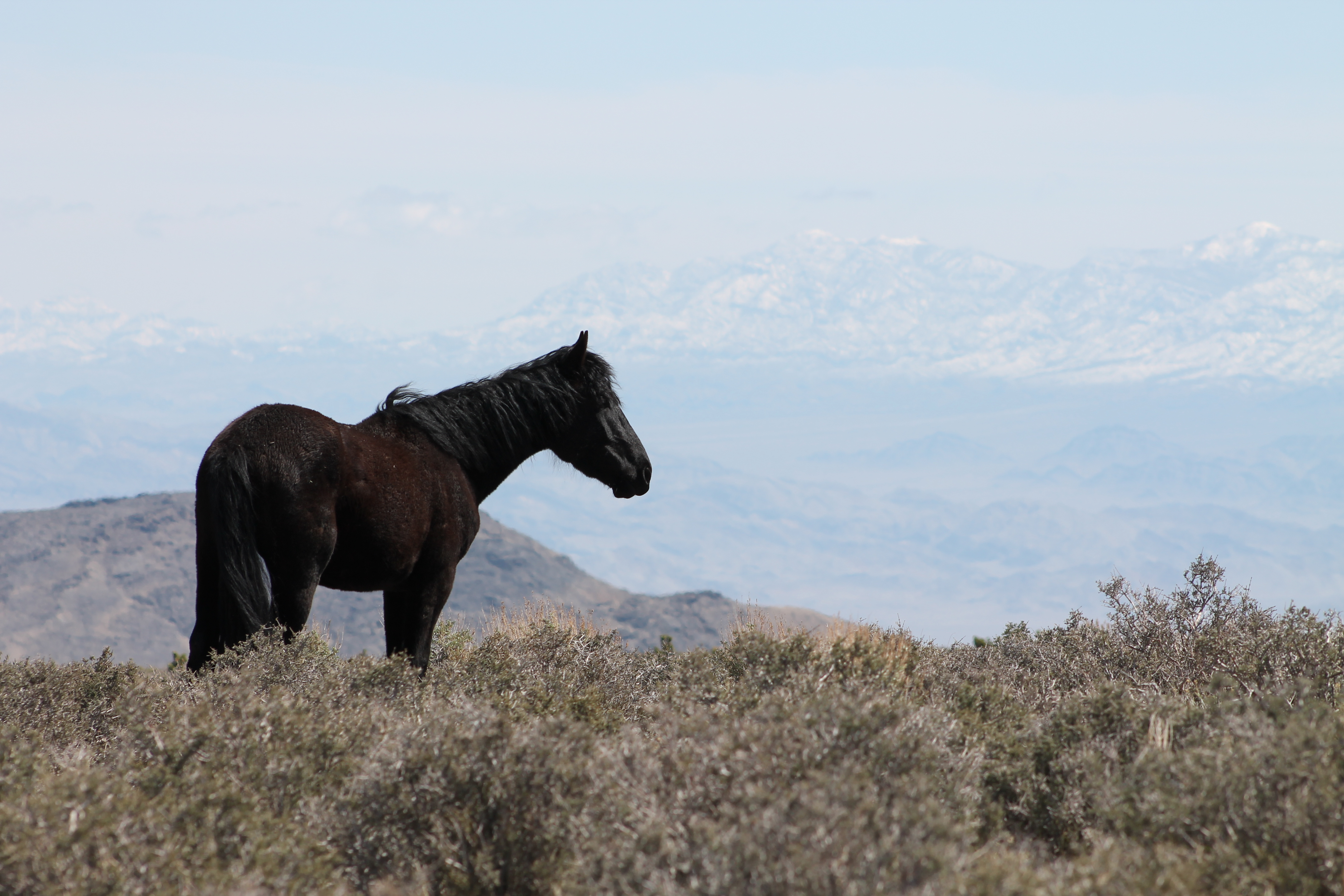
Wild mustang in Cold Creek

Located within the 275,575 acre Bureau of Land Management (BLM) Wheeler Pass Herd Management Area (HMA), the Cold Creek Herd is one of the final remaining wild horse herds near Las Vegas. The herd is made up of descendants of 1800s horse trade escapees and horses abandoned by Native Americans, Las Vegas settlers, ranchers, and prospectors in the area that moved to the Spring Mountains. BLM currently estimates a smaller population of 47-66 wild horses in the HMA, as, due to a drought and food depletion, BLM had previously removed and relocated 236 of the wild horses from the range. The Wheeler Pass HMA is also home to burros, elk, mule deer, coyotes, bobcats, jackrabbits, and mountain lions.

== Recreation ==
Cold Creek is located within the Spring Mountains National Recreation Area and has Cold Creek Ranch Historic Site. Parking lots serve multiple trails in the area which are popularly traveled on horseback.

Willow Creek Campground, located west of Cold Creek, is accessible from the community via Wheeler Pass Road.

Bonanza Trailhead and Group Camp, located south of Cold Creek, is accessible from the community via Bonanza Camp Road.

The Nevada Department of Wildlife stocks Cold Creek Pond with rainbow trout several times throughout the year.

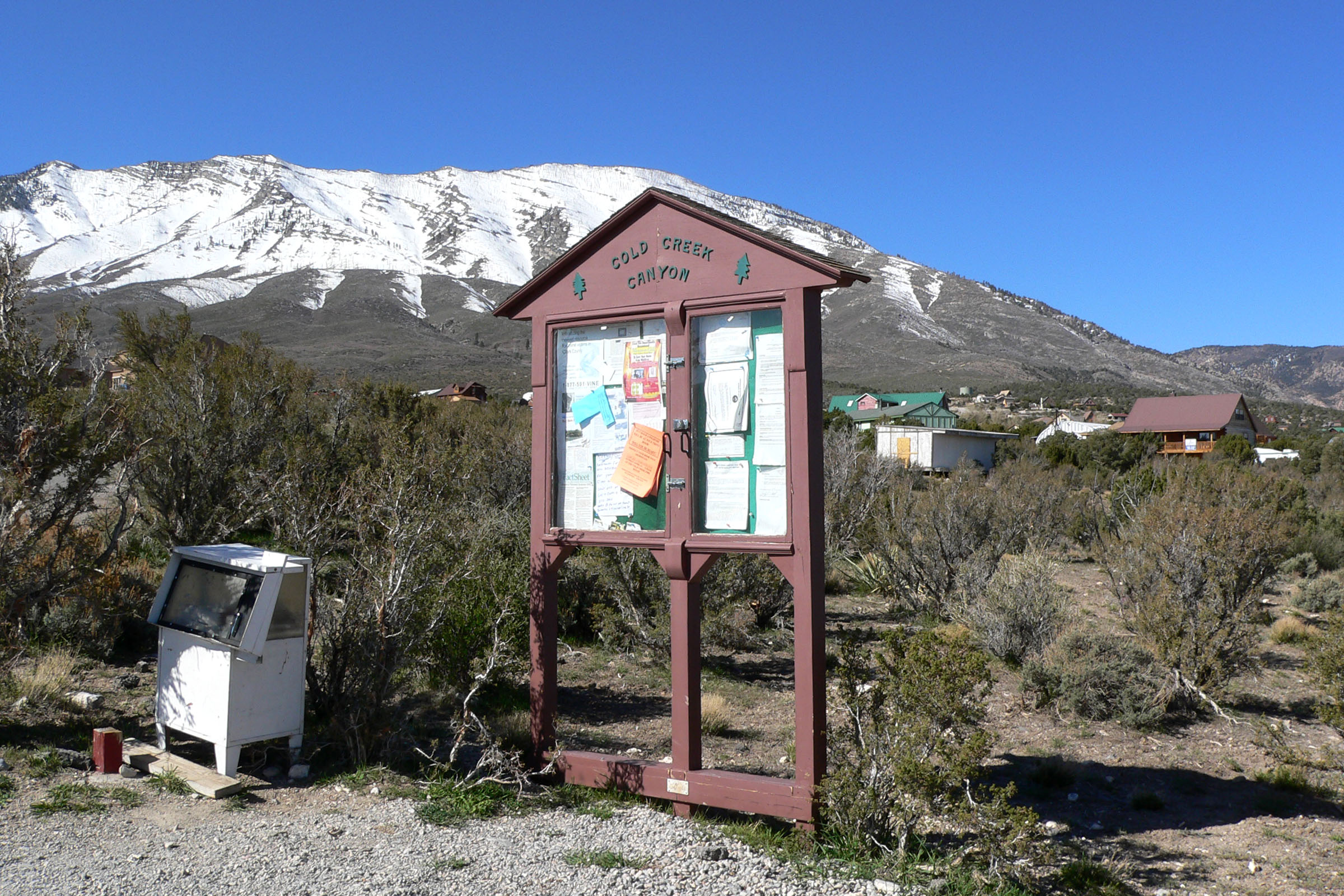
Cold Creek Canyon Trailhead

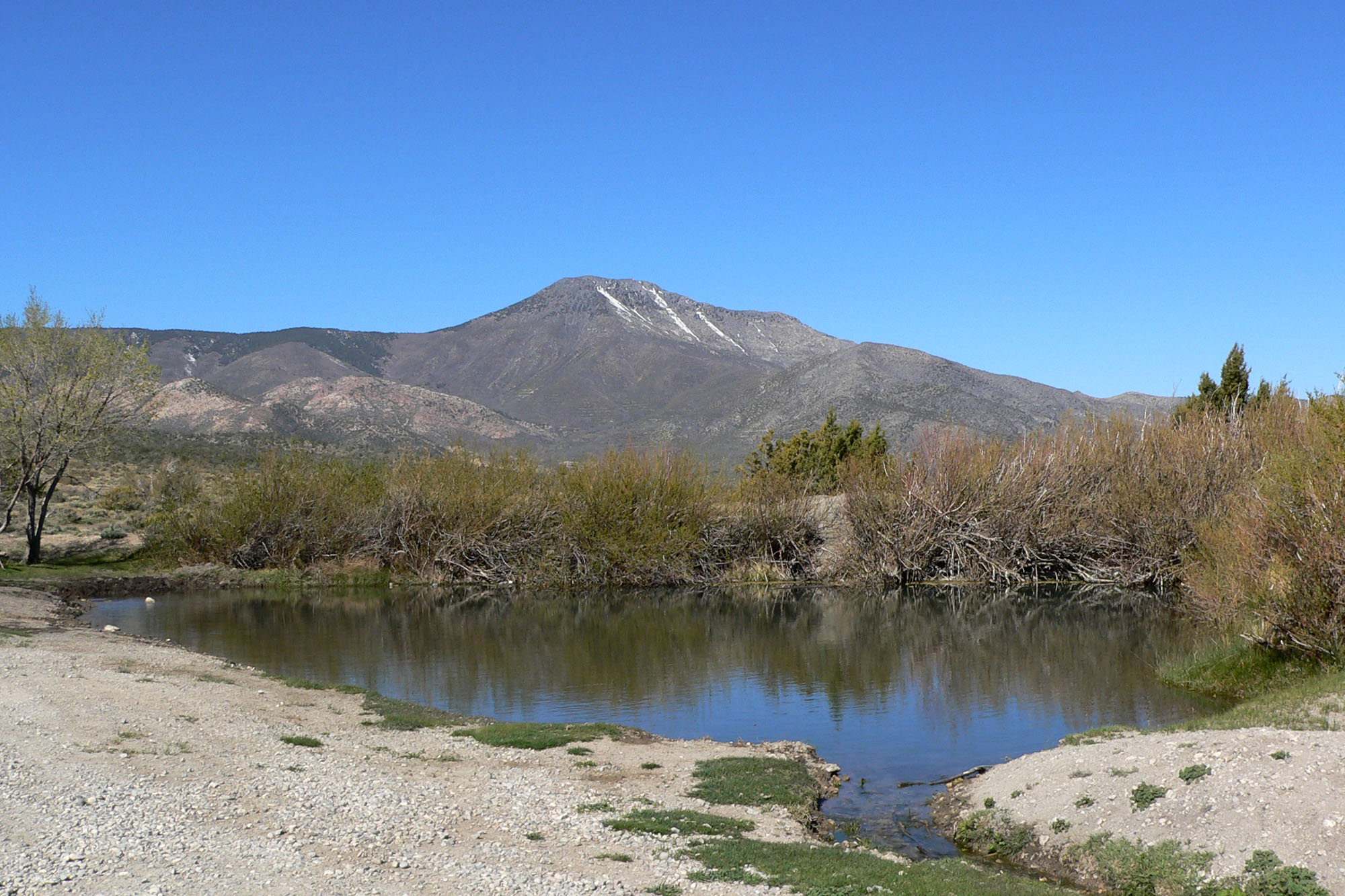
A spring in Cold Creek, with the Spring Mountains in the background

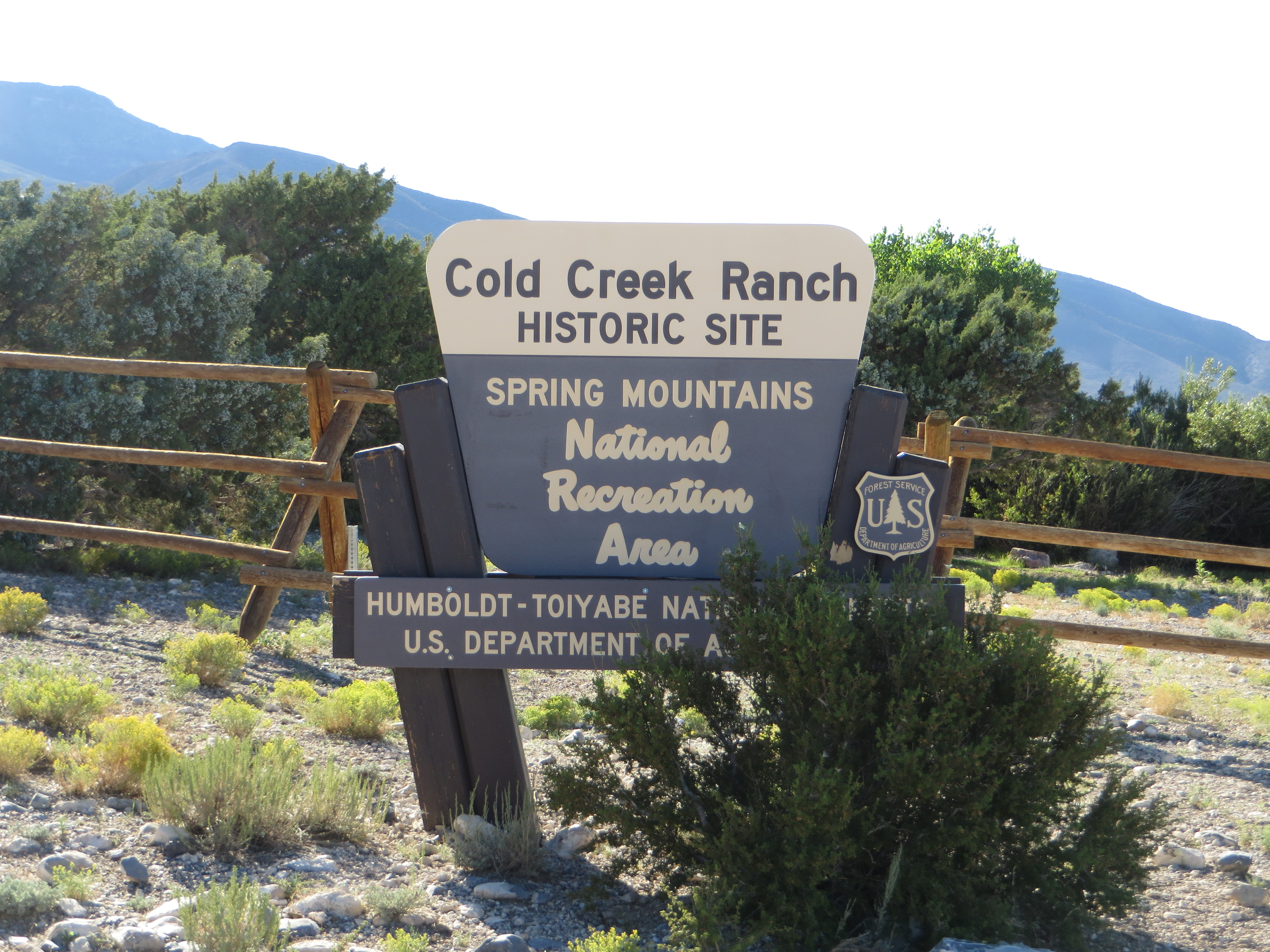
Cold Creek Ranch Historic Site
