= Weso, Nevada =

Unincorporated community in Nevada, US

Weso
- Unincorporated community
- Location within Nevada Location within the United States
- Coordinates: 41°00′41″N 117°41′29″W
- Country: United States
- State: Nevada
- County: Humboldt
- Elevation: 4,304 ft (1,312 m)
- Time zone: UTC-8 (Pacific (PST))
  - Summer (DST): UTC-7 (PDT)
- ZIP code: 89445
- Area code: 775
- GNIS feature ID: 856170

Weso is an unincorporated community and railroad siding in Humboldt County, Nevada, United States located northeast of Winnemucca at the junction of the Winnemucca, Nevada and Elko Subdivisions of the Union Pacific Railroad.

Located nearby across the railroads is the Winnemucca Trap Club shooting range.

== History ==
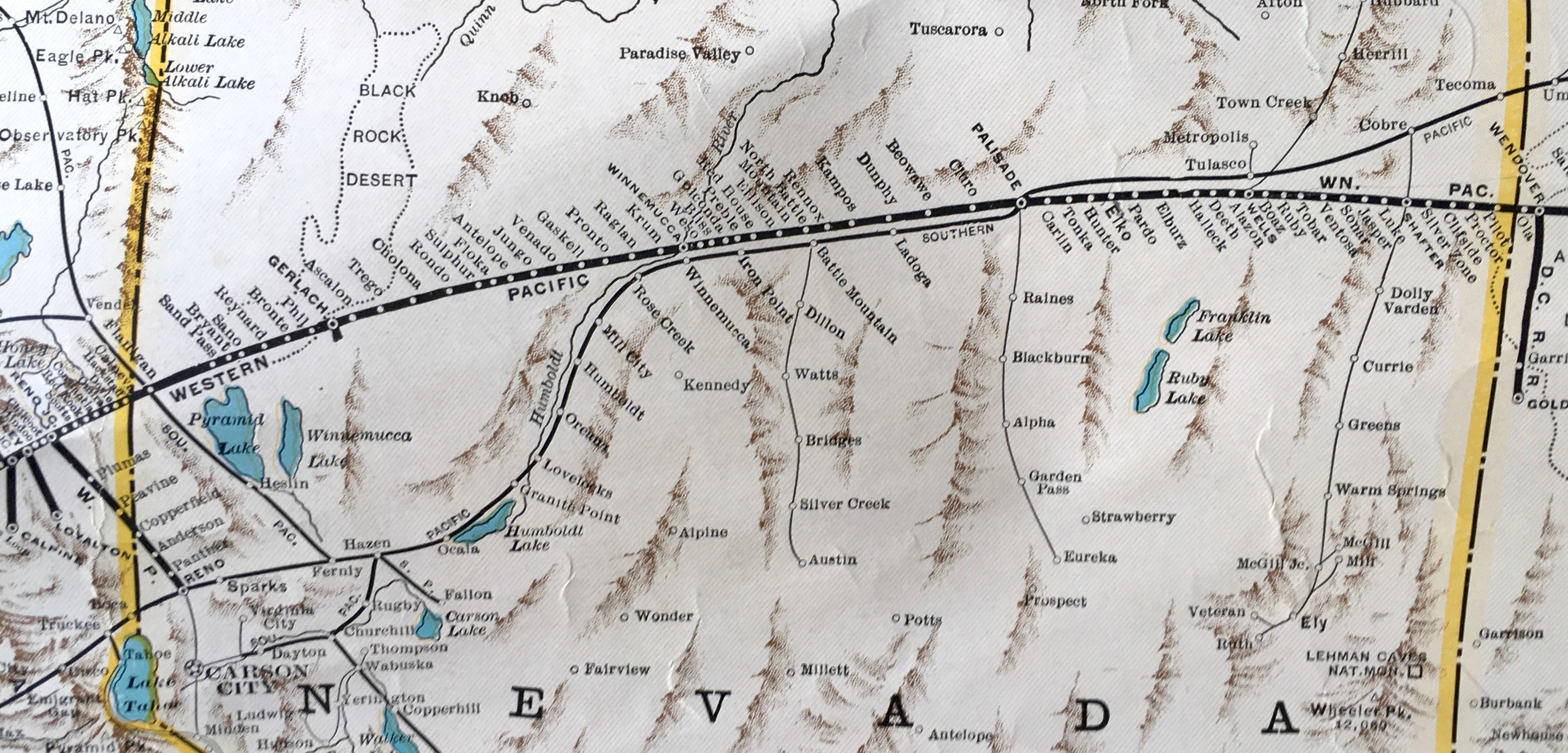
Western Pacific map of Nevada in 1931

In c. 1940, the population of Weso was 15.

Both Southern Pacific Transportation Company and Western Pacific Railroad operated railroads through Northern Nevada, with stations in Weso, with both operating independently until their acquisitions by Union Pacific Railroad in 1996 and 1982 respectively. The tracks are also currently used by Amtrak's California Zephyr.
