= Las Vegas Beltway =

Highway in Nevada

Las Vegas Beltway
- Bruce Woodbury Beltway
- Interstate 215 in red, Clark County 215 in blue

Route information
- Auxiliary route of I-15
- Maintained by NDOT and Clark County Public Works
- Length: 50.073 mi (80.585 km) I-215: 11.173 miles (17.981 km); CC 215: 38.9 miles (62.6 km)
- Existed: April 17, 1993–present
- Component highways: I-215 from Henderson to Enterprise; CC 215 from Enterprise to North Las Vegas
- NHS: Entire route

Major junctions
- Beltway around Las Vegas
- Counterclockwise end: I-11 / US 93 / US 95 / SR 564 in Henderson
- SR 146 in Henderson; SR 171 / SR 562 in Paradise; I-15 in Enterprise; SR 159 in Summerlin South; SR 613 in Las Vegas; I-11 / US 95 in Las Vegas
- Clockwise end: I-15 / US 93 in North Las Vegas

Location
- Country: United States
- State: Nevada
- County: Clark

Highway system
- Interstate Highway System; Main; Auxiliary; Suffixed; Business; Future; Nevada State Highway System; Interstate; US; State; Pre‑1976; Scenic
← SR 208	→ SR 221

The Las Vegas Beltway (officially named the Bruce Woodbury Beltway), locally referred to as The 215, is a 50-mile (80 km) beltway route circling three-quarters of the Las Vegas Valley in southern Nevada. The Las Vegas Beltway carries two numerical designations. 11.173 miles (17.981 km) of the highway, from its southern terminus at Interstate 11 (I-11) / U.S. Route 93 (US 93) / US 95 in Henderson west and northwest to I-15, is signed as Interstate 215 (I-215) and maintained by the Nevada Department of Transportation. Clark County Route 215 (CC 215) composes the remaining approximately 38.9 miles (62.6 km) of this semi-circumferential highway, with the county's Department of Public Works responsible for all construction and maintenance. The beltway is a freeway up to Interstate Highway standards in its entirety.

Clark County planned and constructed the beltway. This marked the first time in the United States that a county had overseen the construction of an Interstate highway with little to no state or federal funding. As late as 2009, the CC 215 portion of the beltway was expected be redesignated I-215 and the entire facility turned over to the Nevada Department of Transportation for maintenance once all the expressway segments of the beltway were completely upgraded to a freeway. However, as of 2026, this has not happened yet, even though the beltway is a freeway for its entire length.

== Route description ==
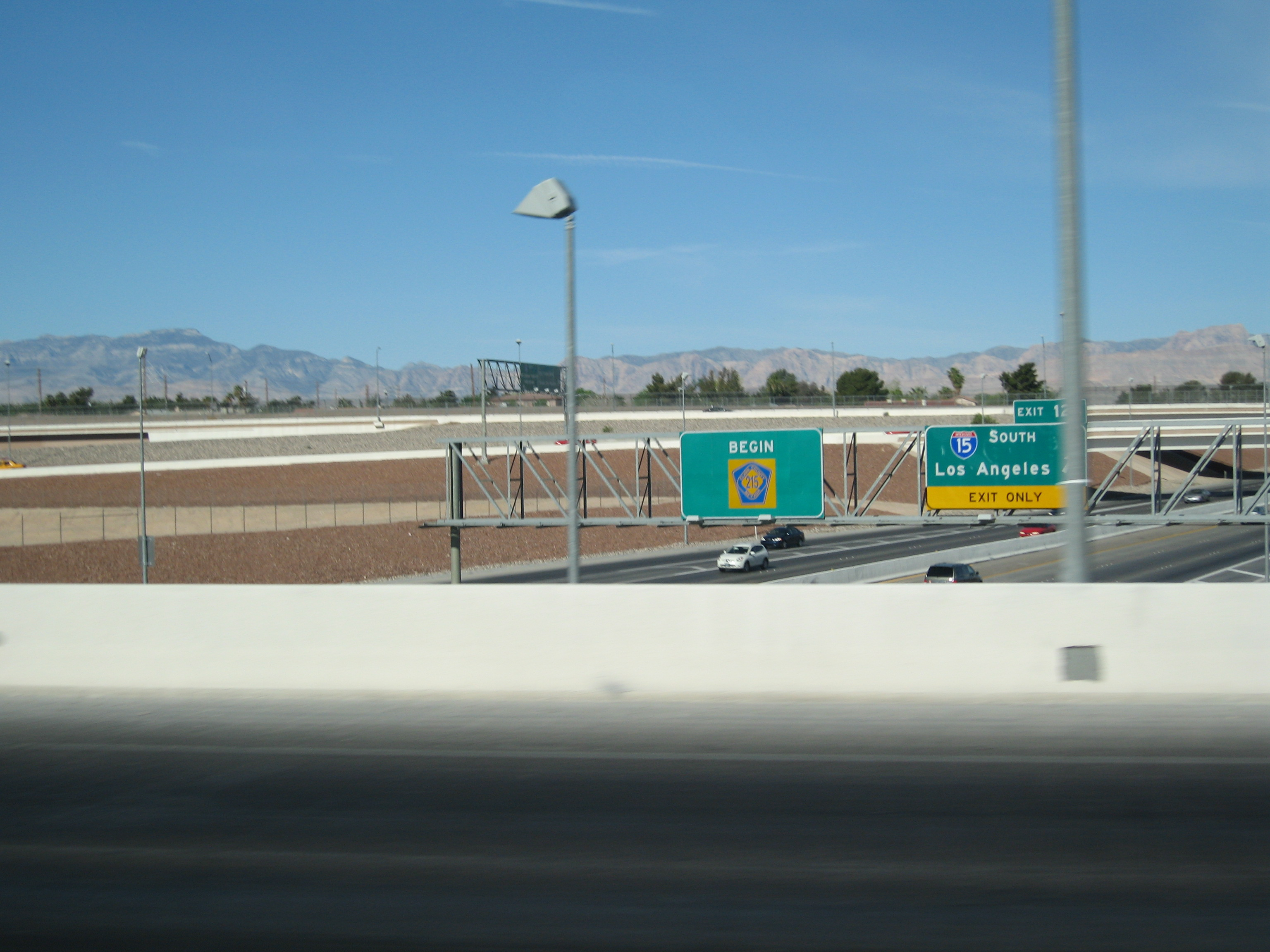
Southern beginning of CC 215, as viewed from the I-15 southbound overpass as seen in 2009

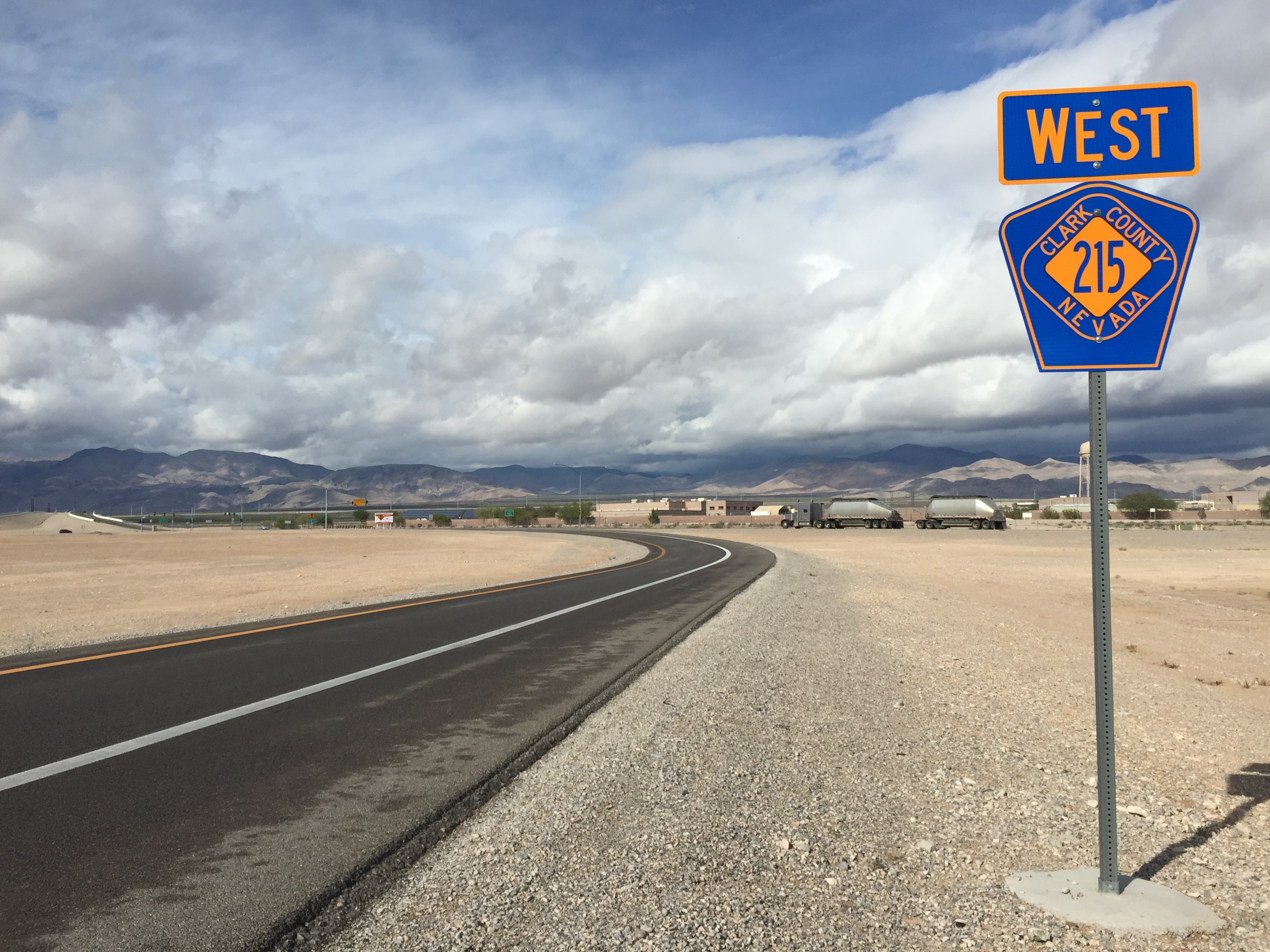
Northeastern beginning of CC 215 as seen in 2015

The Las Vegas Beltway begins in Henderson at the I-11 / US 93 / US 95 interchange, where traffic on westbound Nevada State Route 564 (SR 564, Lake Mead Parkway) defaults onto I-215 west. From here, the beltway primarily follows the former Lake Mead Drive alignment west to the Pecos Road / Saint Rose Parkway (SR 146) interchange. The highway then curves northwest toward Harry Reid International Airport before turning west to cross under Las Vegas Boulevard and I-15.

As the beltway passes under I-15, it changes from Interstate to county highway as it heads nearly due west. Passing Decatur Boulevard, two one-way frontage roads (which formerly carried the initial beltway facilities) appear on either side of the highway. At Durango Drive, the beltway turns northward. The frontage roads end as the beltway reaches Tropicana Avenue, but the beltway continues briefly west and then north again to intersect Charleston Boulevard (SR 159) near Red Rock Canyon. As it passes north through the community of Summerlin (part of the city of Las Vegas), the beltway meets Summerlin Parkway at a partial system interchange.

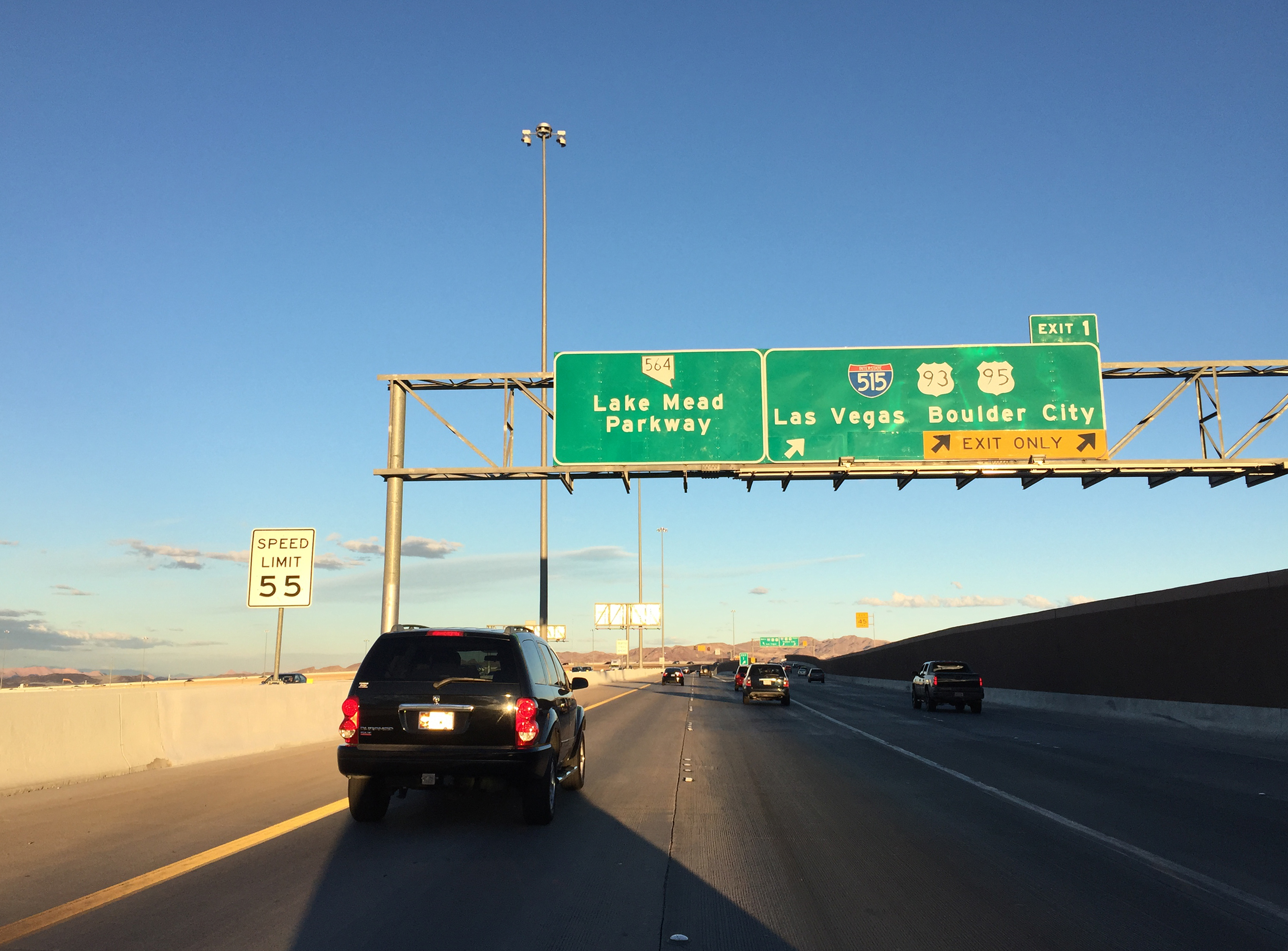
View east at the east end of I-215 in Henderson as seen in 2015

From here, the beltway continues north along the western foothills of Las Vegas to pass behind Lone Mountain. Soon afterward, the beltway curves to the east and intersects I-11/US 95 at the Centennial Bowl. From there, the beltway continues nearly due east along the alignment of Centennial Parkway before entering northern North Las Vegas at Decatur Boulevard. From there, it swings northeast, passing the extensive Aliante development before turning east again. From here on, much of the final few miles of the route are in undeveloped land, except near the interchange at North 5th Street. At North Lamb Boulevard, the beltway swings southeast before reaching its clockwise terminus at I-15 and US 93 above their diamond interchange with Tropical Parkway at a semi-directional T interchange, approximately 2.5 miles (4.0 km) west of the Las Vegas Motor Speedway.

== History ==
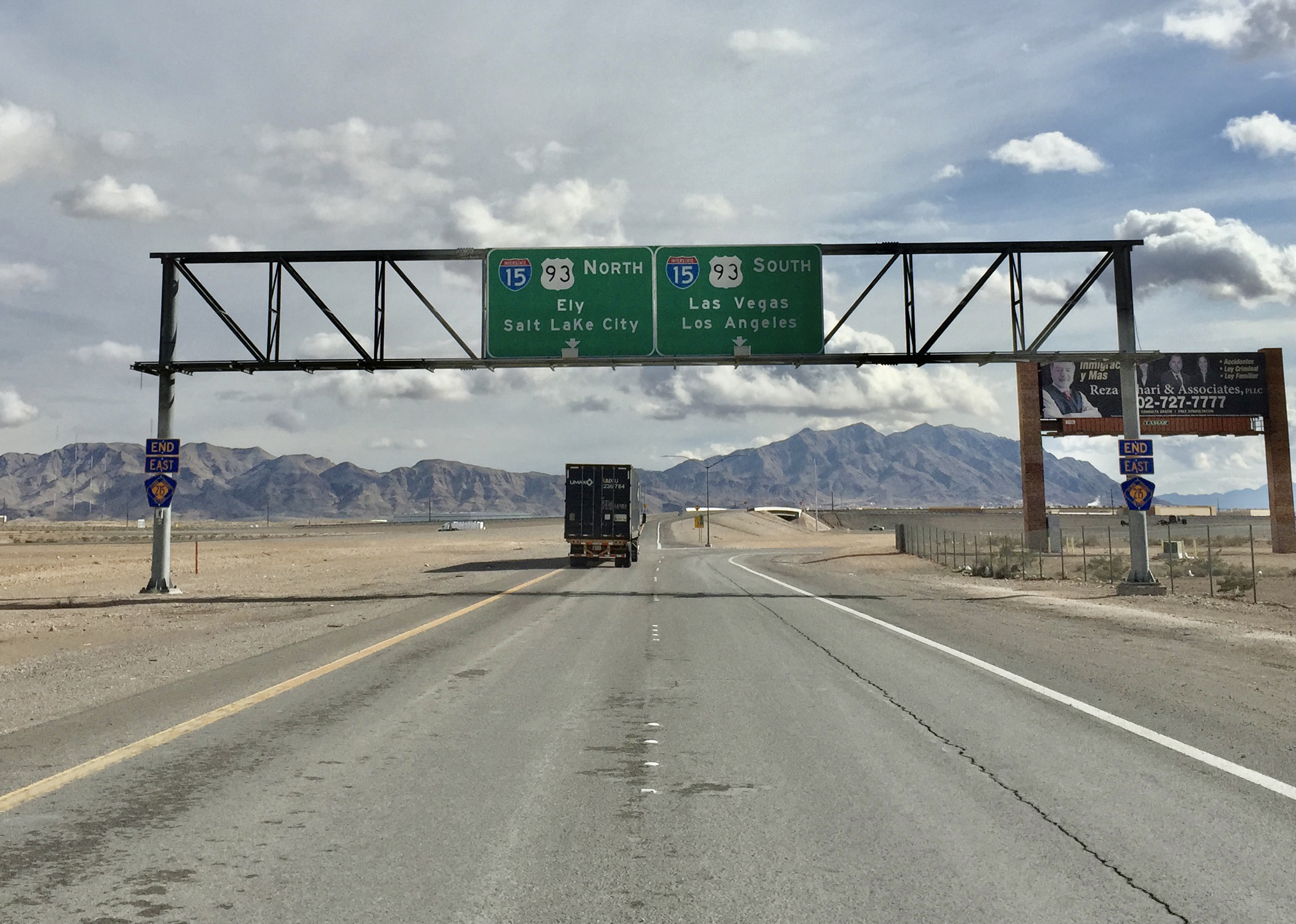
View east at the northeastern end of CC 215 in North Las Vegas as seen in 2015

AASHTO approved the I-215 designation for approximately 18.9 miles (30.4 km) of (then unbuilt) highway, from Tropicana Avenue to US 95 on April 17, 1993. As eventually built, this specific portion of the beltway is 19.59 miles (31.53 km) in length.

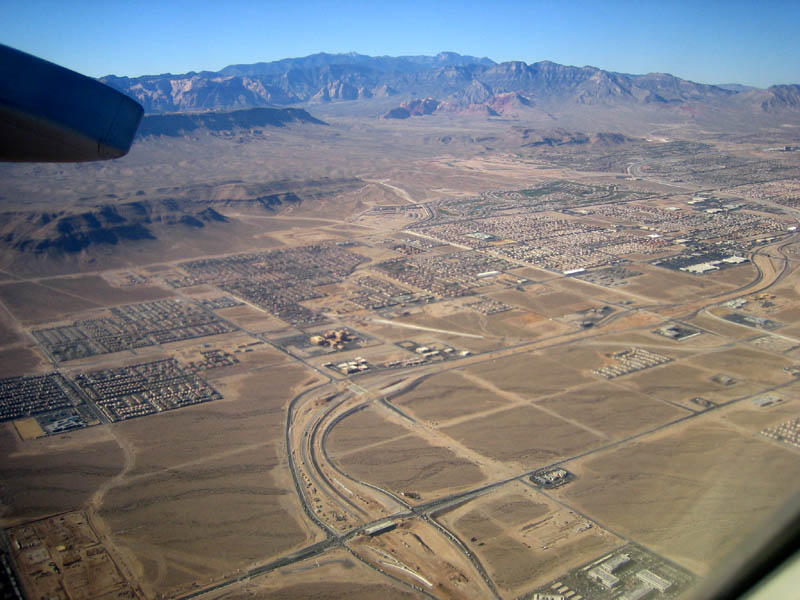
The southwest corner of CC 215 under construction, as seen from the air in early 2006. The two frontage roads initially carried mainline traffic until the freeway was completed later that year.

Much of the beltway was built completely with local funds and expressway to freeway upgrades have continued to be built without state or federal money (except for the US 95 interchange upgrade). A tax measure voted on by the County residents increased funding for the beltway. As a result, it was expected to be fully upgraded to a freeway by 2013, rather than the previous goal of 2025. The full freeway conversion was completed in 2023.

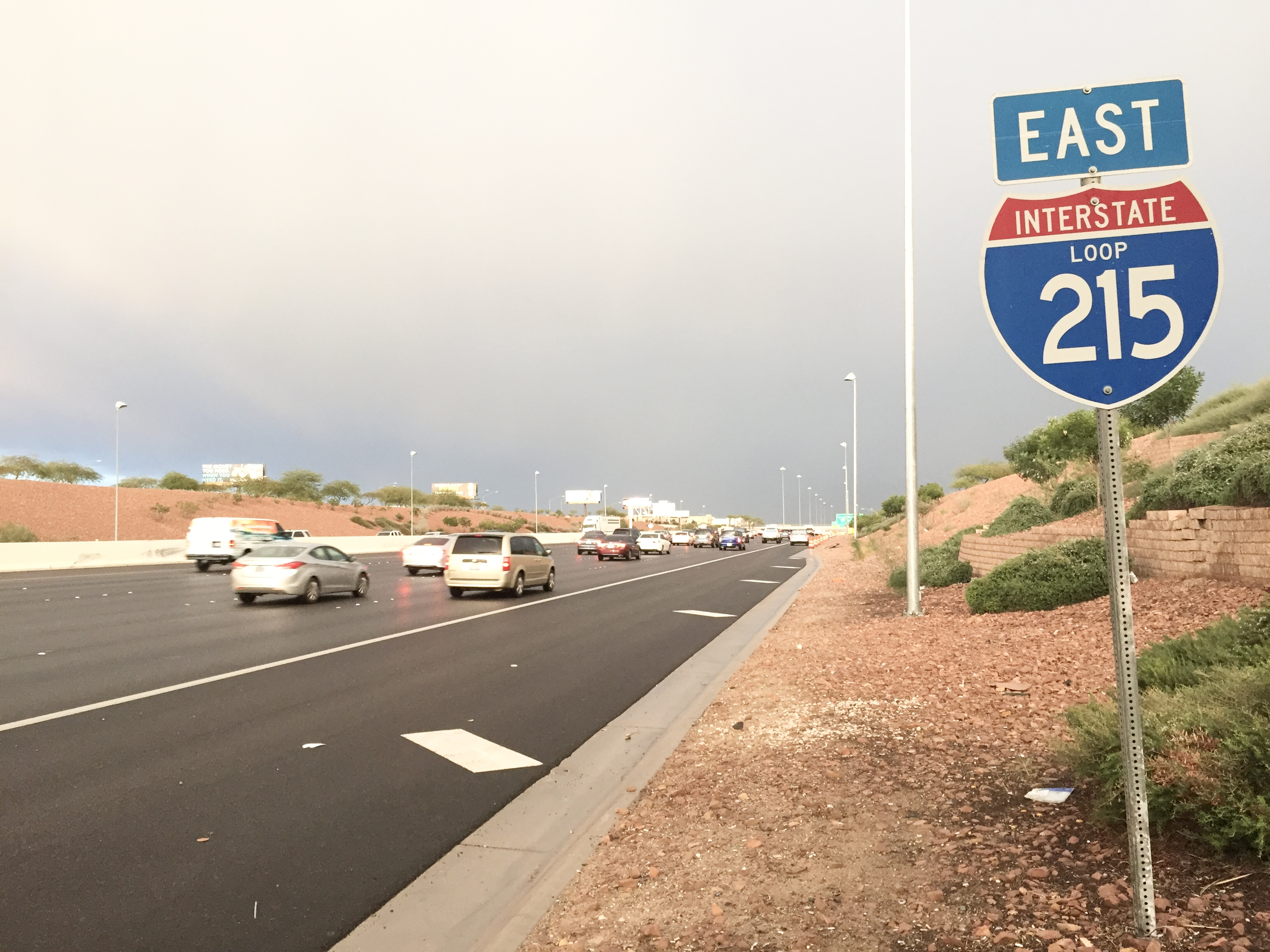
First reassurance sign along eastbound I-215 as seen in 2015

The first section of I-215 opened to traffic in 1996 from I-15 to Warm Springs Road, including the Harry Reid Airport Connector and tunnel, which linked Harry Reid International Airport to southern metro Las Vegas without requiring motorists to use Tropicana Avenue or Russell Road to access the main passenger terminal. The southeast leg of the beltway (except for the US 95 connection) was completed ahead of schedule in 1999, while the northern end was extended from Decatur Boulevard in 1998 to Tropicana Avenue by 2000. The remaining sections in the western and northern legs of the beltway were completed by 2003—either in their final, full freeway mode, or in one of two lesser interim configurations.

I-215 was built on the SR 146 alignment between a point just east of exit 6 (Saint Rose Parkway / Pecos Road) and mile 0 (the US 93 / US 95 interchange at Lake Mead Parkway, formerly known as Lake Mead Drive). Since the Nevada Department of Transportation (NDOT) does not co-sign state routes along Interstate highways, SR 146 was truncated to its current eastern terminus at I-215. SR 146 was co-signed with I-215 from Pecos Road to US 93 / US 95, even though the state highway designation no longer existed in this section when the freeway was completed. SR 146 signs on I-215 have since been removed.

Roads & Bridges magazine, a national publication that provides technology news and information to the transportation construction industry, named the Las Vegas Beltway as one of the nation's Top Ten Road Projects in 2002. In 2003, the entire 50.5-mile (81.3 km) long beltway was opened, albeit with three different road types—freeway, limited access expressway, and as interim frontage roads—with all the newly opened sections being designated as CC 215.

At the Board of County Commission meeting on March 2, 2004, the beltway was renamed the Bruce Woodbury Beltway. The Board approved a resolution recognizing Republican Clark County Commissioner Bruce L. Woodbury for his many years and efforts in the future of transportation in the valley. On August 9, 2006, a section of freeway was completed that allowed the connection of two previously built freeway portions. This meant a continuous stretch of road consisting of about half the road's overall mileage, from the US 95 / SR 564 terminus to Charleston Boulevard, was now completed to freeway standards.

Construction of the North 5th Street interchange was completed and fully opened to traffic in September 2011. The project's scope included roadway, bridge, drainage, and utility improvements along the northern beltway at the intersection of North 5th Street in North Las Vegas. Begun in 2012 and completed in 2014, construction by the Clark County Department of Public Works built the northern beltway segment between Tenaya Way and Decatur Boulevard. The project widened CC 215 to four lanes, built two new interchanges at Jones and Decatur Boulevards, and built a new bridge to carry Bradley Road over the freeway. Improvements to the beltway were also completed in the southern region of the valley with upgrades between I-15 and Windmill Lane. This project provided one additional travel lane in each direction, added auxiliary lanes between interchanges, and included the widening of four bridges over I-215 at Paradise, Warm Springs, and Robindale Roads as well as for the McCarran Airport Connector. Additionally, the Beltway from Decatur Boulevard to North 5th Street was built out between 2014 and late 2016. A new bridge was built for the expected extension of Revere Street, and the Beltway widened to a four-lane freeway from Decatur Boulevard to North 5th Street.

Construction projects on the 215 beltway included a conversion of the roadways between Craig Road and Hualapai Way to a four-lane freeway with interchanges at Lone Mountain Road and Ann Road, a grade separation for Centennial Parkway, and further improvements to the McCarran Airport Connector with the McCarran Airport Connector 2 project. Additionally, phased construction of the Centennial Bowl system interchange between the Beltway and the US 95 freeway in the northwest valley continued. The northbound US 95 to eastbound I-215 ramp was completed on May 28, 2016. The westbound CC 215 to southbound US 95 flyover ramp opened on July 12, 2017. Additionally, an expanded bridge over Montecito Parkway was also completed in anticipation of the widening of the beltway between Durango Drive and Tenaya Way as part of the construction of the Centennial Bowl interchange.

Construction on the Losee Road, Pecos Road, and Lamb Boulevard interchanges in North Las Vegas began in August 2019. The Losee and Pecos Road interchanges were both completed and fully opened to traffic on March 3, 2020, while the Lamb Boulevard interchange was completed and fully opened to traffic in April 2020. The interchanges were all previously temporary at-grade split intersections with traffic signals and opened in 2006. Construction on the Range Road interchange along with an upgraded interchange between CC 215 and I-15 at the clockwise terminus began in 2020. It was originally scheduled to be completed by the end of 2022; the conversion was finished in 2023.

On December 4, 2023, the $272-million ($287 million in 2025) Centennial Bowl project finished construction. This project eliminated the last remaining traffic signals and interim roadway segment along the beltway, completing the full freeway build-out of the beltway. As a result, the entire beltway is expected to be redesignated I-215 (thus, eliminating the CC 215 designation) and turned over to the Nevada Department of Transportation for maintenance. Additionally, a new collector/distributor road was built for exit 13, connecting I-215 westbound traffic to Decatur Boulevard.

Around February 2025, construction began on the interchange upgrade of the beltway and Summerlin Parkway (SR 613). As of July 19, 2026, it remains under construction.

== Exit list ==
The entire route is in Clark County.

Location	mi	km	Old exit	New exit	Destinations	Notes
Henderson	0.000	0.000			SR 564 east (Lake Mead Parkway)	Eastern terminus of I-215; I-215 eastbound continues as SR 564 East; former SR 146 east; serves St. Rose Dominican Hospital – Rose de Lima Campus
Henderson	0.000	0.000		1	I-11 / US 93 / US 95 – Boulder City, Las Vegas	Former I-515; I-11 exit 23
Henderson	0.86	1.38		2	Gibson Road	No westbound exit from SR 564 west; opened April 29, 2000; interchange completed in 2006
Henderson	1.86	2.99		3A	Stephanie Street	Signed as exit 3 westbound
Henderson	2.75	4.43		3B	Valle Verde Drive	
Henderson	4.00	6.44		5	Green Valley Parkway	
Henderson–Paradise line	5.00	8.05		6	SR 146 west (Saint Rose Parkway) / Pecos Road	Serves St. Rose Dominican Hospital – Siena Campus
Paradise	6.00	9.66		7	Eastern Avenue	Serves St. Rose Dominican Hospital – Siena Campus
Paradise	7.79	12.54		8	Windmill Lane	
Paradise	8.87	14.27		9	Warm Springs Road	
Paradise	9.54	15.35		10	Sunset Road (SR 562) – Harry Reid International Airport	Access via Harry Reid Airport Connector (including unsigned SR 171); opened on December 31, 1995; interchange upgrade project under construction as of July 2026; eastern termini of frontage roads Hidden Well Road (westbound) and George Crockett Road (eastbound)
Enterprise	10.81	17.40		11	Las Vegas Boulevard	Eastbound exit is part of exit 12B; former SR 604/US 91/US 466; western termini of frontage roads Hidden Well Road (westbound) and George Crockett Road (eastbound)
Enterprise	11.173	17.981	10	12	I-15 – Los Angeles, Las Vegas, Salt Lake City	Counterclockwise terminus of CC 215 and western terminus of I-215; signed as exits 12A (south) and 12B (north) eastbound and exits 12A (north) and 12B (south) westbound; I-15 exit 34
Enterprise				13	Decatur Boulevard	Eastern termini of frontage roads Roy Horn Way (eastbound) and Rafael Rivera Way (westbound)
Enterprise				14	Jones Boulevard	Frontage road intersections opened on November 11, 1999; interchange conversions completed in 2004
Enterprise–Spring Valley line				15	Rainbow Boulevard	Frontage road intersections opened on November 11, 1999; interchange conversions completed in 2004; serves Spring Valley Hospital; former SR 595
Spring Valley				16	Buffalo Drive	Opened in 2006; serves St. Rose Dominican Hospital – San Martín Campus
Spring Valley				17	Durango Drive / Sunset Road	Westbound exit and eastbound entrance; opened in 2006; serves Southern Hills Hospital & Medical Center and St. Rose Dominican Hospital – San Martín Campus
Spring Valley			Cardinal direction change: South Leg (west–east) / West Leg (north–south) (Note: As indicated by mile markers and reassurance shields along the mainline.)			
Spring Valley				18	Sunset Road / Durango Drive	Southbound exit and northbound entrance; opened in 2006; serves Southern Hills Hospital & Medical Center and St. Rose Dominican Hospital – San Martín Campus; frontage roads change name and direction: Rafael Rivera Way (westbound) becomes Brent Thurman Way (northbound); Jerry Tarkanian Way (southbound) becomes Roy Horn Way (eastbound)
Spring Valley				19	Russell Road	
Spring Valley				20	Tropicana Avenue	Opened in 2006; northern termini of frontage roads Brent Thurman Way (northbound) and Jerry Tarkanian Way (southbound)
Spring Valley				21	Flamingo Road	
Summerlin South				23	Town Center Drive	Opened in 2005; bridge is named "Marty Manning Bridge"
Summerlin South				25	Sahara Avenue	Opened in 2000; southern termini of frontage roads Hughes Park Drive West (southbound) and East (northbound)
Summerlin South					Summerlin Centre Drive	Interchange under construction as of November 2026; northbound entrance only
Summerlin South–Las Vegas line				26	SR 159 (Charleston Boulevard) – Red Rock Canyon	Opened in 2000; northern termini of frontage roads Hughes Park Drive West (southbound) and East (northbound)
Las Vegas				27	Far Hills Avenue	Interchange constructed in late 2009; serves Summerlin Hospital; interchange upgrade under construction as of November 2026
Las Vegas				28	SR 613 east (Summerlin Parkway) / Sunset Run Drive west	Reconstructed as partial system interchange in late 2009; interchange upgrade under construction as of November 2026
Las Vegas				29	Lake Mead Boulevard	Interchange completed August 2008; opened on November 21, 2008
Las Vegas				30	Cheyenne Avenue / Cliff Shadows Parkway	Interchange opened on October 30, 2007
Las Vegas				32	Lone Mountain Road	Interchange opened in 2018
Las Vegas				33	Ann Road	Interchange opened in 2018
Las Vegas			Cardinal direction change: West Leg (north–south), North Leg (east–west)			
Las Vegas				35	Hualapai Way	Interchange opened in 2003
Las Vegas				37	Durango Drive	Serves Centennial Hills Hospital
Las Vegas				38	I-11 / US 95 – Downtown Las Vegas, Tonopah, Reno	Centennial Bowl; signed as exits 38A (south) and 38B (north); I-11/US 95 exit 91A; system interchange conversion completed on December 4, 2023
Las Vegas				38C	Sky Pointe Drive	Access to Buffalo Drive, Centennial Parkway, and Oso Blanca Road
Las Vegas				40	Jones Boulevard	Interchange opened in 2014
Las Vegas–North Las Vegas line				41	Decatur Boulevard	Interchange opened in 2013
North Las Vegas				43	Aliante Parkway	Interchange opened in 2008
North Las Vegas				45	Revere Street	Interchange completed October 2016, but ramps not opened to traffic until 2018
North Las Vegas				46	North 5th Street	Eastbound ramps opened in 2009 and full interchange opened in September 2011
North Las Vegas				47	Losee Road	Temporary intersection opened in 2006; interchange opened on March 3, 2020
North Las Vegas				48	Pecos Road	Temporary intersection opened in 2006; interchange opened on March 3, 2020; serves VA Southern Nevada Healthcare System
North Las Vegas				49	Lamb Boulevard	Temporary intersection opened in 2006; interchange opened in April 2020
North Las Vegas				50	Centennial Parkway / Range Road	Clockwise exit and counterclockwise entrance; serves Mike O'Callaghan Military Medical Center
North Las Vegas				51	I-15 / US 93 – Las Vegas, Los Angeles, Ely, Salt Lake City	Clockwise terminus of CC 215; signed as exits 51A (south) and 51B (north); I-15 exit 52; system interchange conversion completed in 2023
1.000 mi = 1.609 km; 1.000 km = 0.621 mi: Incomplete access; Route transition; Unopened
