= Russell Road (Las Vegas) =

Highway in Nevada

- Former SR 594 in blue, remainder of Russell Road in red

Major junctions
- West end: Everhart Bay Drive / Ashley Creek Street in Summerlin South
- East end: Broadbent Boulevard in Whitney

Russell Road is a section line road within the Las Vegas Valley of Clark County, Nevada. It is no longer a continuous road through the valley, as Harry Reid International Airport interrupts its right of way. The eastern section terminates at the eastern edge of the airport, with the road resuming at Las Vegas Boulevard on the western edge of the airport. The intersection of Russell Road and Las Vegas Boulevard is often considered to mark the southern terminus of the Las Vegas Strip.

== Major intersections ==
The entire route is in Clark County.

Location	mi	km	Destinations	Notes
Summerlin South	0.0	0.0	Everhart Bay Drive west / Ashley Creek Street south	Private access only; western terminus of Russell Road
Summerlin South			Mesa Park Drive	Roundabout
Summerlin South–Spring Valley line			Hualapai Way	
Spring Valley			Fort Apache Road	
Spring Valley			Future I-215 / CC 215	CC 215 exit 19
Spring Valley			Durango Drive	
Spring Valley			Buffalo Drive	
Spring Valley			Tenaya Way	
Spring Valley			Rainbow Boulevard	Former SR 595
Spring Valley			Torrey Pines Drive	
Spring Valley			Jones Boulevard	
Spring Valley			Lindell Road	
Spring Valley–Paradise line			Decatur Boulevard	
Paradise			Arville Street	
Paradise			Underpass under Union Pacific Railroad	
Paradise			Valley View Boulevard	
Paradise			Polaris Avenue	Western terminus of former SR 594
Paradise			I-15 – Los Angeles, Salt Lake City	I-15 exits 35 and 36
Paradise			Frank Sinatra Drive north (Mandalay Bay)	Southern terminus of Frank Sinatra Drive
Paradise			Las Vegas Boulevard	Eastern terminus of former SR 594; former SR 604/US 91/US 466
Gap in route
Paradise			LAS (Harry Reid International Airport) / Paradise Road to I-215	Western terminus of eastern segment; access via Harry Reid Airport Connector
Paradise			Maryland Parkway north	Southern terminus of northern segment of Maryland Parkway
Paradise			Landing Strip Avenue west to LAS	Eastern terminus of Landing Strip Avenue; provides access to Harry Reid International Airport
Paradise			Eastern Avenue	
Paradise			Pecos Road	
Paradise			Sandhill Avenue	
Paradise			Lamb Boulevard	
Paradise			Mountain Vista Street	
Paradise–Whitney line			Nellis Boulevard north	Southern terminus of Nellis Boulevard
Henderson			Galleria Drive east	Western terminus of Galleria Drive
Henderson			I-11 / US 93 / US 95	Former I-515; I-11/US 95 exit 65
Henderson–Whitney line			Stephanie Street north / Stufflebeam Avenue south	
Whitney			Bridge over Pittman Wash	
Whitney			SR 582 (Boulder Highway)	
Whitney			Broadbent Boulevard	
Whitney			Sam Boyd Stadium	Eastern terminus of Russell Road
Gap in route
Henderson			Weston Ridge Street south	
Henderson			McCormick Road south	
Gap in route
			36.085945°N 114.976020°W	
			Via Della Costrella	Provides access to a gated community
			Clark County Wetlands Park	Eastern terminus of Russell Road
1.000 mi = 1.609 km; 1.000 km = 0.621 mi: Closed/former

== State Route 594 ==
State Route 594
- Location: Paradise, Nevada
- Length: 0.723 mi (1,164 m)
- Existed: 1976–2019

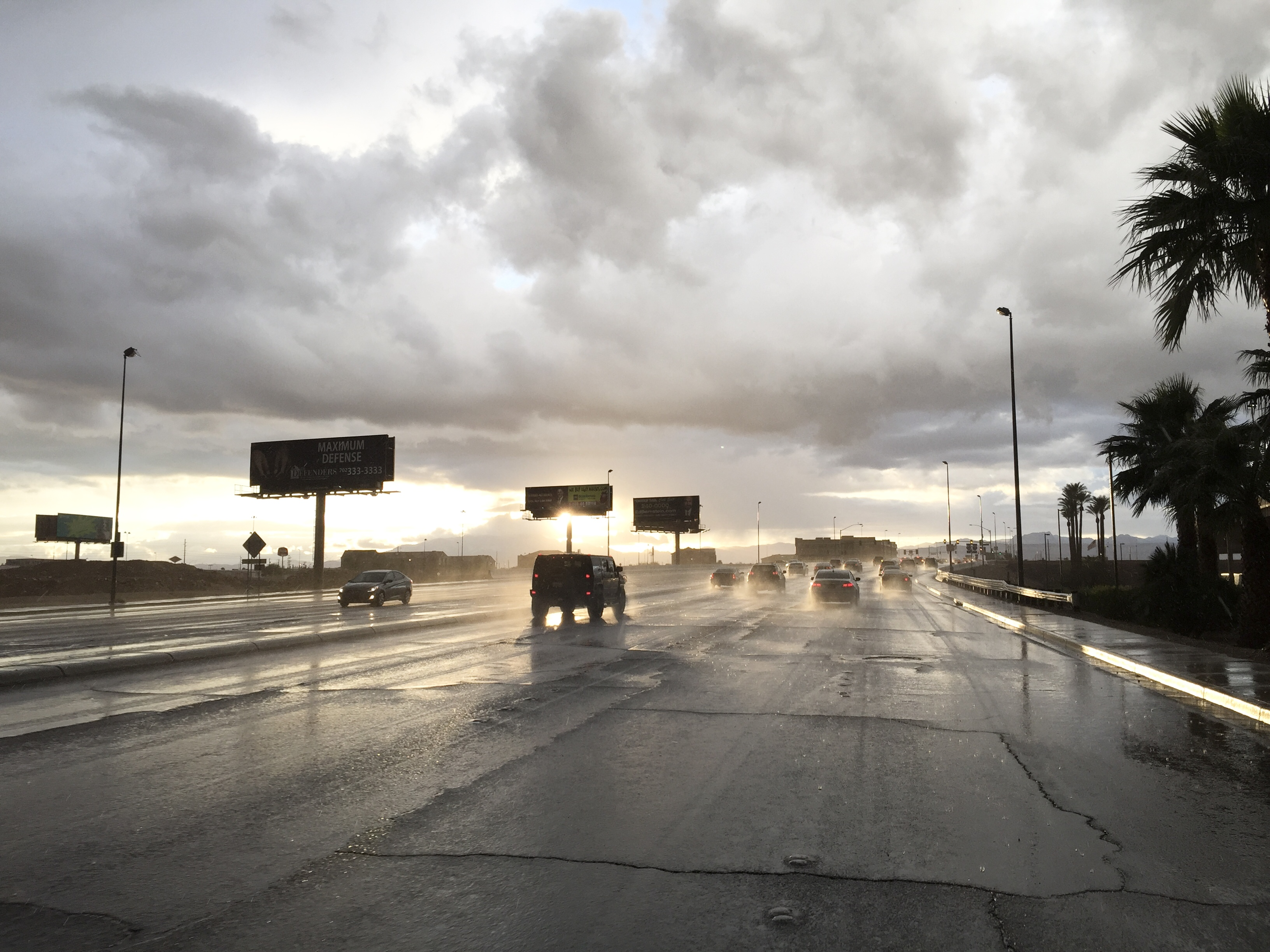
View west along SR 594 as seen in 2015

State Route 594 (SR 594) was a state highway which comprised approximately 0.723 miles (1.164 km) of Russell Road. SR 594 began at Polaris Avenue as a six-lane city street, and extended easterly to meet Interstate 15 at a diamond interchange. The state highway portion of the road continued east and intersected Frank Sinatra Drive to the south before ending at an intersection with Las Vegas Boulevard.

The Nevada Department of Transportation (NDOT) removed SR 594 from its maintenance logs in 2019 and began the process of turning ownership of the roadway over to Clark County.

=== Major SR 594 intersections ===
The table below indicates junctions along SR 594 at time of removal from state highway system. The entire route was in Paradise, Clark County.

mi	km	Destinations	Notes
0.000	0.000	Russell Road west	Continuation beyond former western terminus
0.000	0.000	Polaris Avenue	Former western terminus
0.30	0.48	I-15 (Las Vegas Freeway) – Los Angeles, Salt Lake City	I-15 exits 35 and 36
0.723	1.164	Las Vegas Boulevard	Former eastern terminus; former SR 604/US 91/US 466
1.000 mi = 1.609 km; 1.000 km = 0.621 mi

== Attractions ==
- Harry Reid International Airport
- Mandalay Bay Resort and Casino
- Allegiant Stadium
- International Museum and Library of the Conjuring Arts
