= Civic Center Drive =

Civic Center Drive is the name of a road in several areas including:

- Nevada State Route 607, portion of the road in North Las Vegas
- York Regional Road 65
