= Interstate 515 =

Former Interstate highway in Nevada

Interstate 515
- I-515 highlighted in red

Route information
- Auxiliary route of I-15
- Maintained by NDOT
- Length: 20.54 mi (33.06 km)
- Existed: July 12, 1976–May 21, 2024
- History: 1976: Route number approved; 1982–1994: Opened in stages; 1994: I-515 signs installed; 2024: Decommissioned
- NHS: Entire route

Major junctions
- South end: US 93 / US 95 in Henderson
- I-215 / SR 564 in Henderson
- North end: I-15 / US 93 / US 95 in Las Vegas

Location
- Country: United States
- State: Nevada
- County: Clark

Highway system
- Interstate Highway System; Main; Auxiliary; Suffixed; Business; Future; Nevada State Highway System; Interstate; US; State; Pre‑1976; Scenic

Interstate 515 (I-515) was a 20.540-mile-long (33.056 km) spur route of I-15 in the US state of Nevada that ran from the junction of I-15, US 93 and US 95 (the Las Vegas Spaghetti Bowl Interchange) in Downtown approximately 20 miles (32 km) southeast to just north of Railroad Pass in southeastern Henderson. The freeway connected traffic headed from Boulder City and Henderson to Downtown Las Vegas via a direct, high-speed route and it ran concurrently with, US 93, and US 95 along its entire length.

The I-515 designation was first approved on July 12, 1976, but construction did not begin until 1982, and was constructed in stages until it reached its former terminus north of Railroad Pass in 1994, when signs of the designation finally were put up. I-515 was built to bypass Fremont Street and Boulder Highway, both of which were former alignments of US 93, US 95, and US 466, and provide a direct freeway connection with Henderson.

On August 16, 2017, the segment of I-515 between the I-215 interchange and the southern city limits of Henderson was re–designated as I-11. The Nevada Department of Transportation announced on July 27, 2022, that part of the preferred alternative for the future northward extension of I-11 would follow the remainder of the I-515 alignment. Signs for I-11 and US 95 north of I-15 began to go up on May 21, 2024, by NDOT and the I-515 designation was decommissioned after the American Association of State Highway and Transportation Officials (AASHTO) approved the I-11 designation in October 2022 along with the Federal Highway Administration (FHWA) on November 24, 2023.

== Route description ==
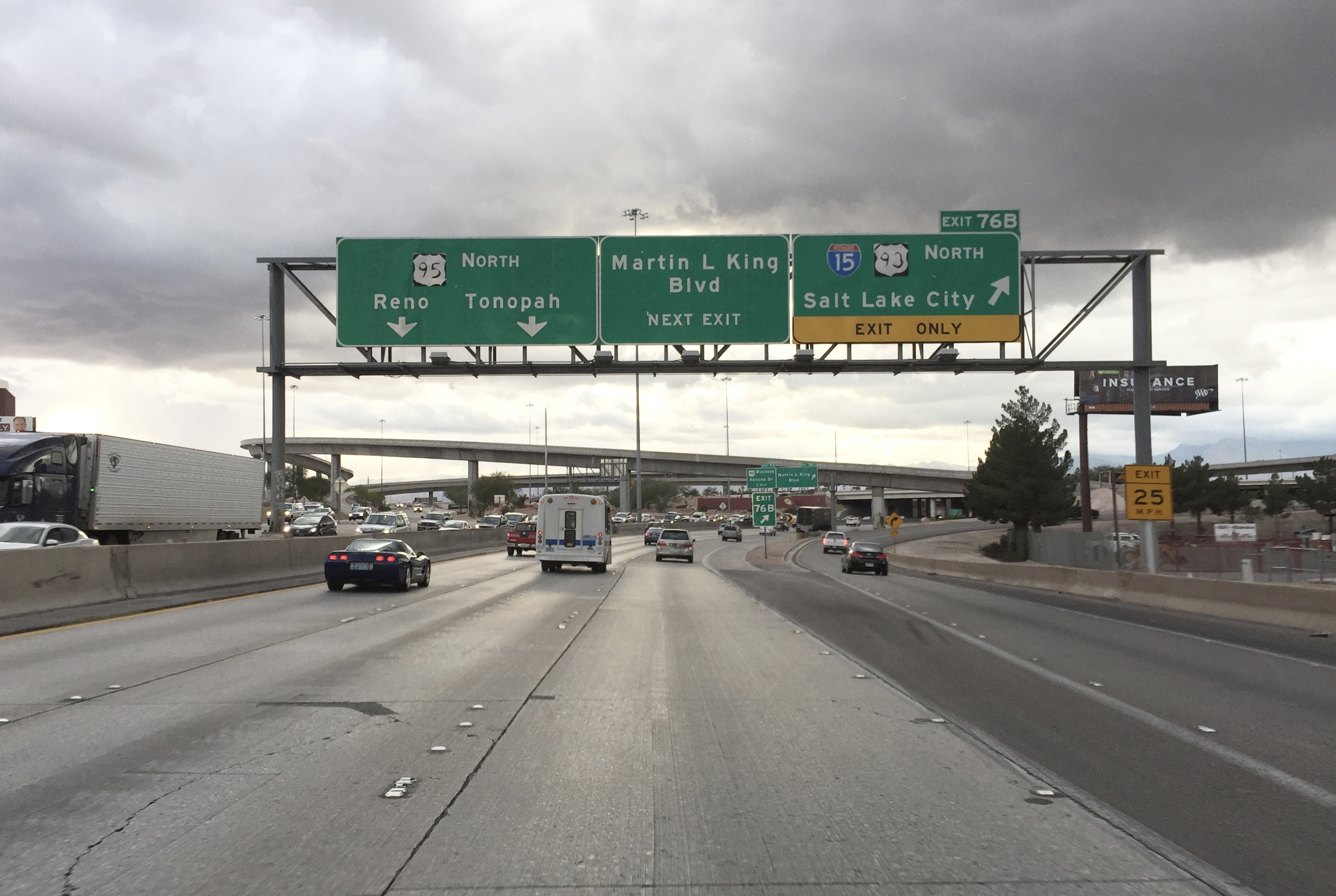
Northbound view approaching the northern terminus of I-515 in 2015

The southern terminus of I-515 was at an interchange with I-11, I-215, US 93, US 95, and SR 564 in Henderson, a suburb of Las Vegas. The freeway continues south as I-11 towards Boulder City and the Hoover Dam on the former alignment of I-515. The six-lane freeway travels northwest from the interchange and carried the concurrent designations of I-515, US 93, and US 95 through Henderson as it passed the Sunset Station casino and Galleria at Sunset shopping mall. I-515 then turned north and intersected Tropicana Avenue (SR 593), Flamingo Road (SR 592), and the Boulder Highway (SR 582) as it approached Las Vegas. After entering the city of Las Vegas, the highway turned west and intersected Las Vegas Boulevard on the north side of Downtown Las Vegas. I-515 ended at the Spaghetti Bowl, an interchange with I-15, while the roadway continues west as Oran K. Gragson Freeway (carrying US 95).

== History ==
Prior to the completion of the freeway, US 93 and US 95 originally followed Fremont Street/Boulder Highway from Downtown Las Vegas southeast through Henderson to Boulder City. Boulder Highway was signed as a business route of US 93/US 95 after the freeway was completed, but that designation has since been removed; it is now just SR 582.

The US 95 freeway, which began construction in 1982, is a continuation of the Oran K. Gragson Freeway (named for the former Las Vegas mayor who advocated for the construction of the then Las Vegas Expressway) which ran primarily along the former West Fremont Street alignment between Las Vegas Boulevard and Rainbow Boulevard. The spur was completed southeast to Charleston Boulevard (SR 159) in 1984, to Tropicana Avenue (SR 593) in 1986, to Russell Road in 1988, to Lake Mead Parkway (SR 564) (then known as Lake Mead Drive, SR 146 west and SR 147 east), in 1990, and finally to Railroad Pass just south of Boulder Highway in 1994 at an at-grade intersection with Paradise Hills Drive (which was eventually removed). With this extension of highway complete, the length of I-515 was 20.540 miles (33.056 km).

The I-515 designation was first approved by the American Association of State Highway and Transportation Officials (AASHTO) on July 12, 1976, from the I-15 interchange to the junction of US 93 and US 95 (at Boulder Highway, current exit 70). On December 7, 1984, AASHTO approved the southeasterly extension of the route to its former terminus in Henderson. Even though the route number was approved prior to the highway's construction, I-515 was not consistently signed until after the freeway was completed down to its former southern terminus north of Railroad Pass in 1994.

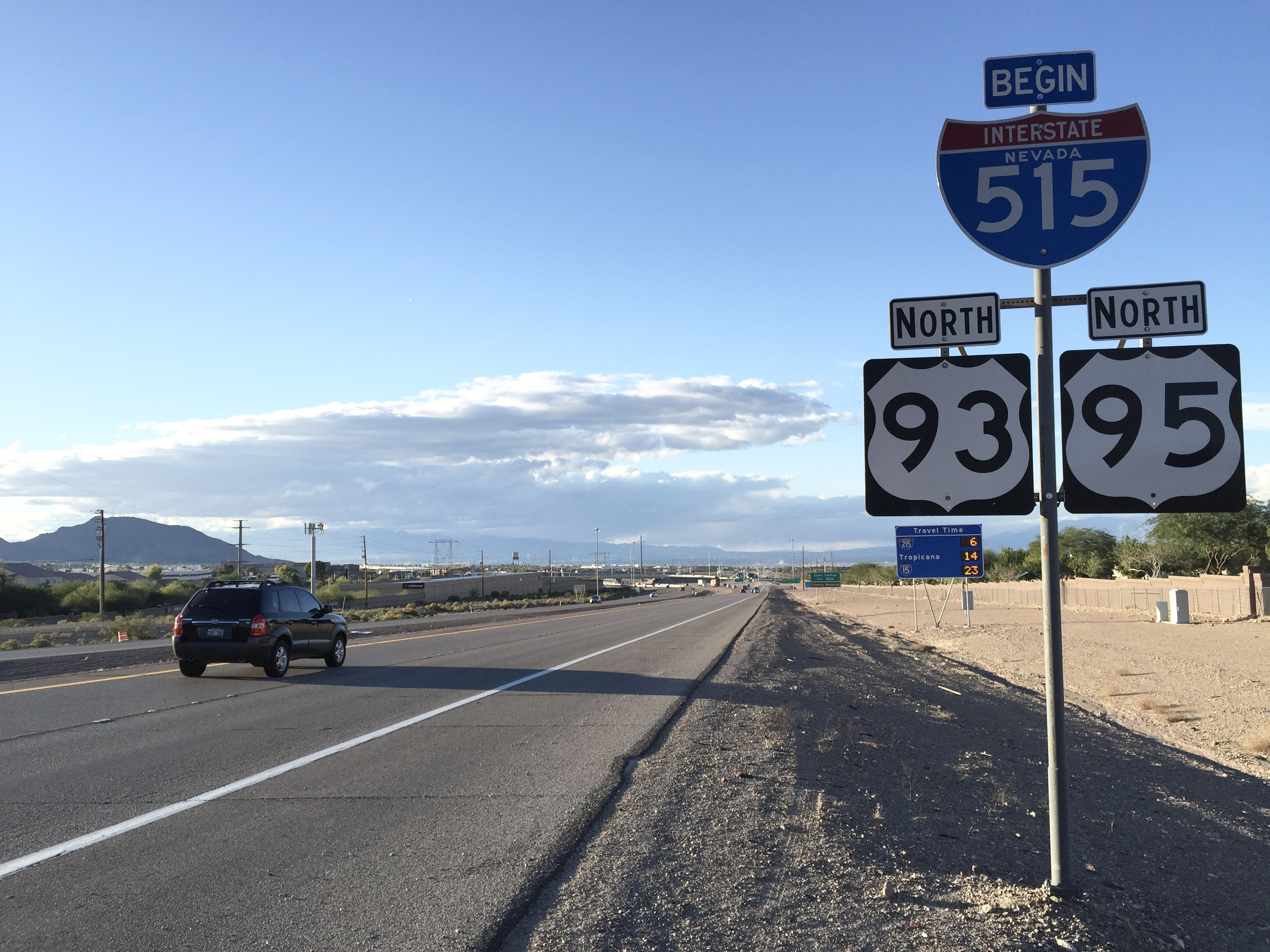
Beginning of northbound I-515 as seen in 2015, at the former southern terminus in the southern city limits of Henderson.

With the pending construction of the Boulder City Bypass introducing the I-11 designation to Nevada, the Nevada Department of Transportation (NDOT) sought to connect the new route to other Interstate Highways. NDOT submitted an application to AASHTO at their spring 2014 meeting to request the designation of "Future Interstate 11", which included routing I-11 along existing I-515 between Railroad Pass and the I-215 Henderson Spaghetti Bowl interchange—AASHTO approved this request on May 29, 2014, with condition that it also be approved by the Federal Highway Administration. The Boulder City Bypass was completed in August 2018. As a result, I-515 was shortened by 5.566 miles (8.958 km) to its current length of 14.444 mi (23.245 km). NDOT began replacing I-515 signs along the southern stretch with I-11 signs on March 17, 2019. The signing continued through April 26, 2019.

The designation of future I-11 is planned to connect the Phoenix, Arizona, and Las Vegas metropolitan areas, with potential for future expansion northwest of Las Vegas to Reno in the northwestern part of the state. The former I-515 alignment, with a continuation northwest along US 95, was one of three corridors under consideration to carry the I-11 designation through the Las Vegas Valley. On July 27, 2022, it was announced that the Nevada Department of Transportation had chosen the central corridor, following the path of US 95, as the preferred alternative for the alignment of I-11 through Las Vegas and signage was put up on May 21, 2024, by NDOT; the I-515 designation was decommissioned.

Beginning in 2022, several construction projects were started or planned to improve the I-515 corridor before it became I-11. The projects included soundwall and retaining wall reconstruction, bridge rehabilitation and interchange improvements. All the projects are expected to be started by 2027.

== Exit list ==
Exits listed below reflect the maximum extent of I-515 prior to being renumbered to I-11. Exits on I-515 were numbered according to US 95 mileposts. The entire route was in Clark County.

Location	mi	km	Exit	Destinations	Notes
Henderson	0.000	0.000		US 93 south / US 95 south – Boulder City, Phoenix, Needles	Southern end of US 93/US 95 concurrency; southern terminus
Henderson			56A	Wagon Wheel Drive / Nevada State Drive	Signed as exit 56 southbound; serves Nevada State College
Henderson			56B	Boulder Highway (SR 582 north)	Northbound exit and southbound entrance; southern terminus of SR 582; former US 93/US 95 north/US 466 west
Henderson			57	College Drive	Serves College of Southern Nevada, Henderson Campus
Henderson			59	Horizon Drive	Diverging diamond interchange
Henderson			61	I-215 west (Bruce Woodbury Beltway) / SR 564 east (Lake Mead Parkway)	Eastern terminus and exit 1 on I-215; western terminus of SR 564; former SR 146; serves St. Rose Dominican Hospital – Rose de Lima Campus
Henderson			62	Auto Show Drive	
Henderson			64A	Sunset Road	Former SR 562
Henderson			64B	Galleria Drive	Opened on November 4, 2009; serves Henderson Hospital
Henderson			65	Russell Road	Serves Sam Boyd Stadium
Paradise			68	Tropicana Avenue (SR 593) – Harry Reid International Airport	
Paradise			69	Flamingo Road (SR 592)	
Sunrise Manor–Winchester line			70	Boulder Highway (SR 582)	Former US 93/US 95/US 466
Las Vegas–Sunrise Manor line			72	Charleston Boulevard (SR 159)	
Las Vegas			73	Eastern Avenue	Former SR 607
Las Vegas			75A	Las Vegas Boulevard – Downtown Las Vegas, Cashman Center	Signed as exit 75 northbound; former SR 604/US 91/US 93/US 95
Las Vegas			75B	Casino Center Boulevard (SR 602 south) – Downtown Las Vegas	Southbound exit only; northbound entrance is via 4th Street
Las Vegas	20.540	33.056	76	I-15 / US 93 north – Los Angeles, Salt Lake City	Spaghetti Bowl; northern end of US 93 concurrency; signed as exits 76A (south) and 76B (north); exit 42 on I-15
Las Vegas	20.540	33.056		US 95 north – Tonopah, Reno	Northern end of US 95 concurrency; northern terminus
1.000 mi = 1.609 km; 1.000 km = 0.621 mi: Concurrency terminus; Incomplete access
