= Centennial Bowl =

Freeway interchange in Las Vegas, NV

- Interactive map of Centennial Bowl

Location
- Las Vegas, Nevada, U.S.
- Coordinates: 36.277770°N 115.267159°W
- Roads at junction: I-11 / US 95; Future I-215 / CC 215

Construction
- Constructed: 2001–2003 (service interchange); 2015–2023 (system interchange)
- Opened: 2003
- Maintained by: NDOT

The Centennial Bowl is a freeway interchange in Las Vegas, in the U.S. state of Nevada, in the Centennial Hills neighborhood. It serves Interstate 11 (I-11) / U.S. Route 95 (US 95) and Clark County Route 215 (CC 215; Bruce Woodbury Beltway). After the full completion of the interchange in 2023, the beltway was upgraded to freeway standards in its entirety.

== History ==
=== Original configuration ===
Originally, the interchange at US 95 and CC 215 at Centennial Hills built in 2003 did not have any flyover ramps and no direct access for some directions. The original interchange had US 95 at freeway standards, but CC 215 with two temporary at-grade intersections. Traffic on the beltway that needed to travel northbound on US 95 would have to turn onto Sky Pointe Drive at a traffic light, turn left to continue on Sky Pointe Drive, and then finally turn left onto a right-in/right-out (RIRO) onto US 95 north. The situation was even less direct for southbound US 95 traffic getting onto the beltway; southbound traffic would have to either exit the interchange at Durango Drive then follow Oso Blanca Road south to its intersection at CC 215, or exit via a RIRO, turn right onto Centennial Center Boulevard, and enter CC 215 via the beltway/Durango Drive interchange.

=== Centennial Bowl project ===
In August 2015, construction of the Centennial Bowl interchange project began.

In July 2017, the first flyover of the interchange was completed, connecting CC 215 west to US 95 south. Around this time, a US 95 north–CC 215 east ramp was built.

In September 2020, the second and longest flyover was completed, connecting US 95 north to CC 215 west and replacing a loop ramp connecting US 95 to the beltway. It is the second longest bridge in Nevada after the I-11 viaduct (then-signed as I-515) in Downtown Las Vegas.

In October 2020, the third flyover ramp was completed, connecting US 95 south to CC 215 east, but with a few delays, but finally opened in the start of 2023, along with a CC 215 east–US 95 south ramp.

In January 2021, the $155 million final phase of Centennial Bowl construction began. This project included a CC 215 interchange with Sky Pointe Drive and connecting ramps to Oso Blanca Road, a CC 215 east–US 95 north flyover, a CC 215 west–US 95 north ramp, a US 95 south–CC 215 east ramp, and conversion of CC 215 from interim roadway to freeway within the interchange area. On December 4, 2023, the $272 million Centennial Bowl project finished construction.

On May 21, 2024, US 95 was re–designated as I-11 by NDOT due to an expansion in Nevada, linking Las Vegas, Phoenix and Reno after the American Association of State Highway and Transportation Officials (AASHTO) approved the I-11 designation in October 2022 along with the Federal Highway Administration (FHWA) on November 24, 2023.
