= Harry Reid Airport Connector =

Limited access roadway in Las Vegas, Nevada

State Route 171
- Airport Spur Connector
- Harry Reid Airport Connector highlighted in red

Route information
- Maintained by NDOT
- Length: 0.685 mi (1,102 m)
- Existed: 1994–present
- Component highways: SR 171 Airport Tunnel Paradise Road / University Center Drive

SR 171
- South end: I-215 in Paradise
- North end: SR 562 in Paradise

Airport Tunnel
- South end: SR 562 in Paradise
- North end: 0.56 mi (0.9 km) north of SR 562, just north of Taxiway C, in Paradise

Freeway segment of Paradise Road
- South end: Airport Tunnel near Taxiway C in Paradise
- Major intersections: LAS (Harry Reid International Airport) in Paradise
- North end: Russell Road in Paradise

Paradise Rd. south / Univ. Ctr. Dr. north
- South end: Russell Road in Paradise
- North end: Tropicana Avenue in Paradise

Location
- Country: United States
- State: Nevada
- County: Clark

Highway system
- Nevada State Highway System; Interstate; US; State; Pre‑1976; Scenic
← SR 170	→ SR 172

The Harry Reid Airport Connector (RAC) is a limited-access roadway system located in Paradise, an unincorporated town in the Las Vegas Valley, Clark County, Nevada, United States. Composed of State Route 171 (SR 171), the Airport Tunnel and arterial streets, the airport connector provides vehicular access to the passenger terminals at Harry Reid International Airport. Despite being completely owned by Clark County, the first 0.685 miles (1.102 km) of the Harry Reid Airport Connector is maintained by NDOT as unsigned SR 171, while the remaining section is maintained by Clark County.

The Harry Reid Airport Connector was constructed and opened to traffic in 1994, in conjunction with the completion of I-215 between Interstate 15 and Warm Springs Road.

== Route description ==
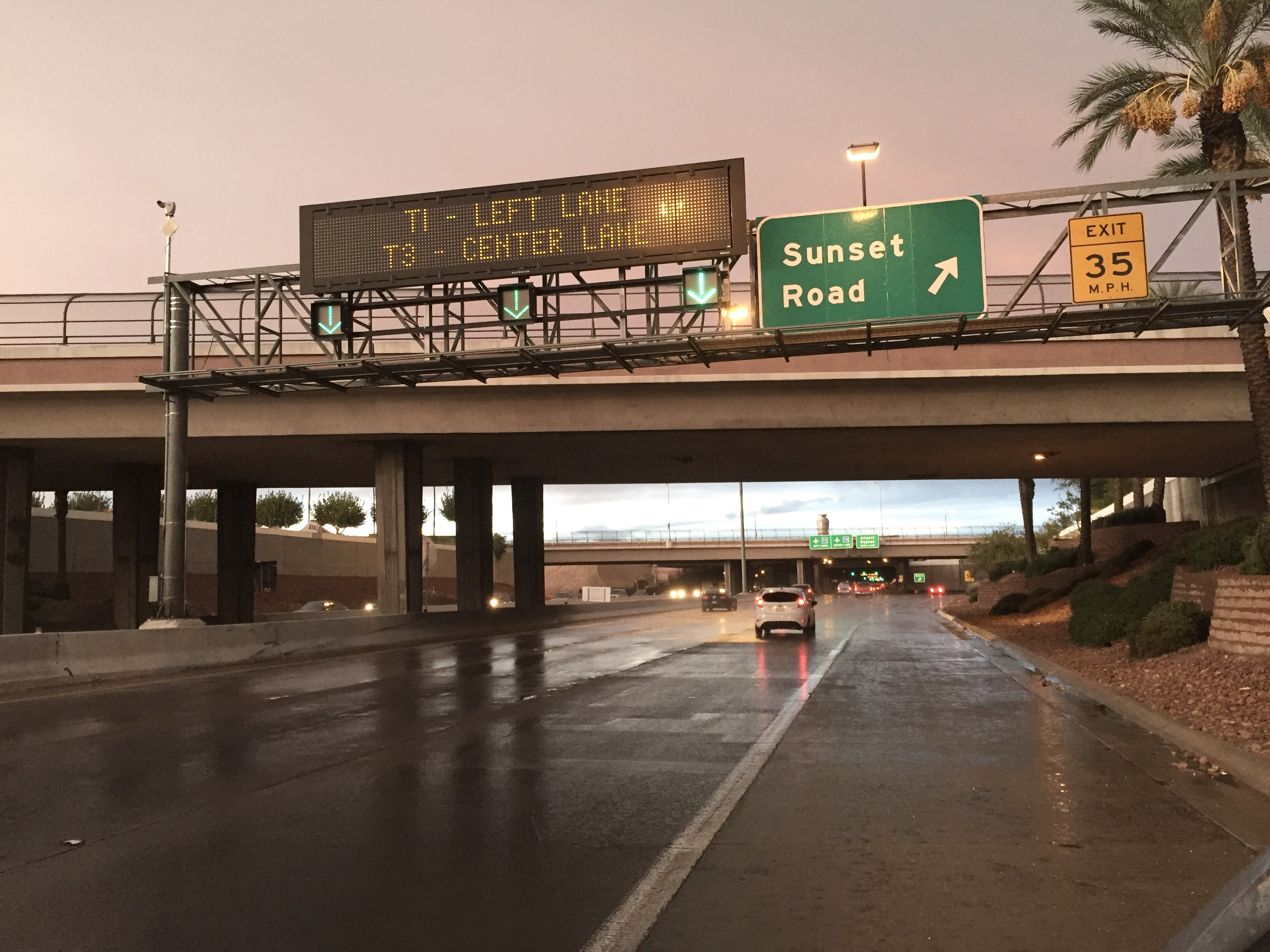
View northbound along SR 171 at Sunset Road as seen in 2015

The Harry Reid Airport Connector begins at an interchange with Interstate 215 (exit 10) in Paradise. From there, the route follows unsigned State Route 171 as it transitions to a below-ground freeway alignment. The connector crosses underneath several local streets and a branch line of the Union Pacific Railroad as it heads northward towards the airport. SR 171 encounters a half-diamond interchange with Sunset Road (SR 562), where the state highway designation ends 0.685 miles (1.102 km) at the south portal of the airport tunnel.

The Airport Tunnel is a grouping of three separate tunnels. One tunnel is provided for northbound traffic with another for southbound traffic, and third tunnel between them is reserved for future transit use. The tunnels continue northward, crossing under the east–west runways and taxiways of the airport and emerging on the opposite side.

Curving westward after exiting the north portal, the RAC meets the main terminal grounds with ramps providing terminal access to and from the south. The freeway grade road ends with a traffic signal at Russell Road. North of the signal, the connector transitions to a one-way couplet network, with northbound traffic following University Center Drive (formerly Swenson Street) and southbound traffic using Paradise Road. Another set of ramps provides airport terminal access to and from the north. Finally, the Harry Reid Airport Connector ends at Tropicana Avenue (SR 593), although the one-way roads continue north for about a mile to Harmon Avenue.

In addition to providing access to the airport, the connector also serves as a shortcut between I-215 and Tropicana Avenue (SR 593) near the Thomas & Mack Center on the University of Nevada, Las Vegas (UNLV) campus. Also, following the relocation of McCarran Airport's car rental facilities to a new, centralized complex at 7135 Gilespie Street, SR 171 and the tunnel are now used by all shuttle buses carrying customers between the main passenger terminals and the rental car facility.

== History ==
SR 171 and the Airport Tunnel opened to traffic in 1994, in conjunction with the completion of I-215 between Interstate 15 and Warm Springs Road.

== Major intersections ==
The entire route is in Paradise, Clark County. All exits are unnumbered.

mi	km	Destinations	Notes
0.00	0.00	I-215 west – Las Vegas	Southern terminus of SR 171/MAC
		Hidden Well Road, Gilespie Street – Rental Car Return	Southbound exit and northbound entrance
		Warm Springs Road	Southbound exit and northbound entrance
		I-215 east – Henderson	Southbound exit and northbound entrance; I-215 exit 10
0.685	1.102	Sunset Road (SR 562)	Northbound exit and southbound entrance; northern terminus of SR 171
		Airport Tunnel	
		Terminals 1 & 3	Northbound exit and southbound entrance
		Terminal 3 (Flight Path Avenue)	
		Kitty Hawk Way	Access to former Terminal 2; intersection southbound; northbound access was via Terminal 1 exit
		Terminal 1	Southbound exit and northbound entrance
		Tropicana Avenue (SR 593)	At-grade intersection; northern terminus of MAC; NB lanes continue as University Center Drive (formerly Swenson Street); Paradise Road feeds into SB lanes
1.000 mi = 1.609 km; 1.000 km = 0.621 mi: Closed/former; Incomplete access
