= Southern Hills Hospital & Medical Center =

- Hospital Corporation of America; Sunrise Healthcare System

Geography
- Location: 9300 West Sunset Road; Spring Valley, Clark County, Nevada, U.S.
- Coordinates: 36.07267°N 115.29506°W

Organisation
- Care system: Private
- Type: Community
- Affiliated university: None
- Network: Hospital Corporation of America; Sunrise Healthcare System

Services
- Standards: Joint Commission
- Emergency department: Yes
- Beds: 265

Helipads
- Helipad: Yes

History
- Founded: 2004; 22 years ago

Links
- Website: southernhillshospital.com

The Southern Hills Hospital & Medical Center is a private, for-profit hospital owned by the Hospital Corporation of America and operated by the Sunrise Healthcare System. The 311-bed hospital is located in Spring Valley, Nevada. Southern Hills Hospital provides the communities of southwest Las Vegas with emergency and pediatric emergency services with four ER locations, a behavioral health program, an accredited Chest Pain Center, a Certified Comprehensive Stroke Center, a dedicated orthopedic and spine unit, OB-GYN,Level III NICU, diagnostic imaging, oncology and surgical services. Southern Hills Hospital was named the Best Hospital in Las Vegas in 2015, 2016, 2017, and 2019.

== History ==
The $140 million hospital opened in 2004. When it was constructed, two extra floors were built and left vacant to speed the construction of future expansions, while reducing the impact of new construction on existing operations.

== Services ==
The Southern Hills Hospital & Medical Center offers a range of health care services, including:

- Behavioral Health Services
- Breast Care Services
- Cardiovascular Services
- Diagnostic Imaging
- Emergency Care
- Critical Care Services
- Maternity
- Women's Services
- Family Health
- Joint Replacement & Orthopedics
- Neurological Services
- Surgical Services
- Robotic Surgery

== Accreditation ==
- Joint Commission accredited
- American College of Radiology (ACR) accredited in MRI, computed tomography, ultrasound and nuclear medicine
