= Nevada State Route 564 =

Highway in Nevada

State Route 564
- Lake Mead Parkway
- SR 564 highlighted in red

Route information
- Maintained by NDOT
- Length: 8.406 mi (13.528 km)
- Existed: 2002–present
- NHS: From western terminus to Lake Las Vegas Parkway

Major junctions
- West end: I-11 / US 93 / US 95 / I-215 in Henderson
- East end: Lake Mead National Recreation Area in Henderson

Location
- Country: United States
- State: Nevada
- County: Clark

Highway system
- Nevada State Highway System; Interstate; US; State; Pre‑1976; Scenic
← SR 562	→ SR 573

State Route 564 (SR 564) is an east–west highway in Clark County, Nevada, in the southeast portion of the Las Vegas Valley. The route follows Lake Mead Parkway through the city of Henderson, traveling from the junction of Interstate 215 (I-215) and I-11, also part of U.S. Route 93 (US 93) and US 95, to Lake Las Vegas, ending near Lake Mead. The route was designated in 2002, replacing a portion of SR 146.

== Route description ==
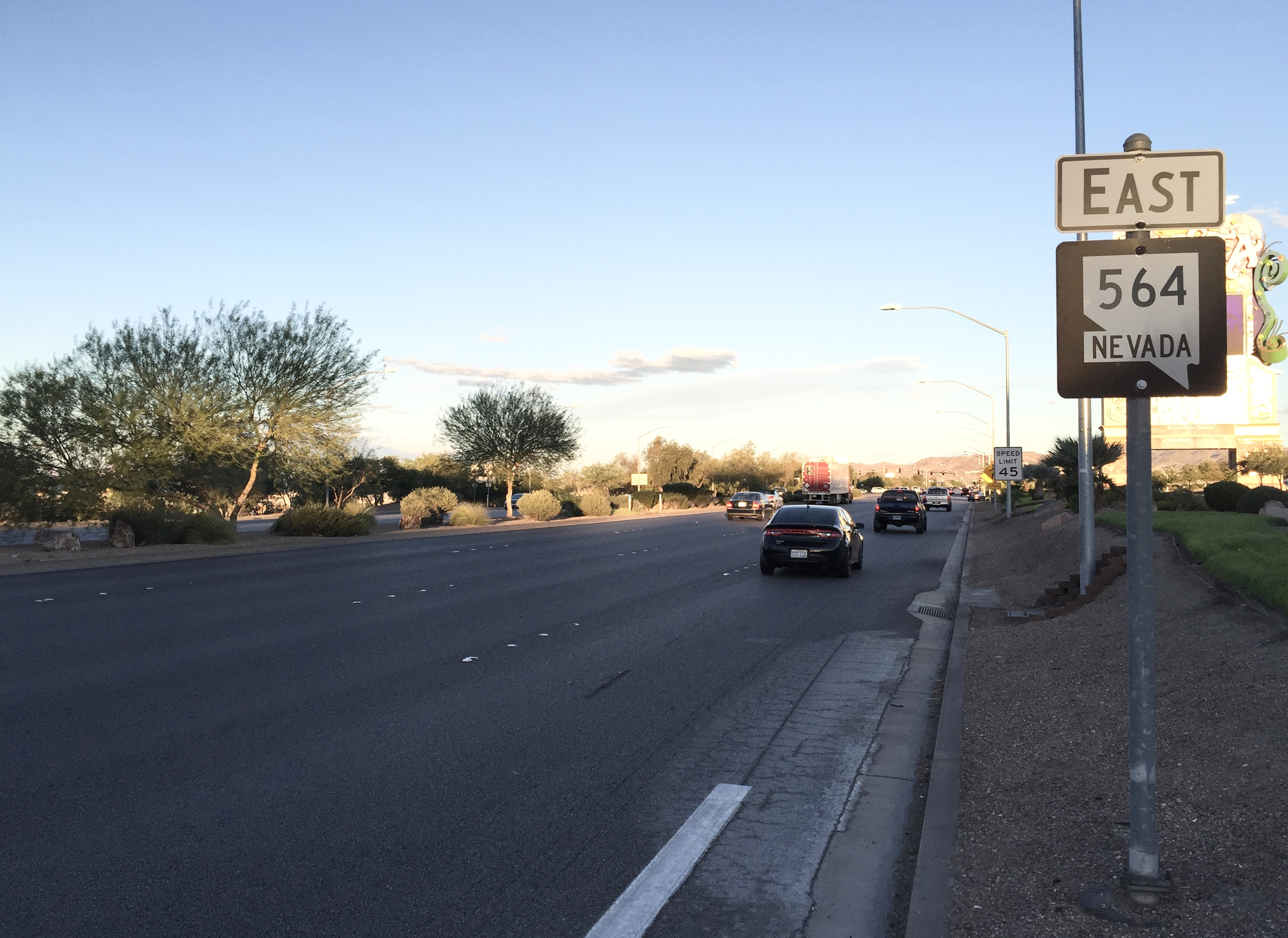
View at the west end of SR 564 looking eastbound as seen in 2015

State Route 564 begins as a continuation of the Las Vegas Beltway, starting where I-215 ends at its junction with I-11, which is concurrent with US 93 and US 95. From there, the route travels east along Lake Mead Parkway, a major arterial roadway, towards downtown Henderson and intersects the Boulder Highway (SR 582). SR 564 continues northeast through Henderson's residential neighborhoods and turns east just west of Lake Mead National Recreation Area. SR 564 enters the park, at a point southeast of Lake Las Vegas, and terminates at the end of state maintenance, while the road continues east. Around 52,500 vehicles travel on the highway near its western terminus on average each day.

The portion of Lake Mead Parkway between its western terminus and Lake Las Vegas Parkway is part of the National Highway System, a network of highways that are considered essential to the country's economy, defense, and mobility by the Federal Highway Administration.

== History ==
In the late 1970s, the highways in the state highway system were renumbered. SR 41 was split into two state routes. SR 146 started from I-15 to US 93/US 95 in Henderson. SR 147 started from US 93/US 95 to North Las Vegas. A limited access highway alignment from US 93/US 95 started construction in 1985–1986. An interchange was built for SR 146 in 1989–1990, and the highway was completed by 1995–1996. The designation I-515 was added to the highway. In the same period, SR 147's designation was removed from eastern section of Lake Mead Drive, and replaced by SR 146. As the Las Vegas Beltway (I-215) was being constructed in the late 1990s, the last five miles (8.0 km) between Lake Mead Drive (now Saint Rose Parkway) and Interstate 515 were constructed on the SR 146 alignment. This left SR 146 in two separate segments. The eastern segment of SR 146 was reassigned to SR 564 by 2002. I-215 from SR 146 to SR 564's western terminus was completed in October 2005.

== Major intersections ==
The entire route is in Clark County.

Location	mi	km	Destinations	Notes
Henderson	−0.41	−0.66	I-215 west	Proposed western terminus
Henderson	0.000	0.000	I-215 west	Western terminus; former SR 146 west; continuation beyond western terminus
Henderson	0.1	0.16	Gibson Road	Proposed interchange; no access to Gibson Road from SR 564 westbound
Henderson	0.3	0.48	I-215 east	I-215 eastbound lanes feed into SR 564 East
Henderson	0.7– 0.9	1.1– 1.4	I-11 / US 93 / US 95 – Boulder City, Las Vegas	Former I-515; I-11 exit 23
Henderson	1.0	1.6	Eastgate Road north / Fiesta Henderson Boulevard south	Eastgate Road also provides access to Auto Show Drive
Henderson	1.0	1.6	Eastern end of freeway	
Henderson	1.4	2.3	Van Wagenen Street	Provides access to the TIMET data center
Henderson	2.2	3.5	Water Street	Lake Mead Parkway changes signage from "West Lake Mead Parkway" to "East Lake Mead Parkway"
Henderson	2.5	4.0	Boulder Highway	Former US 93 / US 95 / US 466 / SR 5 / SR 582
Henderson	2.9	4.7	Burkholder Boulevard east / Grand Cadence Drive north	
Henderson	3.5	5.6	Warm Springs Road	
Henderson	3.9	6.3	Sunset Road west / Center Street south	Eastern terminus of Sunset Road
Henderson	7.3	11.7	Lake Las Vegas Parkway north	Eastern terminus of NHS designation; provides access to Lake Las Vegas
Henderson	7.7	12.4	Three Kids Mine	Closed since 1961; access via a gated service road
Lake Mead National Recreation Area	8.0	12.9	Lakeshore Road east	Eastern terminus; former SR 166 east; continuation beyond eastern terminus
1.000 mi = 1.609 km; 1.000 km = 0.621 mi: Closed/former; Proposed; Route transition
