= Paradise, Nevada =

Unincorporated town in the United States

Paradise
- Census-designated place and unincorporated town
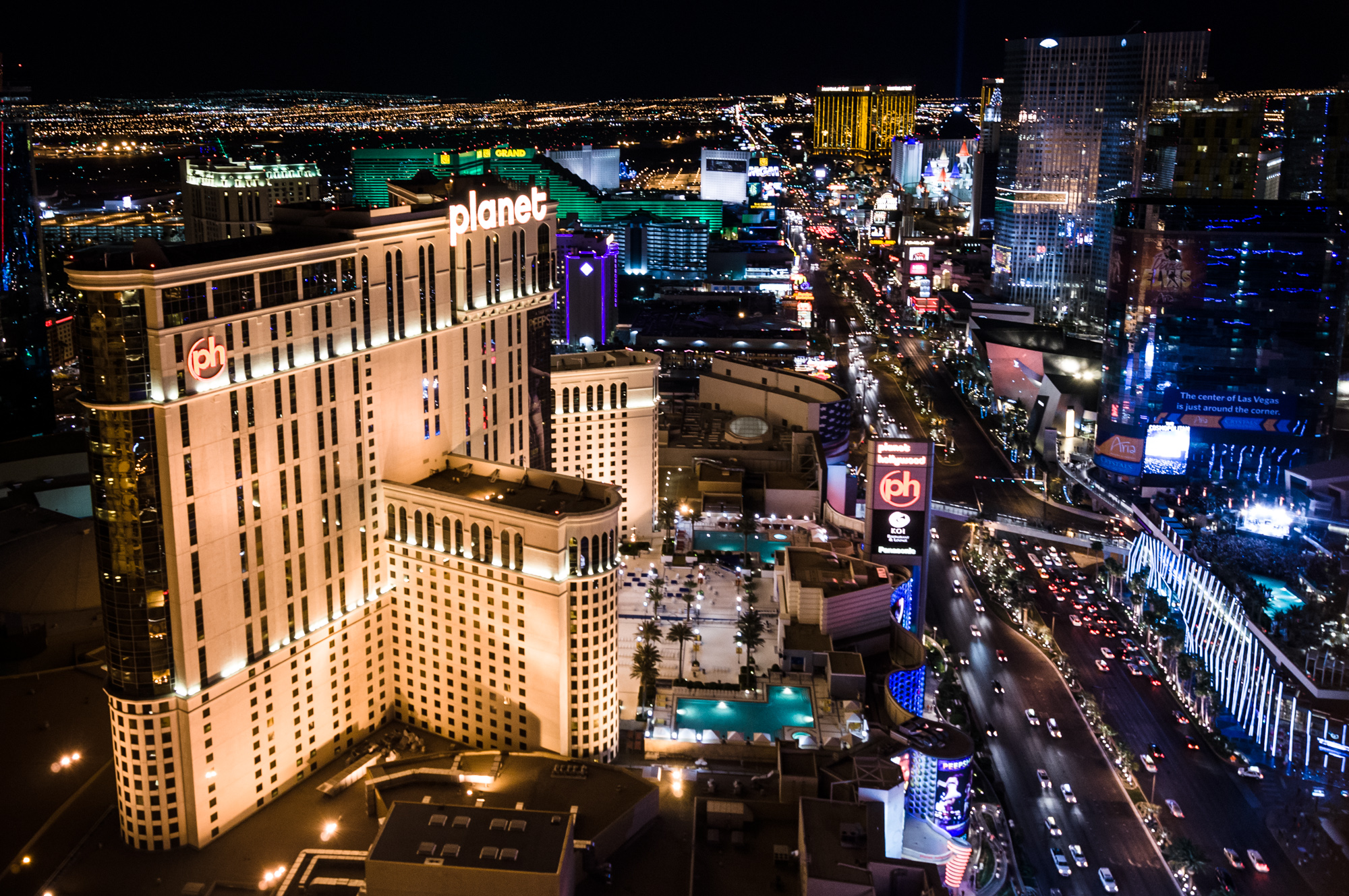
- The Las Vegas Strip, largely located within Paradise

- Location of Paradise in Clark County, Nevada

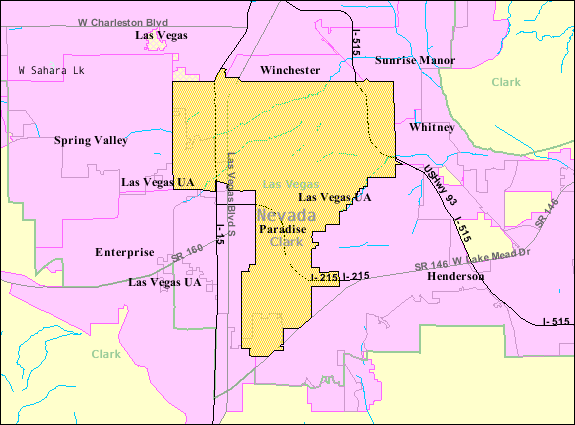
- Coordinates: 36°4′55″N 115°7′29″W
- Country: United States
- State: Nevada
- County: Clark
- Founded: December 8, 1950; 75 years ago
- Founder: Clark County Commission
- Named for: Paradise Valley

Area
  - Total: 42.41 sq mi (109.83 km^{2})
  - Land: 42.41 sq mi (109.83 km^{2})
  - Water: 0 sq mi (0.00 km^{2})
- Elevation: 2,057 ft (627 m)

Population (2020)
  - Total: 191,238
  - Density: 4,509.9/sq mi (1,741.28/km^{2})
- Time zone: UTC−08:00 (PST)
  - Summer (DST): UTC−07:00 (PDT)
- Area codes: 702 and 725
- FIPS code: 32-54600
- GNIS feature ID: 0845094
- Website: clarkcountynv.gov/paradise

Paradise is an unincorporated town and census-designated place (CDP) in Clark County, Nevada, United States, adjacent to the city of Las Vegas. It was formed on December 8, 1950. Its population was 191,238 at the 2020 census, making it the fifth-most-populous CDP in the United States; if it were an incorporated city, it would be the fifth-largest in Nevada. As an unincorporated town, it is governed by the Clark County Commission with input from the Paradise Town Advisory Board.

Paradise contains Harry Reid International Airport; the University of Nevada, Las Vegas (UNLV); the majority of the Las Vegas Strip; and most of the tourist attractions in the Las Vegas area (excluding downtown). However, all Paradise addresses, as well as other unincorporated areas in the Las Vegas Valley, have "Las Vegas" addresses.

== History ==
The southern part of the Las Vegas Valley was referred to as Paradise Valley as early as 1910, owing to a high water table that made the land particularly fertile for farming. County commissioners established a Paradise school district in 1914.

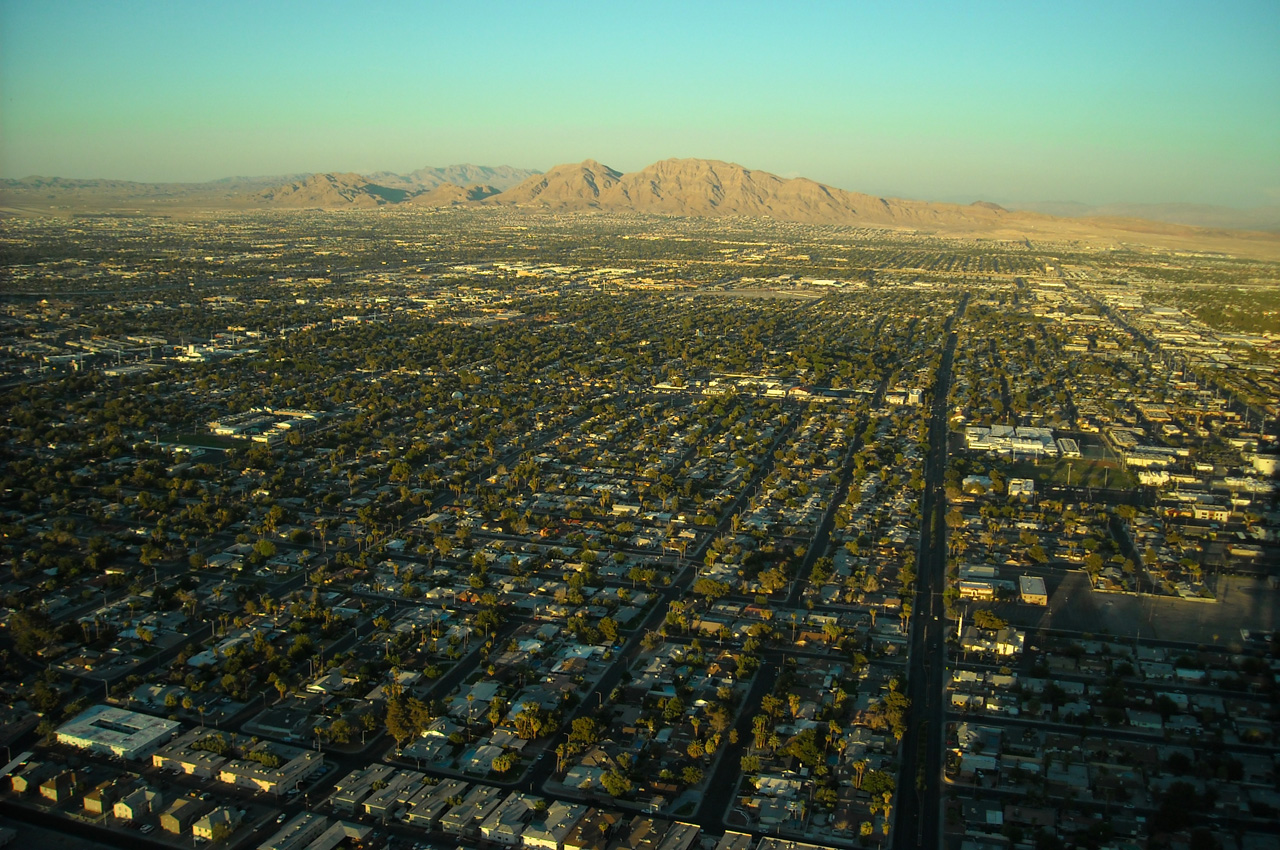
Neighborhoods on the east side of Paradise

In 1950, Mayor Ernie Cragin of Las Vegas sought to annex the Las Vegas Strip, which was unincorporated territory, to expand the city's tax base to fund his ambitious building agenda and pay down the city's rising debt. A group of casino executives, led by Gus Greenbaum of the Flamingo, lobbied the county commissioners for town status, which would prevent the city from annexing the land without the commission's approval. The commission voted to create the unincorporated town of Paradise on December 8, 1950. The town encompassed a strip one mile (1.6 km) wide and four miles (6.4 km) long, from the southern city limits of Las Vegas to just south of the Flamingo. The town board initially consisted of five casino managers, chaired by Greenbaum.

A month after its establishment, the town was expanded to include the residential areas of Paradise Valley, giving it a total area of 54 square miles (140 km^{2}). Months later, however, county officials reportedly had determined that the town had not been properly established because the petition for the town's formation had an insufficient number of signatures and because it had violated a state law forbidding formation of a town spanning multiple school districts. On August 20, 1951, county commissioners accepted petitions to create two new towns covering the area of the putative town. Town "A" of Paradise included the areas that lay within a Las Vegas school district, extending from the city limits to a point one mile south, while Town "B" included the areas within the Paradise school district.

In 1953, Town A was renamed as Winchester, and Town B became known simply as Paradise.

In 1975, Nevada enacted a law that would have incorporated Paradise (along with Sunrise Manor and Winchester) into the City of Las Vegas. Before it could take effect, however, the bill was struck down as unconstitutional by the Nevada Supreme Court.

=== MGM Grand fire of 1980 ===
The deadliest fire that occurred in the entire Las Vegas Valley was the MGM Grand fire on November 21, 1980. In the early morning hours, a deli counter had an electrical short that resulted in a fire in the walls of the hotel. The MGM Grand was built to the fire code of 1973, which did not require sprinkler systems, so sprinklers were only installed in the kitchens and theater. The fire traveled in the walls of the hotel, damaging the fire alarm system. As the fire burned, toxic smoke entered the ventilation system, traveling to the rooms of the hotel. Guests broke windows to get fresh air while waiting for rescue from firemen. Eighty-five people died in the fire, with two more dying later, bringing the death toll to 87. In addition to those who died, nearly 700 people were injured in the fire. This fire contributed to a widespread change in the requirements for fire safety in hotels.

=== Las Vegas shooting ===
On October 1, 2017, the deadliest mass shooting in the United States by a lone gunman occurred in Paradise when 64-year-old Stephen Paddock opened fire on the crowd attending the Route 91 Harvest music festival on the Strip from his 32nd-floor suite in the Mandalay Bay hotel. He fired more than 1,000 rounds, killing 60 people and wounding at least 413 others. The ensuing panic brought the total number of injured to about 867. Around an hour later, he was found dead in his room from a self-inflicted gunshot wound.

=== Cybertruck explosion ===
On January 1, 2025, around 8:39 am (PST), an improvised explosive device exploded in a Tesla Cybertruck parked outside the main entrance of the Trump International Hotel Las Vegas in Paradise. The driver and alleged perpetrator was Matthew Alan Livelsberger, an American-born, active-duty United States Army Special Forces soldier from Colorado Springs, Colorado. He was on leave from overseas duty and died from a self-inflicted gunshot wound to the head immediately before the explosion. Seven bystanders were injured by the blast. Authorities found that the vehicle contained firework mortars and gas canisters, which had fueled the explosion and fire. Per a note from Livelsberger, "the explosion was a stunt meant to be a 'wake up call' for the nation's troubles".

== Geography ==
According to the United States Census Bureau, the census-designated place (CDP) of Paradise (which may not coincide exactly with the town boundaries) has a total area of 46.7 square miles (121 km^{2}), all of it land.

The official town boundaries are bordered by Desert Inn Road to the north, Nellis Boulevard to the east, Sunset Road to the south and Decatur Boulevard to the west. There is a southern finger between Bermuda Road and Eastern Avenue south to Silverado Ranch Boulevard. South of Russell Road, the eastern border stairsteps on a rough 45-degree angle toward the corner of Eastern and Robindale Road, and there is an additional finger surrounding Interstate 215 east to St. Rose Parkway.

== Demographics ==
Historical population
Census	Pop.	Note	%±
1970	24,477		—
1980	84,818		246.5%
1990	124,682		47.0%
2000	186,070		49.2%
2010	223,167		19.9%
2020	191,238		−14.3%

=== 2020 census ===
As of the 2020 census, Paradise had a population of 191,238. The median age was 39.0 years. 19.0% of residents were under the age of 18 and 15.5% were 65 years of age or older. For every 100 females there were 105.6 males, and for every 100 females age 18 and over there were 105.3 males age 18 and over.

100.0% of residents lived in urban areas, while 0.0% lived in rural areas.

There were 80,732 households in Paradise, of which 23.9% had children under the age of 18 living in them. Of all households, 30.6% were married-couple households, 30.8% were households with a male householder and no spouse or partner present, and 29.4% were households with a female householder and no spouse or partner present. About 36.2% of all households were made up of individuals and 10.9% had someone living alone who was 65 years of age or older.

There were 94,690 housing units, of which 14.7% were vacant. The homeowner vacancy rate was 1.8% and the rental vacancy rate was 15.3%.

Racial composition as of the 2020 census
Race	Number	Percent
White	80,445	42.1%
Black or African American	25,673	13.4%
American Indian and Alaska Native	2,321	1.2%
Asian	18,804	9.8%
Native Hawaiian and Other Pacific Islander	2,244	1.2%
Some other race	32,831	17.2%
Two or more races	28,920	15.1%
Hispanic or Latino (of any race)	64,116	33.5%

Non-Hispanic Whites accounted for 36.6% of the population.

=== 2010 census ===
As of the census of 2010, there were 223,167 people residing in Paradise. The racial makeup was 59.8% White, 10.0% African American, 0.8% Native American, 9.5% Asian, 1.0% Pacific Islander, and 5.5% from two or more races. Hispanic or Latino residents made up 31.2% of the population, and 46.3% of the population was non-Hispanic White.

=== 2000 census ===
As of the census of 2000, there were 186,070 people, 77,209 households, and 43,314 families residing in the CDP. The population density was 3,947.3 inhabitants per square mile (1,524.1/km^{2}). There were 85,398 housing units at an average density of 1,811.6 per square mile (699.5/km^{2}). The racial makeup of the CDP was 72.51% White, 6.59% African American, 0.77% Native American, 6.52% Asian, 0.59% Pacific Islander, 8.37% from other races, and 4.65% from two or more races. Hispanic or Latino of any race were 23.47% of the population.

== Places of interest ==
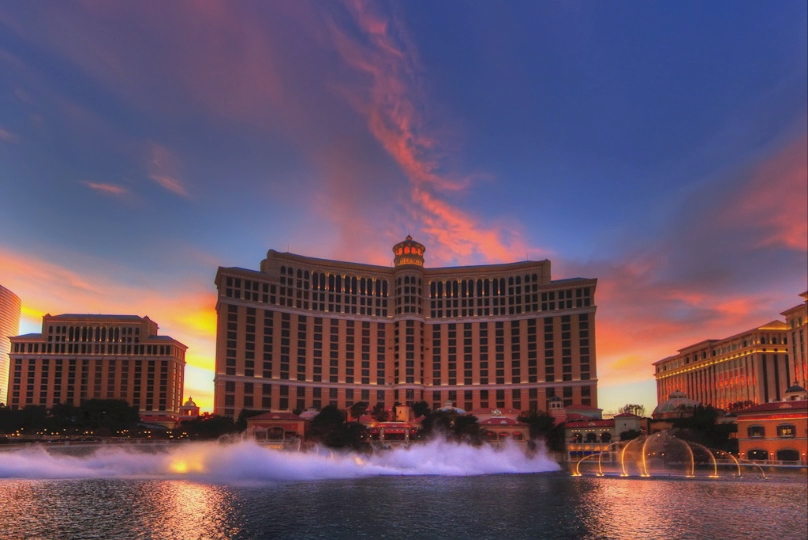
The Bellagio at dusk

- Akhob by James Turrell
- Allegiant Stadium
- The Art of Richard MacDonald
- Bellagio Conservatory & Botanical Gardens
- Bellagio Gallery of Fine Art
- Bliss Dance
- Bodies: The Exhibition
- High Roller
- Las Vegas Little Theater
- Las Vegas Philharmonic Orchestra
- Liberace Museum
- Marjorie Barrick Museum of Art
- Martin Lawrence Galleries
- National Atomic Testing Museum
- Nevada Ballet Theatre
- P3 Art Studio
- T-Mobile Arena
- Titanic: The Artifact Exhibition
- Shark Reef Aquarium
- Sphere
- Welcome to Las Vegas sign

== Education ==
The Clark County School District serves Paradise, as well as the rest of Clark County.

Paradise is home to the University of Nevada, Las Vegas.

== Transportation ==
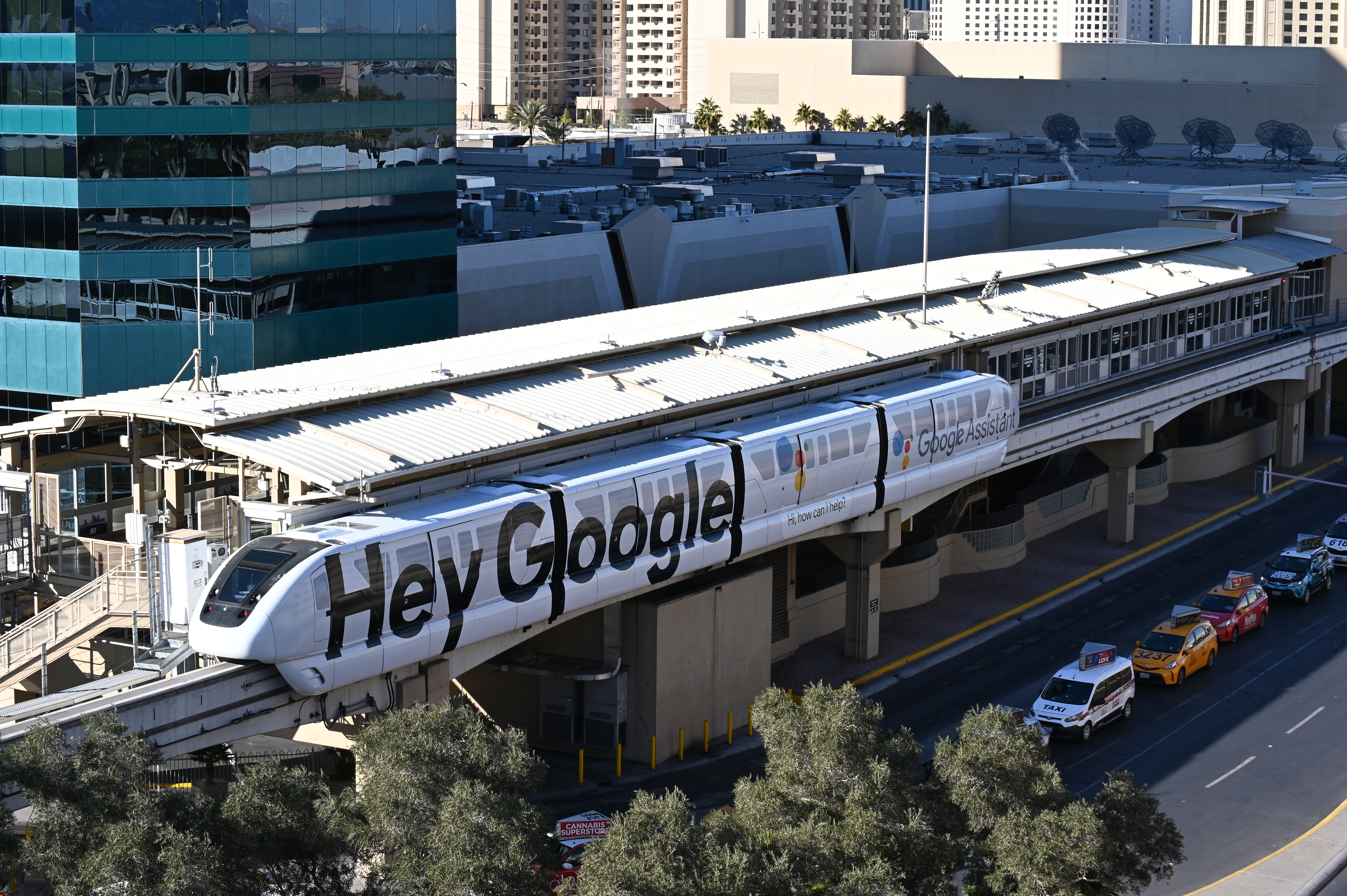
Las Vegas Monorail MGM Grand Station

Harry Reid International Airport (formerly McCarran International Airport) is in Paradise.

Paradise also has multiple casinos connected to the Las Vegas Monorail. The monorail ends at the MGM Grand Monorail Station in Paradise.

Paradise is also served by the Regional Transportation Commission of Southern Nevada by bus routes both on and off the Las Vegas Strip.

== Sports ==
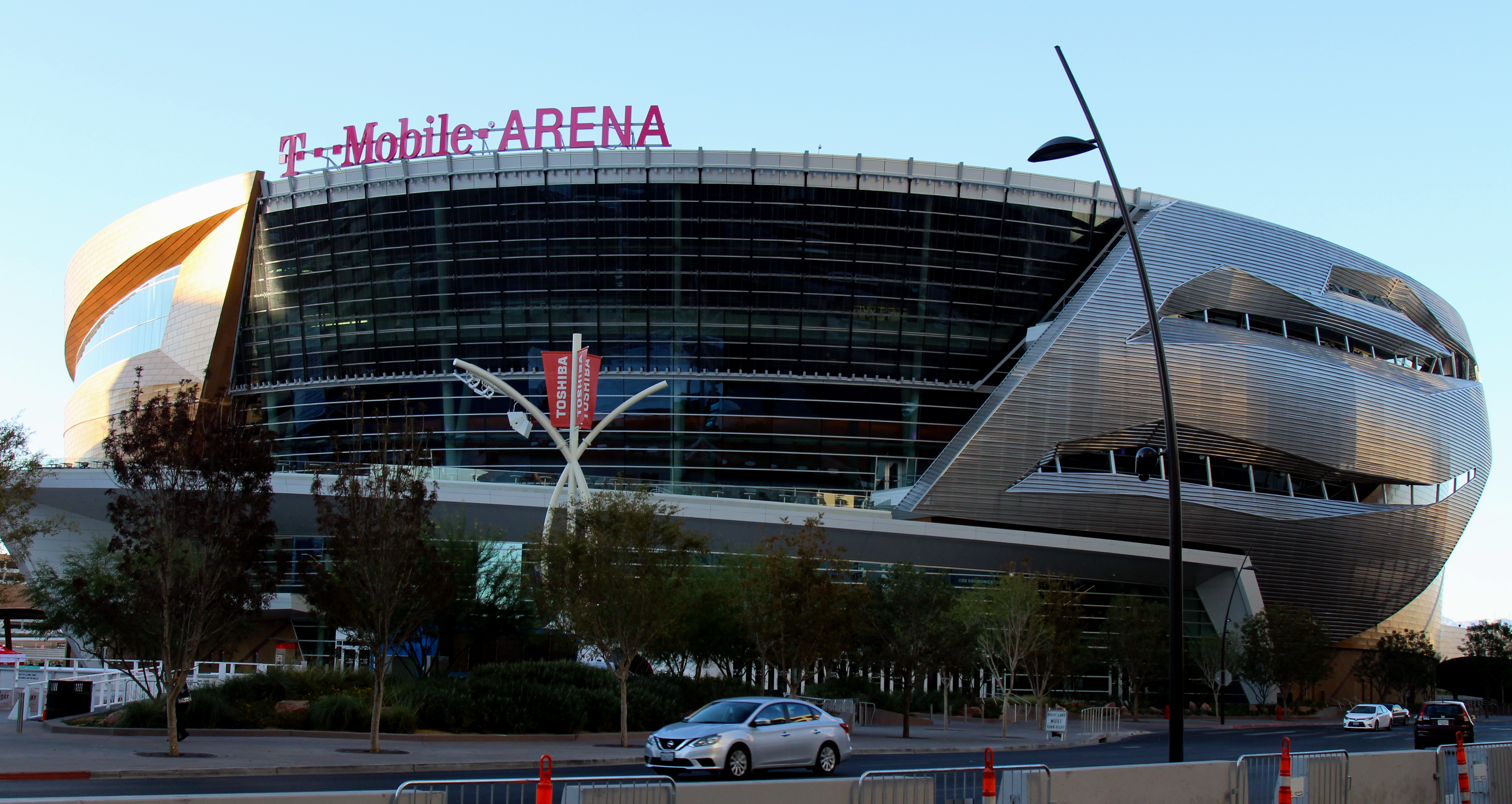
T-Mobile Arena

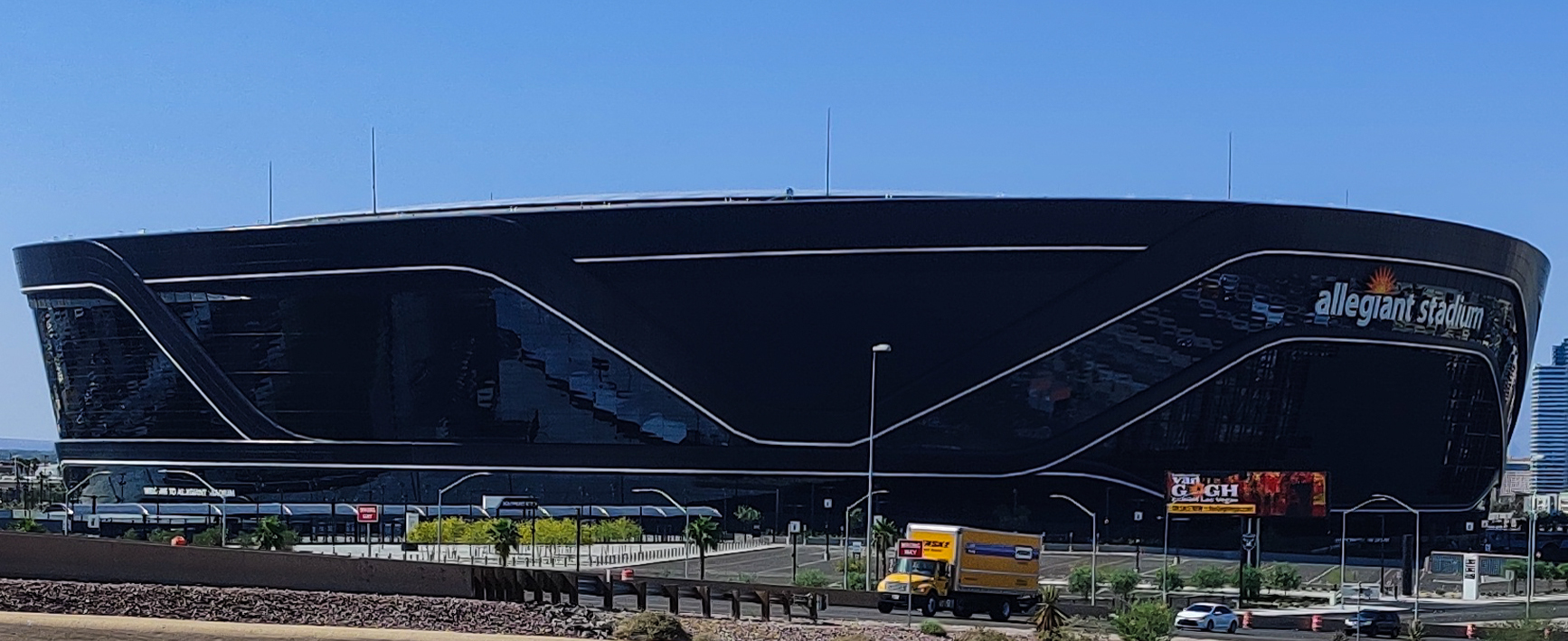
Allegiant Stadium

Paradise is home to Las Vegas's three major league sports teams: the Vegas Golden Knights of the National Hockey League (NHL), which play at T-Mobile Arena, the Las Vegas Raiders of the National Football League (NFL) which play at Allegiant Stadium, and the Las Vegas Aces of the WNBA which play at Michelob Ultra Arena. Super Bowl LVIII in 2024 and Super Bowl LXIII in 2029 was played at Allegiant Stadium. Paradise will be the future home of the Athletics of Major League Baseball (MLB) at a yet-to-be-named new stadium being built at the site of the former Tropicana Las Vegas. The Vegas Vanguards of the PWHL will also play in Paradise, at T-Mobile Arena, sharing it with the Golden Knights.

As UNLV is located in Paradise, most of its various teams play in the town limits. The UNLV Rebels football program plays at Allegiant Stadium, and the Runnin' Rebels and Lady Rebels play at Thomas & Mack Center and in the Cox Pavilion respectively.

Also, since 2004, the Las Vegas Summer League, organized by the National Basketball Association (NBA), is played in the Thomas & Mack Center and in the Cox Pavilion. Many NCAA College Basketball Tournament conferences are also hosted at the Thomas & Mack Center in March every year.

Since 1985, almost every December, the National Finals Rodeo has been held at the Thomas & Mack Center. The one exception was in 2020, when the event was held in Arlington, Texas, at Globe Life Field due to public health concerns during the COVID-19 pandemic. The contract extension signed in June 2024 means that the finals will continue to be held at the Thomas & Mack Center until at least 2035.

Paradise has hosted the Formula One Las Vegas Grand Prix, held on a street circuit including part of the Las Vegas Strip, since 2023.

Paradise has also been the site of many prominent combat sports events, such as boxing and MMA, with Las Vegas being considered by many as the "fight capital of the world."

== See also ==
- Las Vegas Strip
- Las Vegas Valley
- Clark County, Nevada
- Las Vegas Monorail
- Paradise (2013 film)
