= Nevada State Route 159 =

Highway in Nevada

State Route 159

- SR 159, highlighted in red

Route information
- Maintained by NDOT
- Length: 19.180 mi (30.867 km)
- Existed: July 1, 1976–present

Major junctions
- West end: SR 160 in Blue Diamond
- Future I-215 / CC 215 at Las Vegas–Summerlin South line; I-15 in Las Vegas; I-11 / US 93 / US 95 at Las Vegas–Sunrise Manor line
- East end: SR 612 at the Las Vegas–Sunrise Manor line

Location
- Country: United States
- State: Nevada
- County: Clark

Highway system
- Nevada State Highway System; Interstate; US; State; Pre‑1976; Scenic
← SR 158	→ SR 160

State Route 159 (SR 159) is a 19.180-mile (30.867 km) east–west highway in Clark County, Nevada, United States, providing access to Red Rock Canyon and formerly serving as a thoroughfare in the Las Vegas Valley. A portion of the west end of the route is designated a Nevada Scenic Byway.

== Route description ==
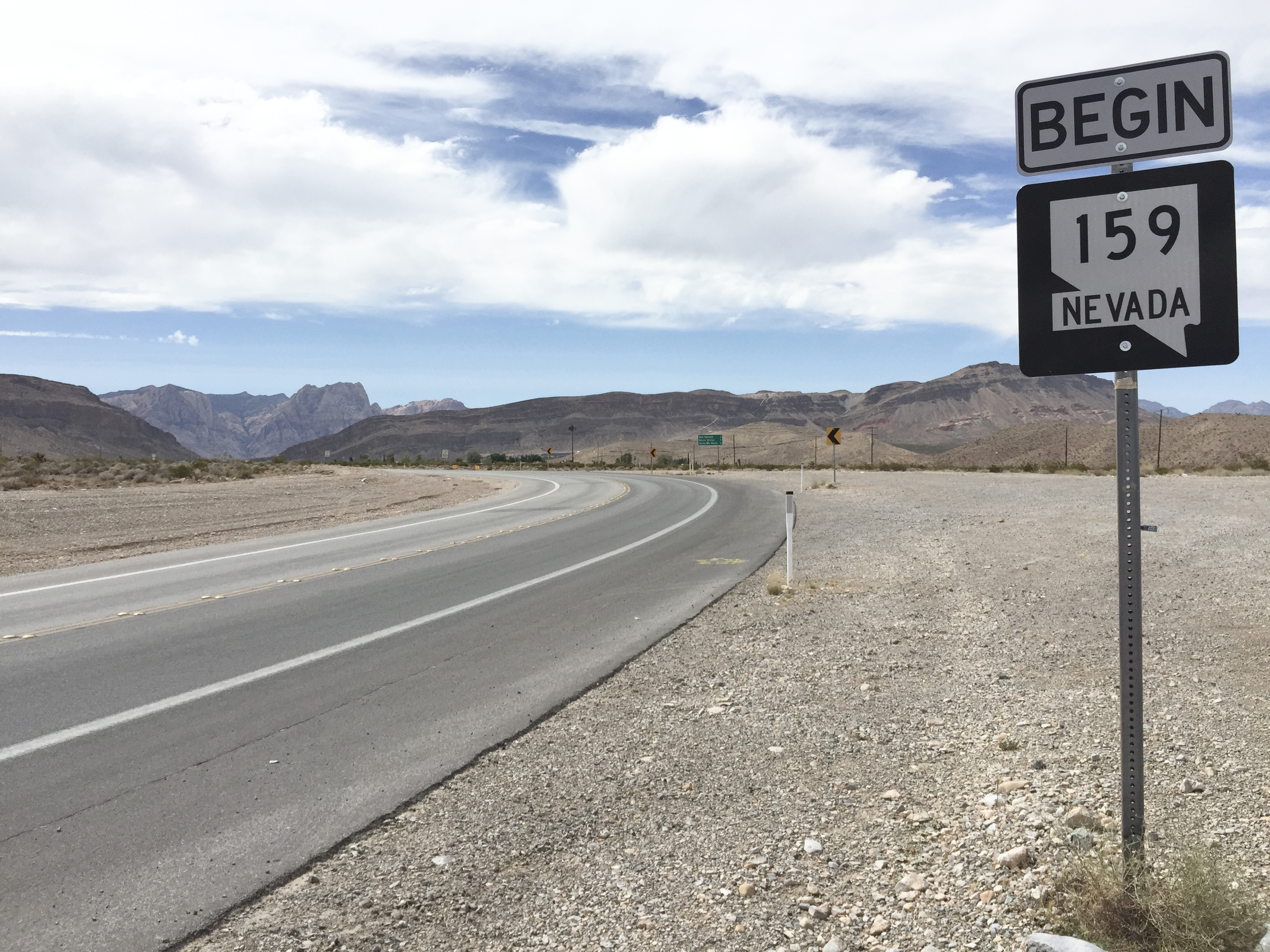
View from the western end of SR 159 looking eastbound as seen in 2015

SR 159 has two distinct segments. The first segment is a rural two-lane highway that begins at its junction with SR 160 (Pahrump Valley Highway, Blue Diamond Road) and Erskine Junction Way. From here, two things happen. First, the designation Blue Diamond Road continues onto SR 159. Second, the highway proceeds northwesterly through the town of Blue Diamond toward Spring Mountain Ranch State Park. The last signs for Blue Diamond Road can be found at an at-grade intersection with Castalia Street. After this intersection, SR 159 is officially known as Red Rock Canyon Road, despite the name being completely unsigned. From there, the highway curves northeastward around Red Rock Canyon to the Las Vegas city limits west of the Las Vegas Beltway. As it enters the census-designated place of Summerlin South, SR 159 transitions into its second—and disconnected—segment: a major section-line arterial road of the Las Vegas Valley. An at-grade intersection with Sky Vista Drive reveals the first signblades for Charleston Boulevard. The western section of SR 159 ends at an interchange with the Las Vegas Beltway (CC 215).

State Route 159 resumes at an incomplete interchange with Martin Luther King Boulevard and Charleston Boulevard. It then provides access to I-15 via a grade-separated interchange. Next, SR 159 intersects Industrial Road and South Grand Central Parkway, the latter providing access to the North Premium Outlets. Finally, the central portion of SR 159 ends at an intersection of Commerce Street.

State Route 159 resumes again at 25th Street, just east of the northwestern terminus of SR 582 as Fremont Street. It then heads due east, mostly along the border of Las Vegas and Sunrise Manor, serving as the north–south axis for street addresses. SR 159 reaches its eastern terminus at Nellis Boulevard (SR 612). (Note: Charleston Boulevard itself ends at a turning circle about 2.5 mi (4.0 km) east of Nellis Blvd near Frenchman Mountain.)

== History ==
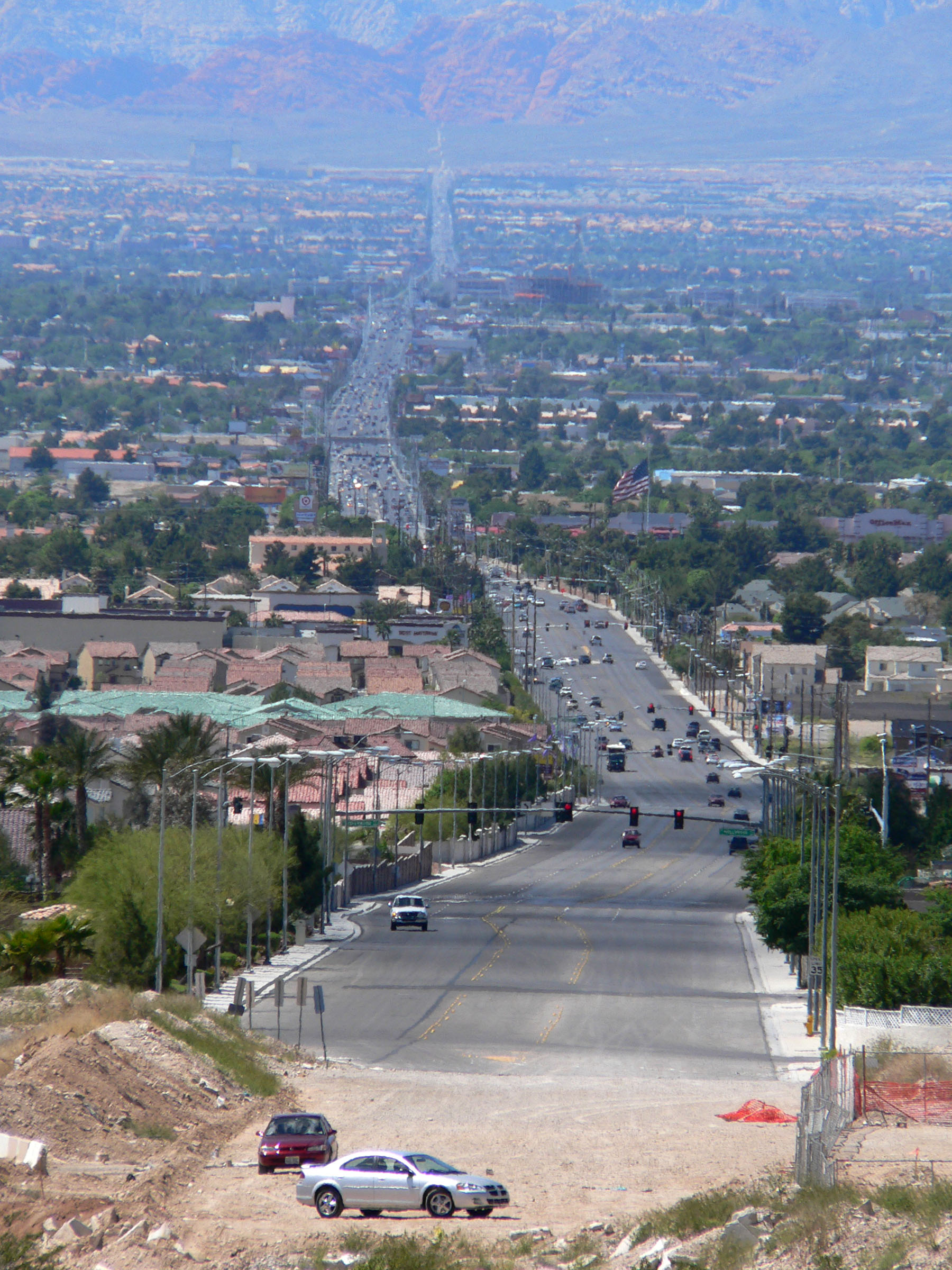
Looking west down the entire length of Charleston Boulevard, from the slopes of Frenchman Mountain as seen in 2005

A portion of Charleston Boulevard was previously designated US 95 Alternate to bypass Downtown Las Vegas. The designation began at Fremont Street (SR 582) and continued westward to Rancho Drive (SR 599), where it curved northward to reconnect to US 95. The alternate route was discontinued in 1982.

Approximately 8.8 miles (14.2 km) of SR 159 in Red Rock Canyon was designated a Nevada Scenic Byway on June 30, 1995.

== Major intersections ==
The entire route is in Clark County.

Location	mi	km	Destinations	Notes
Blue Diamond	0.000	0.000	Erskine Junction Way	Continuation beyond counterclockwise terminus
Blue Diamond	0.000	0.000	SR 160 – Las Vegas, Pahrump	Counterclockwise terminus
Las Vegas–Summerlin South line	15.833	25.481	Future I-215 / CC 215 (Bruce Woodbury Beltway)	Interchange; CC 215 exit 26
Gap in route
Las Vegas	15.833	25.481	Martin L. King Boulevard	Interchange; eastbound left exit and westbound entrance
Las Vegas			I-15 – Los Angeles, Salt Lake City	Interchange; I-15 exit 41
Las Vegas			Grand Central Parkway	Provides access to Las Vegas Premium Outlets North.
Las Vegas	16.170	26.023	Commerce Street	
Gap in route
Las Vegas–Sunrise Manor line	16.170	26.023	25th Street	SR 159 resumes here. No access to 25th Street from Charleston Boulevard eastbound.
Las Vegas–Sunrise Manor line			I-11 / US 93 / US 95	Interchange; I-11/US 95 exit 72; former I-515
Las Vegas–Sunrise Manor line	19.180	30.867	SR 612 (Nellis Boulevard)	Clockwise terminus
Las Vegas–Sunrise Manor line	19.180	30.867	Charleston Boulevard east	Continuation beyond clockwise terminus
1.000 mi = 1.609 km; 1.000 km = 0.621 mi: Incomplete access

== Public transport ==
Current RTC Route 206 functions on this road.
