= Nevada State Route 146 =

Highway in Nevada

State Route 146
- Saint Rose Parkway
- Nevada State Route 146, highlighted in red.

Route information
- Maintained by NDOT
- Length: 6.622 mi (10.657 km)
- Existed: July 1, 1976–present
- NHS: Entire route

Major junctions
- West end: Southern Highlands Parkway in Enterprise
- I-15 in Enterprise
- East end: I-215 / Pecos Road in Henderson

Location
- Country: United States
- State: Nevada
- County: Clark

Highway system
- Nevada State Highway System; Interstate; US; State; Pre‑1976; Scenic
← SR 140	→ SR 147

State Route 146 (SR 146) is a 6.673-mile-long (10.739 km) major east–west state highway in the southern part of the U.S. state of Nevada. It begins at an intersection with Southern Highlands Parkway, just west of the Exit 27 interchange on Interstate 15 (I-15). It ends at the Pecos Road (exit 6) interchange on I-215 in Henderson. The highway is known as Saint Rose Parkway, but it was known as Lake Mead Drive before 2001.

== History ==
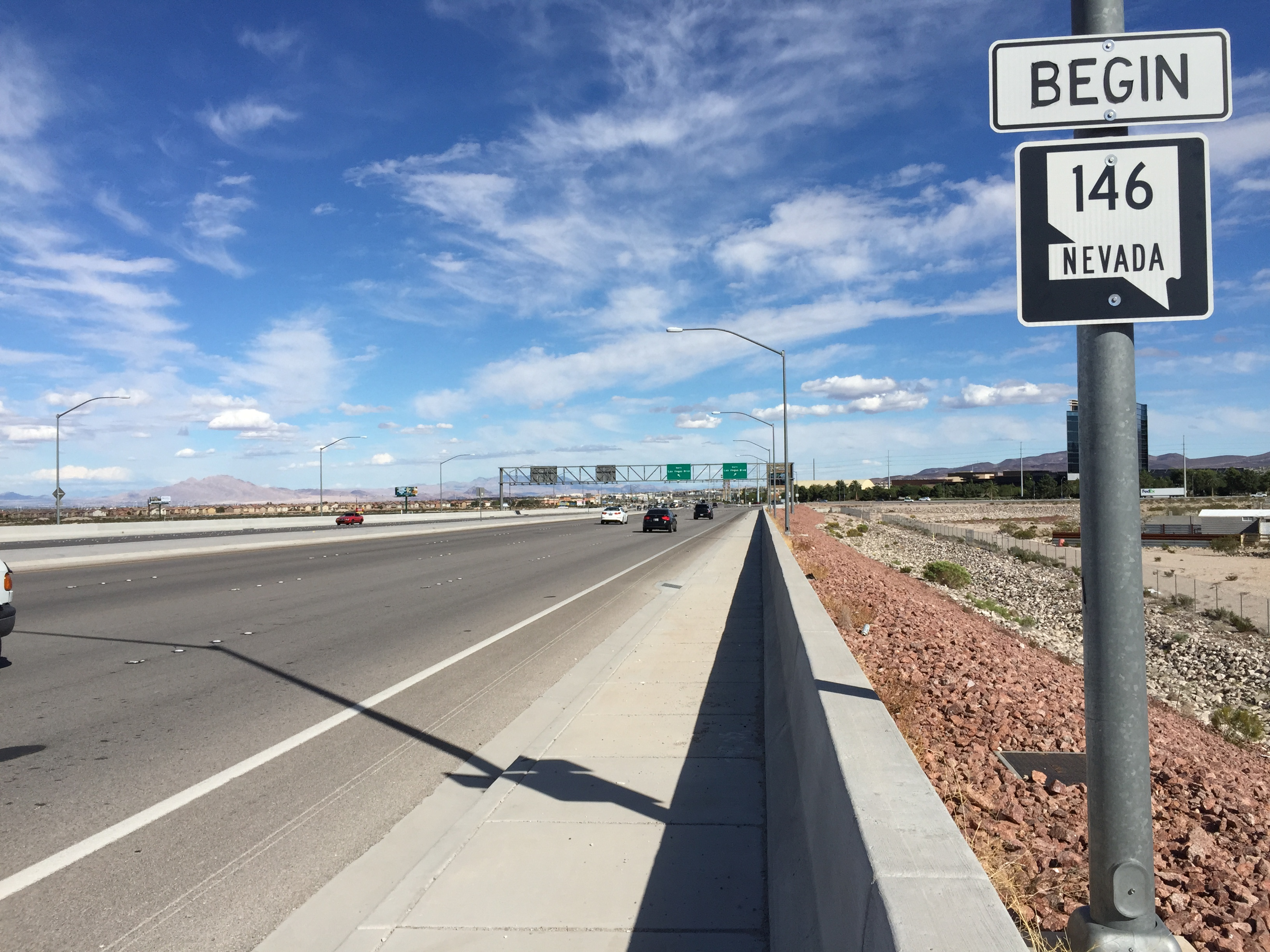
View from the west end of SR 146 looking eastbound as seen in 2015

The original segment of SR 146 was known as State Route 41 (Lake Mead Drive) until the early-1980s. Originally, it was a 19 mi (31 km) route that began at the current western terminus at Interstate 15 and crossed Boulder Highway in Henderson before ending at the intersection of North Shore Road near Lake Mead.

Construction of I-215 through southeast Las Vegas and Henderson altered the routing of SR 146. Clark County decided to build I-215 between Mile 6 (St. Rose Parkway/Pecos Road) and Mile 0 (the Interstate 515/U.S. Route 93/U.S. Route 95 interchange) on the SR 146 alignment. Since the Nevada Department of Transportation (NDOT) does not co-sign state routes along Interstate highways, the decision was made in 1999 to officially truncate SR 146 to its current eastern terminus. The portion of the highway east of I-515/US 93/US 95 was recommissioned as State Route 564 (and has since been renamed Lake Mead Parkway). Clark County posted SR 146 signs along the 6-mile (9.7 km) overlapping section of I-215, even though the state highway designation no longer existed in this section when the freeway was completed in 2001—Many SR 146 signs still remained on I-215 in 2007, but have since been removed.

== Major intersections ==
The entire route is in Clark County.

Location	mi	km	Destinations	Notes
Enterprise	0.000	0.000	Southern Highlands Parkway	Western terminus
Enterprise	0.000	0.000	I-15 (Las Vegas Freeway) – Los Angeles, Salt Lake City	Interchange; I-15 exit 27
Enterprise			Las Vegas Boulevard	Former SR 604/US 91/US 466
Henderson	6.622	10.657	I-215 (Bruce Woodbury Beltway)	Interchange; eastern terminus; I-215 exit 6; former SR 146 east
Henderson	6.622	10.657	Pecos Road	Continuation beyond eastern terminus
1.000 mi = 1.609 km; 1.000 km = 0.621 mi
