= Nevada State Route 562 =

Highway in Nevada

State Route 562
- Sunset Road
- SR 562 highlighted in red, remainder of Sunset Road in blue

Route information
- Maintained by NDOT
- Length: 4.475 mi (7.202 km)
- Existed: July 1, 1976–present

Major junctions
- West end: Las Vegas Boulevard at the Enterprise–Paradise line
- SR 171 to I-215 in Paradise
- East end: Annie Oakley Drive at Paradise–Henderson line

Location
- Country: United States
- State: Nevada
- County: Clark

Highway system
- Nevada State Highway System; Interstate; US; State; Pre‑1976; Scenic
← SR 535	→ SR 564

State Route 562 (SR 562) is an east–west highway in the Las Vegas Valley that comprises a portion of Sunset Road.

== Route description ==
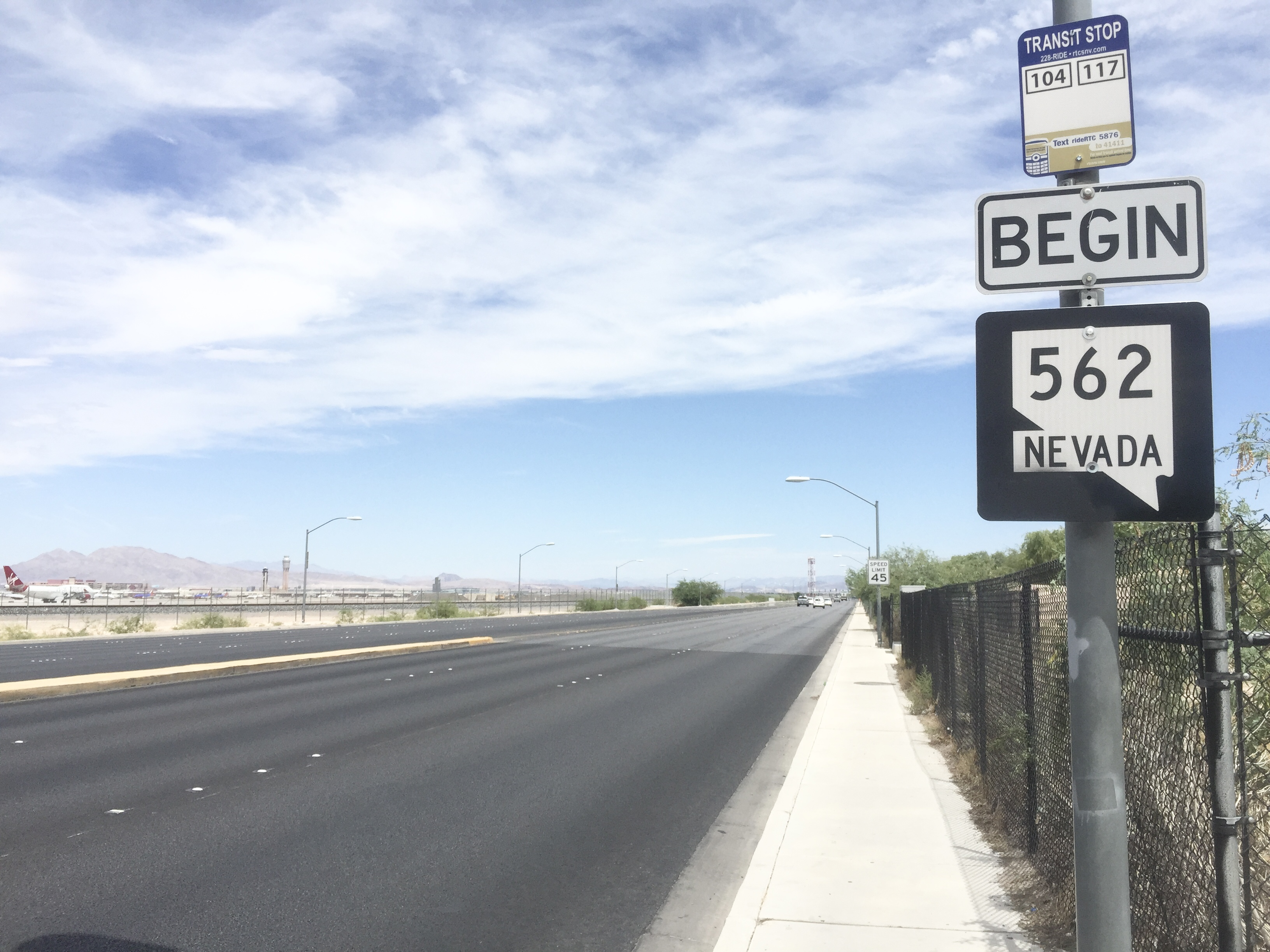
View at the west end of SR 562 looking eastbound as seen in 2015

SR 562 begins at the intersection of Sunset Road and Las Vegas Boulevard (former SR 604/US 91/US 466). The highway heads east, skirting the southern edge of the Harry Reid International Airport runways, to an end at the city limits of Henderson at Annie Oakley Drive.

As part of I-15 south construction, an overpass was constructed for Sunset Road over I-15, which didn't exist previously. It is now continuous between Valley View Boulevard and Las Vegas Boulevard.

== History ==
State Route 562 originally ran east to Boulder Highway (SR 582) in Henderson. By June 2002, the portion between Annie Oakley Drive and Gibson Road was relinquished to the city of Henderson, leaving two segments of SR 562. By 2017, the eastern segment had been turned over to local control.

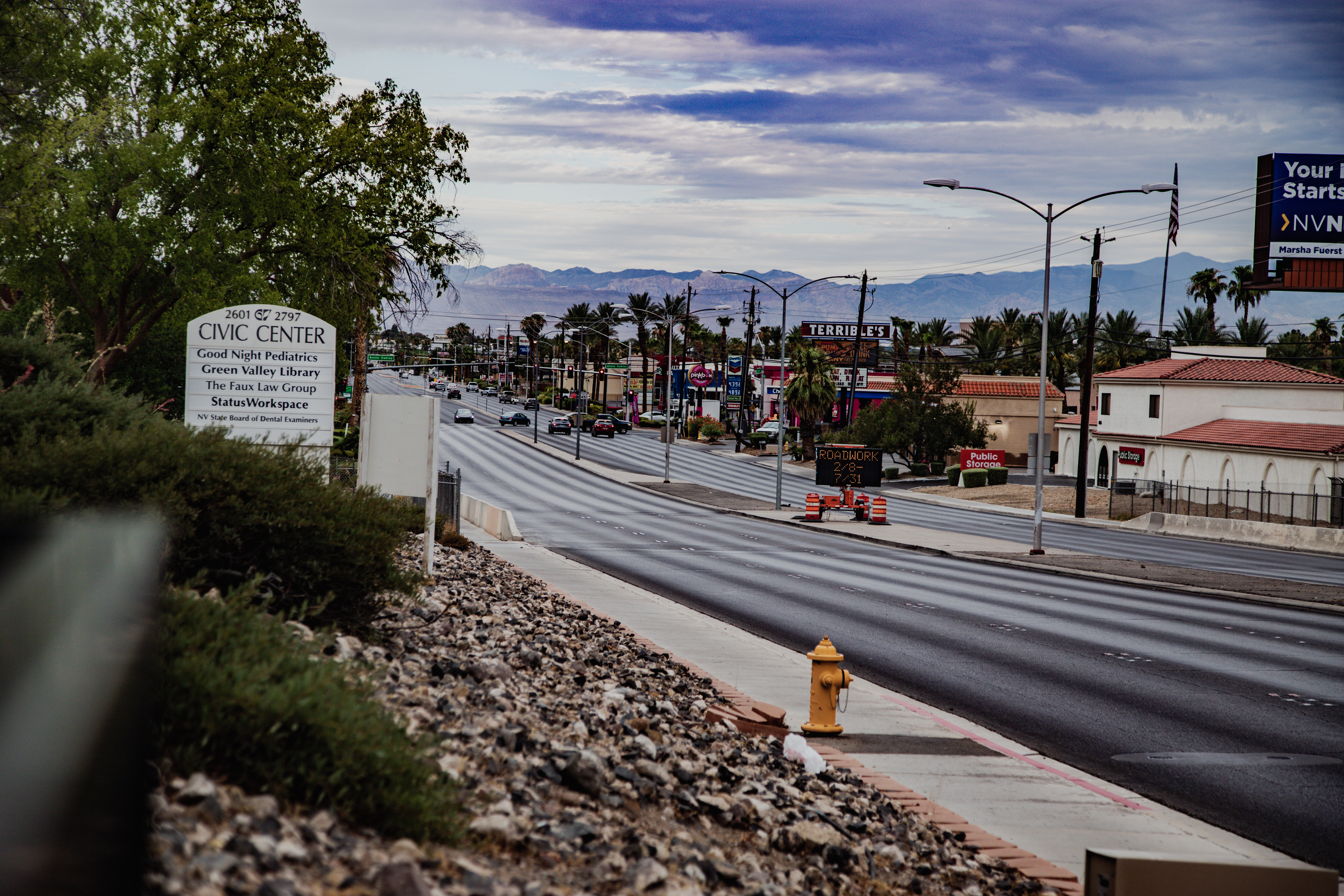
The east end of SR 562 at Annie Oakley Drive looking westbound.

== Major intersections ==
The entire route is in Clark County.

Location	mi	km	Destinations	Notes
Enterprise–Paradise line	0.000	0.000	Sunset Road west	Continuation beyond western terminus
Enterprise–Paradise line	0.000	0.000	Las Vegas Boulevard	Western terminus; former SR 604/US 91/US 466
Paradise			I-215	Accessed via Harry Reid Airport Connector (including unsigned SR 171); northbound exit and southbound entrance
Henderson	4.475	7.202	Annie Oakley Drive	Eastern terminus
Henderson	4.475	7.202	Sunset Road east	Continuation beyond eastern terminus; former SR 562 east
1.000 mi = 1.609 km; 1.000 km = 0.621 mi

== Public transport ==
RTC Transit Route 212 functions on this road.
