= Summerlin South, Nevada =

- CDP
- Location of Summerlin South in Clark County, Nevada

- Location within Nevada Location within the United States
- Coordinates: 36°7′35″N 115°19′58″W
- Country: United States
- State: Nevada
- County: Clark

Government
  - Type: County Commission
  - County Commissioner: Justin Jones (D)

Area
  - Total: 9.68 sq mi (25.08 km^{2})
  - Land: 9.68 sq mi (25.08 km^{2})
  - Water: 0 sq mi (0.00 km^{2})

Population (2020)
  - Total: 30,744
  - Density: 3,174.5/sq mi (1,225.67/km^{2})
- Time zone: UTC−8 (PST)
  - Summer (DST): UTC−7 (PDT)
- Area codes: 702 and 725
- FIPS code: 32-70900
- GNIS feature ID: 2410017

Summerlin South, also seen on maps as South Summerlin, is a census-designated place (CDP) in Clark County, Nevada, United States, on the western edge of the Las Vegas Valley and adjacent to the Red Rock Canyon National Conservation Area. It is named because it is a southward extension of the master-planned community of Summerlin. Nearly all of Summerlin South is in ZIP code 89135. The population was 30,744 at the 2020 Census.

The Summerlin South Community Association is the main management entity of the area – it is a homeowners association for the entire community.

== Geography ==
It is bounded on the north by Charleston Boulevard, Hualapai Way to the east and Red Rock Canyon National Conservation Area to the west. Current development expands just below Russell Rd on the south but future developments will expand to Maule Ave.

The area includes The Ridges, a guard-gated community consisting of custom and semi-custom homes in southwest Summerlin. In The Ridges, the average home price is over $2,000,000.

According to the United States Census Bureau, the CDP has a total area of 9.64 square miles (24.97 km^{2}).

== Demographics ==
Historical population
Census	Pop.	Note	%±
2000	3,735		—
2010	24,085		544.8%
2020	30,744		27.6%
U.S. Decennial Census

=== 2020 census ===
As of the 2020 census, Summerlin South had a population of 30,744. The median age was 47.4 years. 19.1% of residents were under the age of 18 and 24.6% of residents were 65 years of age or older. For every 100 females there were 97.0 males, and for every 100 females age 18 and over there were 95.1 males age 18 and over.

99.7% of residents lived in urban areas, while 0.3% lived in rural areas.

There were 13,185 households in Summerlin South, of which 26.3% had children under the age of 18 living in them. Of all households, 51.7% were married-couple households, 17.9% were households with a male householder and no spouse or partner present, and 24.1% were households with a female householder and no spouse or partner present. About 27.1% of all households were made up of individuals and 12.7% had someone living alone who was 65 years of age or older.

There were 14,363 housing units, of which 8.2% were vacant. The homeowner vacancy rate was 2.4% and the rental vacancy rate was 8.5%.

Racial composition as of the 2020 census
Race	Number	Percent
White	20,656	67.2%
Black or African American	1,303	4.2%
American Indian and Alaska Native	105	0.3%
Asian	4,470	14.5%
Native Hawaiian and Other Pacific Islander	108	0.4%
Some other race	950	3.1%
Two or more races	3,152	10.3%
Hispanic or Latino (of any race)	3,399	11.1%

=== 2010 census ===
As of the census of 2010, there were 24,085 people and 10,173 households residing in the CDP. The population density was 2,497.4 inhabitants per square mile (964.3/km^{2}). The racial makeup of the CDP was 76.2% White, 4.4% African American, 0.4% Native American, 12.8% Asian, 0.4% Pacific Islander, 1.8% from other races, and 3.9% from two or more races. Hispanic or Latino of any race were 8.6% of the population.

There were 10,173 households, out of which 27.7% had children under the age of 18 living with them. 54.6% were married couples living together, and 33.3% were non-families. 25.7% of all households were made up of individuals, and 2.9% had someone living alone who was 65 years of age or older. The average household size was 2.37 and the average family size was 2.86.

In the CDP, the age distribution was 21.3% under the age of 18 and 78.7% over the age of 18. Age 65 and over made up 18% of the population. The median age was 42.9 years.

=== Income ===
Between 2011–2013, median household income was $91,535 and mean household income was $139,061.

== See also ==
- List of census-designated places in Nevada
