= Nevada State Route 607 =

Highway in Nevada

State Route 607
- Former SR 607 highlighted in red

Route information
- Maintained by NDOT
- Length: 5.237 mi (8.428 km)
- Existed: 1976–2006

Major junctions
- South end: SR 589 at Las Vegas–Winchester line
- SR 159 in Las Vegas; SR 582 in Las Vegas; I-515 / US 93 / US 95 in Las Vegas; SR 147 in North Las Vegas; SR 604 in North Las Vegas
- North end: SR 574 in North Las Vegas

Location
- Country: United States
- State: Nevada

Highway system
- Nevada State Highway System; Interstate; US; State; Pre‑1976; Scenic

State Route 607 (SR 607) was a state highway serving the Las Vegas Valley including Las Vegas and North Las Vegas, Nevada. The highway followed Eastern Avenue and Civic Center Drive. The route was turned over to local control by 2008.

SR 607 began at Sahara Avenue (SR 589) at the Las Vegas city limit. It followed Eastern Avenue northward towards Owens Avenue, where the roadway entered the city of North Las Vegas and changed names to Civic Center Drive. SR 607 continued north to pass through downtown North Las Vegas before terminating at Cheyenne Avenue (SR 574). RTC Transit Route 110 functions on this road.

North of the "Five Points" intersections with Charleston Boulevard (SR 159) and Fremont Street (SR 582), SR 607 shifted slightly eastward to run over the former 25th Street alignment as it headed towards North Las Vegas. By January 2008, the route had been completely relinquished to local control.
