= List of Nevada Scenic Byways =

Nevada Scenic Byways

System information
- Maintained by NDOT
- Length: 420 mi (680 km)
- Formed: 1983

Highway names
- Interstates: Interstate nn (I-nn)
- US Highways: US Route nn (US nn)
- State: State Route nn (SR nn)

System links
- Nevada State Highway System; Interstate; US; State; Pre‑1976; Scenic

The U.S. state of Nevada maintains a system of scenic byways throughout the state. Currently, there are 20 designated state scenic byways. Some of these state scenic byways have also been incorporated into national byway designations.

== State scenic byways ==
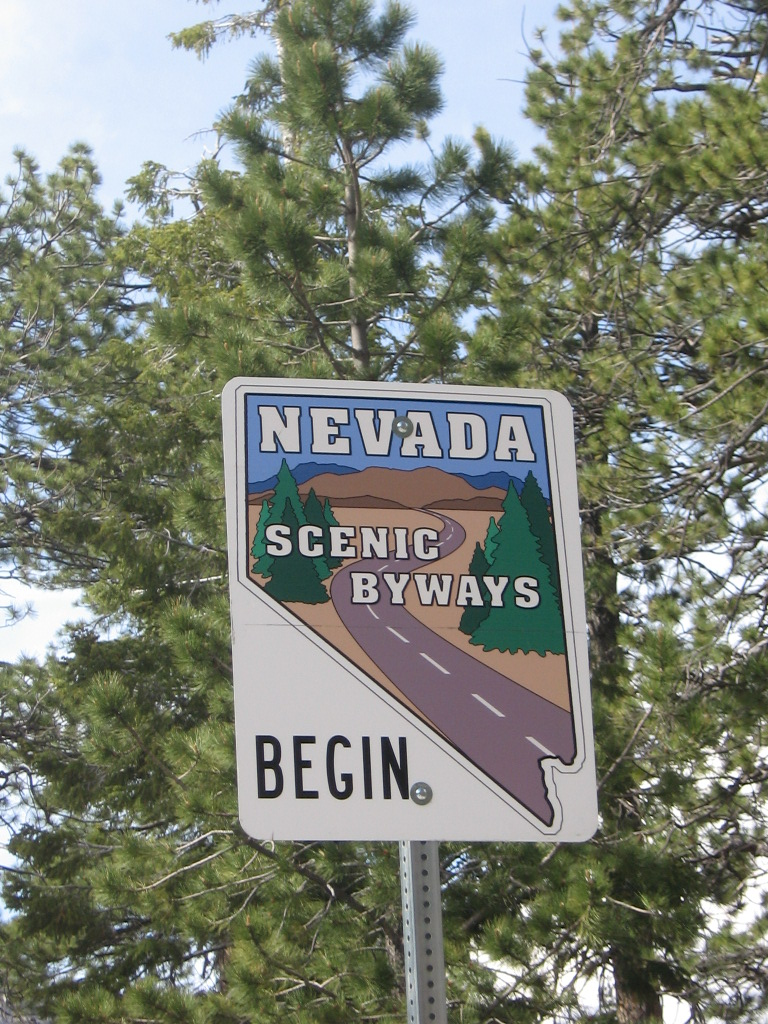

Nevada's scenic byway program was established by the Nevada Legislature in 1983. The Nevada Department of Transportation is the primary agency responsible for the program, and its director has the authority to add new byways into the system.

As of 2015, 20 road segments throughout Nevada have been designated as state scenic byways. The system comprises approximately 420 miles (680 km) of roads. Fifteen of the state's scenic byways overlap with state-maintained highways.

Roads designated as Nevada Scenic Byways
Name	Length (mi)	Length (km)	Southern or western terminus	Northern or eastern terminus	Date	Description
Angel Lake Road	11.7	18.8	Angel Lake	SR 232 in Wells	1995	Follows SR 231 as it traverses through the East Humboldt Range in Elko County towards Angel Lake.
Baker Road	11.6	18.7	Nevada–Utah state line	US 6/US 50	2000	Follows SR 487 in White Pine County via the town of Baker, providing access to Great Basin National Park.
Deer Creek Road	8.8	14.2	SR 157 in Mount Charleston	SR 156 near Lee Canyon	1998	Follows SR 158 as it traverses through the Spring Mountains between Kyle Canyon and Lee Canyon in Clark County.
Gerlach Road	4.5	7.2	Marble Dam Road	North of Nixon	1996	Follows SR 477 in Washoe County near Nixon on the east side of Pyramid Lake within the Pyramid Lake Indian Reservation.
Kyle Canyon Road	13.0	20.9	Mount Charleston	Northwest of Las Vegas	1998	Follows SR 157 in Clark County northwest of Las Vegas through Kyle Canyon in the Spring Mountains towards Mount Charleston.
Lamoille Canyon Road	12.5	20.1	Ruby Mountains	SR 227 near Lamoille	?	Follows National Forest Road 660 in Elko County, through Lamoille Canyon in the Ruby Mountains.
Lehman Caves Road	5.4	8.7	Great Basin National Park	SR 487 in Baker	2000	Follows SR 488 in White Pine County from Baker to the main gate of Great Basin National Park.
Mt. Charleston/Lee Canyon Road	17.5	28.2	Lee Canyon in Mount Charleston	US 95 northwest of Las Vegas	1998	Follows SR 156 as it traverses through the Spring Mountains towards Lee Canyon in Clark County.
Mt. Rose Highway	22.2	35.7	SR 28 in Incline Village	southwest of Reno	1996	Follows SR 431 in Washoe County. Passes by the Mount Rose Wilderness via the highest year-round pass in the Sierra Nevada at 8,911 feet (2,716 m)
North Las Vegas Strip	2.9	4.7	Sahara Avenue (SR 589) in Las Vegas	Washington Avenue (SR 578) in Las Vegas	2001	Follows Las Vegas Boulevard through Downtown Las Vegas in Clark County.
North Shore Road	16.1	25.9	US 50 near Spooner Lake	Nevada–California state line at Crystal Bay	1994	Follows SR 28 in western Nevada along the northern and eastern shores of Lake Tahoe.
Pyramid Lake Road	12.5	20.1	Pyramid Lake Indian Reservation boundary south of Sutcliffe	Warrior Point	1996	Follows SR 445 in Washoe County along the western shore of Pyramid Lake within the Pyramid Lake Indian Reservation.
Red Rock Road	8.8	14.2	South boundary of Red Rock Canyon NCA near Blue Diamond	East boundary of Red Rock Canyon NCA in Las Vegas	1995	Follows SR 159 through the Red Rock Canyon National Conservation Area west of Las Vegas in Clark County.
South Las Vegas Strip	4.5	7.2	Russell Road (SR 594) in Paradise	Sahara Avenue (SR 589) in Las Vegas	1995	America's first nighttime scenic byway; Follows Las Vegas Boulevard along the Las Vegas Strip in Clark County.
Sutcliffe/Nixon Road	13.2	21.2	SR 445 southeast of Sutcliffe	SR 447 in Nixon	1996	Follows SR 446 in Washoe County along the southern shore of Pyramid Lake within the Pyramid Lake Indian Reservation.
US 6/US 50/US 93	63.0	101.4	south of Ely	Nevada–Utah state line	2000	Follows US 6/US 50/US 93 in White Pine County near the northern reaches of Great Basin National Park.
US 50	21.5	34.6	Nevada–California state line at Stateline	West of Carson City	1994	Follows US 50 in western Nevada along the eastern shores of Lake Tahoe and down through the Carson Range towards Carson City.
US 93 (Great Basin Highway)	148.8	239.5	SR 318 near Crystal Springs	US 6/US 50 at Majors Place	?	Nevada's first scenic byway; Follows US 93 in Lincoln and White Pine counties via Caliente and Pioche. Connects five state parks and Great Basin National Park.
Valley of Fire Road	10.5	16.9	West entrance to Valley of Fire State Park	East entrance to Valley of Fire State Park	1995	Follows Valley of Fire Road through Valley of Fire State Park in Clark County.
White Domes Road	6.9	11.1	Valley of Fire Road	End of pavement near White Domes	1995	Follows White Domes Road in Valley of Fire State Park, Clark County.

== Nationally designated scenic byways ==
The National Scenic Byways program has four listings in Nevada, including one All-American Road. Additionally, one byway is part of the National Forest Scenic Byway program. All national byway designations comprise one or more of the Nevada scenic byways above.

Nationally designated scenic byways
Type	Name	Length (mi)	Length (km)	Southern or western terminus	Northern or eastern terminus	Date	State scenic byways incorporated in designation	Ref(s).
National Scenic Byway	City of Las Vegas, Las Vegas Boulevard National Scenic Byway	3.4	5.5	Sahara Avenue in Las Vegas	Washington Avenue in Las Vegas	2009	North Las Vegas Strip	
National Scenic Byway	Lake Tahoe - Eastshore Drive	28.0	45.1	Stateline	Incline Village	?	Part of US 50; North Shore Road	
National Forest Scenic Byway	Lamoille Canyon Scenic Byway	12.5	20.1	Ruby Mountains	SR 227 near Lamoille	?	Lamoille Canyon Road	
All-American Road	Las Vegas Strip	4.5	7.2	Welcome to Fabulous Las Vegas sign	Sahara Avenue in Las Vegas	2000	South Las Vegas Strip	
National Scenic Byway	Pyramid Lake Scenic Byway	30.2	48.6	Multiple termini near Pyramid Lake		1996	Gerlach Road, Pyramid Lake Road and Sutcliffe/Nixon Road	

== Gallery ==
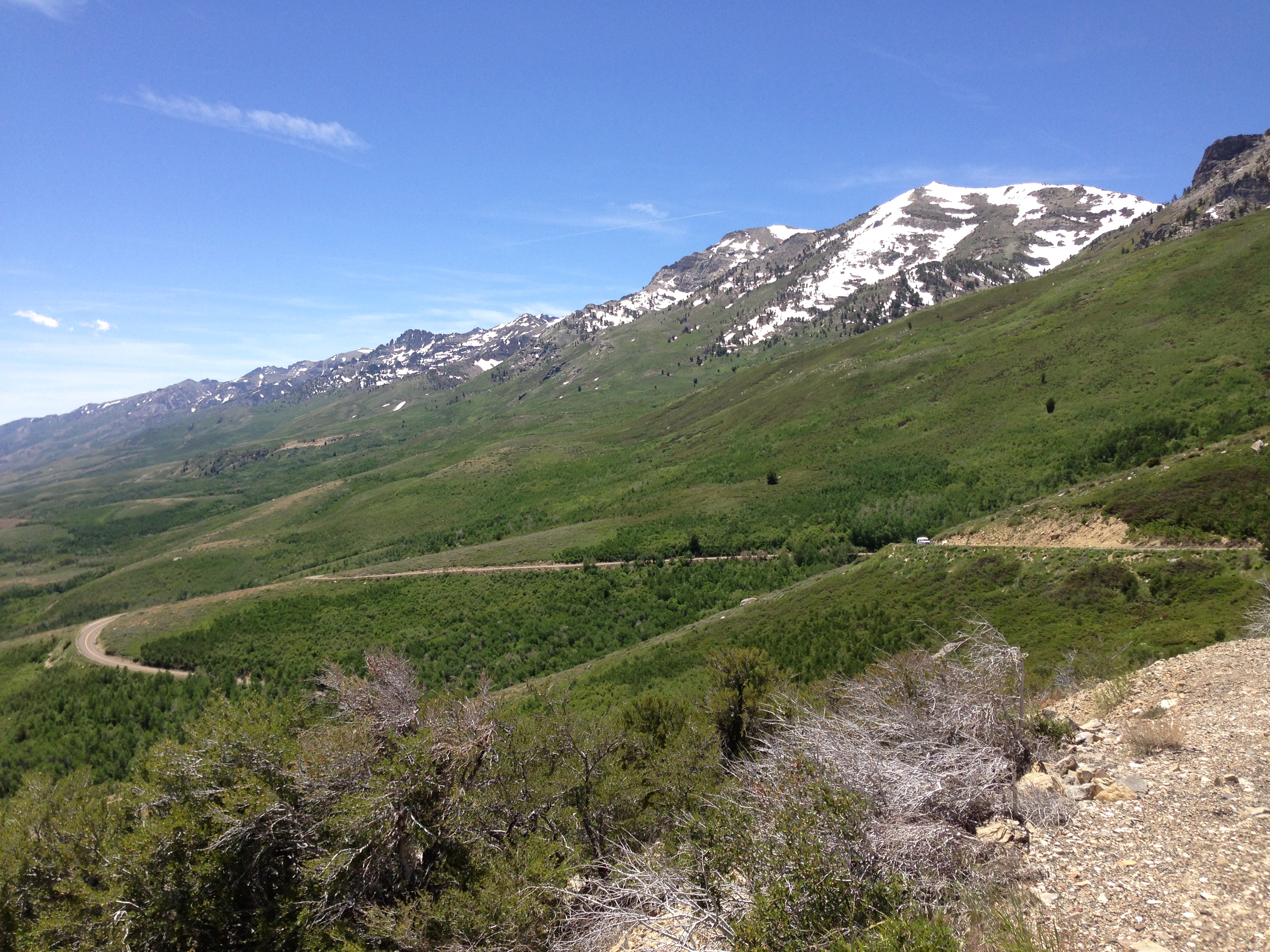
Angel Lake Road near Angel Lake

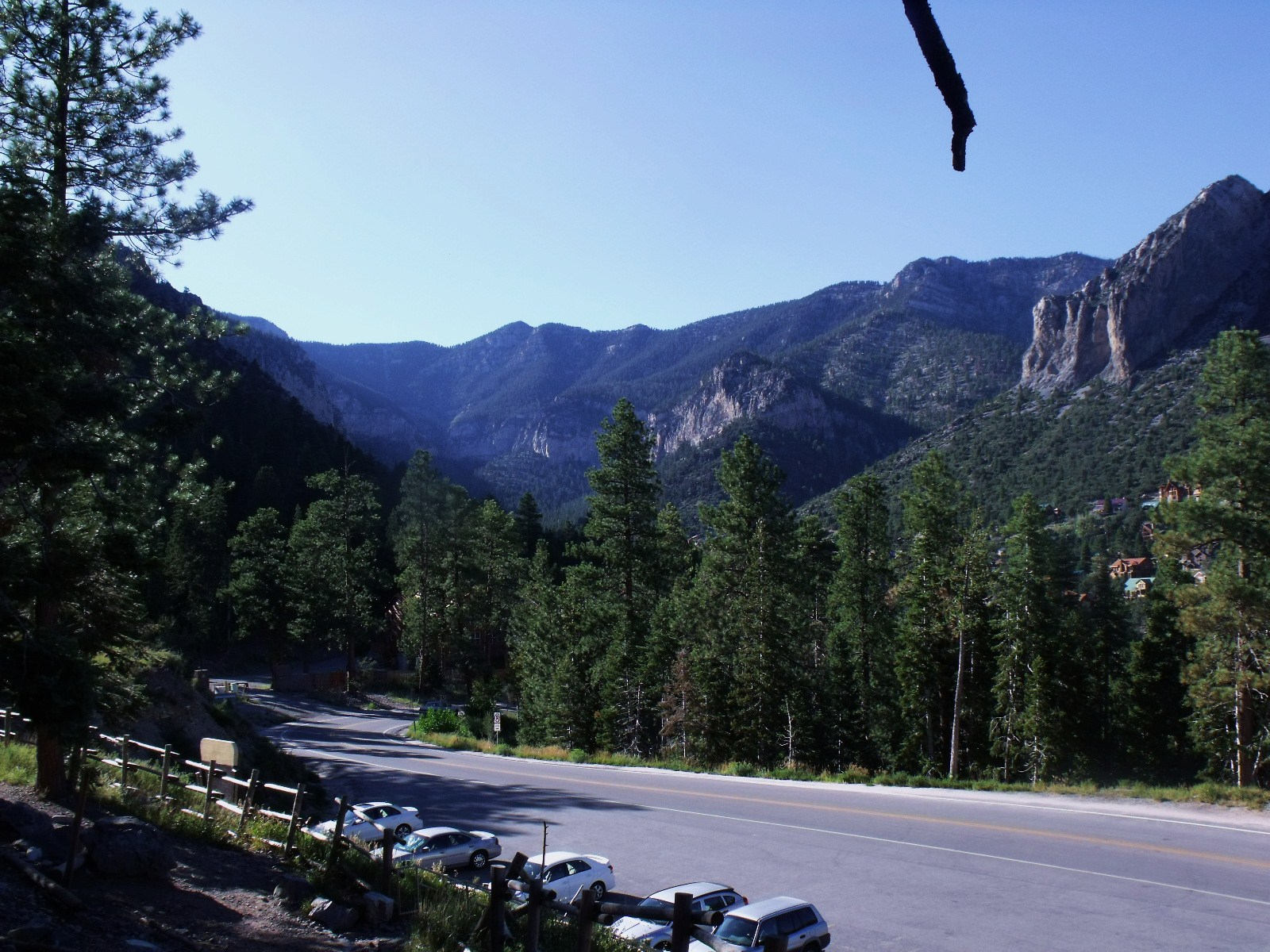
Kyle Canyon seen from Kyle Canyon Road

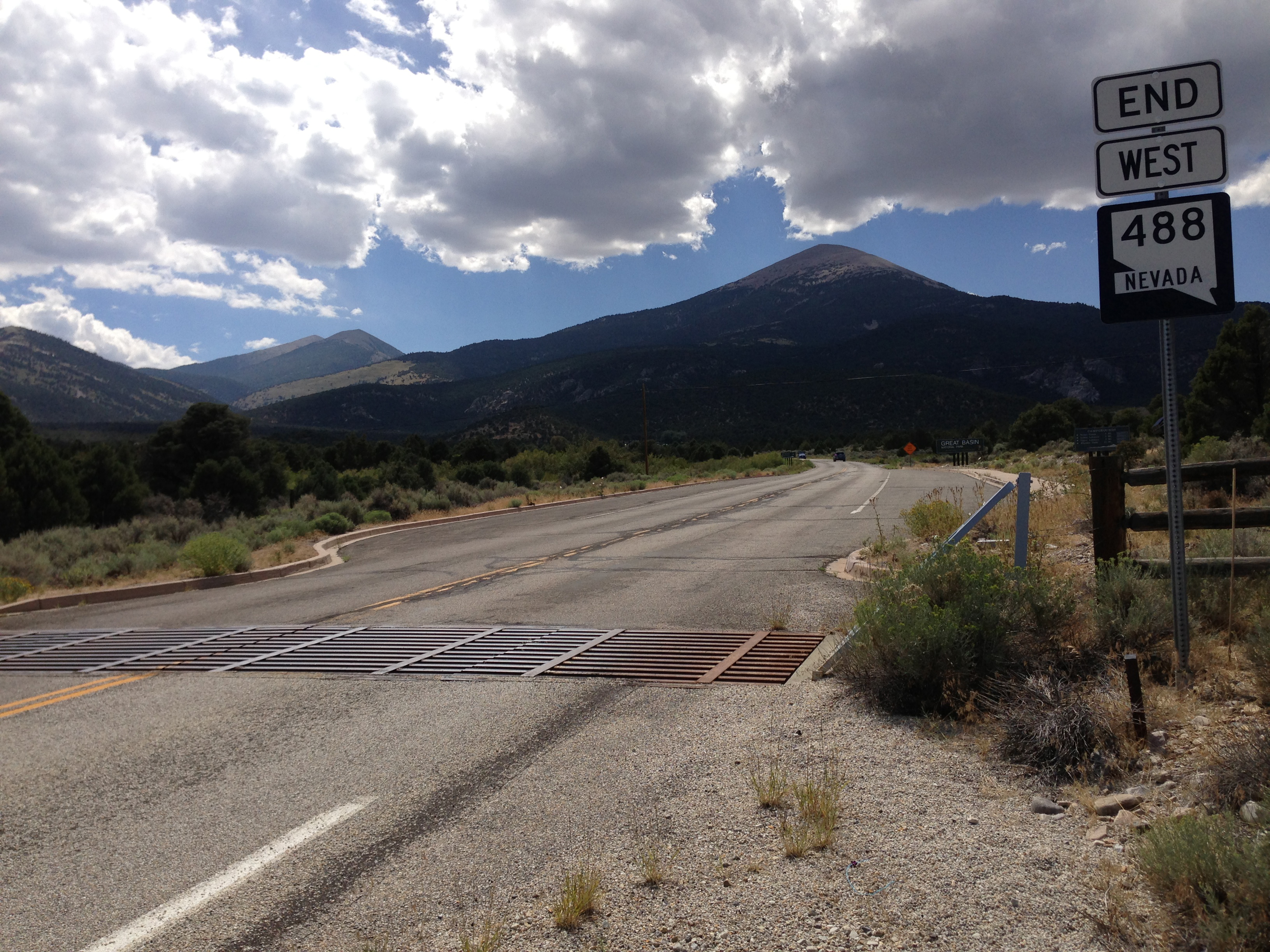
Lehman Caves Road entering Great Basin National Park

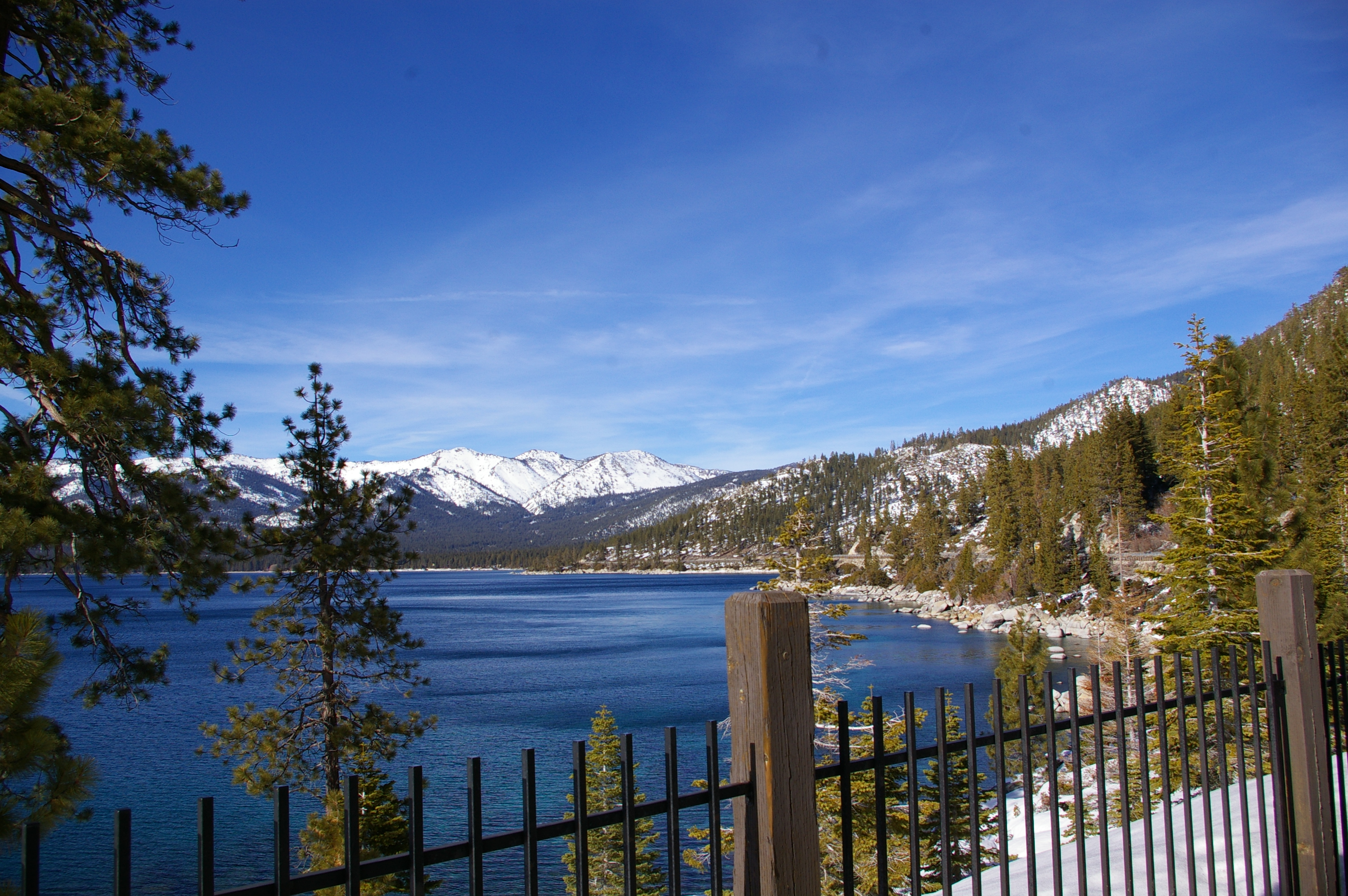
View of Lake Tahoe from North Shore Road

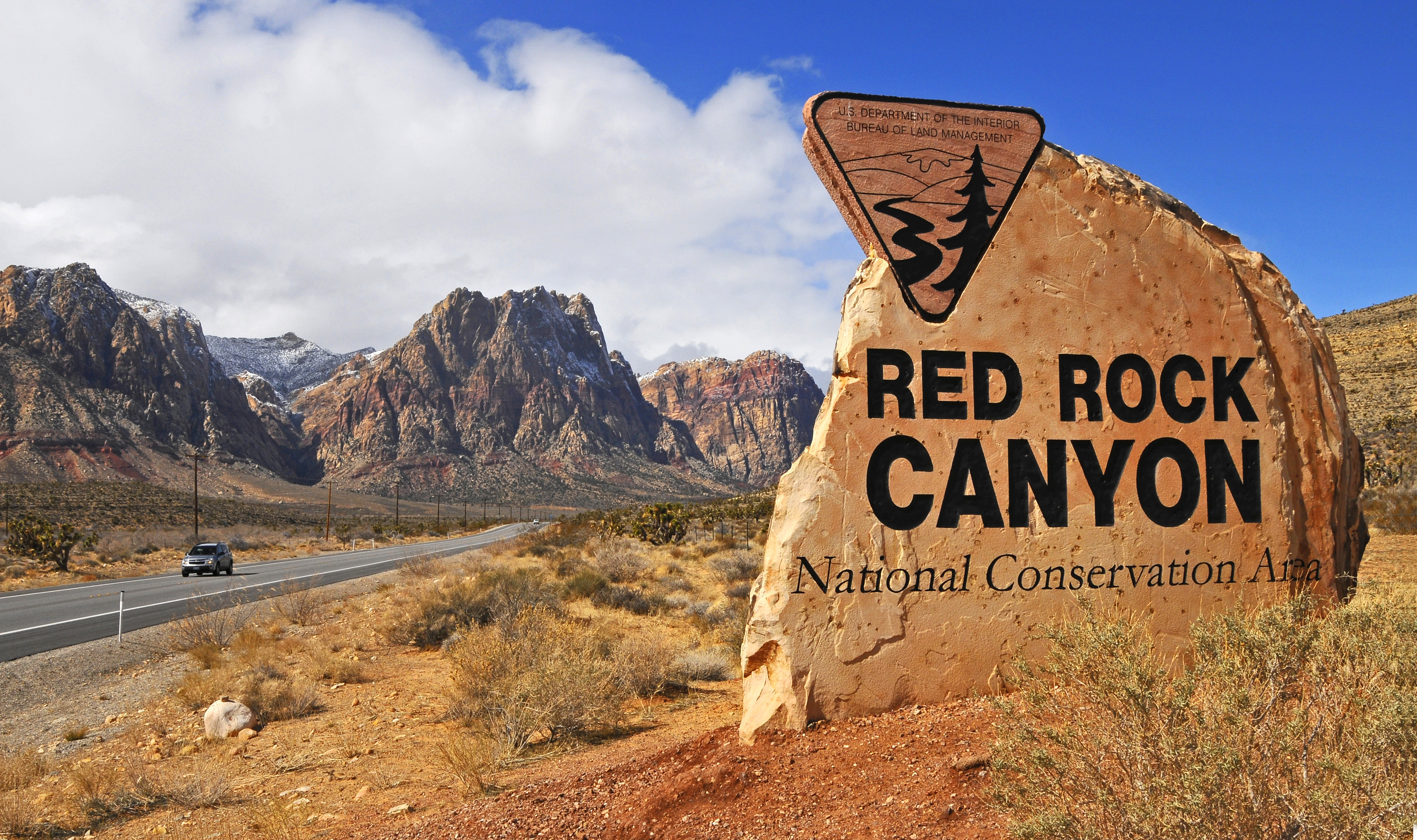
Red Rock Road entering Red Rock Canyon

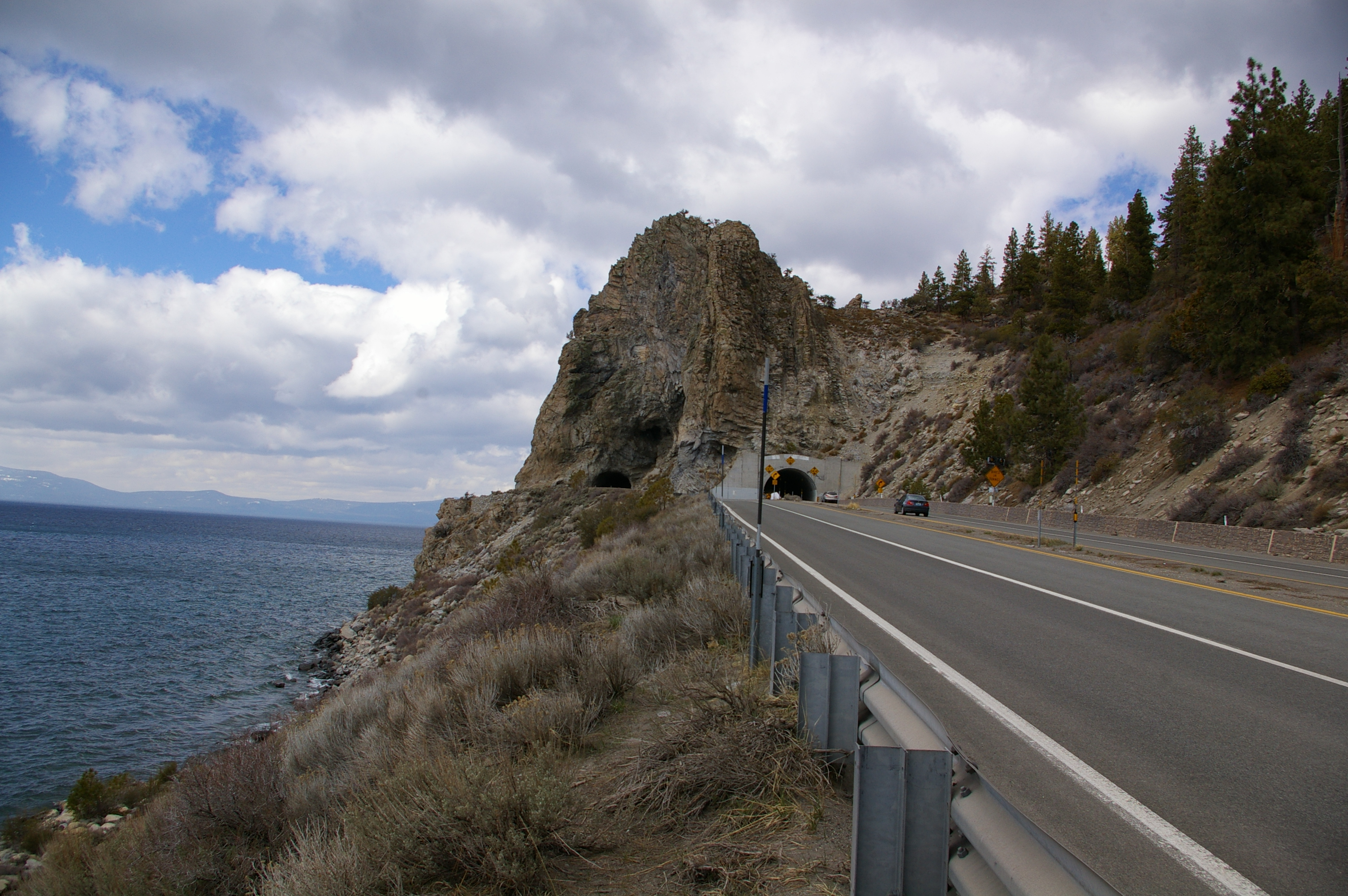
Cave Rock Tunnels on US 50 near Lake Tahoe

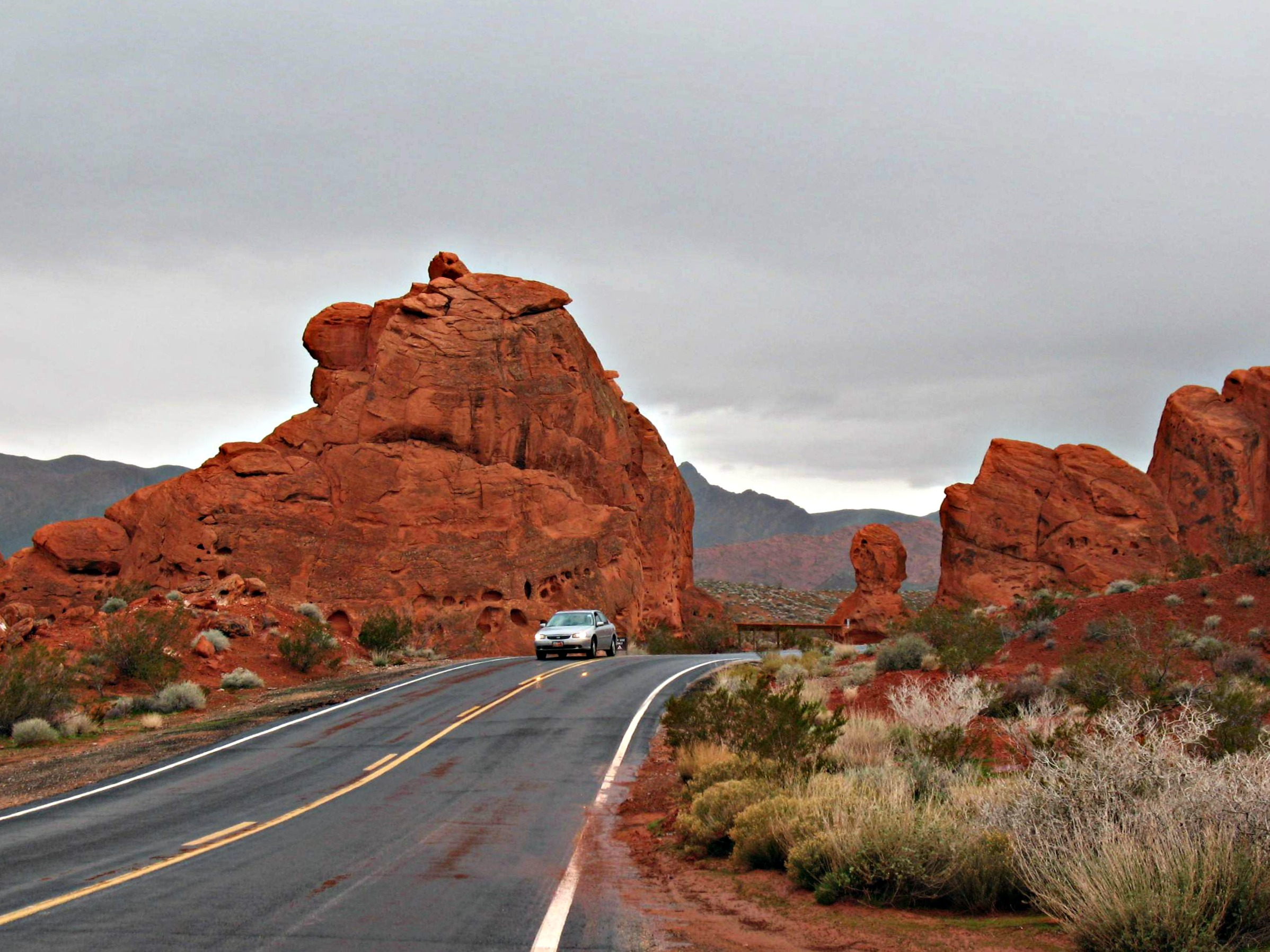
Valley of Fire Road

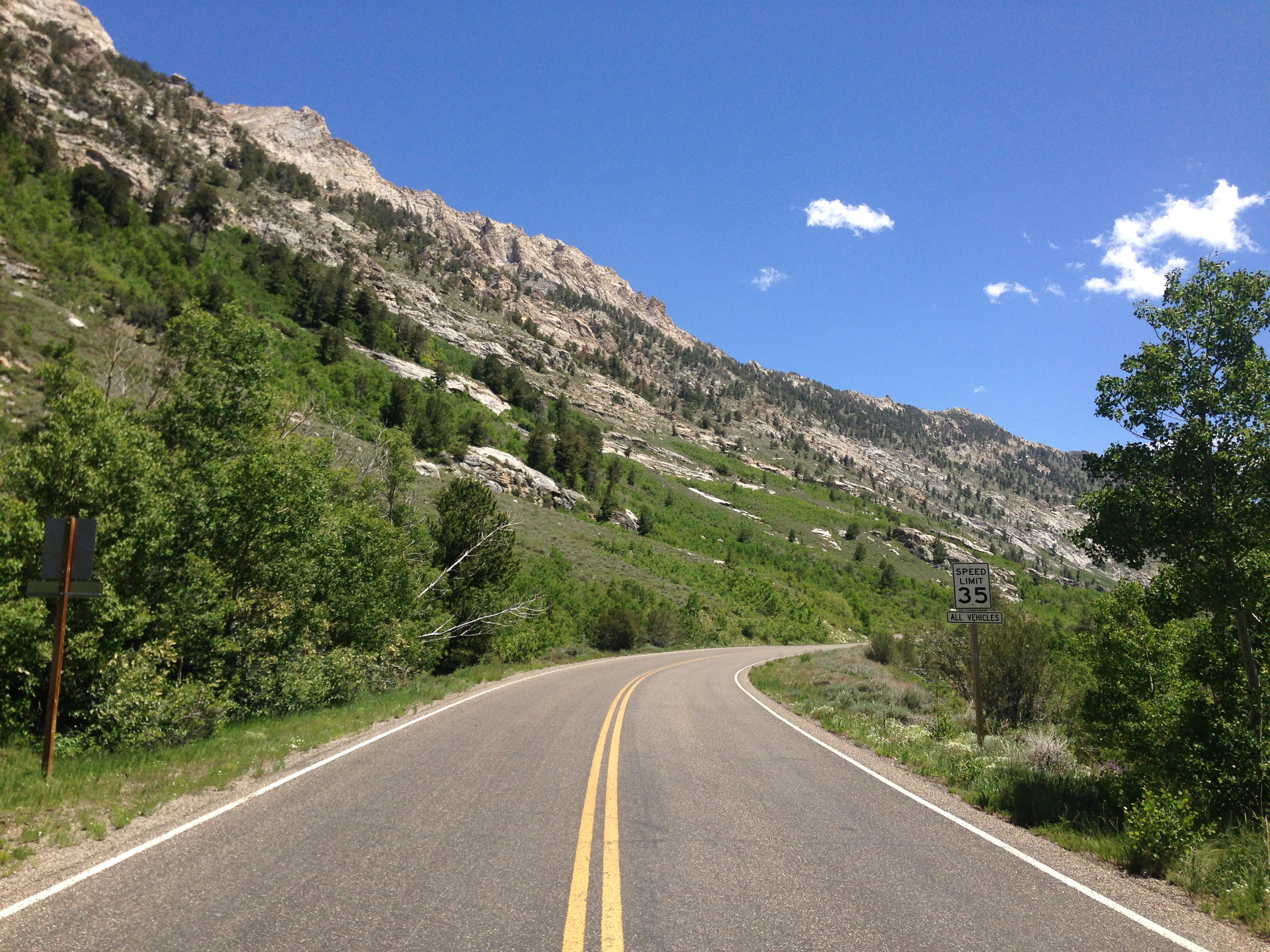
Lamoille Canyon Road

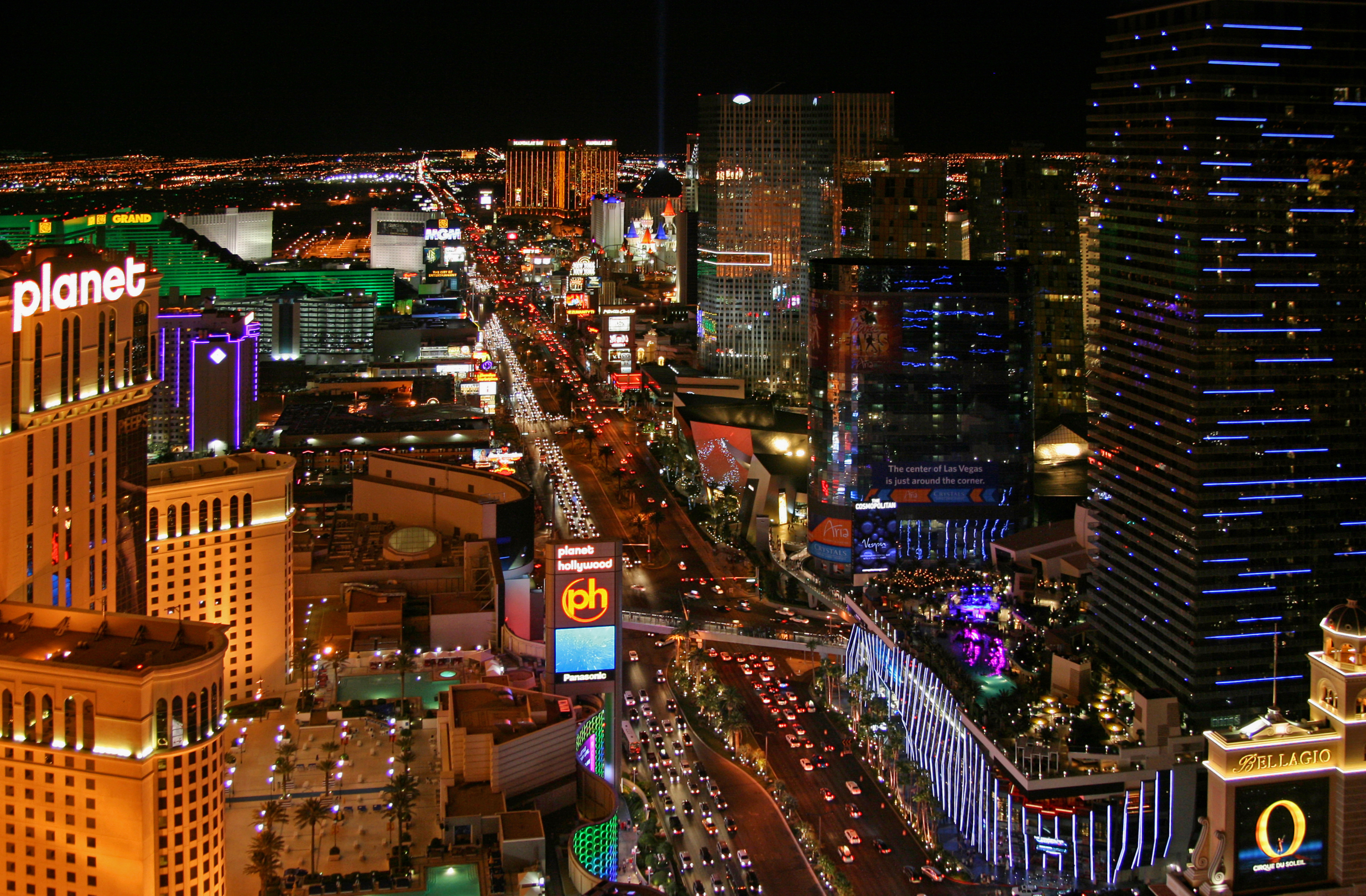
The Las Vegas Strip, an "All-American Road"
