= Nevada State Route 447 =

Highway in Nevada

County and State Route 447

- Major roads in northern Nevada with SR 447 in red

Route information
- Maintained by NDOT and Washoe County
- Length: 129.5 mi (208.4 km)
- Existed: July 1, 1976–present
- Tourist routes: Pyramid Lake Scenic Byway

Major junctions
- South end: SR 427 / I-80 BL in Wadsworth
- SR 446 in Nixon
- North end: Surprise Valley Road at the California state line near Cedarville

Location
- Country: United States
- State: Nevada
- Counties: Washoe, Pershing

Highway system
- Nevada State Highway System; Interstate; US; State; Pre‑1976; Scenic
← SR 446	→ SR 487

Route 447, consisting of County Route 447 (CR 447) and State Route 447 (SR 447) is a highway in the U.S. state of Nevada. The highway is almost entirely within Washoe County but does for a brief time enter Pershing County. The highway connects the town of Gerlach to the remainder of the state via Wadsworth. Though passing through extremely remote and desolate areas of Nevada, the highway has recently gained fame as the primary route to access the Black Rock Desert, the site of the annual Burning Man festival.

A 4.5-mile (7.2 km) portion of this highway, along with portions of SR 445 and SR 446, has been designated the Pyramid Lake Scenic Byway.

== Route description ==
=== State Route 447 ===
The route begins at a junction with SR 427 in Wadsworth. The highway proceeds north following the path of the Truckee River, and passes along the east side of the river's terminus at Pyramid Lake near Nixon. The section of highway from Wadsworth to Nixon is named the Arthur S. Jackson Memorial Highway, Jackson was a Paiute who was a heavily decorated soldier in World War II. The highway continues north following the western edge of Winnemucca Lake, a dry lake that once also was the terminus of the Truckee river. During this portion the highway straddles the Washoe/Pershing County line.

The highway enters the Black Rock Desert just before arriving at Empire, a city founded on processing gypsum extracted from the desert. The highway ends 0.375 miles (0.60 km) north of crossing the Union Pacific Railroad's Feather River Route in Gerlach.

Just past where the official designation ends is the turn off for former SR 34, which is used to access the large playa of the Black Rock Desert and the site of the annual Burning Man Festival.

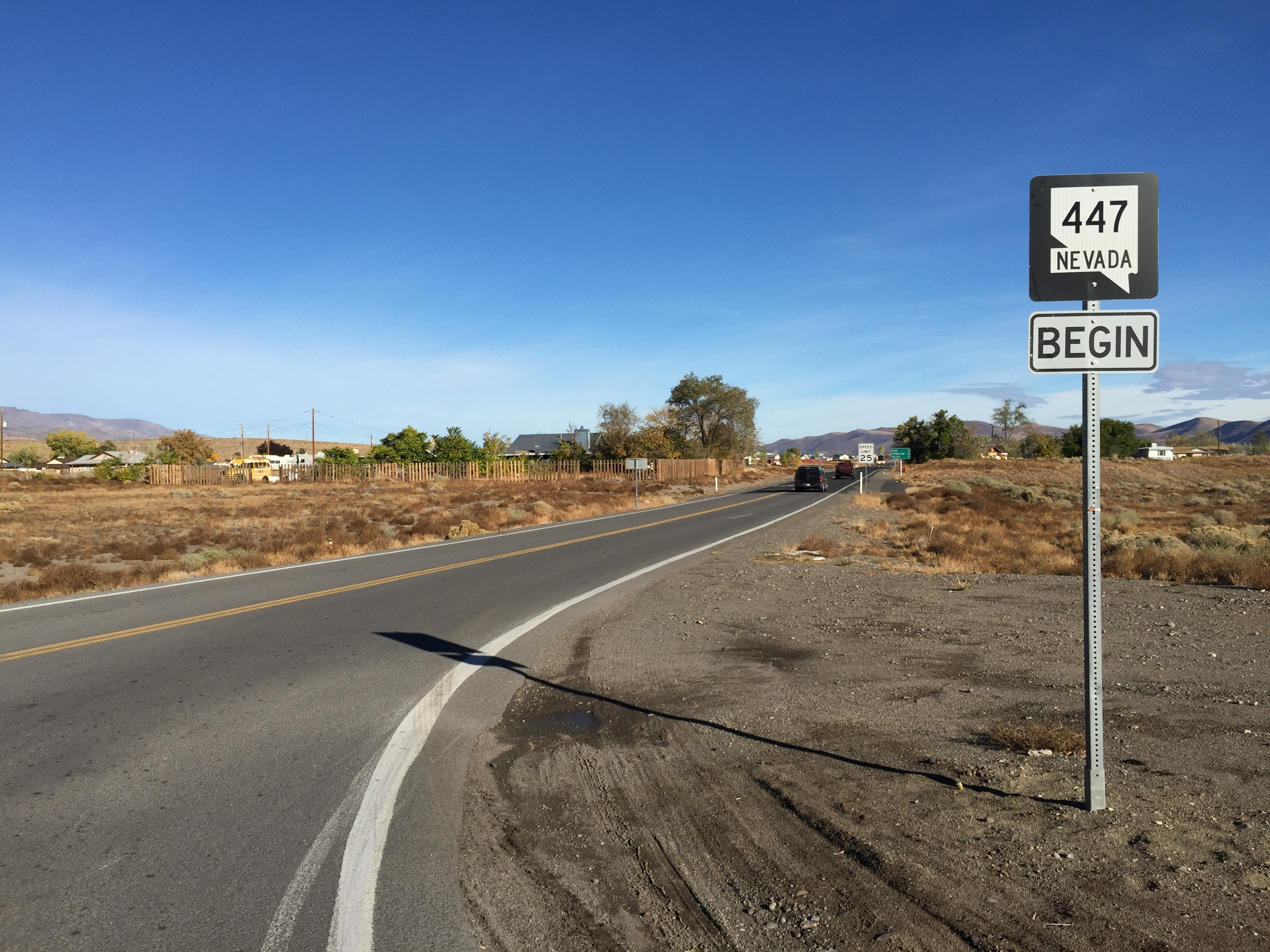
View north from the south end of SR 447 as seen in 2015

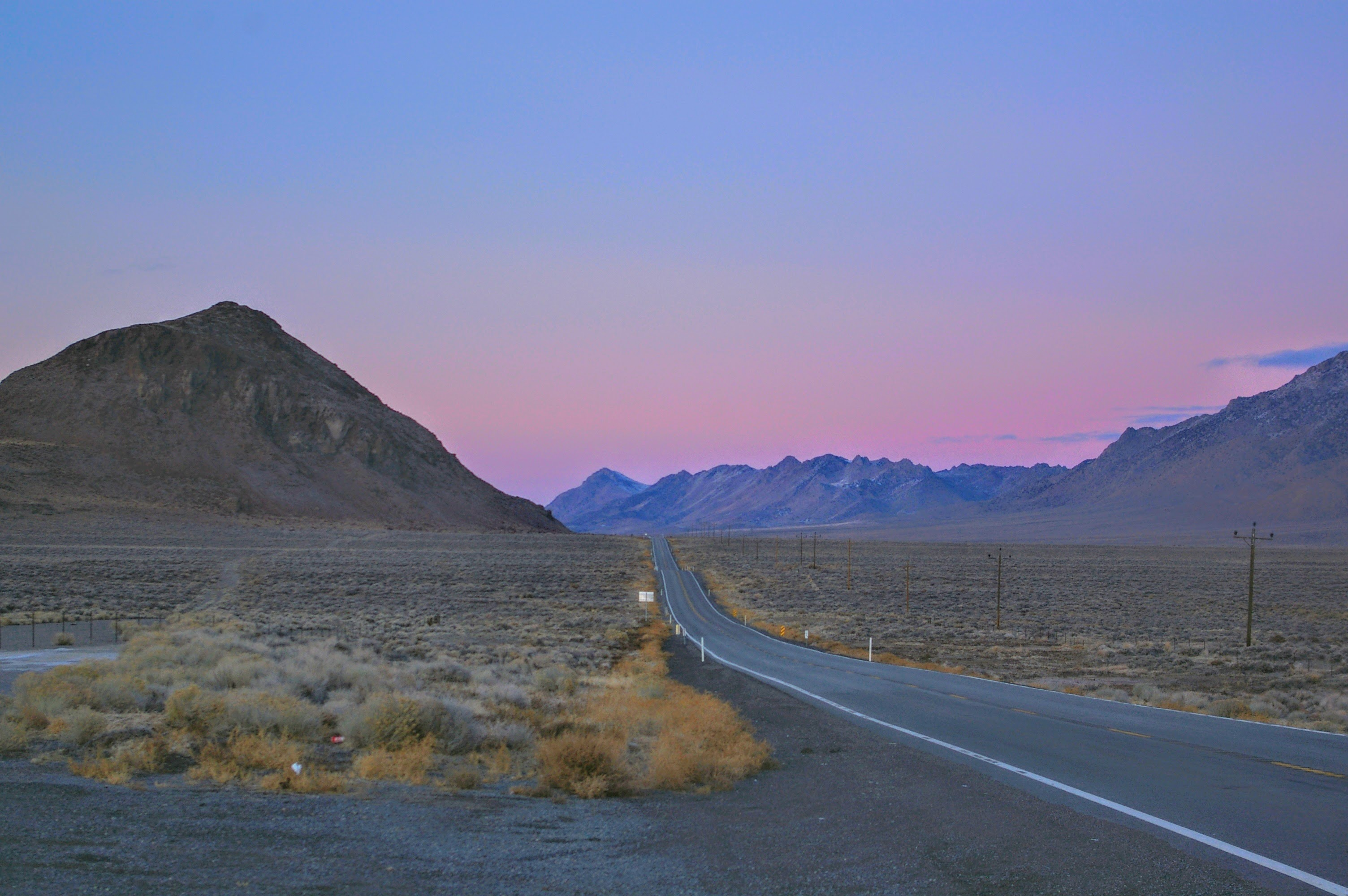
SR 447 leaving Winnemucca Lake northbound toward Empire as seen in 2009

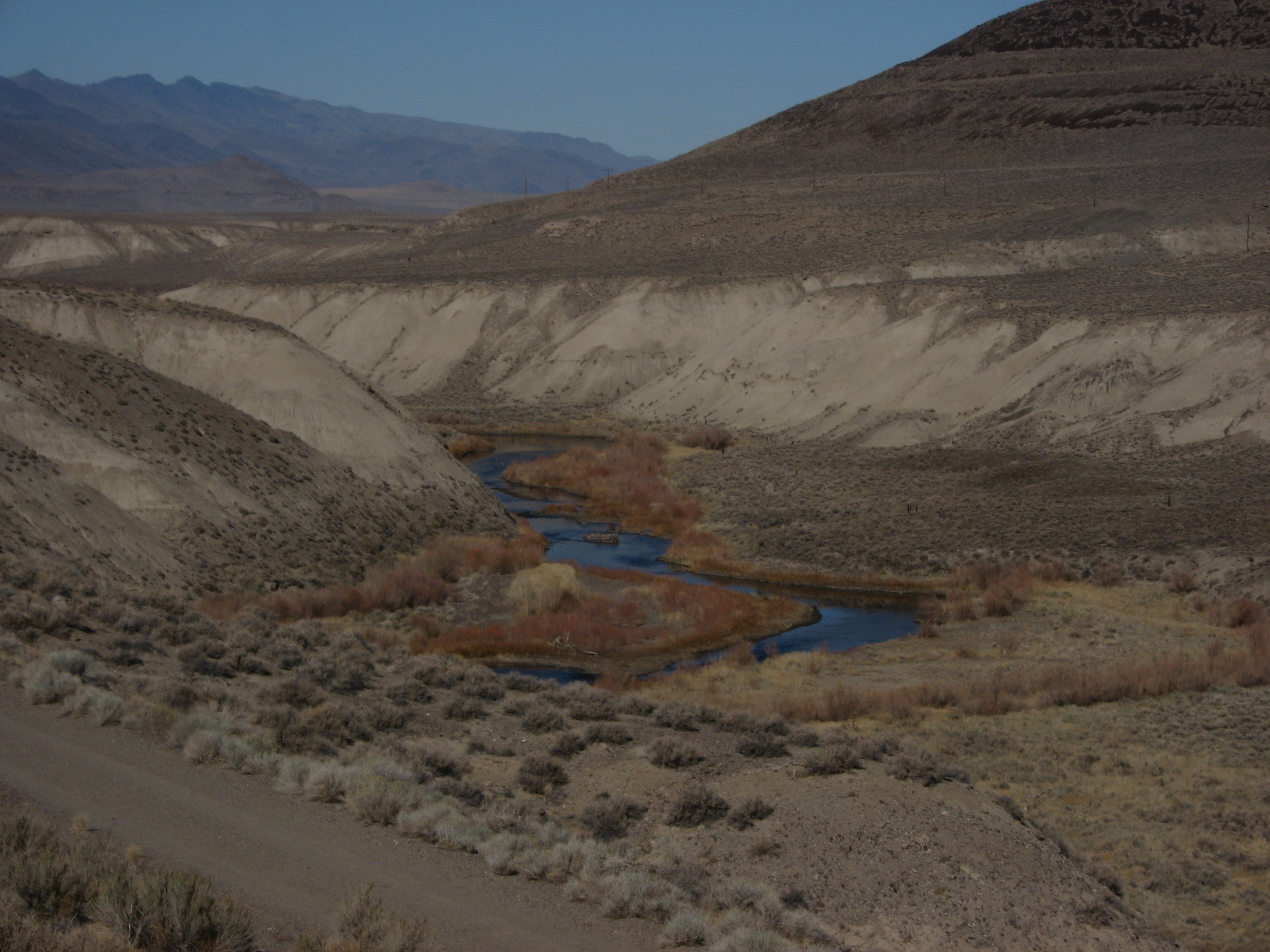
SR 447 between Wadsworth and Pyramid Lake as seen in 2009

=== County Route 447 ===
The State highway officially ends here, becoming CR 447 where the roadbed continues as a Washoe county road to the California State Line near the Lassen/Modoc county line. This road is frequently called the Gerlach-Cedarville Road. Some maps erroneously list this road as part of State Route 447.

== History ==
Before 1978, the present-day highway was part of SR 34 from Gerlach to Wadsworth, and former SR 81 from Gerlach to the California state line (now CR 447).

Ten solar energy arrays, totaling 451 kilowatts, have been installed along Nevada 447 with the help of Burning Man-related not-for-profit Black Rock Solar and Nevada's "Solar Generations" rebate program. Nevada Governor Jim Gibbons issued an August 18, 2010 proclamation declaring the road "to be America's Solar Highway".

== Major intersections ==
County	Location	mi	km	Destinations	Notes
Washoe	Wadsworth	0.000	0.000	SR 427 / I-80 BL (Main Street) to I-80 – Reno, Fernley	Southern terminus; former US 40
Washoe	Nixon	14.9	24.0	SR 446 west – Sutcliffe, Pyramid Lake State Park	Eastern terminus of SR 446
Pershing	No major junctions				
Washoe	Gerlach	74.645	120.129	Northern terminus of SR 447; Southern terminus of CR 447	
Washoe	Gerlach	75.5	121.5	CR 34 north – Vya	Former SR 34 north; access to Black Rock Desert
Washoe		129.5	208.4	Surprise Valley Road – Eagleville, Cedarville	Continuation into California
1.000 mi = 1.609 km; 1.000 km = 0.621 mi: Route transition
