= Anaho Island =

Lake island in Nevada, United States

Coordinates: 39°57′05″N 119°30′50″W

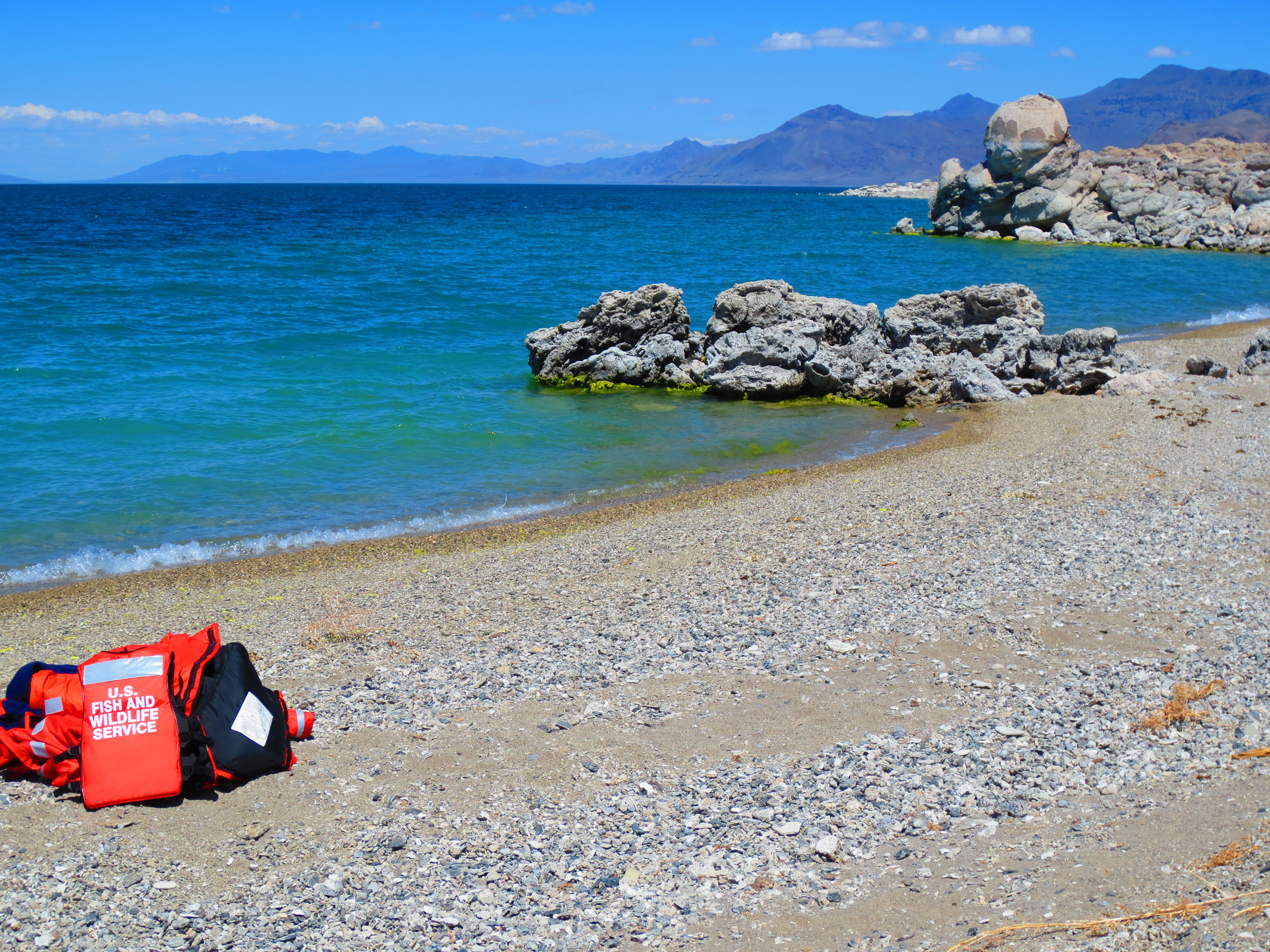
West shore of Anaho Island

Anaho Island is a rocky island in Pyramid Lake, and located on the Pyramid Lake Indian Reservation, Washoe County, in the U.S. state of Nevada.

== Geography ==
Anaho Island is a little more than 1 mile (1.6 km) long from north to south, and also from east to west at its widest point. It covers 634.43 acres (2.567 km^{2}).

The island is located in the southeastern section of the lake, approximately 4 miles (6.4 km) east of the community of Sutcliffe.

=== Anaho Island National Wildlife Refuge ===
The entire island is protected by the Anaho Island National Wildlife Refuge. The island is uninhabited by humans. Access to the island is highly restricted—no boats are allowed within 1,000 feet (300 m) of the shores.

The nature reserve protects a colony of American white pelicans, one of the two largest pelican colonies in the western United States.

The rocky island also has breeding colonies of California gulls, Caspian terns, double-crested cormorants, great blue herons, black-crowned night herons, and snowy egrets.
