= Nevada State Route 445 =

Highway in Nevada

State Route 445
- Pyramid Way; Pyramid Highway; Pyramid Lake Road
- SR 445 highlighted in red

Route information
- Maintained by NDOT
- Length: 41.890 mi (67.415 km)
- Existed: July 1, 1976–present
- Tourist routes: Pyramid Lake Scenic Byway

Major junctions
- South end: Nugget Avenue in Sparks
- I-80 in Sparks; SR 446 near Sutcliffe
- North end: Surprise Valley Road / Warrior Point Park Road north of Sutcliffe

Location
- Country: United States
- State: Nevada
- County: Washoe

Highway system
- Nevada State Highway System; Interstate; US; State; Pre‑1976; Scenic
← SR 443	→ SR 446

State Route 445 (SR 445) is a 41.890-mile-long (67.415 km) state highway in Washoe County, Nevada. The route follows Pyramid Way, a major thoroughfare in the city of Sparks and connects the Reno metropolitan area to Pyramid Lake. The route is designated a Nevada Scenic Byway.

== Route description ==
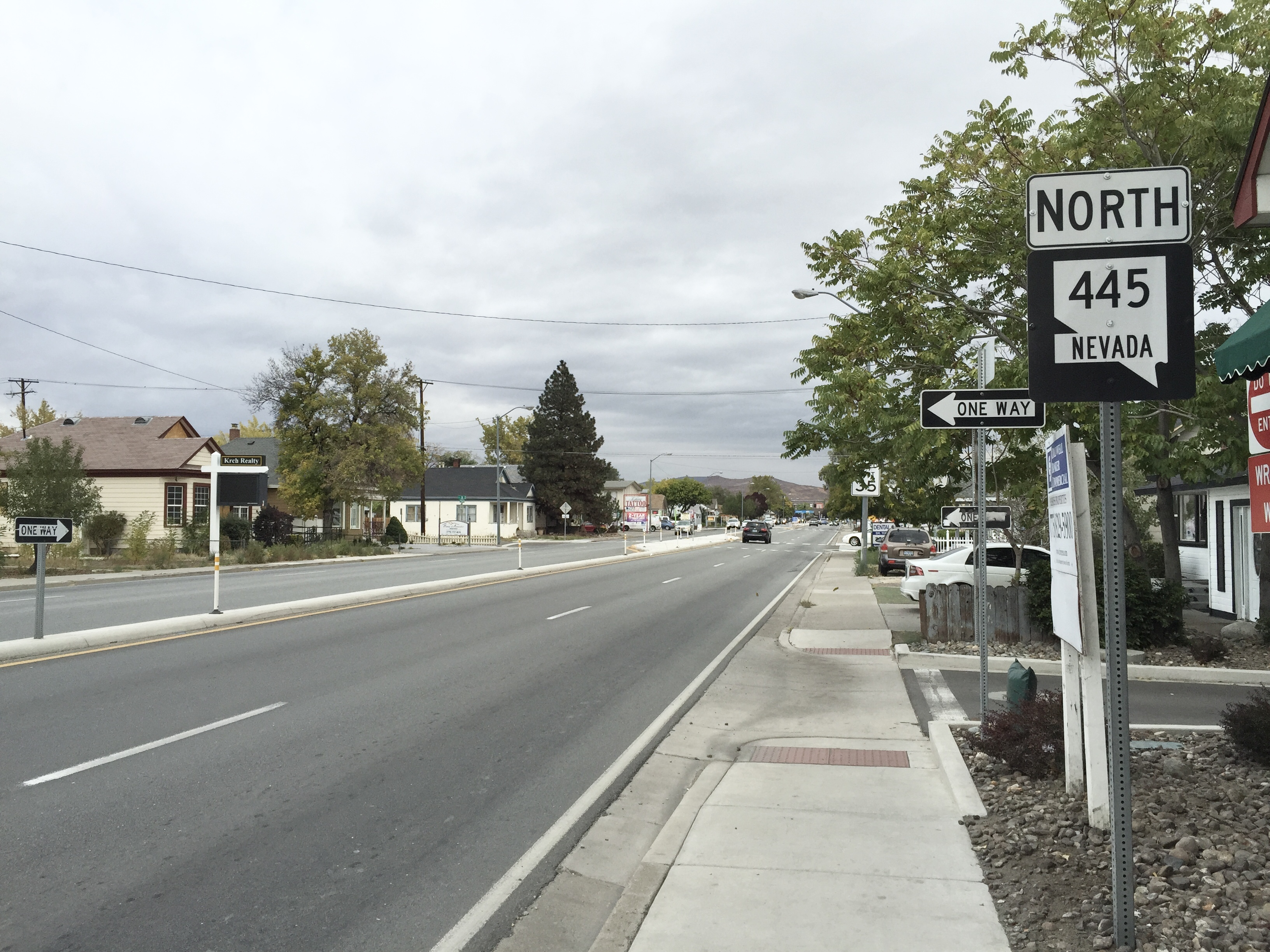
View near the south end of SR 445 in Sparks looking northbound as seen in 2015

SR 445 begins at the intersection of Nugget Avenue and Pyramid Way in Sparks. From there, it passes under Interstate 80 directly to the north and skirts the eastern edge of Victorian Square in downtown Sparks as it continues heading almost due north. After about 2 miles (3.2 km), the road curves slightly to the northeast to serve as the primary link to the rapidly expanding northern valleys of Sparks, including Spanish Springs.

Once outside of urban Sparks, SR 445 transitions to Pyramid Lake Road, more commonly referred to as Pyramid Highway. The rural highway is four lanes for a seven–mile stretch passing through Spanish Springs. The road narrows to two lanes entering the more sparsely populated Palamino Valley north to Pyramid Lake. As the road turns more sharply northeast, it enters the Pyramid Lake Indian Reservation. Shortly thereafter, the road curves northwest as it intersects State Route 446, following the western shore of Pyramid Lake. The highway passes through Sutcliffe and then comes to an end at Warrior Point Park Road, north of the town.

== History ==
The first two miles (3 km) of State Route 445 in Sparks was originally designated State Route 32, with the remainder of the route comprising most of former State Route 33. SR 445 was crafted from these routes in the Nevada highway renumbering that took place in the late 1970s.

12.5 miles (20.1 km) of the route (the entirety of the route within the Pyramid Lake Indian Reservation) became a Nevada Scenic Byway on June 27, 1996. The same stretch was designated a National Scenic Byway on July 15 of that same year.

== Future ==
The Pyramid Highway/U.S. 395 Connector (also known as the Northeast Connector) is a project taken by NDOT and RTC Washoe to improve mobility throughout the northern communities. The projects focuses on rerouting Pyramid Highway as a four to six–lane limited arterial roadway and freeway connecting U.S. 395 with an indirect connection to Sun Valley Boulevard, traveling along the mountainous region dividing Sun Valley with Sparks before merging with the original route. There is no set completion date as it has not entered final design.

== Major intersections ==
The entire route is in Washoe County.

Location	mi	km	Destinations	Notes
Sparks	0.000	0.000	Nugget Avenue	Southern terminus
Sparks			I-80 – Elko, Sacramento	
Sparks			I-80 BL (Victorian Avenue)	Former US 40
Sparks			I Street / Oddie Boulevard	Oddie Boulevard was formerly part of SR 663 west
Sparks	3.89	6.26	N. McCarran Boulevard (SR 659)	Former SR 650
Sparks			Farr Lane (SR 880 west)	
Sutcliffe			SR 446 east (Sutcliffe Highway) – Nixon	Western terminus of SR 446
	41.890	67.415	Warrior Point Park Road	Northern terminus
	41.890	67.415	Surprise Valley Road	Continuation beyond northern terminus
1.000 mi = 1.609 km; 1.000 km = 0.621 mi
