= PLHS =

PLHS may refer to the following schools in the United States:

- Papillion-La Vista Senior High School, Papillion, Nebraska
- Pequot Lakes High School, Pequot Lakes, Minnesota
- Point Loma High School, San Diego, California
- Pompton Lakes High School, Pompton Lakes, New Jersey
- Prior Lake High School, Savage, Minnesota
- Pyramid Lake High School, Nixon, Nevada
