= Anaho Island National Wildlife Refuge =

National Wildlife Refuge in Nevada

- IUCN category IV (habitat/species management area)
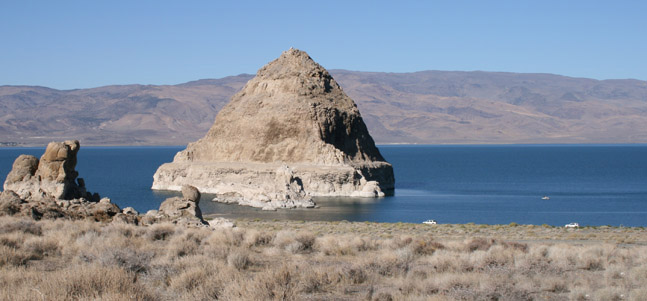

- Location within the United States
- Location: Washoe County, Nevada, United States
- Nearest city: Reno, Nevada
- Coordinates: 39°57′15″N 119°30′30″W
- Area: 247 acres (100 ha)
- Established: 1913
- Governing body: U.S. Fish and Wildlife Service
- Website: Anaho Island National Wildlife Refuge

The Anaho Island National Wildlife Refuge is a wildlife refuge on Anaho Island in Pyramid Lake, Nevada. The refuge was established by President Woodrow Wilson in 1913 as a sanctuary for colonial nesting birds. It is home to one of the two largest colonies of pelicans—American white pelicans—in the western U.S. Other birds found on the island include California gulls, Caspian terns, double-crested cormorants, great blue herons, black-crowned night herons, and snowy egrets.

No boats are allowed within 1000 feet of the refuge. Refuge staff and volunteers visit the island to keep track of birds and band juvenile pelicans. An estimated 8-10,000 pelicans used to return to Anaho Island each spring from their winter homes in Southern California and Baja California, Mexico. In 1967, cui-ui, a staple food of the pelican, was declared to be endangered after water diversions affected the fish runs. In 2005, it was reported that the number of pelican nests had dropped dramatically, due to drought.
