= Pyramid Lake Schools =

Native American school in Nixon, Nevada

Coordinates: 39.8241°N 119.3694°W

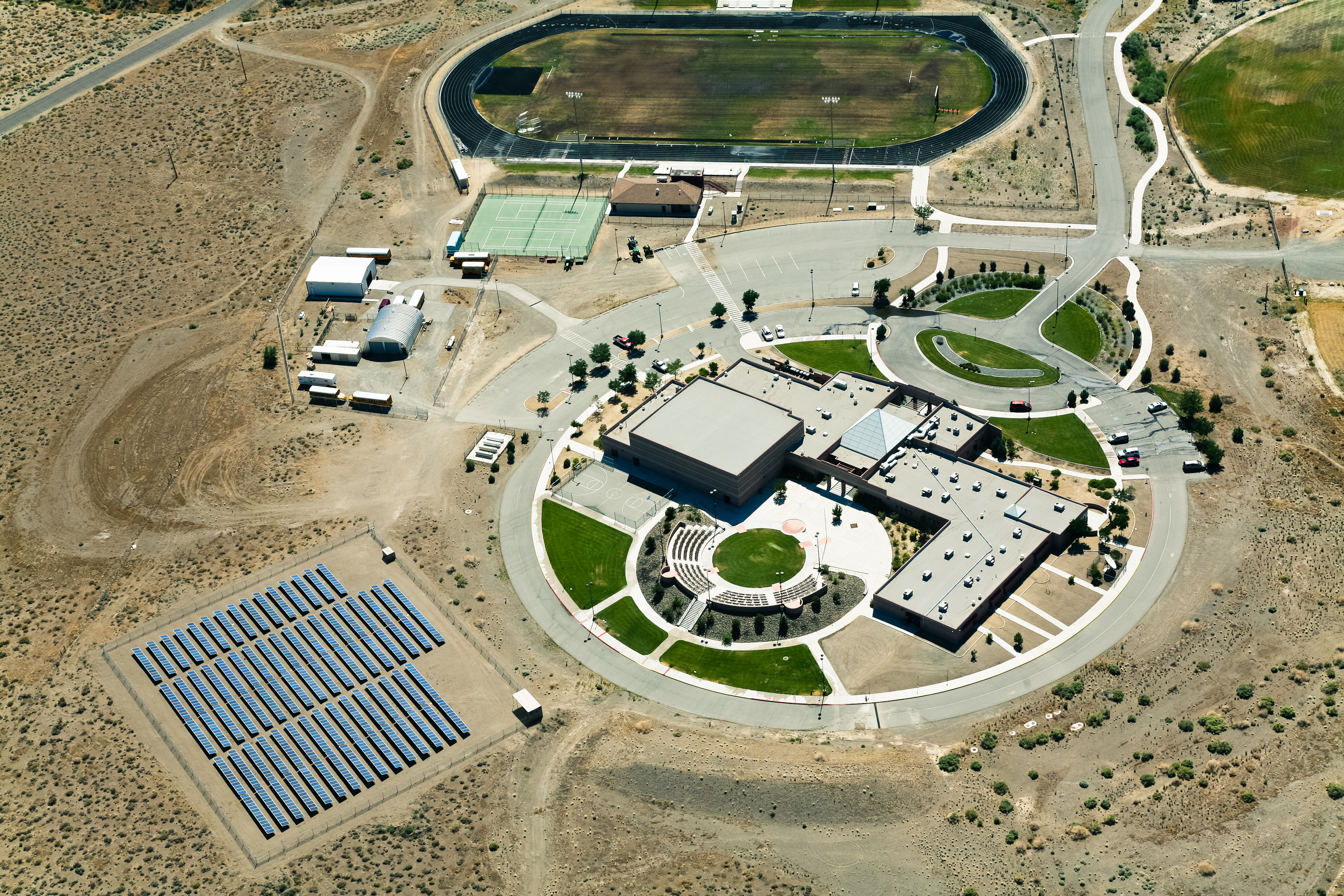
Pyramid Lake Schools by air

Pyramid Lake Schools or Pyramid Lake School, a.k.a. Pyramid Lake Jr. Sr. High School (PLJSHS), is a tribal secondary school in Nixon, Nevada, funded by the Bureau of Indian Affairs (BIE). It is within the Pyramid Lake Indian Reservation.

The NCES classifies it as a public school.

Its current building was scheduled to open in fall 2000. Prior to that time a tribally-owned building functioned as a gymnasium and classes were held in double-wide trailers; there were three total of the latter.

In 2014 Siobhan McAndrew of the Reno Gazette Journal wrote that Pyramid Lake high "has been viewed by some as a last resort for Native Americans who flunked out or were kicked out of schools in Washoe County and Fernley." However she stated that by 2014 there were improvements in test scores.

== Operations ==
In 2014 it had 12 employees. As of 2014 at least four employees annually change jobs, and according to McAndrew Pyramid Lake Schools had trouble with encouraging teachers to stay at the school.

== Academic performance ==
McAndrew stated in 2014 that previously the school had issues with academic performance but in 2014 all of the 11th grade students passed the Nevada state English examinations.

== Enrollment ==
Prior to fall 2000 the school had about 77 students. Prior to that time many students had dropped out of other schools before coming to Pyramid Lake. Circa 2000 an individual named Henson, quoted by O'Driscoll, stated "Now we have kids coming for the education." School officials projected that enrollment would increase to 250 with the opening of the current building. By 2005 enrollment was about 100.

== Athletics ==
By 2005 it was classified as 1A. McAndrew stated that athletic events were originally more sparsely attended but by 2014 became very popular.
