= Nevada State Route 446 =

Highway in Nevada

State Route 446
- Sutcliffe–Nixon Road
- SR 446 highlighted in red

Route information
- Maintained by NDOT
- Length: 13.156 mi (21.173 km)
- Existed: July 1, 1976–present
- Tourist routes: Pyramid Lake Scenic Byway

Major junctions
- West end: SR 445 near Sutcliffe
- East end: SR 447 in Nixon

Location
- Country: United States
- State: Nevada
- County: Washoe

Highway system
- Nevada State Highway System; Interstate; US; State; Pre‑1976; Scenic
← SR 445	→ SR 447

State Route 446 (SR 446) is a 13.156-mile-long (21.173 km) state highway serving Washoe County, Nevada. The route runs from SR 445 (Pyramid Lake Road) to SR 447 (Gerlach Road) at the town of Nixon.

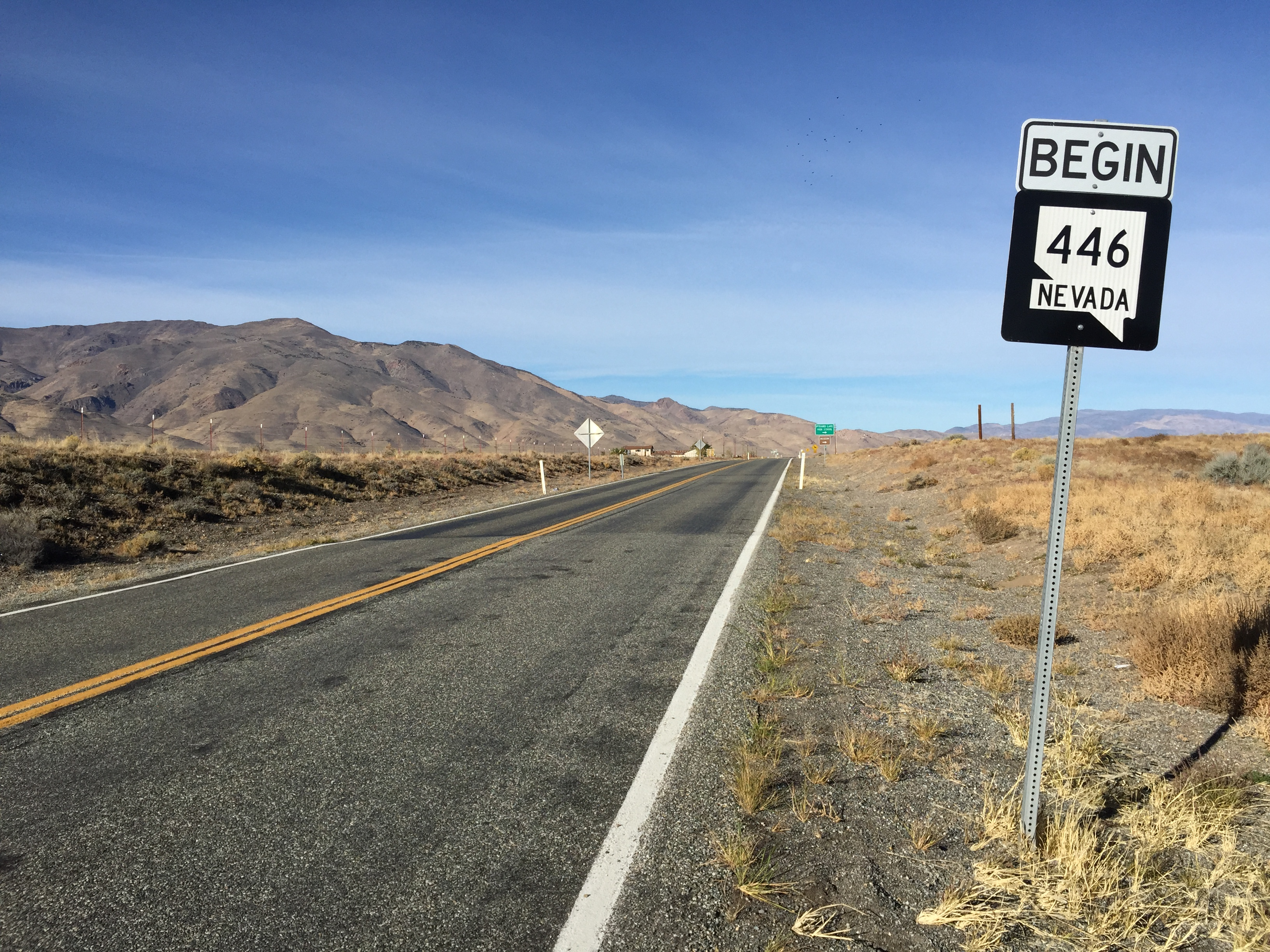
View at the east end of SR 446 looking westbound as seen in 2015

== History ==
SR 446 became a Nevada Scenic Byway on June 27, 1996 and was designated part of the Pyramid Lake National Scenic Byway on July 15 of that year.

== Major intersections ==
The entire route is in Washoe County.

Location	mi	km	Destinations	Notes
	0.000	0.000	SR 445 – Sparks, Sutcliffe	Western terminus
Nixon	13.156	21.173	SR 447 – Wadsworth, Gerlach	Eastern terminus
1.000 mi = 1.609 km; 1.000 km = 0.621 mi
