= Pyramid Lake (Nevada) =

Lake in Nevada, United States

- Kooyooe Panunadu (Northern Paiute); áʔwaku dáʔaw (Washo)
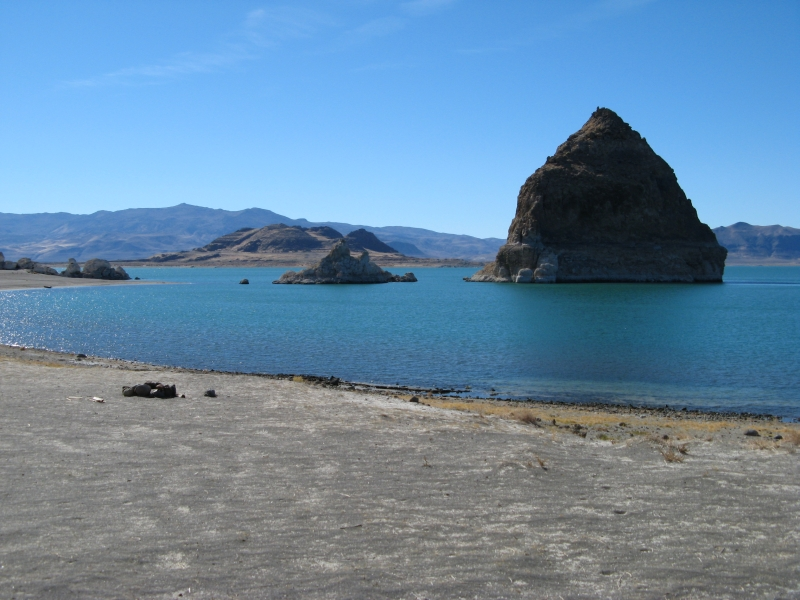
- The tufa formation that gives Pyramid Lake its name.

- Location in Nevada Pyramid Lake (the United States)
- Location: Washoe County, Nevada, United States
- Coordinates: 40°03′45″N 119°33′49″W
- Lake type: endorheic salt lake
- Etymology: pyramidal limestone columns
- Primary inflows: Truckee River
- Catchment area: 1,825.8 sq mi (4,729 km^{2})
- Max. length: 29.8 mi (48.0 km)
- Max. width: 8.7 mi (14.0 km)
- Surface area: 188 sq mi (490 km^{2})
- Max. depth: 356 ft (109 m)
- Water volume: 23,660,000 acre-feet (29.18 km^{3})
- Surface elevation: 3,796 ft (1,157 m) (1980 data)
- Islands: Anaho Island
- References: GNIS ID: 856349

Nevada Historical Marker
- Reference no.: 18

Pyramid Lake is a saltwater lake in the geographic sink of the basin of the Truckee River, 40 mi (64 km) northeast of Reno, Nevada.

Pyramid Lake is the biggest remnant of ancient Lake Lahontan, a large endorheic lake that once covered most of western Nevada. It is approximately 27 miles (43 km) long and 11 miles (18 km) wide, with a perimeter of 71 miles (114 km), covering 112,000 acres (45,000 ha) entirely enclosed within the Pyramid Lake Paiute Tribe Reservation.

Pyramid Lake is fed by the Truckee River, which is mostly the outflow from Lake Tahoe. The Truckee River enters Pyramid Lake at its southern end. Pyramid Lake is an endorheic lake, with water leaving only by evaporation or sub-surface seepage. The lake has about 10% of the area of the Great Salt Lake, but it has about 25% more volume. The salinity is approximately 1/6 that of sea water. Although clear Lake Tahoe forms the headwaters that drain to Pyramid Lake, the Truckee River delivers more turbid waters to Pyramid Lake after traversing the steep Sierra terrain and collecting moderately high silt-loaded surface runoff.

The north and east sides of the lake have been restricted to the public and non-Tribal members since April 2011 when the Tribal Nation made the decision to close these areas due to the desecration of sacred sites. When visiting, it is recommended to take note of the Tribal protocols and restricted areas.

== Name ==
In Northern Paiute language it is called Kooyooe (Cui-ui) Panunadu or Kooyooe Pa'a Panunadu after the cui-ui fish, which helped sustain the populations around the lake. In fact, a major band of Northern Paiute (endonym: Numu) people whose ancestors lived around the lake call themselves the Kooyooe Tukadu, "cui-ui eaters."

In Washo the name of the lake is áʔwaku dáʔaw, meaning "trout lake."

The English name of the lake, given to it by explorer John C. Frémont, comes from the impressive cone- or pyramid-shaped tufa formations found in the lake and along the shores.

== History ==
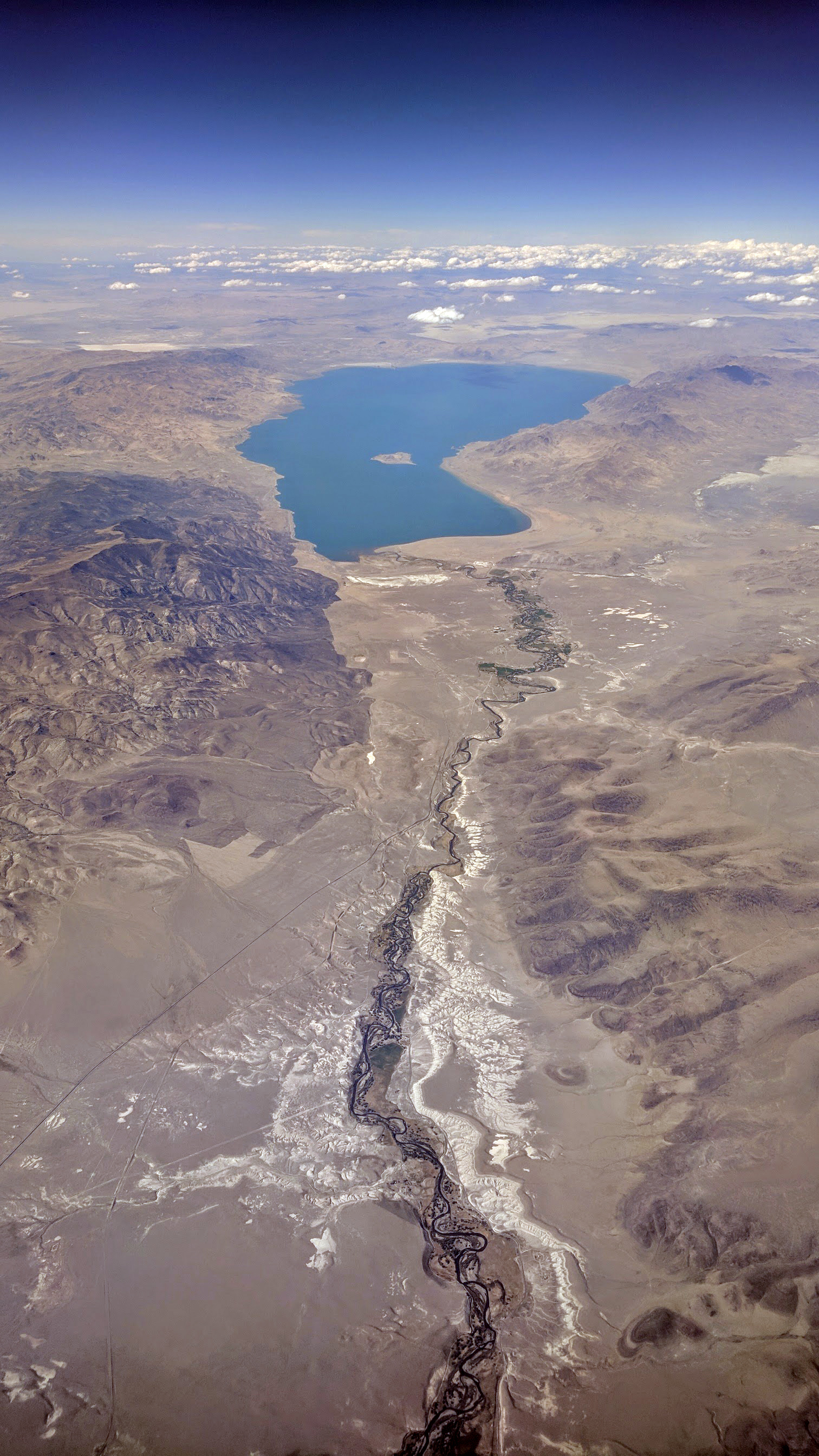
Aerial view from the south of the Truckee River where it drains to Pyramid Lake

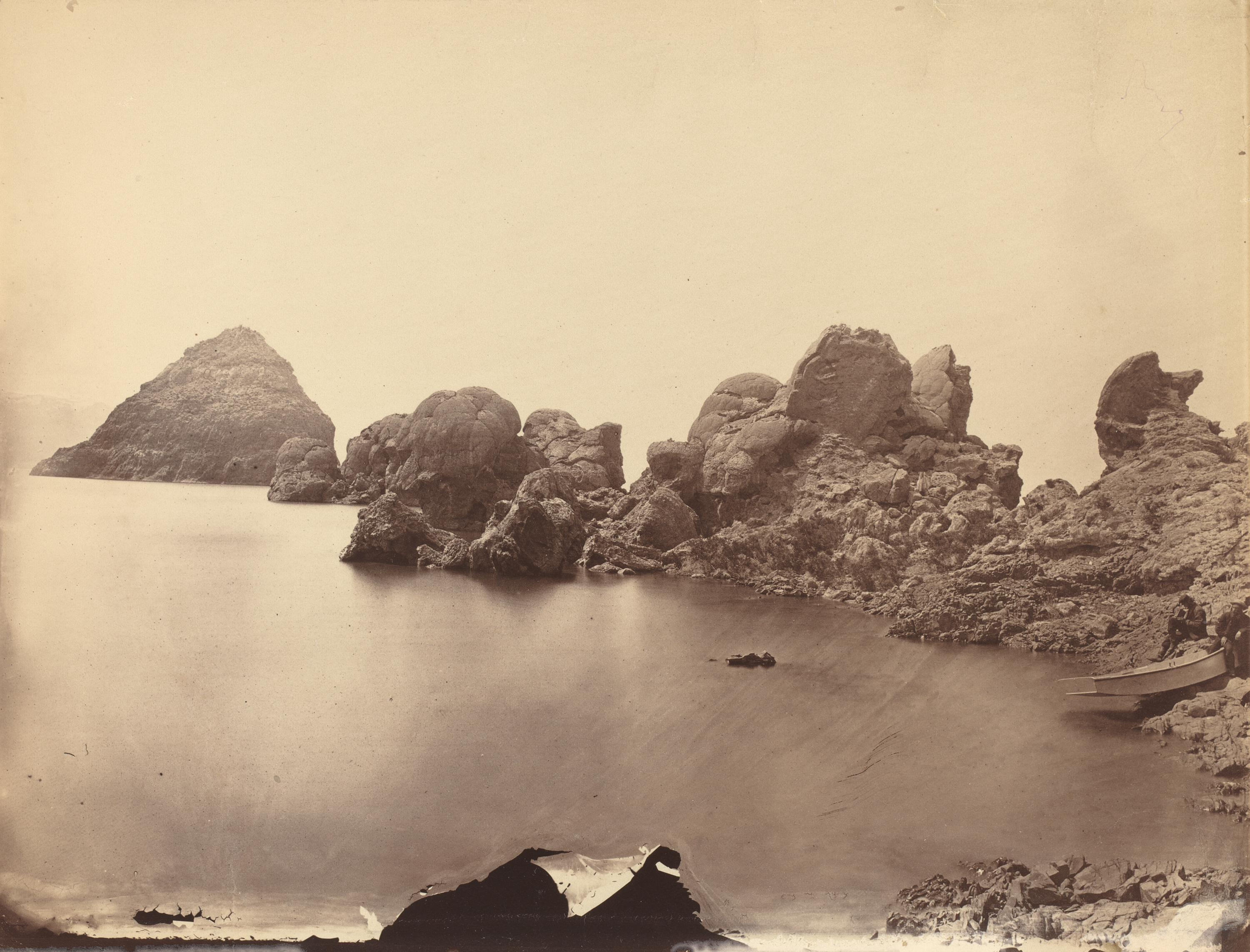
Timothy H. O'Sullivan, Tufa Domes, Pyramid Lake, Nevada, 1867

Lake Lahontan and other Late Pleistocene paleolakes in the Great Basin (such as Lake Bonneville) during the last major global glaciation. Lake Lahontan is shown in the context of western North America and the southern margins of the Laurentide and Cordilleran ice sheets.

A remnant of the Pleistocene Lake Lahontan (~890 feet or 270 meters deep), the lake area has long been inhabited by the Paiute, who ancestrally fished the Tui chub, Cui-ui, and Lahontan cutthroat trout from the lake. The Shoshone and Washo also regularly fished in the lake. According to traditional narratives, the Washo specifically were given fishing rights in Pyramid Lake after assisting the Paiutes in defeating a nearby tribe of giants.

Archeological evidence shows that human populations lived in this area between 9500 B.C.E. and 1400 A.D. Excavations have uncovered tools, weapons, clothing, food, and mummified bodies in the area.

John C. Frémont was the first non-indigenous person to map the lake. The name comes from a large rock formation that resembles a bent pyramid.

In the 19th century, two battles were fought near the lake, major actions in the Paiute War. In the 1960s, a marker was placed commemorating these battles.

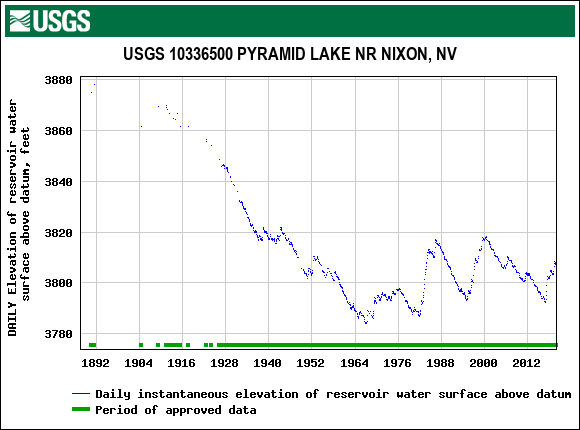
Water levels in the years 1887–2019

Because of water diversion beginning in 1905 by Derby Dam through Truckee Canal to the Lahontan Reservoir, the lake's existence was threatened, and the Paiute sued the Department of the Interior. By the mid-1970s, the lake had lost 80 feet (24 m) of depth, and according to Paiute fisheries officials, the lake's life was seriously under threat. According to documentary filmmaker John Pilger, the irrigation scheme for which water was diverted was an economic failure.

Chronology

- 1860 – The Pyramid Lake War: Paiute natives and Euro-American settlers clashed.
- 1903 – Irrigation diversion of the Truckee via the Derby Dam contributed to the decline and eventual extinction in Pyramid Lake of the Lahontan cutthroat trout, which are now stocked.
- 1936 – The Pyramid Lake Paiute Tribe approved their constitution and by-laws.
- 1987 – A water quality model was completed for the Truckee River.

== Geography ==
Pyramid Lake is located in southeastern Washoe County in western Nevada. It is in an elongated intermontane basin between the Lake Range on the east, the Virginia Mountains on the west, and the Pah Rah Range on the southwest. The Fox Range and the Smoke Creek Desert lie to the north.

In a parallel basin to the east of the Lake Range is Winnemucca Lake, now a dry lake bed. Prior to the construction of the Derby Dam in 1905, both lake levels stood at near 3,880 ft (1,180 m) above sea level. Following the dam's completion, the water levels dropped to 3,867 ft (1,179 m) and 3,853 ft (1,174 m) for Pyramid and Winnemucca, respectively. In 1957, the Pyramid Lake level was at 3,802 ft (1,159 m) and the dry Winnemucca Lake bed at 3,780 ft (1,150 m) had been dry since the 1930s.

Pyramid Lake is the largest remnant of ancient Lake Lahontan, which covered much of northwestern Nevada at the end of the last ice age. It was the deepest point of Lake Lahontan, reaching an estimated 890 feet (270 m) due to its low level relative to the surrounding basins.

Sutcliffe is on the west shore of Pyramid Lake along State Route 445. Nixon is on the Truckee River to the southeast of the lake on State Route 447.

The largest tufa formation, Anaho Island, is home to a large colony of American white pelicans and is restricted for ecological reasons. Access to the Needles, another spectacular tufa formation at the northern end of the lake, has also been restricted due to recent vandalism.

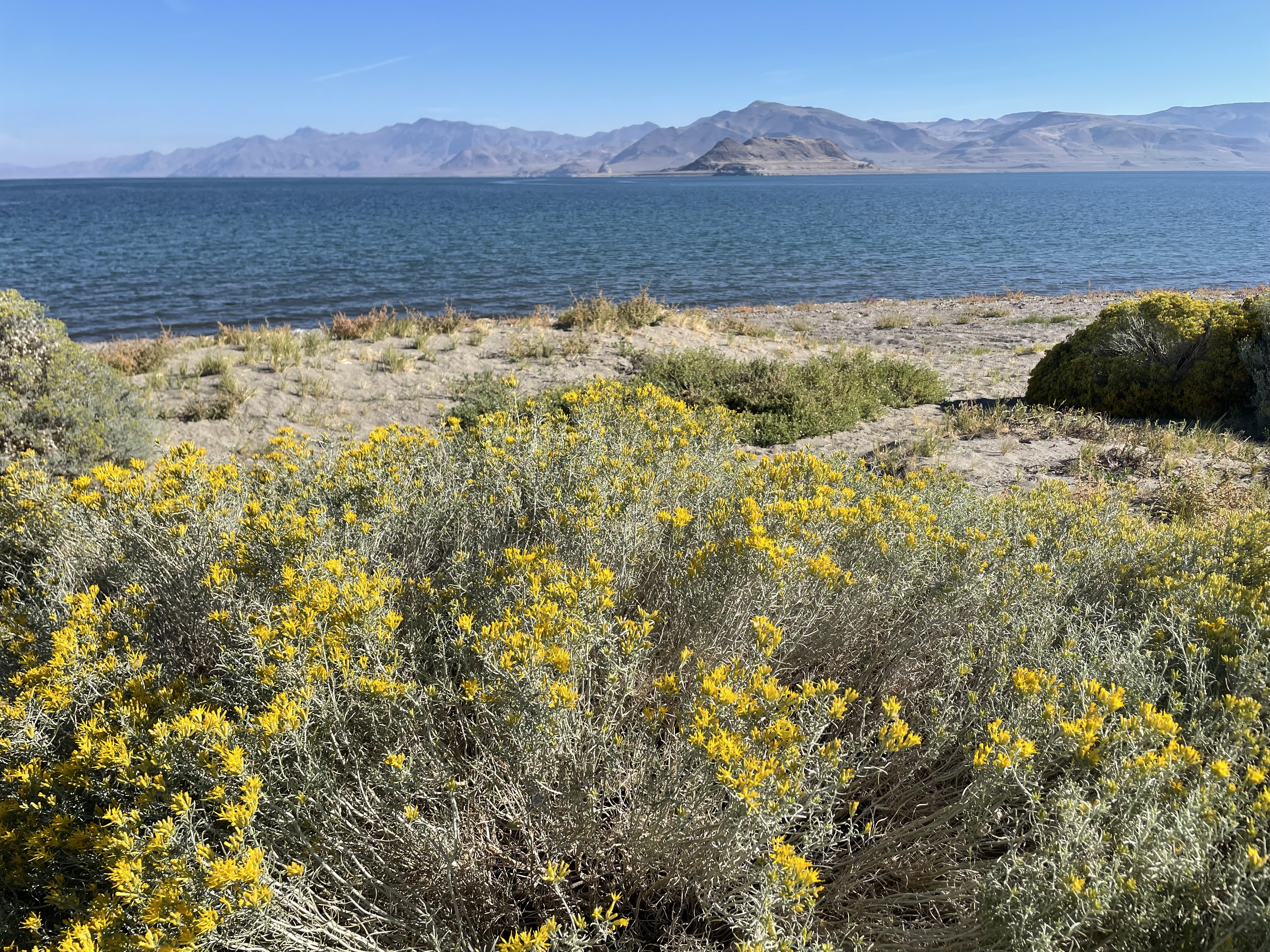
Sagebrush in bloom along lakeshore, October 2023

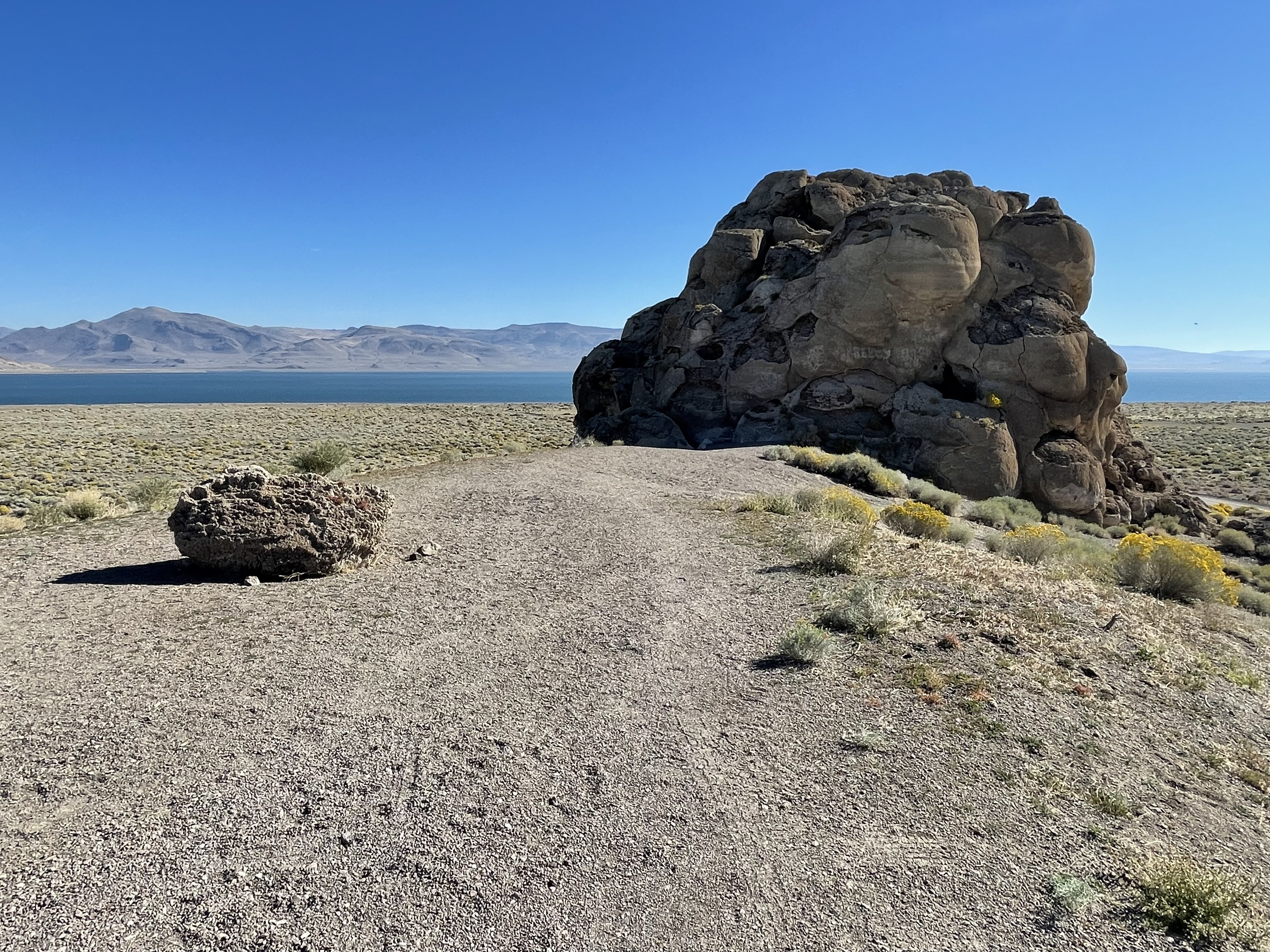
Indian Head Rock on the southwestern shore, October 2023. Tufa formations dot the lakeshore.

=== The Pyramid ===
The Pyramid (39°58′48″N 119°30′06″W), also known as Fremont's Pyramid and Pyramid Island, is a small island near the southeastern shore of the lake. It is located approximately 1.2 miles (2 km) northeast of Anaho Island and slightly less than six miles (9.5 km) from the community of Sutcliffe. The white band seen to the east of the island is composed of calcium carbonate which came from when the lake was at or near its overflow point.

== Fish ==
Major fish species include the Cui-ui lakesucker, which is endemic to Pyramid Lake, the Tui chub and Lahontan cutthroat trout (the world record cutthroat trout was caught in Pyramid Lake). The former is endangered, and the latter is threatened. Both species were critical to the Paiute people in pre-contact times. The Lahontan cutthroat was called "Hoopagaih" by the Paiute people. As they are both obligate freshwater spawners, they rely on sufficient inflow to allow them to run up the Truckee River to spawn, otherwise their eggs will not hatch.

Diversion of the Truckee for irrigation at Derby Dam beginning in 1905 reduced inflow and the lake level to such an extent that stream flow is rarely sufficient for spawning. The Truckee Canal diverts water used to irrigate croplands in Fallon. The dam lacks fish ladders, which prevents upstream spawning. By 1939 the Lahontan cutthroat trout (the "salmon-trout" as described by Frémont) became extinct in Pyramid Lake and its tributaries. They were replaced with hatchery trout from outside the watershed.

However, in 1979 a remnant population of the original Pyramid Lake cutthroat trout was discovered in a small brook on Pilot Peak, on the Nevada/Utah border, by Dr. Robert Behnke of Colorado State University while he was looking for the Bonneville cutthroat trout, another subspecies of the cutthroat trout. The fish were tiny and in poor condition, but Behnke identified the fingerlings as the missing Pyramid Lake variety.

Subsequent DNA testing of a museum specimen has shown his identification to be correct. The fish had been dumped in the creek in the early 20th century. A brood stock was raised at the U.S. Fish and Wildlife Service's Lahontan National Fish Hatchery in Gardnerville, Nevada, and a successful reintroduction effort was mounted by the USFWS and the Pyramid Lake Paiute Tribe. As of 2017, 24 pound Pyramid Lake Lahontan cutthroat trout are again being caught from the Lake's waters.

The fish are doing very well, according to the USFWS project head Lisa Heki. The fish have also been placed in California's Fallen Leaf Lake, upstream of Pyramid Lake, and elsewhere. Fish populations are now sustained by several tribally-run fish hatcheries and state and federal agencies. The Pyramid Lake Lahontan cutthroat trout is one of the largest inland trout species in the world.

== Climate ==
The following data are for the census-designated place (CDP) of Sutcliffe, NV, located on the shore of Pyramid Lake.

Climate data for Sutcliffe, NV
Month	Jan	Feb	Mar	Apr	May	Jun	Jul	Aug	Sep	Oct	Nov	Dec	Year
Record high °F (°C)	65 (18)	73 (23)	76 (24)	92 (33)	99 (37)	103 (39)	105 (41)	103 (39)	98 (37)	90 (32)	79 (26)	73 (23)	105 (41)
Mean daily maximum °F (°C)	44.3 (6.8)	47.7 (8.7)	55.2 (12.9)	61.5 (16.4)	70.0 (21.1)	79.8 (26.6)	88.8 (31.6)	87.4 (30.8)	78.5 (25.8)	65.5 (18.6)	53.2 (11.8)	45.0 (7.2)	64.7 (18.2)
Mean daily minimum °F (°C)	29.0 (−1.7)	31.2 (−0.4)	35.8 (2.1)	40.0 (4.4)	47.5 (8.6)	55.4 (13.0)	63.3 (17.4)	62.8 (17.1)	55.3 (12.9)	45.2 (7.3)	36.3 (2.4)	29.6 (−1.3)	44.3 (6.8)
Record low °F (°C)	9 (−13)	−4 (−20)	10 (−12)	22 (−6)	28 (−2)	36 (2)	46 (8)	43 (6)	29 (−2)	14 (−10)	14 (−10)	−8 (−22)	−8 (−22)
Average precipitation inches (mm)	1.35 (34)	0.76 (19)	0.70 (18)	0.44 (11)	0.63 (16)	0.56 (14)	0.17 (4.3)	0.18 (4.6)	0.26 (6.6)	0.46 (12)	0.85 (22)	0.95 (24)	7.31 (185.5)
Average snowfall inches (cm)	2.0 (5.1)	1.3 (3.3)	0.7 (1.8)	0.2 (0.51)	0 (0)	0 (0)	0 (0)	0 (0)	0 (0)	0.1 (0.25)	0.3 (0.76)	0.9 (2.3)	5.5 (14.02)
Source: http://www.wrcc.dri.edu/cgi-bin/cliMAIN.pl?nv7953

At 8b the hardiness zone of the lake area is the highest in northern Nevada.

== Water quality ==
Because of the endangered species present and because the Lake Tahoe Basin comprises the headwaters of the Truckee River, Pyramid Lake has been the focus of several water quality investigations, the most detailed starting in the mid-1980s. Under direction of the U.S. Environmental Protection Agency, a comprehensive dynamic water quality computer model, the DSSAM Model was developed to analyze impacts of a variety of land use and wastewater management decisions throughout the 3,120-square-mile (8,100 km^{2}) Truckee River Basin. Analytes addressed included nitrogen, reactive phosphate, total dissolved solids, dissolved oxygen and nine other parameters. Based on the use of the model, some decisions have been influenced to enhance Pyramid Lake water quality and aid the viability of Pyramid Lake biota. Another contaminant of interest is mercury, introduced to Pyramid Lake from the Truckee River. It is suggested that mercury remediation efforts be carefully considered such that methylmercury production is not enhanced.

Salinity increased from 0.5 to 0.7 ounces per US gallon (3.7 to 5 g/L), and the pH level is about 9. Temperature ranges between near freezing (32 °F (0 °C)) to over 68 °F (20 °C).

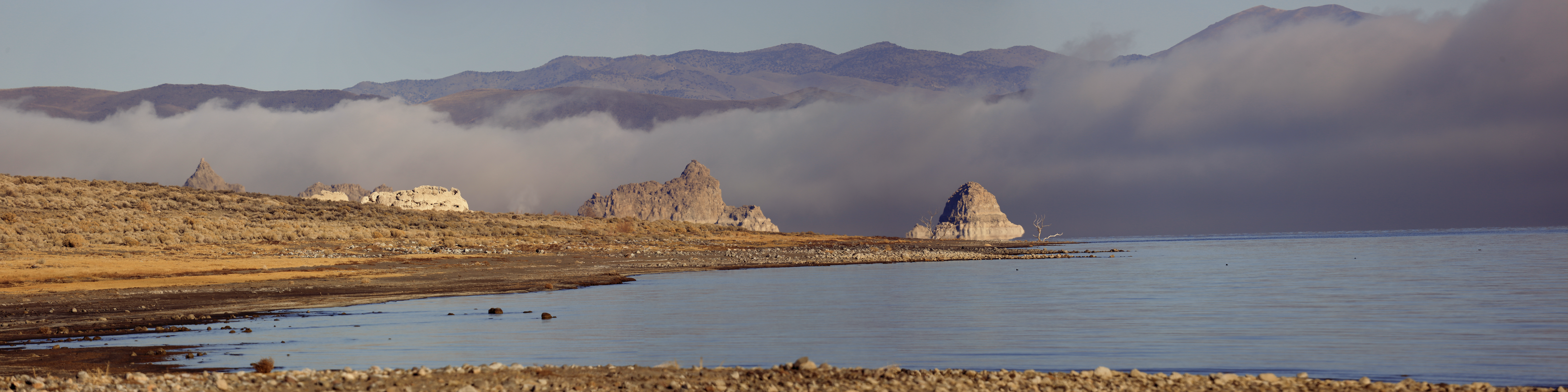
Pyramid Lake in 2013

== Media ==
Pyramid Lake was used as a stand-in for the Sea of Galilee in the 1965 biblical film, The Greatest Story Ever Told. Also, in 1961, part of The Misfits was filmed nearby.
Pyramid Lake is a 2013 fiction thriller by Paul Draker, set near modern-day Pyramid Lake.

== See also ==
- Black Rock Desert
- Carson Sink
- Honey Lake
- Humboldt Sink
- Walker Lake (Nevada)
