= Nixon, Nevada =

- CDP
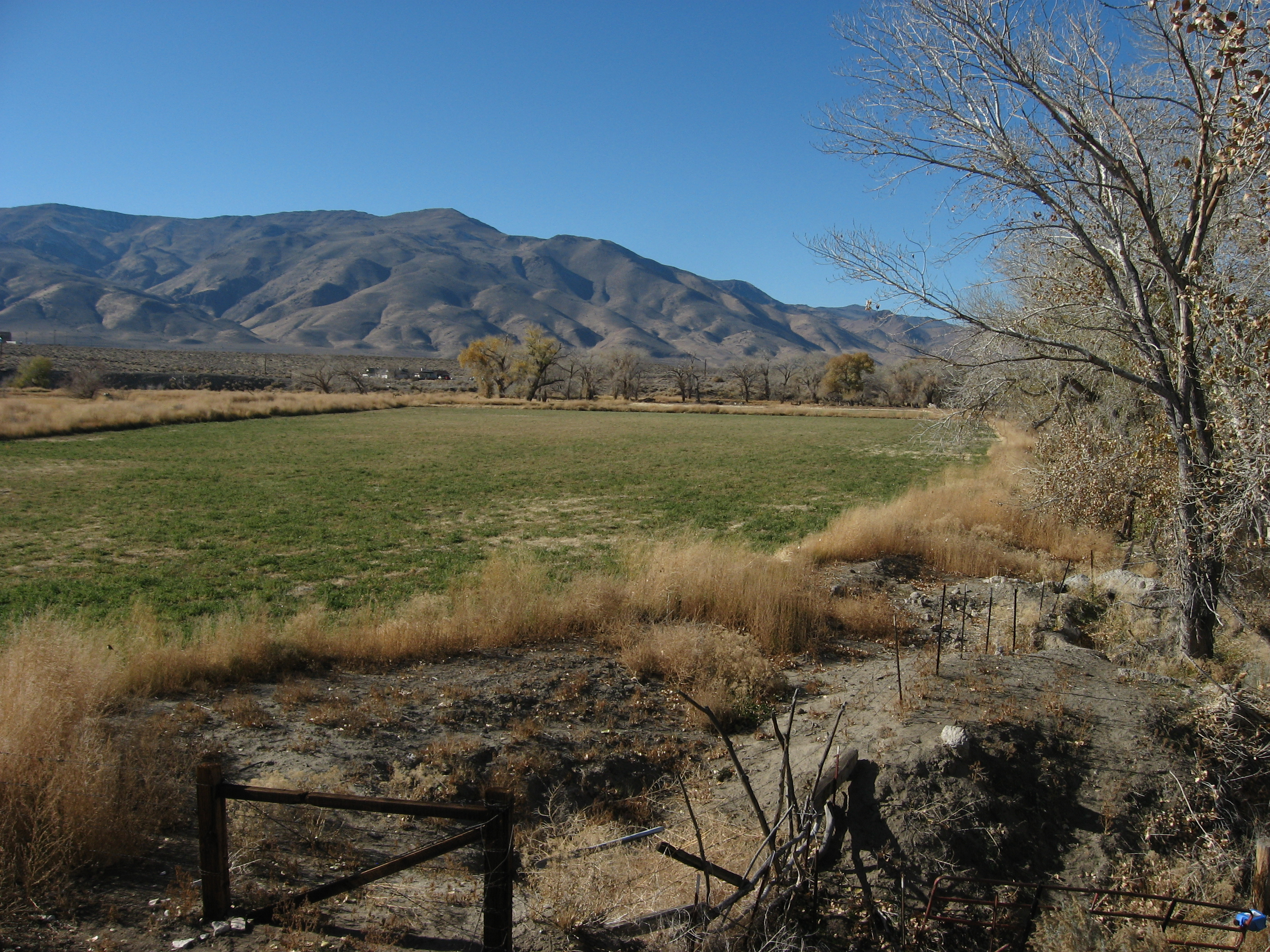

- Location of Nixon, Nevada
- Coordinates: 39°49′51″N 119°21′40″W
- Country: United States
- State: Nevada

Area
  - Total: 6.33 sq mi (16.39 km^{2})
  - Land: 6.33 sq mi (16.39 km^{2})
  - Water: 0 sq mi (0.00 km^{2})
- Elevation: 3,914 ft (1,193 m)

Population (2020)
  - Total: 464
  - Density: 73.3/sq mi (28.31/km^{2})
- Time zone: UTC-8 (Pacific (PST))
  - Summer (DST): UTC-7 (PDT)
- ZIP code: 89424
- Area code: 775
- FIPS code: 32-51200
- GNIS feature ID: 0858114

Nixon is a census-designated place (CDP) in Washoe County, Nevada, USA. As of the 2020 census, Nixon had a population of 464. It is part of the Reno–Sparks Metropolitan Statistical Area. It is the seat of tribal government of the Paiute Pyramid Lake Indian Reservation and home to the tribe's Museum and Visitor Center. Nixon lies along State Route 446 which connects the settlement to Sutcliffe and Pyramid Lake.

== Geography ==
According to the United States Census Bureau, the CDP has a total area of 6.3 square miles (16 km^{2}), all land.

== Origin ==
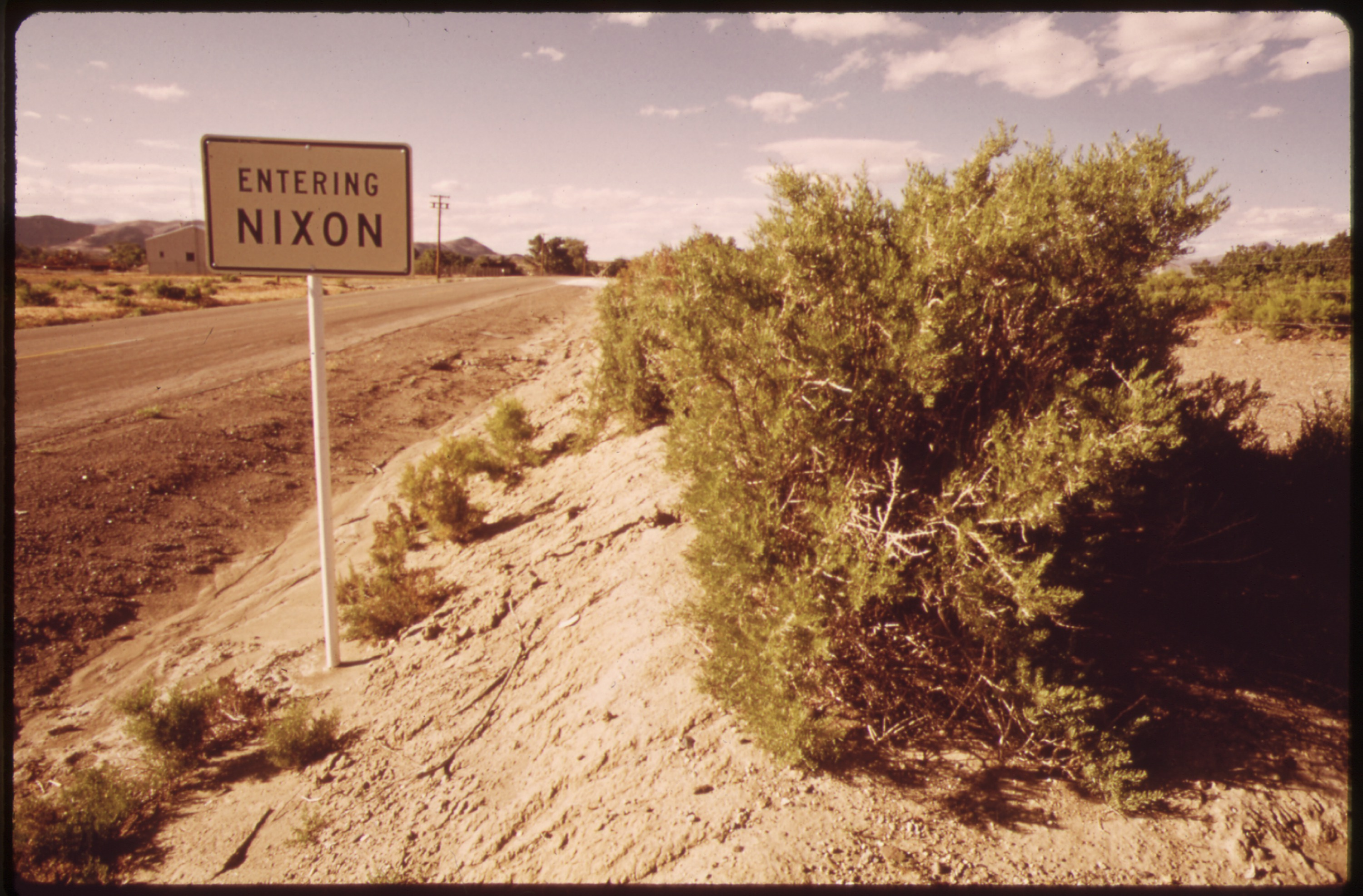
Nixon, 1973

Nixon was named in honor of Senator George Stuart Nixon (R), who represented Nevada in the U.S. Senate from 1905 to 1912.

== Demographics ==
Historical population
Census	Pop.	Note	%±
2020	464		—
U.S. Decennial Census

At the 2000 census, there were 418 people, 132 households, and 104 families in the CDP. The population density was 66.2 inhabitants per square mile (25.6/km^{2}). There were 144 housing units at an average density of 22.8 per square mile (8.8/km^{2}). The racial makeup of the CDP was 2% White, 96% Native American, <1% Asian, <1% Pacific Islander, and 1% from two or more races. Hispanic or Latino of any race were 5%.

Of the 132 households, 49% had children under the age of 18 living with them, 37% were married couples living together, 35% had a female householder with no husband present, and 21% were non-families. 17% of households were one person and 5% were one person aged 65 or older. The average household size was 3.17 and the average family size was 3.59.

The age distribution was 39% under the age of 18, 10% from 18 to 24, 29% from 25 to 44, 14% from 45 to 64, and 10% 65 or older. The median age was 26 years. For every 100 females, there were 95.3 males. For every 100 females age 18 and over, there were 74.8 males.

The median household income was $25,417 and the median family income was $28,906. Males had a median income of $26,250 versus $22,250 for females. The per capita income for the CDP was $9,926. About 22% of families and 26% of the population were below the poverty line, including 30% of those under age 18 and 26% of those age 65 or over.

== Education ==
Washoe County School District is the area school district.

The Bureau of Indian Education-contracted Pyramid Lake Schools is in Nixon.
