= Pyramid Lake Paiute Tribe Reservation =

Native American reservation in Nevada, United States

Pyramid Lake Paiute Tribe Reservation kuyuuiba
- Reservation
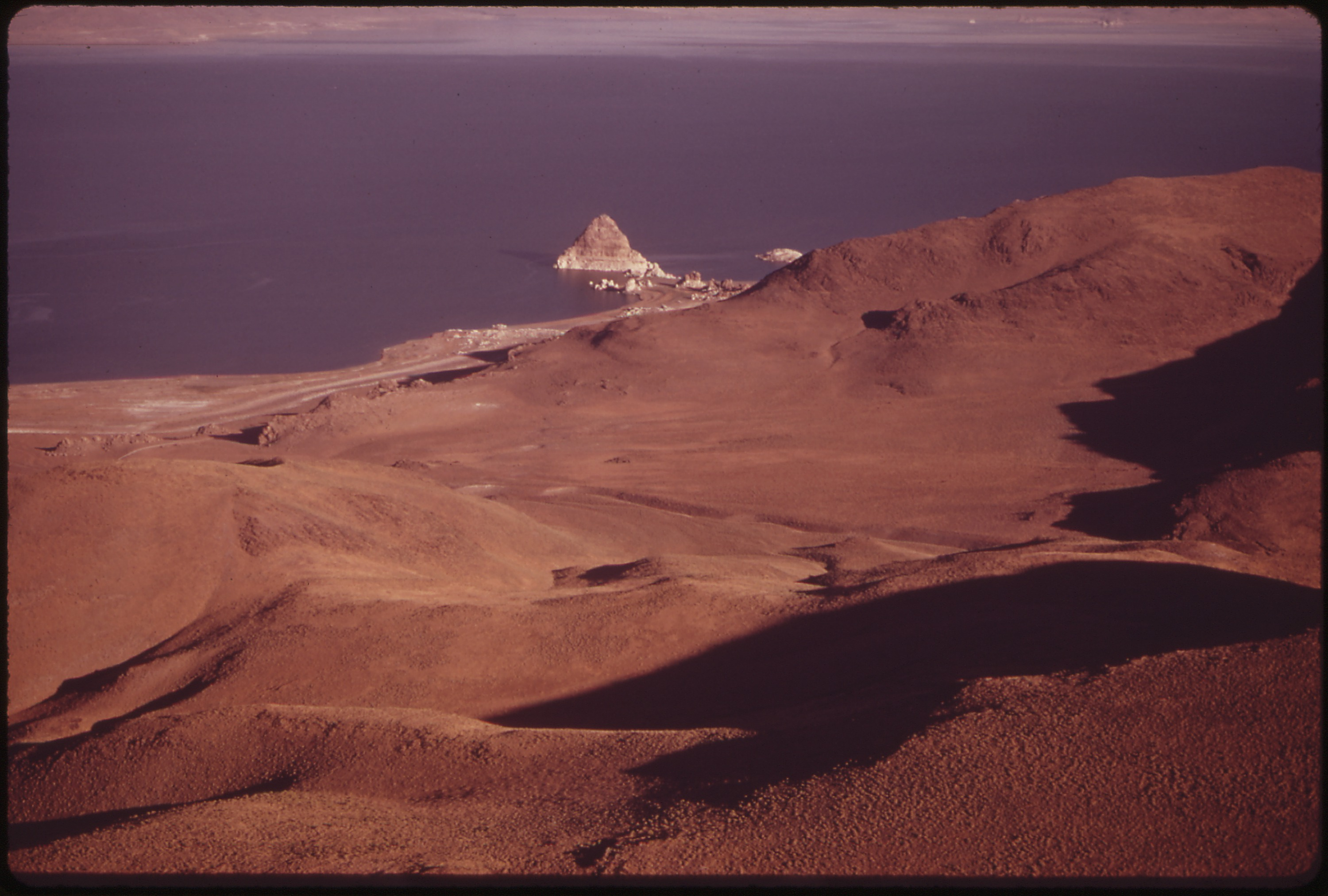
- Pyramid Lake

- Location of Pyramid Lake Indian Reservation
- Coordinates: 40°04′49″N 119°32′13″W

Government
  - Type: Tribal Council
  - Body: Pyramid Lake Paiute Tribe

Area
  - Total: 1,922 km^{2} (742.2 sq mi)
  - Land: 1,469 km^{2} (567.2 sq mi)
  - Water: 450 km^{2} (175 sq mi)
- Elevation: 1,035 m (3,397 ft)

Population (2017)
  - Total: 1,300 (on reservation); 2,288 (enrolled members)
- Website: plpt.nsn.us

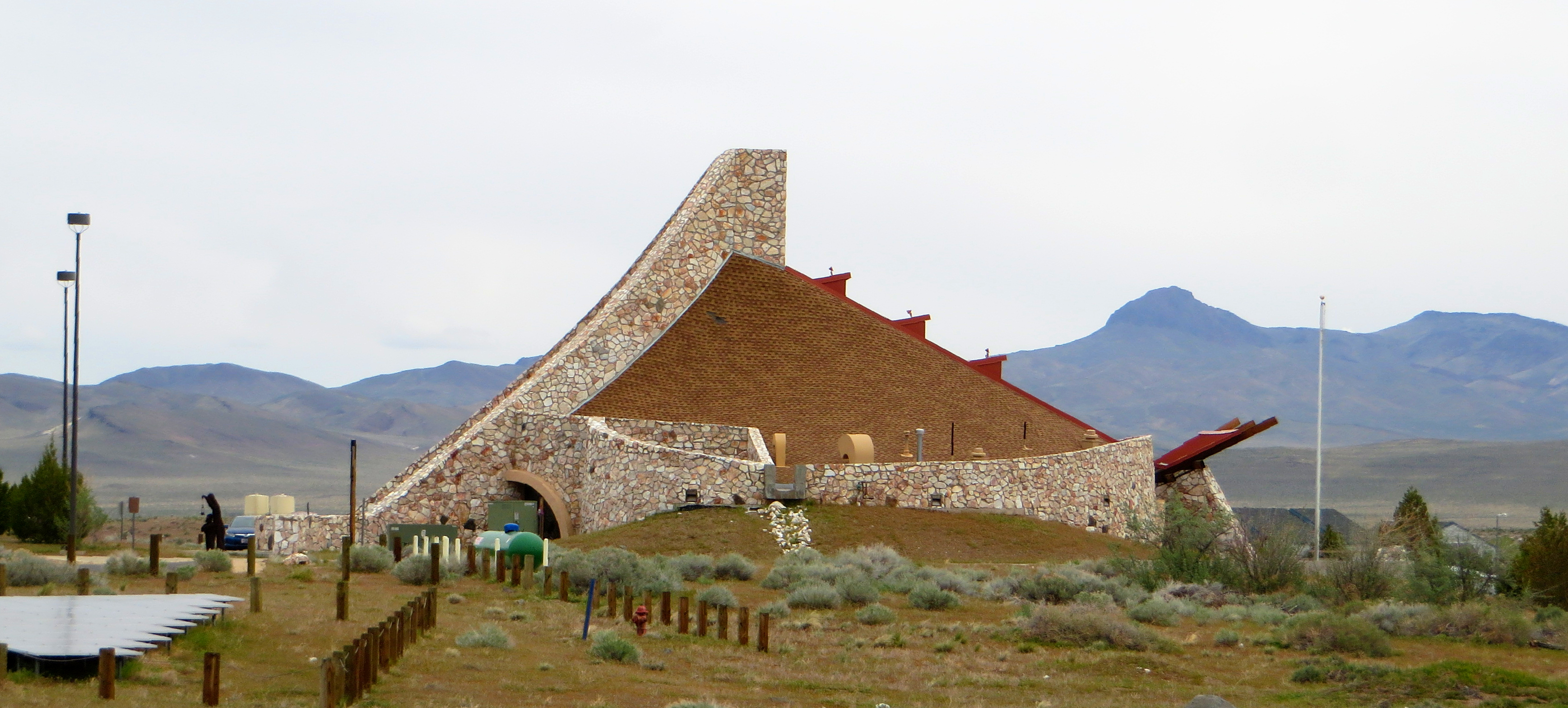
Pyramid Lake Museum

The Pyramid Lake Paiute Tribe Reservation (Northern Paiute: kuyuuiba) is an Indian Reservation in northwestern Nevada, approximately 35 miles (56 km) northeast of Reno, in Washoe, Storey, and Lyon counties.

It is governed by the federally recognized Pyramid Lake Paiute Tribe, which represents two Northern Paiute bands, the larger Kuyuidökadö (Cui Yui Ticutta) ("Cui-ui-Fish-Eaters") and the smaller Tasiget tuviwarai ("Those who live amidst the mountains"). The reservation lies almost entirely in Washoe County (99.88%), with small amounts of land in the other two counties (at the southern end, near the city of Fernley).

In 1993, the population of the reservation was 1,603 individuals. At that time there were 2,253 enrolled members of the tribe. The 2000 census reported a population of 1,734 on the reservation.

Together with the Walker River Paiute tribe (two Northern Paiute bands: Aga'idökadö (Agai Ticutta): "Cutthroat trout Eaters", and Pakwidökadö (Pugwi Ticutta): "Chub carp Eaters"), in 2016 the Pyramid Lake band successfully sued in federal court in a civil rights case to force the state to provide polling places on the reservation. Otherwise, members had to travel many miles to reach a polling place. Early voting at Pyramid Lake reservation started October 22, and during the first two days, the number of voters was double that in the 2012 presidential election.

In October 2016, under the Nevada Native Nations Land Act, the Pyramid Lake Tribe was one of six federally recognized tribes in Nevada to have additional lands put into trust for their reservations. The Pyramid Lake Paiute Tribe is to receive approximately 6,357 acres (25.7 km^{2}) of Bureau of Land Management (BLM) land. Gaming is prohibited on the new lands.

== Background ==
The reservation has 742.2 sq mi (1,922 km^{2}) in land area, and includes all of Pyramid Lake, and all of the Truckee River from the Big Bend north. The reservation is centered on Pyramid Lake, which comprises 25% of the reservation's area. The reservation also includes a sliver of Winnemucca Lake, most of the Lake Range, portions of the Virginia Mountains and Pah Rah Range, and the southern end of the Smoke Creek Desert.

Three communities have developed on the reservation. Wadsworth, the largest, is located near the Big Bend of the Truckee at the southern end of the reservation, just north of the non-reservation town of Fernley. The seat of tribal government is located at Nixon, at the southern end of Pyramid Lake. Sutcliffe is located on the western shore of the lake. A few outlying ranches are located along the Truckee River between Wadsworth and Nixon.

The reservation land was first set aside for the Northern Paiute by request of the Bureau of Indian Affairs in 1859. The reservation was not surveyed until 1865. The status of the reservation was very uncertain until President Ulysses S. Grant affirmed its existence by executive order on March 23, 1874. At that time the creation of reservations by the executive branch was novel; most previous reservations were created by treaty or congressional legislation. Subsequent court decisions have affirmed the validity of reservations created by the executive branch, and have set the establishment date for the Pyramid Lake Reservation at 1859, not 1874. This earlier date is important both with regard to the priority date of tribal water rights, and the status of non-tribal claims to land within the reservation.

The tribe has fought a long series of legal battles on both these issues. The Northern Paiute were awarded a settlement in their lands claim case in 1968.

In October 2016 the Nevada Native Nations Land Act (PL No: 114-232) authorized the federal government to put certain public lands of the Bureau of Land Management (BLM) and Forest Service in the state into trust for six of the nine federally recognized tribes in the state. These transfers will expand their reservations and make their bases more sustainable. The government is putting 6,357 acres (25.7 km^{2}) acres of BLM land into trust for the Pyramid Lake Reservation. Gaming is prohibited on these new lands.

== Ancestry ==
As of 1970, one source claimed that residents of the reservation included descendants of Chief Winnemucca, an early 19th-century Paiute leader.

== Environmental factors ==
The Lahontan cutthroat trout fishery at Pyramid Lake attracts many anglers from the Reno area and beyond. Sale of fishing licenses and boating permits is a large source of revenue for the tribe. Prior to the construction of the Derby Dam and the diversion of water from the Truckee River for irrigation, the lake supported a commercial fishery. This was an even larger revenue source for the tribe.

Historically water levels have been declining in Pyramid Lake; in addition, water quality has been adversely affected by upstream discharges including point and non–point sources. A number of studies have been conducted on Pyramid Lake including the application of the DSSAM hydrological river model to examine nitrogen, reactive phosphorus, dissolved oxygen and other water quality parameters.

== Political activism ==
Native Americans in Nevada have become more politically active in presidential and other elections, as they have in other states. They have been seeking more equitable access to polling places and treatment by county and state officials.

Led by chairman Vinton Hawley, the Pyramid Lake Paiute joined with the Walker River Paiute in a successful civil rights suit under the Voting Rights Act in federal court against the state government to gain polling places on their homelands in 2016. They have been disadvantaged in the past by having to travel excessive distances to vote in elections, which had reduced participation. They argued that the state had set up satellite offices in wealthy, mostly white neighborhoods. The Justice Department sided with the plaintiffs. When the counties said the change would cost too much and the state said that it could not intervene, the Justice Department "said in a new filing Monday they appear to be confusing voting rights with 'voting convenience.'" The court decided in favor of the two Paiute tribes and ordered officials to set up satellite offices. Early voting at Pyramid Lake reservation started October 22, and during the first two days, the number of voters was double the total in the 2012 presidential election.

Hawley is chairman of the Inter-Tribal Council of Nevada, representing many other tribes that also have difficulty with access to polling places. On behalf of the council, he has "urged Secretary of State Barbara Cegavske to direct counties to open [homeland] polling places for nine more tribes, including some where ballot boxes are 200-plus miles away, round trip." He also urged the Secretary of State for Nevada to improve conditions at local county polling places for urban Indians, who testified in the suit to being made uncomfortable at most offices.
