= Sutcliffe, Nevada =

- CDP
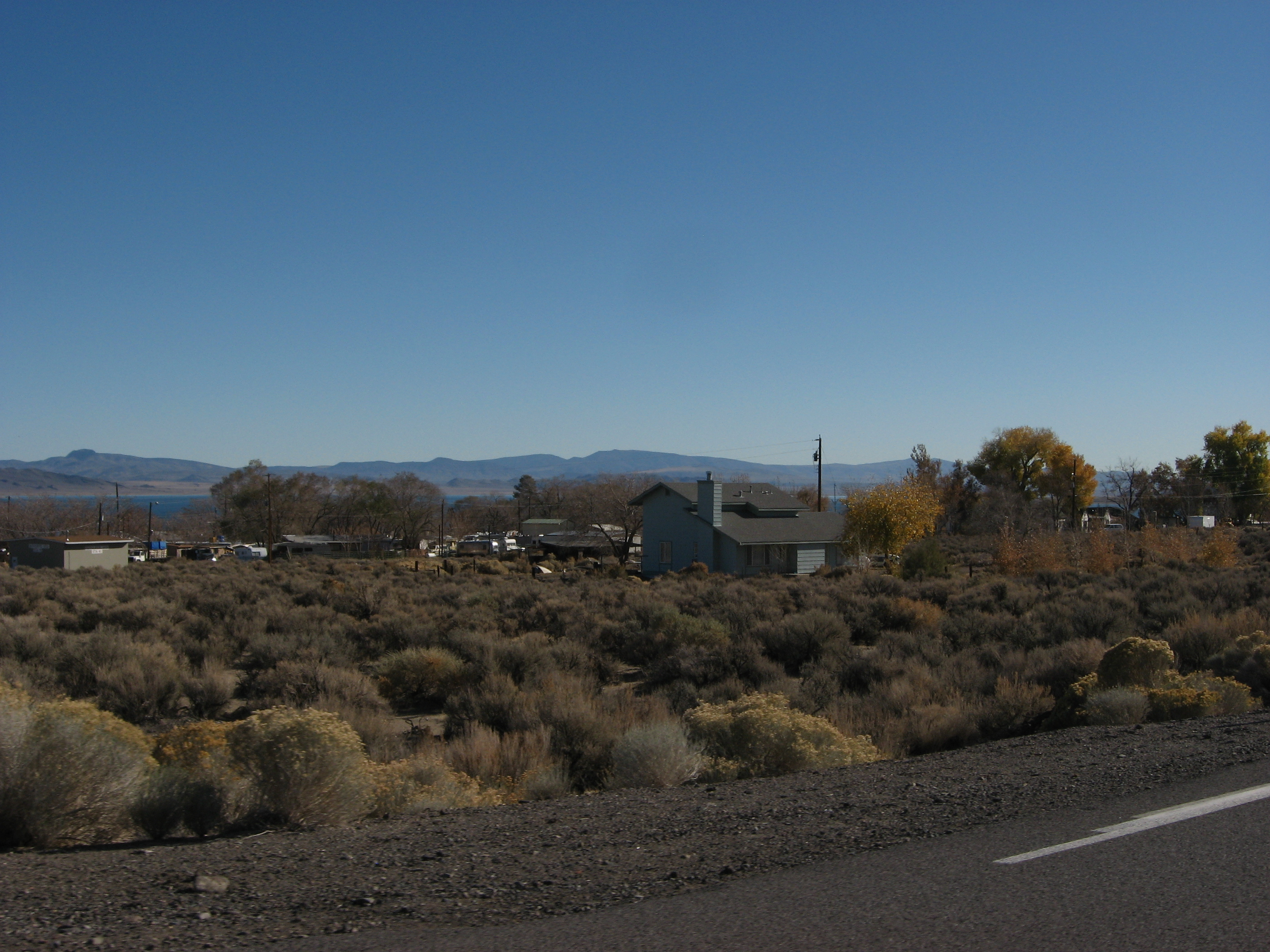
- Sutcliffe, Nevada

- Location of Sutcliffe, Nevada

- Location in the United States
- Coordinates: 39°56′50″N 119°36′13″W
- Country: United States
- State: Nevada

Area
  - Total: 10.00 sq mi (25.89 km^{2})
  - Land: 10.00 sq mi (25.89 km^{2})
  - Water: 0 sq mi (0.00 km^{2})
- Elevation: 3,888 ft (1,185 m)

Population (2020)
  - Total: 282
  - Density: 28.2/sq mi (10.89/km^{2})
- Time zone: UTC-8 (Pacific (PST))
  - Summer (DST): UTC-7 (PDT)
- ZIP code: 89510
- Area code: 775
- FIPS code: 32-71800
- GNIS feature ID: 0858208

Sutcliffe is a census-designated place (CDP) in Washoe County, Nevada, United States. As of the 2020 census, Sutcliffe had a population of 282. It is part of the Reno–Sparks Metropolitan Statistical Area. Sutcliffe lies along State Route 446 which connects the settlement to Nixon and Pyramid Lake.

== Geography ==
Sutcliffe is located at 39°56′50″N 119°36′13″W (39.947238, -119.603603).

According to the United States Census Bureau, the CDP has a total area of 10.0 square miles (26 km^{2}), all of it land.

The core settlement is located on the western banks of Pyramid Lake.

For climate data for Sutcliffe, see: Pyramid Lake (Nevada)#Climate

=== Climate ===
Climate data for Sutcliffe, Nevada (1991–2020)
Month	Jan	Feb	Mar	Apr	May	Jun	Jul	Aug	Sep	Oct	Nov	Dec	Year
Mean daily maximum °F (°C)	42.8 (6.0)	46.6 (8.1)	53.6 (12.0)	60.0 (15.6)	69.0 (20.6)	78.7 (25.9)	87.5 (30.8)	86.0 (30.0)	77.7 (25.4)	64.0 (17.8)	51.7 (10.9)	43.7 (6.5)	63.4 (17.5)
Daily mean °F (°C)	36.2 (2.3)	39.3 (4.1)	44.9 (7.2)	50.2 (10.1)	58.8 (14.9)	67.8 (19.9)	76.1 (24.5)	75.0 (23.9)	67.4 (19.7)	55.3 (12.9)	44.4 (6.9)	36.9 (2.7)	54.4 (12.4)
Mean daily minimum °F (°C)	29.6 (−1.3)	32.0 (0.0)	36.1 (2.3)	40.3 (4.6)	48.6 (9.2)	56.9 (13.8)	64.7 (18.2)	64.1 (17.8)	57.1 (13.9)	46.6 (8.1)	37.1 (2.8)	30.2 (−1.0)	45.3 (7.4)
Average precipitation inches (mm)	1.32 (34)	0.80 (20)	0.77 (20)	0.49 (12)	0.62 (16)	0.50 (13)	0.22 (5.6)	0.18 (4.6)	0.27 (6.9)	0.51 (13)	0.76 (19)	0.98 (25)	7.42 (189.1)
Average snowfall inches (cm)	1.3 (3.3)	1.0 (2.5)	0.6 (1.5)	0.2 (0.51)	0.0 (0.0)	0.0 (0.0)	0.0 (0.0)	0.0 (0.0)	0.0 (0.0)	0.0 (0.0)	0.4 (1.0)	0.7 (1.8)	4.2 (10.61)
Source: NOAA

== Demographics ==
Historical population
Census	Pop.	Note	%±
2020	282		—
U.S. Decennial Census

As of the census of 2000, there were 281 people, 105 households, and 70 families residing in the CDP. The population density was 28.1 inhabitants per square mile (10.8/km^{2}). There were 113 housing units at an average density of 11.3 per square mile (4.4/km^{2}). The racial makeup of the CDP was 41.64% White, 47.69% Native American, 0.71% Pacific Islander, 2.14% from other races, and 7.83% from two or more races. Hispanic or Latino of any race were 5.69% of the population.

There were 105 households, out of which 30.5% had children under the age of 18 living with them, 35.2% were married couples living together, 20.0% had a female householder with no husband present, and 33.3% were non-families. 24.8% of all households were made up of individuals, and 11.4% had someone living alone who was 65 years of age or older. The average household size was 2.68 and the average family size was 3.21.

In the CDP, the population was spread out, with 31.7% under the age of 18, 7.5% from 18 to 24, 23.1% from 25 to 44, 26.3% from 45 to 64, and 11.4% who were 65 years of age or older. The median age was 37 years. For every 100 females, there were 109.7 males. For every 100 females age 18 and over, there were 97.9 males.

The median income for a household in the CDP was $31,250, and the median income for a family was $31,875. Males had a median income of $28,750 versus $22,292 for females. The per capita income for the CDP was $13,629. About 27.4% of families and 30.5% of the population were below the poverty line, including 41.7% of those under the age of eighteen and 11.1% of those 65 or over.
