= Nevada State Route 338 =

Highway in Nevada

State Route 338
- Sweetwater Road
- SR 338 highlighted in red

Route information
- Maintained by NDOT
- Length: 30.896 mi (49.722 km)
- Existed: 1976–present

Major junctions
- South end: SR 182 at the CA state line north of Bridgeport, CA
- North end: SR 208 near Smith

Location
- Country: United States
- State: Nevada

Highway system
- Nevada State Highway System; Interstate; US; State; Pre‑1976; Scenic
← SR 322	→ SR 339

State Route 338 (SR 338) is a state highway in Lyon County, Nevada, United States. It connects the towns of Smith and Wellington to the California state line north of Bridgeport, California. Much of the route has served as a road through this section of Nevada since at least 1919, and was known as State Route 22 from the 1920s until the late 1970s.

== Route description ==
The majority of the route lies within the Humboldt-Toiyabe National Forest. The road begins as a continuation of California State Route 182 12 miles (19 km) north of Bridgeport. That route, which follows the East Walker River as it flows from the Bridgeport Reservoir, crosses the Nevada state line east of the Sweetwater Mountains. SR 338 follows the river northeast for about 3 miles (4.8 km) before diverting northwest, away from the water's course. The route eventually passes the former town of Sweetwater as it climbs up toward the 6,812-foot (2,076 m) Sweetwater Summit.

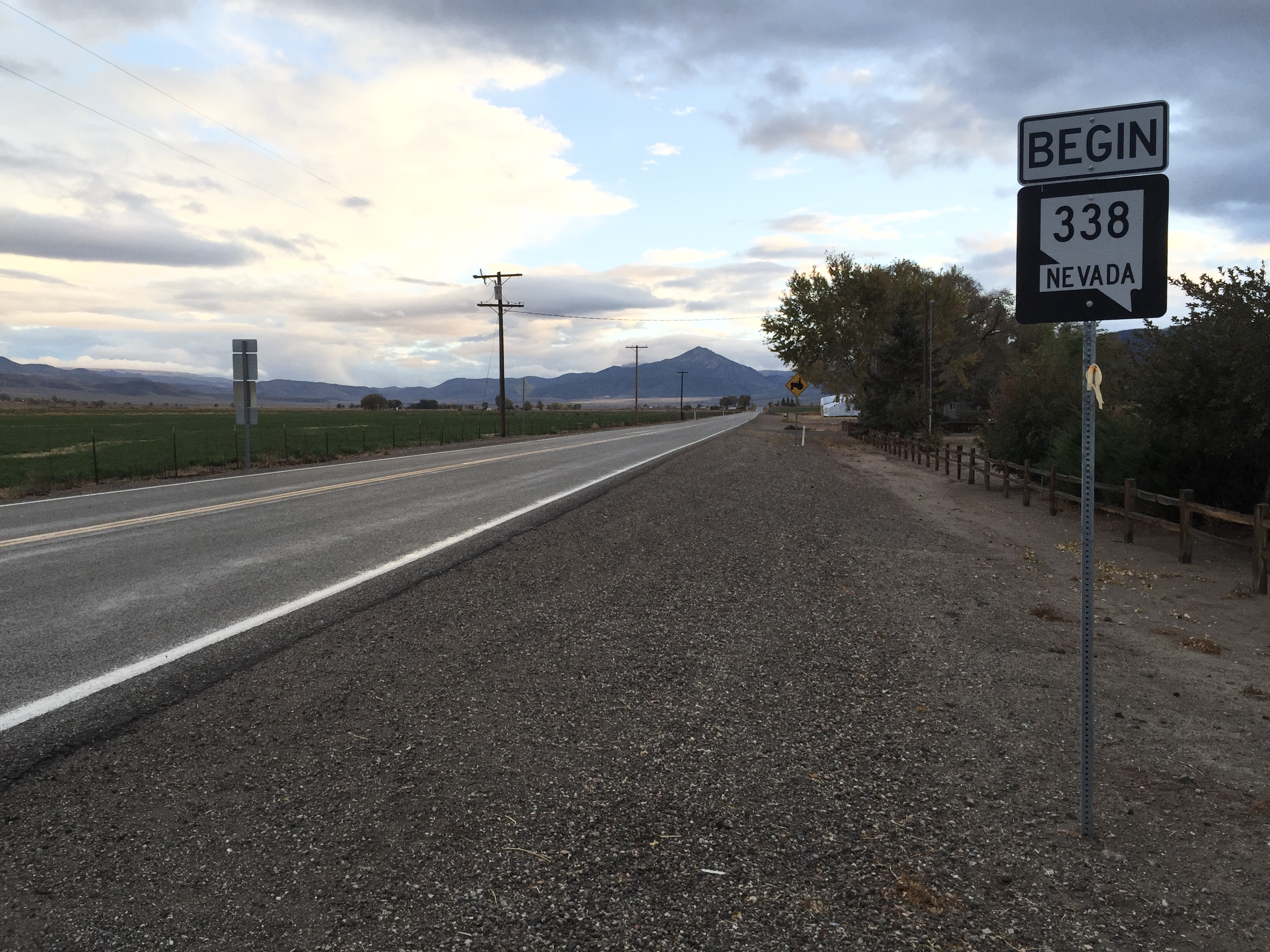
View from the north end of SR 338 looking southbound

As SR 338 heads down from the summit, it passes between the Wellington Hills to the west and the Pine Grove Hills to the east. The route crosses several small creeks as it heads north entering the Smith Valley. Farmlands come into view as the highway approaches its junction with Wellington Road (SR 829), which heads towards Wellington and points west. State Route 338 continues due north from here, heading through more farm tracts before ending at a "Y" junction with State Route 208 just south of Smith.

== History ==
Most of SR 338 was previously known as State Route 22.

An unimproved road connecting the Smith Valley to Sweetwater and Bridgeport existed as early as 1917. By 1929, the road had been made part of the state's highway system as State Route 22. The route, which largely followed present-day Sweetwater Road, connected directly to State Route 3 (now SR 208) on the north end at Wellington, via the Wellington Cutoff, instead of the present northern terminus near Smith. Earthwork improvements were made on SR 22 by 1936, but the northern end of the route would not be paved until 1948 with the remainder receiving pavement two years later. The north–south road segment connecting SR 22 to Smith appears to have been constructed by 1952.

After receiving upgrades in the early 1950s, no additional changes were made to State Route 22 until Nevada began renumbering its state highways in the late 1970s. During the renumbering process, the majority of SR 22 was renumbered as State Route 338—this also included the separate north–south link south of Smith. The portion of SR 22 that followed the Wellington Cutoff became State Route 829 in the same process. The Nevada Department of Transportation approved the new highway numbers on July 1, 1976, with the route change first shown on the 1978–79 state highway map. The highways have remained unchanged since.

== Major intersections ==
The entire route is in Lyon County.

Location	mi	km	Destinations	Notes
	0.00	0.00	SR 182 – Bridgeport	Continuation beyond California state line
			SR 829 to SR 208 – Wellington, Carson City	
Smith	30.90	49.73	SR 208 – Smith, Yerington	
1.000 mi = 1.609 km; 1.000 km = 0.621 mi
