= Wovoka Wilderness =

Wilderness area in Nevada, United States

- IUCN category Ib (wilderness area)
- Location within the United States
- Location: Lyon County, Nevada, United States
- Nearest city: Yerington, Nevada
- Coordinates: 38.5366°N 119.0841°W
- Area: 49,018 acres (19,837 ha)
- Established: September 15, 2014
- Administrator: U.S. Forest Service

The Wovoka Wilderness is a wilderness area in Lyon County in the state of Nevada in the United States. Part of Humboldt–Toiyabe National Forest, Wovoka Wilderness was designated part of the National Wilderness Preservation System in December 2014. Totaling 49,018 acres (19,837 ha), it is the largest remaining tract of wilderness in Lyon County. Named after Wovoka, was Wovoka Wilderness' total acreage includes 23,000 acres (9,308 ha) that are protected from leasing and mining.

== Etymology ==
The Wovoka Wilderness was named after Wovoka, the spiritual leader of the Paiute people in the early 20th-century. Wovoka was born and lived in the area.

== History ==
Northern Paiute people resided in the area until the early 20th-century, including spiritual leader Wovoka, of which the wilderness is named after. He lived and worked in the area until his death in 1932. The vast pinyon-juniper woodlands serve as a large source for pine nuts for the Paiute. The wilderness includes a prehistoric village site with 20 house rings, tool making sites, petroglyphs, drive fences and spiritual sites for the Paiute.

In 1844, John C. Fremont camped along the East Walker River in what is now the Wovoka Wilderness.

Senators Harry Reid and Dean Heller proposed the protection of the area in exchange for a copper mine in the 2000s or 2010s. The legislation did not succeed. Congressman Steven Horsford introduced a similar bill in 2013. A hearing took place featuring local representatives. On January 28, 2014, the House Committee on Natural Resources approved the legislation which was added to a larger proposal to be presented to Congress, including combining the Pine Forest and Wovoka Wilderness. The bill passed the Senate on September 15, 2014.

== Geography ==
The wilderness is located in Humboldt–Toiyabe National Forest in Lyon County, Nevada and totals 49,018 acres (19,837 ha) of protected land. The wilderness includes the southern part of Pine Grove Hills, including Bald Mountain, 13 miles of the East Walker River in the Walker River State Recreation Area. The highest part of the wilderness is 9,407 feet at Bald Mountain summit and 5,200 feet at the East Walker River.

== Geology ==
A now closed copper mine is located in the wilderness.

== Flora and fauna ==
The wilderness comprises pinyon-juniper woodland and includes Williams combleaf, Bodie Hills cusickiella, Mono County phacelia, Jeffrey pine and Barneby's serpentweed. The East Walker River section is lined with willow trees.

Wovoka Wilderness is a habitat for the threatened Bi-State sage-grouse, which uses the area for mating and nesting. Other fauna includes Apache silverspot butterflies, bighorn sheep, Townsend's big-eared bat, mule deer, American black bear, Western small-footed bat, bobcat, cougar, and golden eagles. The wilderness serves as a migration route from the Great Basin to the Sweetwater Mountains and Sierra Nevada.

== Recreation ==
Wovoka Wilderness, like all protected wilderness areas in the United States, prohibits vehicles. Therefore, only transport must be by foot, water transport, or horse. There are no system trails. Activities include fly fishing, skiing, canoeing, kayaking, and bird watching.
