= Nevada State Route 208 =

State highway in Nevada, United States

State Route 208
- Topaz/Yerington Road
- State Route 208, highlighted in red

Route information
- Maintained by NDOT
- Length: 37.893 mi (60.983 km)
- Existed: 1976–present

Major junctions
- West end: US 395 near Topaz Lake
- East end: US 95 Alt. in Yerington

Location
- Country: United States
- State: Nevada

Highway system
- Nevada State Highway System; Interstate; US; State; Pre‑1976; Scenic
| ← SR 207 | → I-215 |

State Route 208 (SR 208) is a 37.893-mile (60.983 km) state highway in Douglas and Lyon counties in Nevada, United States. It connects U.S. Route 395 (US 395) north of Topaz Lake to U.S. Route 95 Alternate in Yerington. The road serves as the primary transportation corridor of Smith Valley and is Main street in Yerington. The route was originally a portion of State Route 3.

== Route description ==
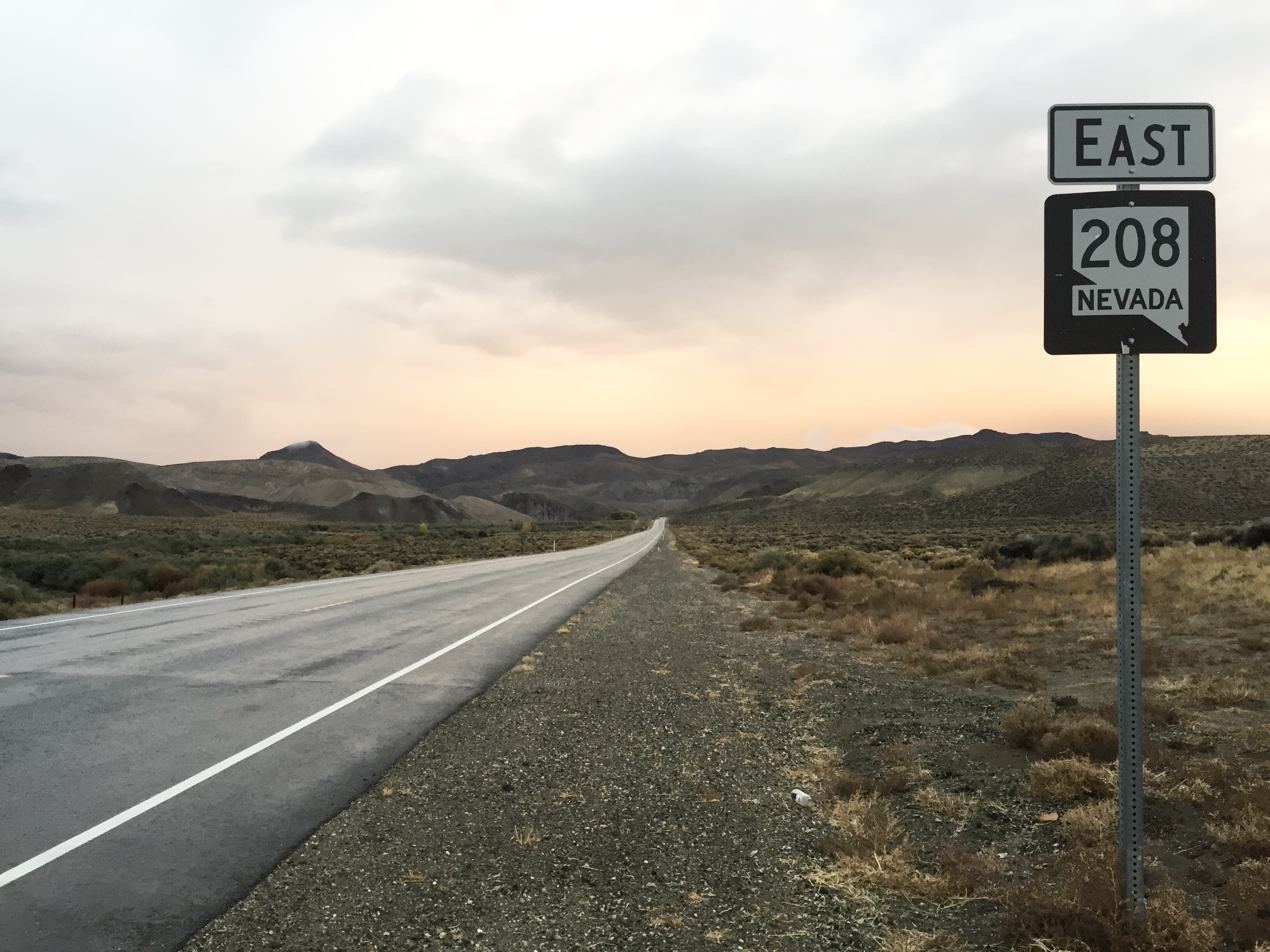
View eastbound along SR 208 in Lyon County

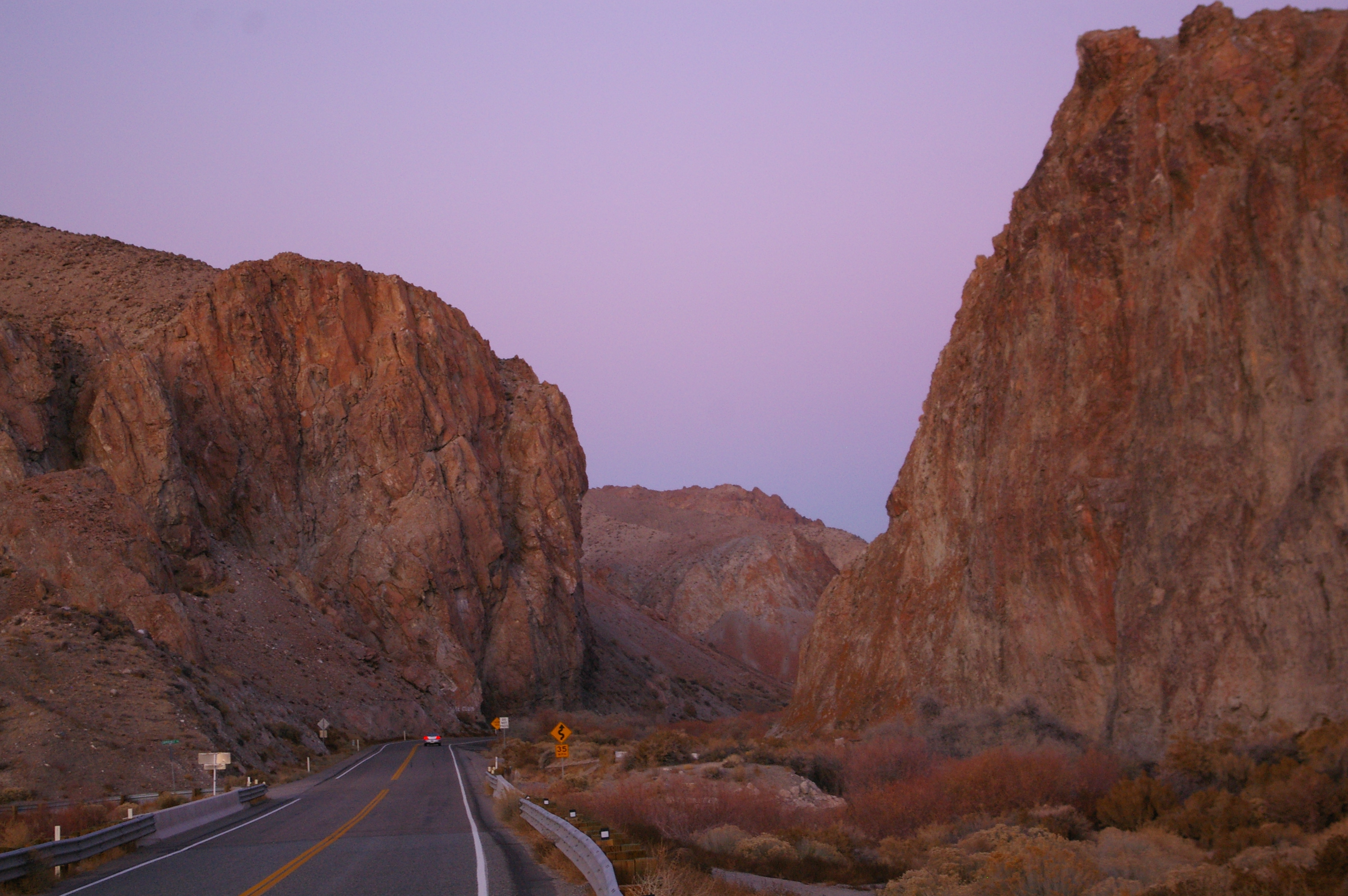
Route 208 following Wilson Canyon of the Walker River near Yerington

The character of the highway gradually changes descending from the foothills of the Sierra Nevada into high desert, finally reaching the agricultural communities of Smith and Mason Valleys. The highway begins at a junction with US 395 in the foothills of the Sierra Nevada, at the junction with Nevada highway 208, at the hamlet of Holbrook Junction.

The highway angles away from the Sierra into extreme northern Antelope Valley and through the unincorporated town of Topaz Ranch Estates before climbing several hundred feet over Jack Wright Summit (elevation 5842 MSL). It then makes a steep descent through a canyon created by the West Walker River, flattening out into Smith Valley at the town of Wellington. Once reaching the valley, the road more or less follows the route of the river from this point on. The highway departs Smith Valley via the river, using Wilson Canyon to connect with Mason Valley, another agricultural valley in the otherwise arid deserts of Nevada.

Inside Mason Valley the road forks, with route 208 serving the east side of the valley and route 339 serving the west. Shortly after the split is where the West and East Walker Rivers merge to form the Walker River. Both roads lead to Yerington, straddling each side of the river. In Yerington, Route 208 serves as Main Street. The route terminates at the north end of Yerington where traffic defaults onto southbound U.S. Route 95 Alternate.

== History ==
This is one of the oldest highways in Nevada. The route was first part of the lesser used Sonora Pass branch of the California Trail. The route appeared as a highway on maps since at least as far back as 1919. The highway was first numbered as a portion of State Route 3, a designation in use by 1929. The State Route 3 designation extended from Reno to the California state line in Fish Lake Valley west of Lida. This route is drivable today as U.S. Route 395 Alternate, State Route 529 and U.S. Route 395 to the modern terminus of Route 208. It extended past Yerington via what is now U.S. Route 95 Alternate, U.S. Route 95 and SR 266.

During the late 1970s and early 1980s the state of Nevada renumbered most state routes. The 1978 edition of the Nevada Highways map was the first to use both the 3 and 208 designations, with the 1982 edition the first to use only the 208 designation.

== Major intersections ==
Note: Mileposts in Nevada reset at county lines; the start and end mileposts for each county are given in the county column.

| County | Location | mi | km | Destinations | Notes |
|---|---|---|---|---|---|
| Douglas; 0.00–8.78 | Holbrook Junction | 0.00 | 0.00 | US 395 – Gardnerville, Topaz Lake | |
| Lyon; 0.00–29.10 | | 1 | 1.6 | SR 823 (Colony District Road) | |
| Lyon; 0.00–29.10 | Wellington | 2 | 3.2 | SR 829 to SR 338 – Bridgeport | |
| Lyon; 0.00–29.10 | Smith | | | SR 338 – Bridgeport | |
| Lyon; 0.00–29.10 | Smith | | | SR 824 (Day Lane) / SR 825 (Gage Road) | |
| Lyon; 0.00–29.10 | | | | SR 339 north – Mason, Yerington | |
| Lyon; 0.00–29.10 | | | | SR 827 – Mason | |
| Lyon; 0.00–29.10 | Yerington | | | SR 340 west (Bridge Street) | |
| Lyon; 0.00–29.10 | Yerington | 29.10 | 46.83 | US 95 Alt. – Silver Springs, Hawthorne | |
1.000 mi = 1.609 km; 1.000 km = 0.621 mi

== See also ==
- List of state highways in Nevada
