= Wilson Canyon =

Coordinates: 38°49′9.3″N 119°12′17.6″W

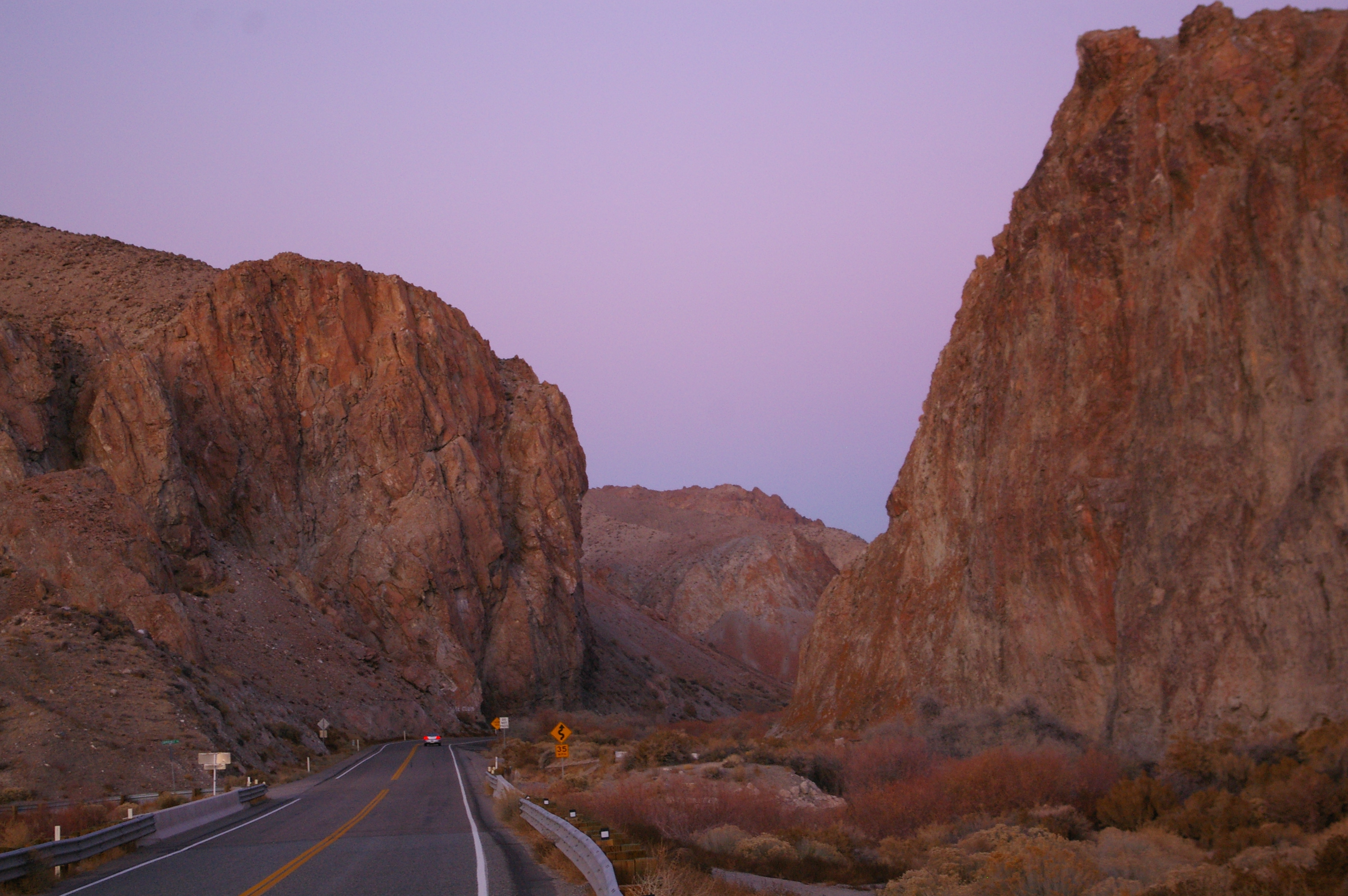
Route 208 following Wilson Canyon of the Walker River near Yerington

Wilson Canyon is a gorge cut by the Walker River through a series of volcanic cliffs. The canyon is located 13 miles (21 km) west of Yerington, along Nevada State Route 208. It is managed by the U.S. Bureau of Land Management.

== Description ==
The canyon runs through the Singatse Range in Lyon County, where the Walker River flows northeast into the Mason Valley. Over the two miles (3.2 km) of canyon the elevation of the Walker River drops by 120 feet (37 m), or an average grade of 1% (compared to 0.1% to the west of the canyon). The canyon was named after "Uncle Billy Wilson" who was a miner and rancher, and for whom the Wilson Mining District is also named. The Nevada Copper Belt Railroad ran through Wilson Canyon; the track laid to the canyon was completed shortly before Uncle Billy Wilson's death.

== Flooding ==
What were known as the "1997 New Year's Floods" occurred in western Nevada and northern California. They were the result of a group of snow storms in the Sierra Nevada at the end of 1996. Three additional rainstorms came between December 20, 1996. and January 2, 1997. These heavy rainstorms melted most of the snowpack below 7,000 feet (2,100 m) elevation, including that at the headwater of the Walker River. This, plus additional heavy rain between 7,000–10,000 feet (2,100–3,000 m), increased the amount of runoff from the mountains, with the consequence being the worst flood western Nevada had seen in 150 years. During this period Wilson Canyon flooded, the narrow width of the canyon increasing the amount of damage to the area. Large portions of Route 208 were destroyed, with pieces of roadway being found in the river after the flood subsided. Following the flood the highway was closed for two months and repaired at a cost of $726,000.
