= Nevada State Route 829 =

Highway in Nevada

State Route 829
- Wellington Cutoff
- SR 829 highlighted in red

Route information
- Maintained by NDOT
- Length: 3.167 mi (5.097 km)
- Existed: 1976–present

Major junctions
- South end: SR 338
- North end: SR 208 in Wellington

Location
- Country: United States
- State: Nevada

Highway system
- Nevada State Highway System; Interstate; US; State; Pre‑1976; Scenic
← SR 828	→ SR 839

State Route 829 (SR 829) is a state highway in Lyon County, Nevada. Also known as Wellington Road, the route serves as a shortcut connecting State Route 338 to State Route 208 near Wellington.

== History ==
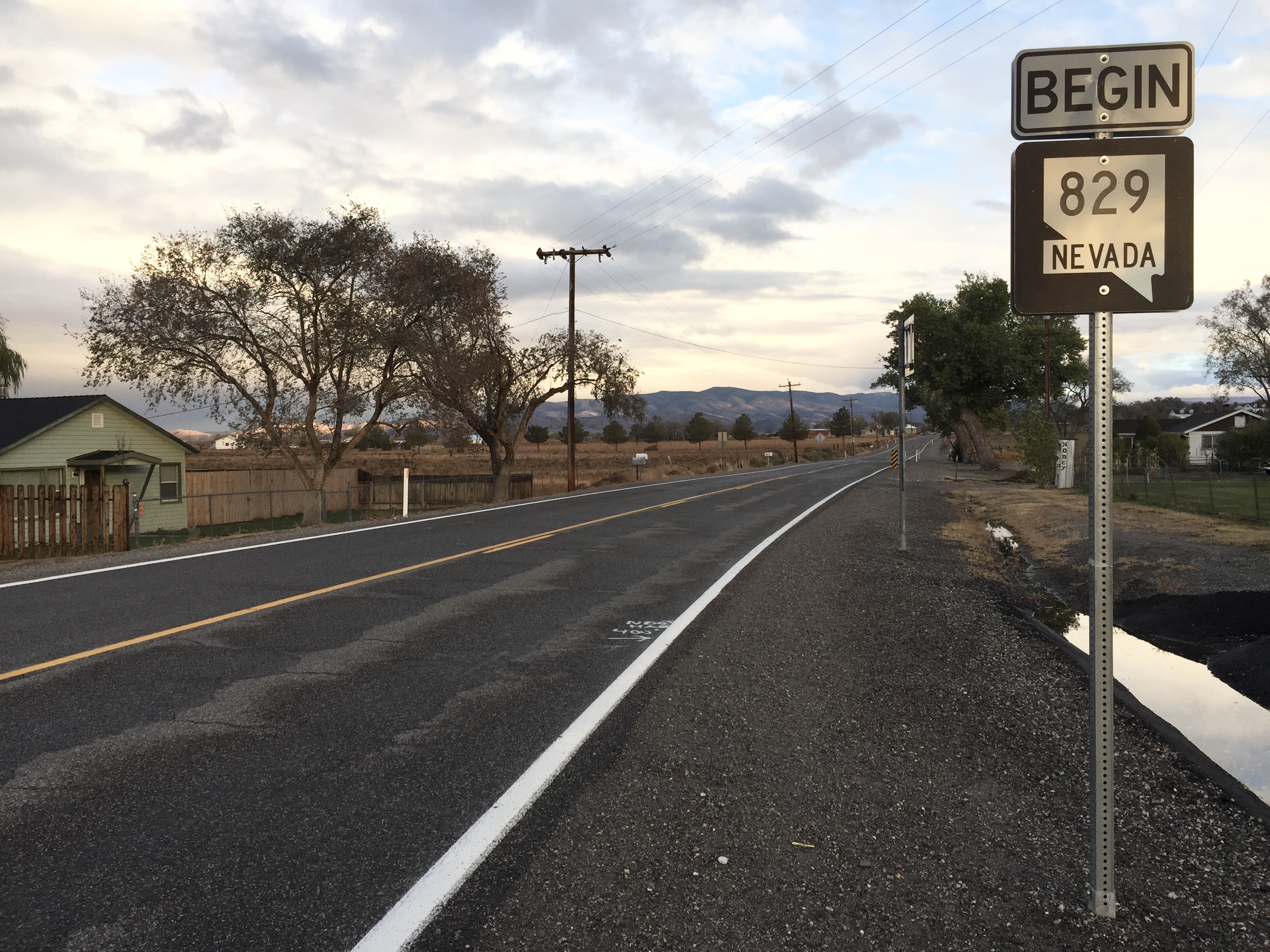
View at the north end of SR 829 looking south

Wellington Road was established as an unimproved roadway as early as 1917 and, by 1929, had been made part of State Route 22, a longer route through the Smith Valley connecting Wellington to Bridgeport, California. The Wellington Road portion of SR 22 was reassigned to State Route 829 in Nevada's state highway renumbering in the late 1970s, with the remainder of the old route becoming State Route 338.

== Major intersections ==
The entire route is in Lyon County.

Location	mi	km	Destinations	Notes
	0.000	0.000	SR 338 – Yerington, Bridgeport	
Wellington	3.167	5.097	SR 208 – Gardnerville, Yerington	
1.000 mi = 1.609 km; 1.000 km = 0.621 mi
