= Nevada State Route 827 =

State highway in Nevada, United States

State Route 827
- Mason Road, Cremetti Lane, MacKenzie Lane, Pursel Lane
- SR 827 highlighted in red

Route information
- Maintained by NDOT
- Length: 5.791 mi (9.320 km)

Major junctions
- West end: SR 339
- SR 208
- East end: Lyon County

Location
- Country: United States
- State: Nevada
- County: Lyon

Highway system
- Nevada State Highway System; Interstate; US; State; Pre‑1976; Scenic
← SR 824	→ SR 828

State Route 827 (SR 827) is a state highway in Lyon County, Nevada. The road starts at SR 339 and heads east as Mason Road. It continues east across SR 208 and is renamed West Cremetti Lane, then turns south as MacKenzie Lane, and then turns east again onto East Pursel Lane. The highway then turns into a gravel county road.

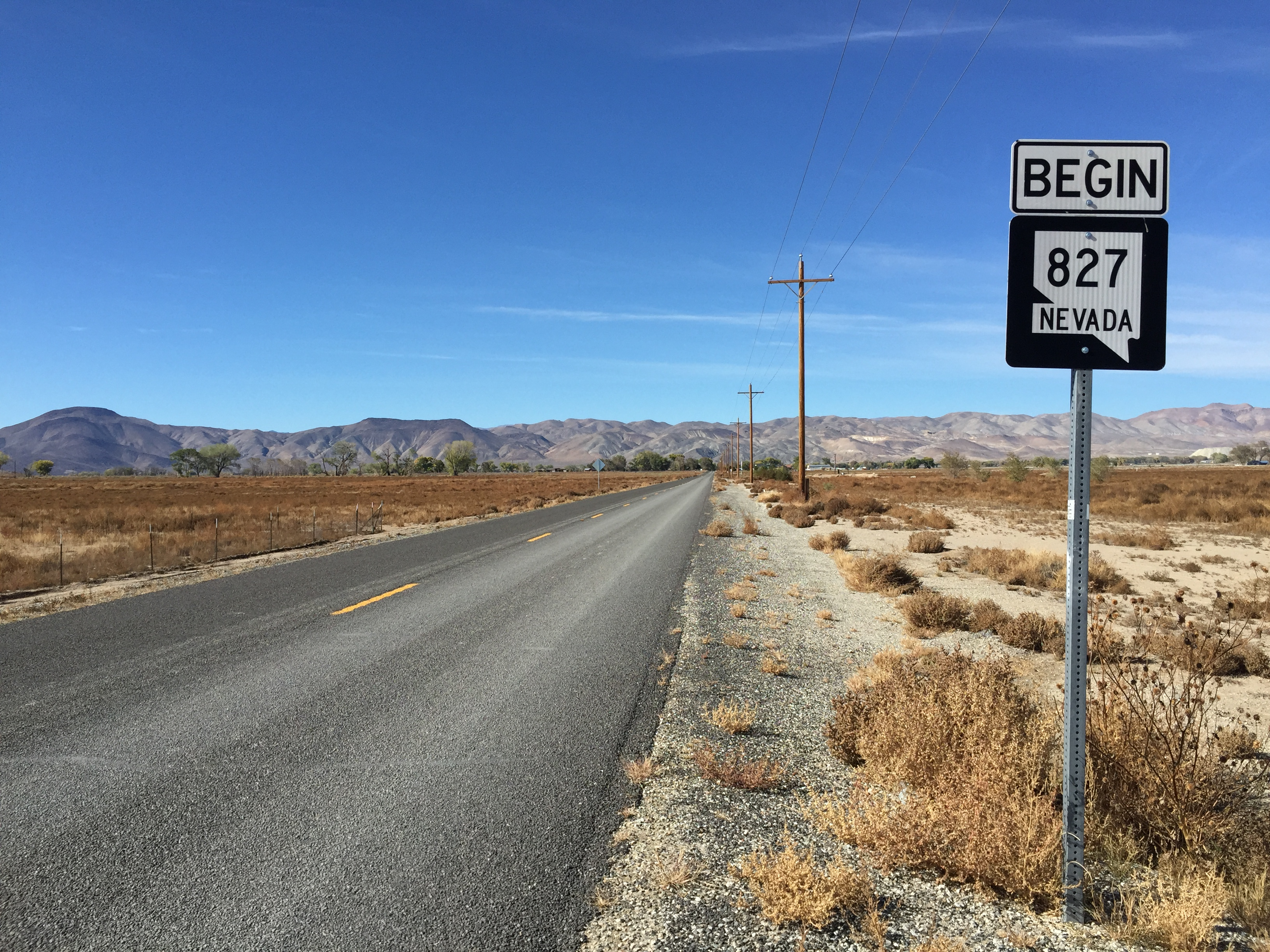
View at the east end of SR 827 looking westbound

== Major intersections ==
The entire route is in Lyon County.

Location	mi	km	Destinations	Notes
Mason	0.0	0.0	SR 339	Western terminus
	1.5	2.4	SR 208	
	5.8	9.3	Pursel Lane	
1.000 mi = 1.609 km; 1.000 km = 0.621 mi
