= Nevada State Route 340 =

State highway in Nevada, United States

State Route 340
- Bridge Street
- SR 340 highlighted in red

Route information
- Maintained by NDOT
- Length: 1.080 mi (1.738 km)
- Existed: 1976–present

Major junctions
- West end: SR 339 near Yerington
- East end: SR 208 in Yerington

Location
- Country: United States
- State: Nevada

Highway system
- Nevada State Highway System; Interstate; US; State; Pre‑1976; Scenic
← SR 339	→ SR 341

State Route 340 (SR 340) is a short state highway in Lyon County, Nevada. The route covers a portion of Bridge Street in the city of Yerington.

== Route description ==
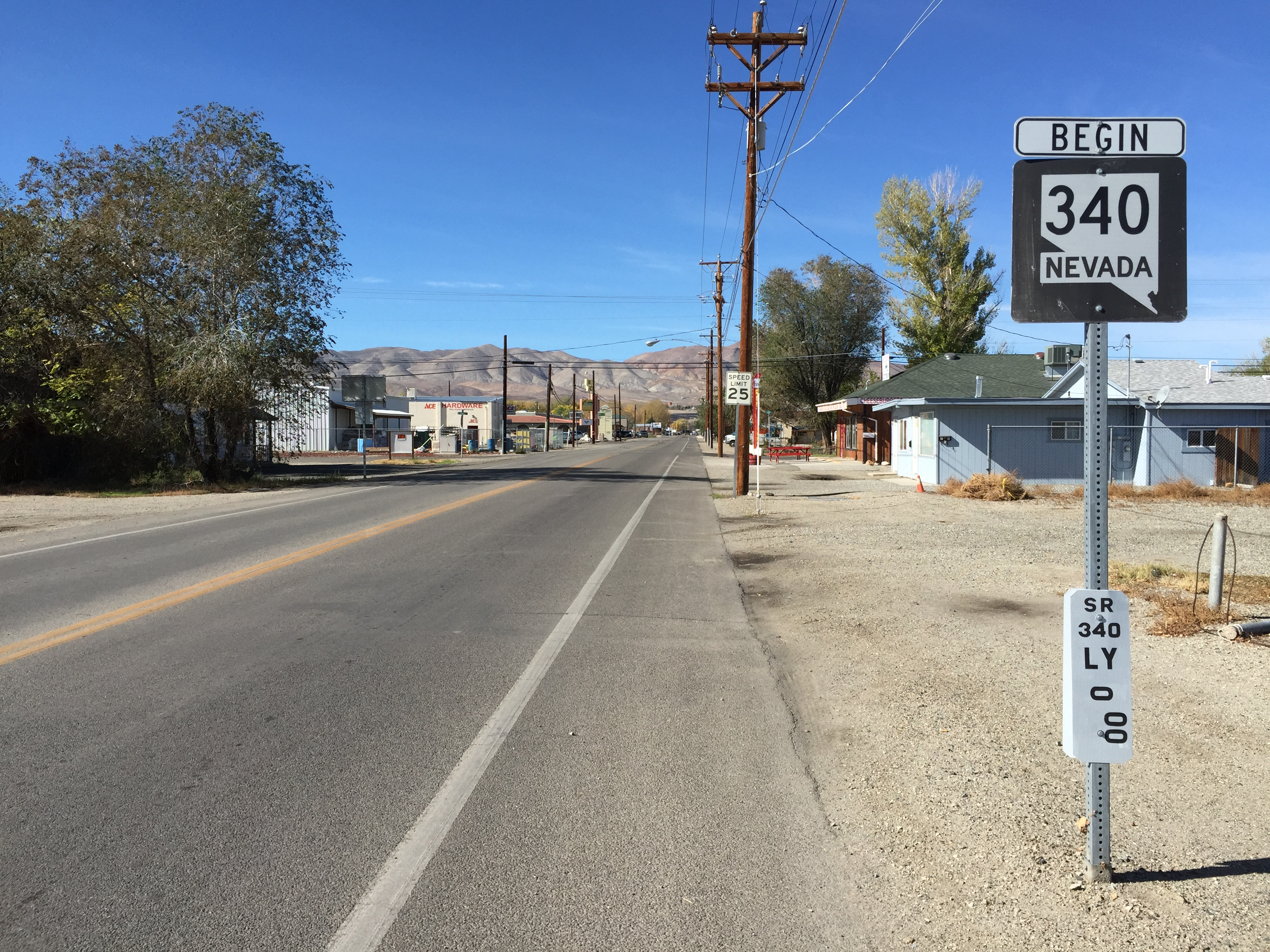
View from the east end of SR 340 looking westbound

SR 340 begins at the intersection of Bridge Street and State Route 339 just west of the city limits and east of Yerington Mine. From there, the highway heads east on Bridge Street, immediately crossing over the Walker River. The route passes through farm areas and just north of the Yerington Paiute Indian Colony as it heads into more populated areas of the city. SR 340 travels a little over 1 mile (1.6 km) on Bridge Street before the designation ends at the junction of Main Street (State Route 208).

== History ==
State Route 340 was established on July 1, 1976.

== Major intersections ==
The entire route is in Lyon County.

Location	mi	km	Destinations	Notes
	0.00	0.00	SR 339 – Smith	
Yerington	1.08	1.74	SR 208 – Smith, Schurz	
1.000 mi = 1.609 km; 1.000 km = 0.621 mi
