= Lyon County Courthouse (Nevada) =

- U.S. National Register of Historic Places
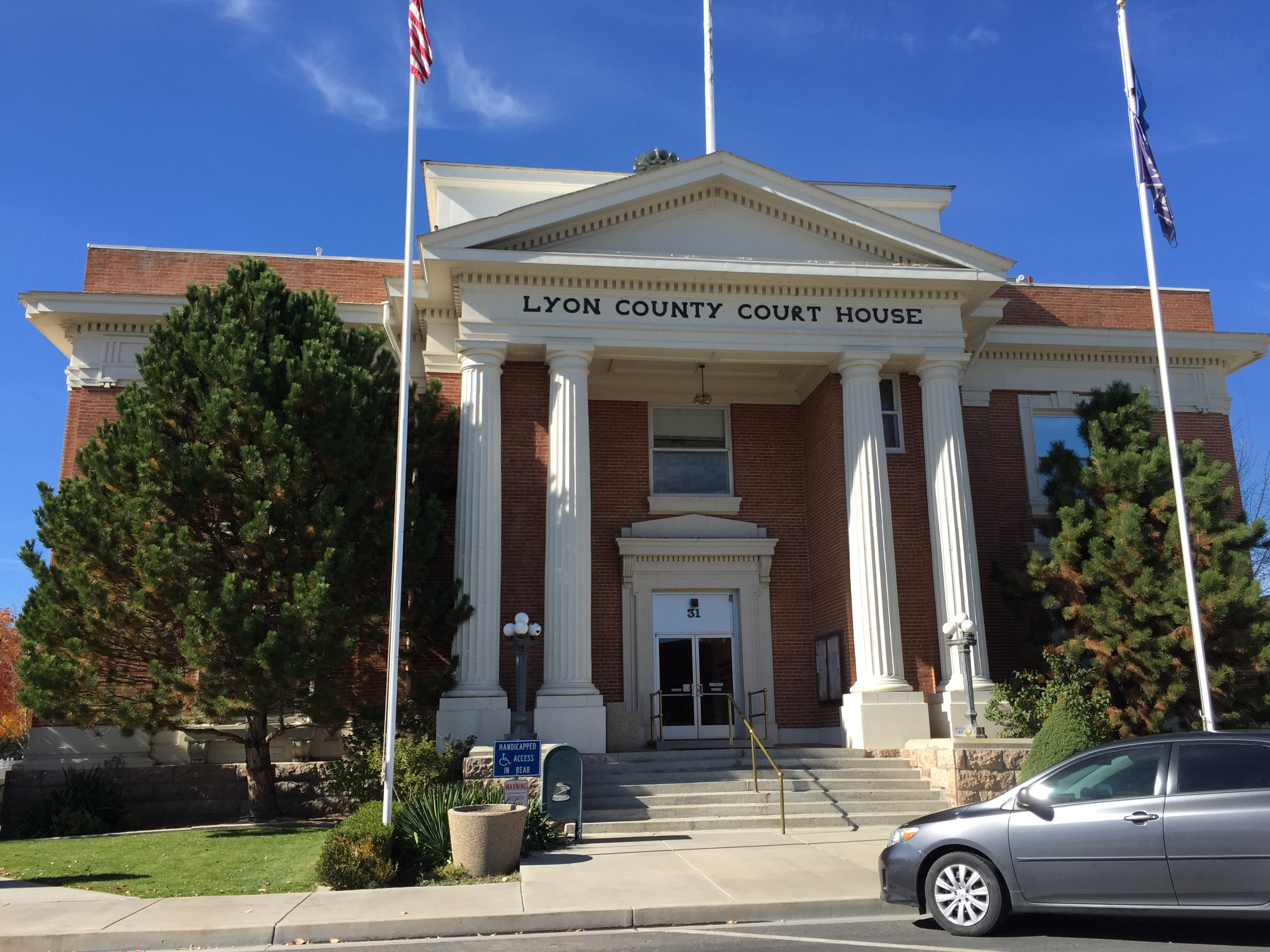
- Lyon County Courthouse

- Location within Nevada Location within the United States
- Interactive map showing the location of Lyon County Courthouse
- Location: 31 S. Main St., Yerington, Nevada
- Coordinates: 38°59′11″N 119°9′46″W
- Area: 1.3 acres (0.53 ha)
- Built: 1911-12; 1936
- Built by: Ward Bros. & Calder
- Architect: F.J. DeLongchamps
- Architectural style: Beaux Arts
- NRHP reference No.: 83001112
- Added to NRHP: March 24, 1983

The Lyon County Courthouse in Yerington, Nevada is a courthouse which is listed in the National Register of Historic Places. It currently serves as a courthouse for Lyon County, Nevada.

It was designed by Nevada architect Frederick DeLongchamps in Beaux Arts style and was built during 1911–12. It was extended in 1936.

== Description ==
The courthouse was erected before World War I, it is situated in a park-like setting. It reserves richness in uprightness. The building is placed on about 1.4 acres of property which is County owned. The building faces Yerington's main street which orientates it towards the east. Its neighboring area has residential buildings and commercial buildings as well.

For US$35,000, the Reno contractor Ward Bros. & Calder constructed the courthouse. The establishment is 3-story and its structural measurement is ninety feet by eighty feet. It has an office space of 18,000 square feet. The courthouse is structurally the most high-rise concrete and brick building of Yerington.

A brick wall runs constantly from the base to the top of the structure that creates a parapet wall above the ornamental eave line. The sign of Terra-cotta is visible on the building's columns, window, and door.

== History ==
At a cost of forty thousand USD, the west half of the courthouse was added in 1936. The establishment housed several offices and personnel associated with both County and State governments since 1912.

== Significance ==
The courthouse is an example of sophisticated Beaux-Arts-inspired architecture. Frederick J. DeLongchamps practiced the style throughout the State. It is believed that it is allowed under criteria C. The Lyon County Courthouse is important to Yerington city and Lyon County as a sign of resolving a disputation between the northern and southern parts of the county for the privilege of housing the county seat.

Regarding the placement of the county seat, disputation often arose in large Nevada counties with sparse populations and few big cities. The reason behind this quarrel was the result often guaranteed the survival and growth of the defeater, while the losers’ prospects were remarkably reduced. Close to the dwindling Comstock Lode, Dayton was the Lyon Country’s seat in 1910. The combination of that economic decline and a fire that wrecked the functioning courthouse caused the contest for the seat by the natives of Yerington, located to the south. Lyon County Courthouse was built the next year in Yerington. The deciding factor was the expansion of mining in Mason Valley.
