= Nevada State Route 824 =

Highway in Nevada

State Route 824
- Day Lane
- SR 824 highlighted in red

Route information
- Maintained by NDOT
- Length: 5.560 mi (8.948 km)

Major junctions
- South end: SR 208 in Smith
- North end: SR 823 in Smith Valley

Location
- Country: United States
- State: Nevada
- County: Lyon

Highway system
- Nevada State Highway System; Interstate; US; State; Pre‑1976; Scenic
| ← SR 823 | → SR 827 |

State Route 824 (SR 824) is a state highway in Lyon County, Nevada, United States. It runs from State Route 208 (Topaz–Yerington Road) near Smith north and west to State Route 823 (Lower Colony Road).

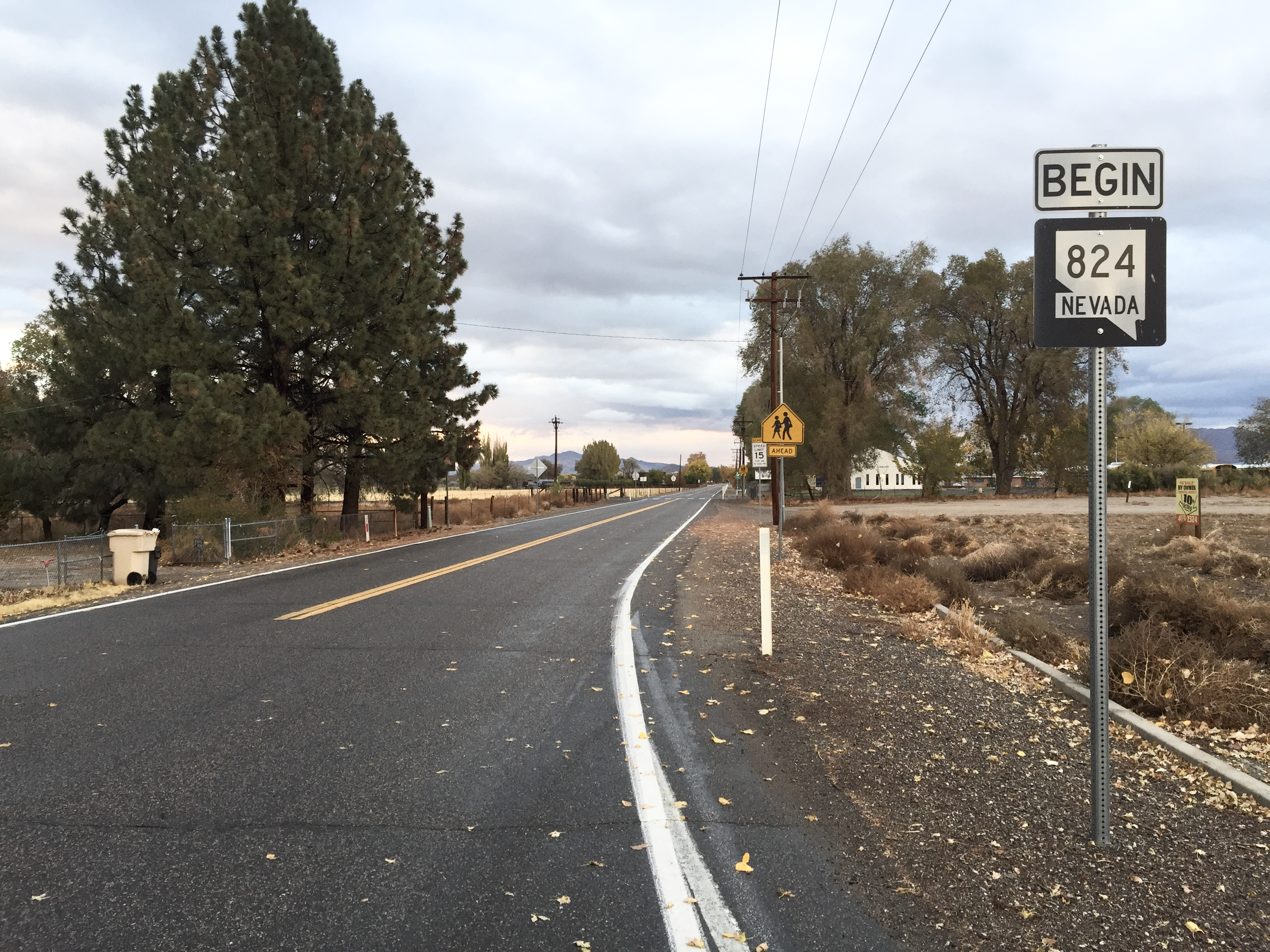
View at the south end of SR 824 looking northbound

== Major intersections ==
The entire route is in Lyon County.

| Location | mi | km | Destinations | Notes |
|---|---|---|---|---|
| Smith Valley | 0.000 | 0.000 | SR 823 | Northern terminus |
| Smith | 5.560 | 8.948 | SR 208 | Southern terminus |
1.000 mi = 1.609 km; 1.000 km = 0.621 mi
