= Nevada State Route 823 =

State highway in Nevada, United States

State Route 823
- Lower Colony Road, Artesia Road
- SR 823 highlighted in red

Route information
- Maintained by NDOT
- Length: 7.618 mi (12.260 km)

Major junctions
- South end: SR 208 near Wellington
- SR 824
- North end: Upper Colony Road in Simpson

Location
- Country: United States
- State: Nevada
- County: Lyon

Highway system
- Nevada State Highway System; Interstate; US; State; Pre‑1976; Scenic
| ← SR 806 | → SR 824 |

State Route 823 (SR 823) is a 7.614-mile-long (12.254 km) state highway in Lyon County, Nevada, United States. The road runs from State Route 208 near Wellington north to Simpson.

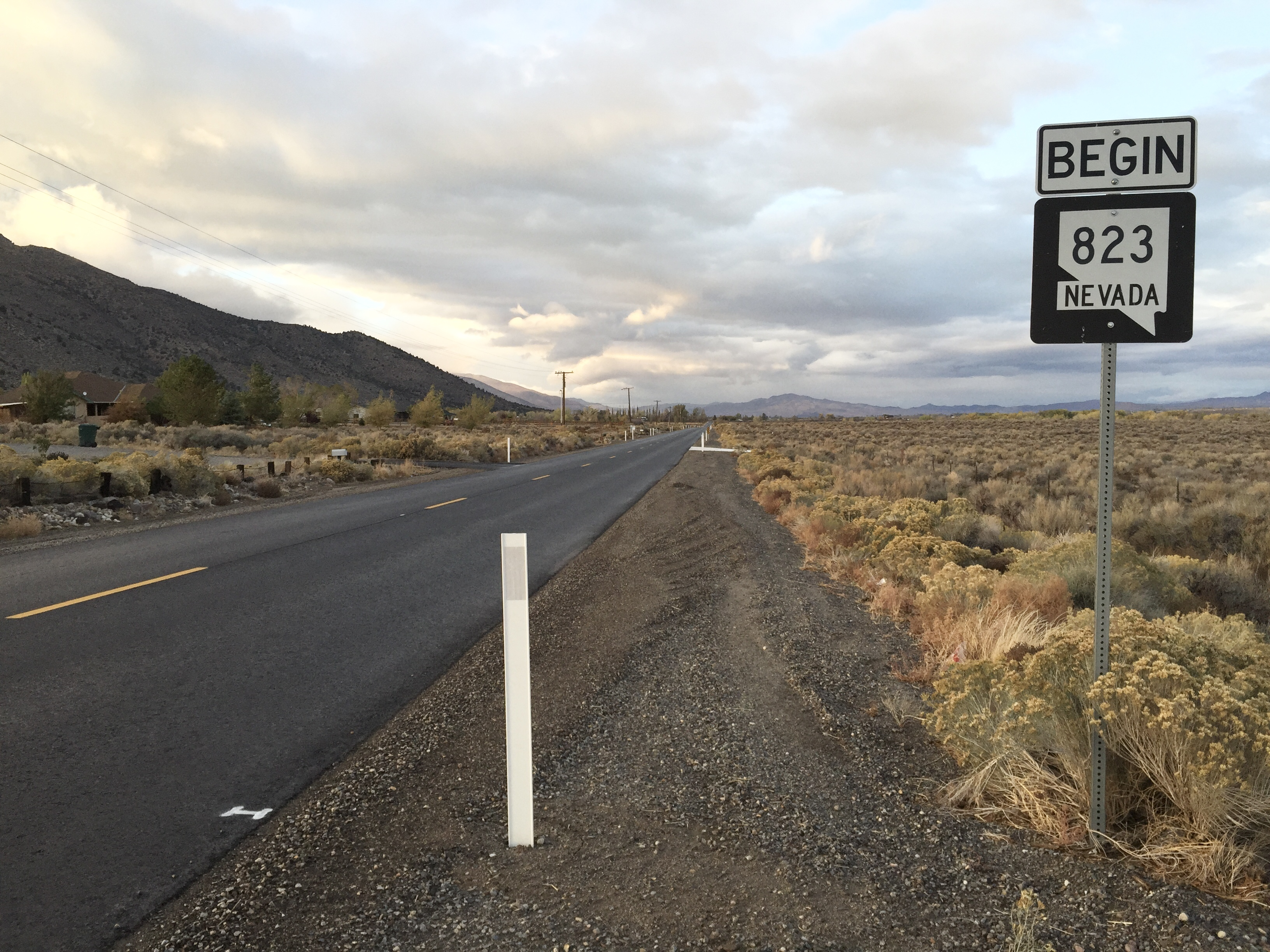
View at the south end of SR 823 looking northbound

== Major intersections ==
The entire route is in Lyon County.

| Location | mi | km | Destinations | Notes |
|---|---|---|---|---|
| Wellington | 0.0 | 0.0 | SR 208 | |
| | 5.1 | 8.2 | SR 824 | |
| | 7.6 | 12.2 | Upper Colony Road | End state maintenance |
1.000 mi = 1.609 km; 1.000 km = 0.621 mi
