= Nevada State Route 3 =

Former state highway in Nevada, United States

State Route 3

Route information
- Maintained by NDOT
- Length: 336.2 mi (541.1 km) (1929 length)
- Existed: 1929–1978

Major junctions
- South end: California state line, 4 miles east of Oasis, CA (1929)
- North end: Reno (1929-1939); US 395 at Holbrook Jct (1939-1978)

Location
- Country: United States
- State: Nevada

Highway system
- Nevada State Highway System; Interstate; US; State; Pre‑1976; Scenic

State Route 3 was the original designation for SR 208, SR 266 and SR 429. It was also the original designation for sections of US 6, US 50, US 95, Alternate US 95, US 395, and SR 430.

SR 3 was one of Nevada’s original state highways, first appearing on official state highway maps in the late 1920s. Originally called the “Bonanza Highway”, it ran 336.2 miles (541.1 km) from Reno to the California state line west of Lida. Soon after being commissioned, SR 3 started going through changes, becoming shorter and less important as a major highway in the process.

== Route description ==
SR 3 began at the California state line west of Lida and took a circuitous route to Carson City and Reno. The route ran as follows:

- California state line 4 miles (6.4 km) east of Oasis, CA east on present day SR 266 to SR 5 (now US 95), 41 miles (66 km) south of Tonopah
- North on present-day US 95 through Goldfield, Tonopah, Coaldale, Mina and Hawthorne to Schurz
- West on present-day Alternate US 95 to Yerington
- South and west on present-day SR 208 to the junction of US 395 at Holbrook Junction
- North on US 395 through Gardnerville and Minden to Carson City
- Route 3 forked at Carson City, with one branch following modern US 50 to Lake Tahoe and the other branch along US 395 terminating at Reno, Nevada with then State Route 1

== History ==
Dates are based on when changes appear on official Nevada state highway maps unless otherwise noted.

SR 3 first appears on official state highway maps in the late 1920s. By the mid-1930s, it was undergoing changes that would shrink it and eventually divide it into two separate highways.

In 1935, US 395 was extended into Nevada and routed concurrently with SR 3 from Reno to Holbrook Junction. In 1937, US 6 was extended into Nevada and routed concurrently with SR 3 between Tonopah and Coaldale. By 1941, the northern terminus of SR 3 was truncated to the junction with US 395 at present-day Holbrook Junction, eliminating the duplication of route numbers between there and Reno.

A major change occurred in 1940. US 95 was extended into Nevada and replaced SR 3 from the junction with SR 5 south of Goldfield north to Schurz. SR 3 was now a discontinuous highway. The northern section ran from Schurz to Minden. The southern section ran from south of Goldfield to the California state line via Lida. Another major change occurred in 1941 when Alternate US 95 (initially mislabeled on state maps as US 95) replaced the section of SR 3 from Schurz to Yerington.

From 1941, SR 3 remained largely unchanged until 1978 when it was replaced in a statewide highway renumbering project. The northern section from Minden to Yerington was renumbered as SR 208. The southern section from US 95 to the California state line was renumbered as SR 266.
