= Dini's Lucky Club =

Casino in Nevada, United States

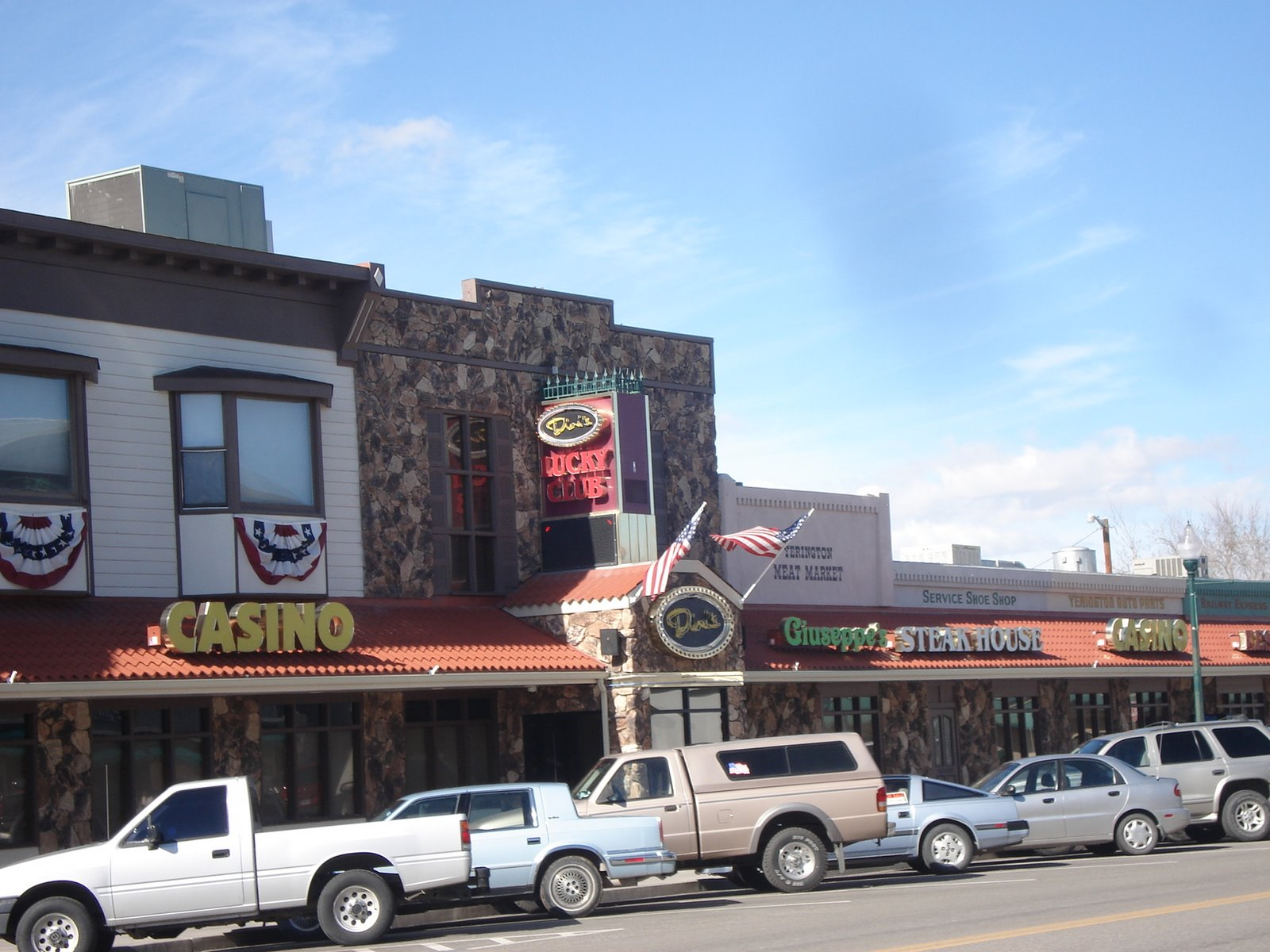
- Interactive map of Dini's Lucky Club
- Location: Yerington, Nevada, U.S.; 45 Main Street; 38.98844°N 119.16357°W
- Opened: 1933; 93 years ago
- Theme: Old West
- Gaming space: 3,200 sq ft (300 m^{2})
- Owner: Dini Family
- Website: Official website

Dini's Lucky Club is a casino located in Yerington, Nevada which claims to be the "oldest family owned casino in Nevada" (since 1933).

== History ==
Dini's was founded in downtown Yerington in 1933 as the Wooden Shoe Club by Giuseppe "Joe" Dini, Sr.. In 1938, it moved and was renamed "Joe Dini's lucky club". In 1960, the business was purchased by Joe Dini, Jr., Giuseppe's son, who later became the longest serving member in Nevada State Assembly history. Following a series of expansions and acquisitions of buildings adjacent to the existing property, Dini's has expanded to include a main casino, restaurant and bar & lounge. Dini's is now owned by Joe Jr.'s two sons, George and Jay.
