= Uncle Billy =

Uncle Billy may refer to:

== People with the nickname ==
- William Hicks (born 1817), 19th century emigrant to California and landowner
- William K. Martin (1867–1949), American football and baseball coach
- William Thomas Hamilton (frontiersman) (1822–1908)
- William Tecumseh Sherman (1820–1891), American Civil War general
- William H. Spurgeon (1829-1915), founder of Santa Ana, California
- William Carlos Stone (1859–1939), American philatelist
- William Barton, 19th century founder of Barton Springs Pool in Austin, Texas
- Uncle Billy Wilson, 19th century American miner and rancher

== Fictional characters ==
- Uncle Billy in the 1911 American silent film Billy the Kid
- Uncle Billy in the 1916 American silent film Pidgin Island
- Uncle Billy in the 1935 American dramatic film The Littlest Rebel
- Uncle Billy, in the 1946 American Christmas film It's a Wonderful Life
- Uncle Billy in the 1961 American Western film Posse from Hell
- Uncle Billy in the 1990 film Slumber Party Massacre III
- Uncle Billy in the 2007 film Turquoise Rose
- Uncle Billy Burly in the 1936 American drama film Career Woman
- Uncle Billy Cleaver in the 1950s/60s TV series Leave It to Beaver
- Uncle Billy Possum in the 1970s anime TV series Fables of the Green Forest
- Uncle Billy in the 1994 novel At Home in Mitford
- Uncle Baby Billy in the television series The Righteous Gemstones

== See also ==
- Uncle Willy (disambiguation)
