= Nevada State Route 339 =

Highway in Nevada

State Route 339
- Nordyke Road
- SR 339 highlighted in red

Route information
- Maintained by NDOT
- Length: 11.523 mi (18.544 km)
- Existed: December 31, 1991–present

Major junctions
- South end: SR 208 east of Wilson Canyon
- North end: US 95 Alt. in Yerington

Location
- Country: United States
- State: Nevada
- County: Lyon

Highway system
- Nevada State Highway System; Interstate; US; State; Pre‑1976; Scenic
← SR 338	→ SR 340

State Route 339 (SR 339) is a 11.523-mile-long (18.544 km) state highway in Lyon County, Nevada, United States. It starts at State Route 208 east of Wilson Canyon and it parallels that route to the west north to U.S. 95 Alternate (Goldfield Avenue) in Yerington.

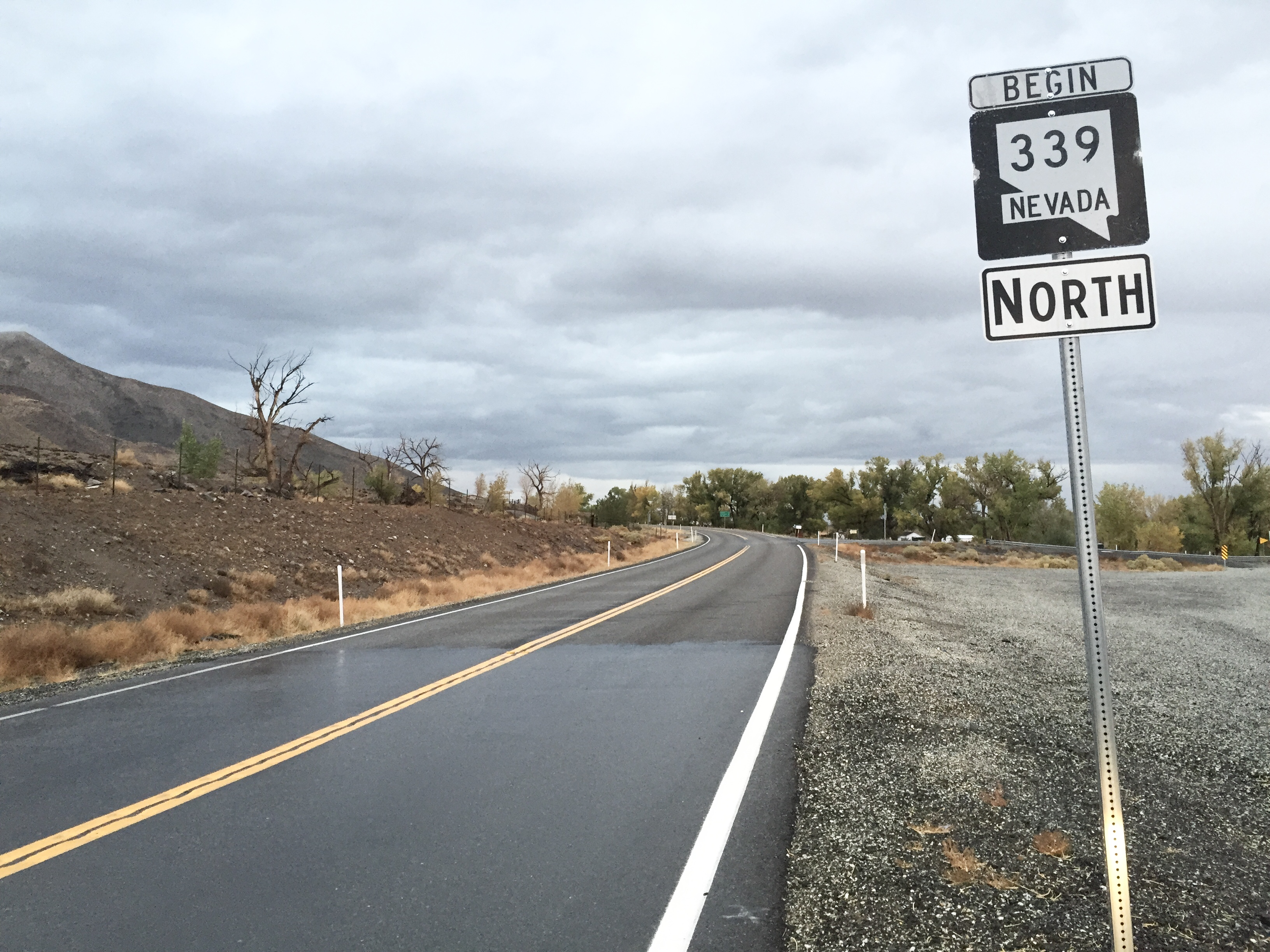
View from the south end of SR 339 looking northbound

== Major intersections ==
The entire route is in Lyon County.

Location	mi	km	Destinations	Notes
	0.000	0.000	SR 208 – Yerington	Southern terminus
Yerington	10.77	17.33	SR 340 east	
Yerington	11.523	18.544	US 95 Alt. – Schurz, Fernley	Northern terminus
1.000 mi = 1.609 km; 1.000 km = 0.621 mi
