= Smith Valley, Nevada =

- Census-designated place
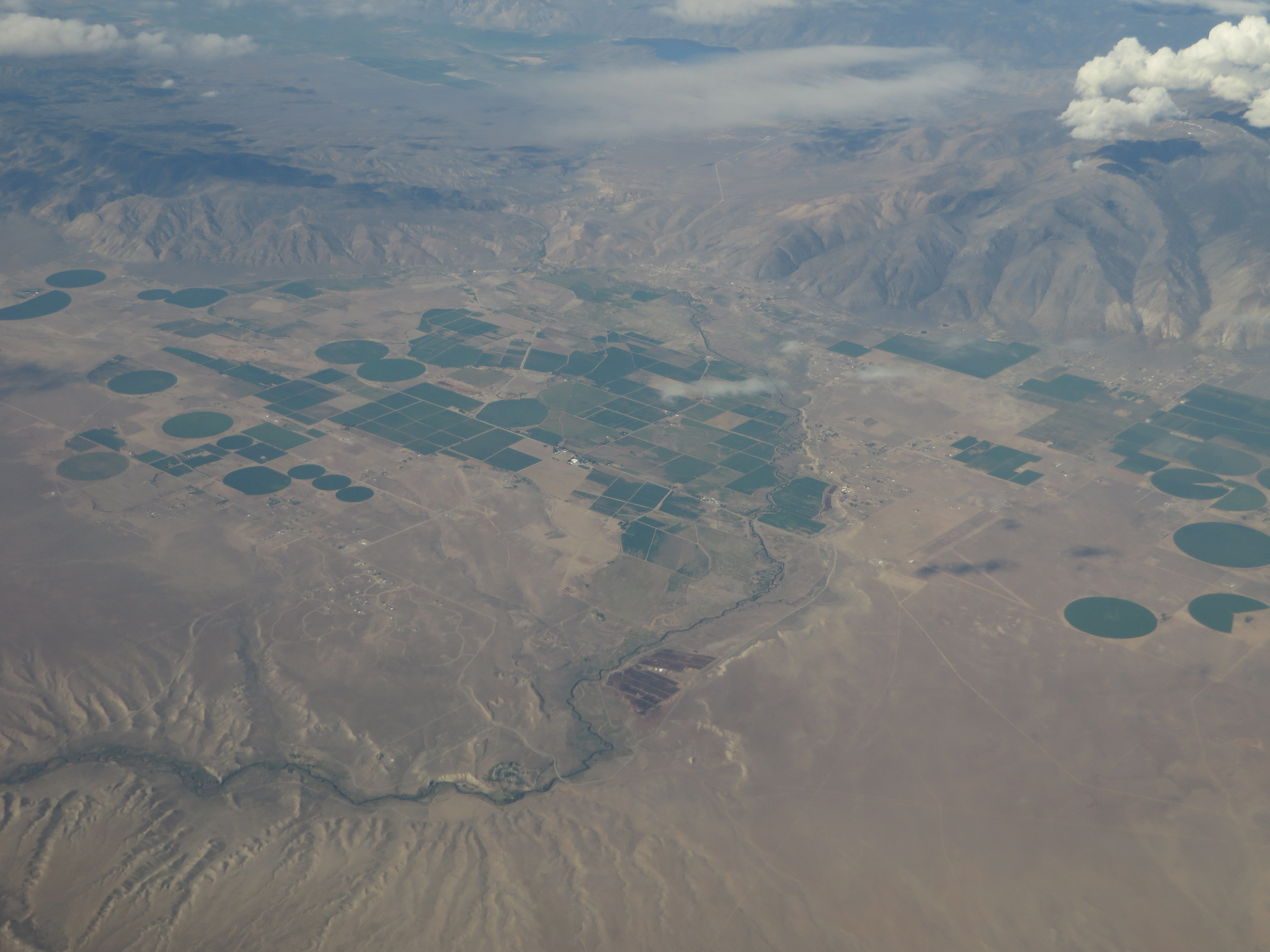
- Aerial view of Smith Valley

- Location of Smith Valley, Nevada
- Coordinates: 38°49′9″N 119°21′21″W
- Country: United States
- State: Nevada
- County: Lyon

Area
  - Total: 103.88 sq mi (269.06 km^{2})
  - Land: 101.96 sq mi (264.07 km^{2})
  - Water: 1.92 sq mi (4.98 km^{2})
- Elevation: 4,731 ft (1,442 m)

Population (2020)
  - Total: 1,710
  - Density: 16.8/sq mi (6.48/km^{2})
- Time zone: UTC-8 (Pacific (PST))
  - Summer (DST): UTC-7 (PDT)
- FIPS code: 32-68050
- GNIS feature ID: 2408748

Smith Valley is a census-designated place (CDP) in Lyon County, Nevada, United States. As of the 2020 census, Smith Valley had a population of 1,710.

== Geography and name ==
Smith Valley is located in southwestern Lyon County at 38°49′9″N 119°21′21″W (38.819204, -119.355912), occupying the valley of the same name. The valley is bordered to the west by the Pine Nut Mountains, to the north by the Buckskin Range, to the east by the Singatse Range, to the southwest by the Wellington Hills, and to the southeast by the Pine Grove Hills. The CDP occupies the western and central parts of the valley, with the western border of the CDP following the Douglas County line.

Nevada State Route 208 passes through the valley, leading northeast 23 miles (37 km) to Yerington, the Lyon county seat, and west 15 miles (24 km) to U.S. Route 395 north of Topaz Lake. State Route 338 leads south from Smith Valley 30 miles (48 km) to the California border, where State Route 182 leads an additional 14 miles (23 km) to Bridgeport, California.

According to the United States Census Bureau, the Smith Valley CDP has a total area of 122.5 square miles (317.4 km^{2}), of which 120.6 square miles (312.4 km^{2}) are land and 1.9 square miles (5.0 km^{2}), or 1.57%, are water. The central part of the valley is drained by the West Walker River, which exits the valley to the east through Wilson Canyon. The northern part of the valley is an endorheic basin, with Artesia Lake occupying the lowest area.

Smith Valley is named for American fur trapper and explorer Jedediah Smith, who crossed the area in spring 1827, after crossing the Sierra Nevada at Ebbetts Pass on his way to the 1827 fur trade rendezvous.

== Demographics ==
Historical population
| Census | Pop. | Note | %± |
|---|---|---|---|
| 2020 | 1,710 | | — |
U.S. Decennial Census

As of the census of 2000, there were 1,422 people, 553 households, and 419 families residing in the CDP. The population density was 11.8 people per square mile (4.6/km^{2}). There were 610 housing units at an average density of 5.1 per square mile (2.05/km^{2}). The racial makeup of the CDP was 89.23% White, 0.27% African American, 1.20% Native American, 0.28% Asian, 0.07% Pacific Islander, 8.01% from other races, and 1.96% from two or more races. Hispanic or Latino of any race were 19.37% of the population.

There were 553 households, out of which 35.5% had children under the age of 17 living with them, 69.2% were married couples living together, 3.3% had a female householder with no husband present, and 24.1% were non-families. 19.0% of all households were made up of individuals, and 6.9% had someone living alone who was 65 years of age or older. The average household size was 2.56 and the average family size was 2.92.

In the CDP, the population was spread out, with 24.1% under the age of 18, 4.6% from 18 to 24, 24.2% from 25 to 44, 31.6% from 45 to 64, and 15.6% who were 65 years of age or older. The median age was 43 years. For every 100 females, there were 103.6 males. For every 100 females age 18 and over, there were 104.2 males.

The median income for a household in the CDP was $46,803, and the median income for a family was $46,625. Males had a median income of $31,574 versus $29,038 for females. The per capita income for the CDP was $21,940. About 8.4% of families and 12.3% of the population were below the poverty line, including 13.2% of those under age 18 and none of those age 65 or over.

Wovoka, also known as Jack Wilson, a Northern Paiute religious leader who founded the Ghost Dance movement of 1890, was born and raised in Smith Valley.

== Water use and shortages ==
The West Walker River flows through Smith Valley, and for more than a century the flows of the Walker have been diverted to irrigate farms and ranches. Diversions of the Walker River have contributed to near complete ecosystem collapse of Walker Lake. The primary crops grown in Smith Valley are alfalfa and hay.

In addition to the use of surface water that has led to the ecological collapse of Walker Lake, Smith Valley water users have withdrawn groundwater at an unsustainable rate for at least 50 years. In 2015, the Nevada Department of Water Resources issues Order 1267, limiting the use of supplemental groundwater in Smith and Mason Valleys. The order was subsequently struck down by state district court, as the order's 50% curtailment of all supplemental groundwater rights was found to abridge the priority dates of some supplemental groundwater right owners. In 2022, a study by the Nevada Department of Water Resources indicated that the groundwater table in Smith Valley has declined by more than 100 feet (30 m) in the last 50 years and that more than 287,000 acre-feet (354,000,000 m^{3}) of groundwater have been withdrawn from the valley. During the same time period, the Walker River through Smith Valley has significantly declined in stream efficiency, suggesting that groundwater pumping is leading to more river water leaving the channel to the groundwater table each year.

== Smith Valley High School notable alumni ==
- Robin L. Titus, Republican member of the Nevada Assembly

== See also ==
- Upper Colony Fire
