= N59 =

N59 may refer to:

- N59 road (Ireland)
- N59 highway (Philippines)
- HMS Ursula (N59), a submarine of the Royal Navy
- Nebraska Highway 59, in the United States
- Rosaschi Air Park, in Lyon County, Nevada, United States
