= Yerington Municipal Airport =

Airport in Nevada, United States

- IATA: EYR; ICAO: none; FAA LID: O43

Summary
- Airport type: Public
- Owner: City of Yerington
- Serves: Yerington, Nevada
- Elevation AMSL: 4,382 ft (1,336 m)
- Coordinates: 39°00′20″N 119°09′24″W

Map
- Location within Nevada Location within the United States

Runways
Direction	Length		Surface
Direction	ft	m	Surface
1/19	5,822	1,775	Asphalt

Statistics (2023)
- Aircraft operations (year ending 6/30/2023): 6,735
- Based aircraft: 19
- Source: Federal Aviation Administration

Yerington Municipal Airport (IATA: EYR, FAA LID: O43) is a mile north of Yerington, in Lyon County, Nevada. The National Plan of Integrated Airport Systems for 2011–2015 categorized it as a general aviation facility.

== Facilities ==
The airport covers 101 acres (41 ha) at an elevation of 4,382 feet (1,336 m). Its single runway, 1/19, is 5,822 by 75 feet (1,775 x 23 m).

In the year ending June 30, 2023 the airport had 6,735 aircraft operations, average 129 per week: 87% general aviation, 7% air taxi, and 6% military. 19 aircraft were then based here: 18 single-engine and 1 multi-engine.

== See also ==
- List of airports in Nevada
