= Rosaschi Air Park =

- IATA: none; ICAO: none; FAA LID: N59

Summary
- Airport type: Public
- Owner: U.S. Bureau of Land Management
- Serves: Smith, Nevada
- Elevation AMSL: 4,809 ft / 1,466 m
- Coordinates: 38°50′22″N 119°20′18″W

Map
- Location of airport in Nevada N59 (the United States)

Runways
Direction	Length		Surface
Direction	ft	m	Surface
7/25	4,800	1,463	Asphalt
17/35	3,700	1,128	Dirt

Statistics (2019)
- Aircraft operations (year ending 10/31/2019): 1,636
- Based aircraft: 2
- Source: Federal Aviation Administration

Rosaschi Air Park (FAA LID: N59) is a public use airport owned by the U.S. Bureau of Land Management and located two nautical miles (4 km) north of the central business district of Smith, in Lyon County, Nevada, United States.

== Facilities and aircraft ==
Rosaschi Air Park covers an area of 482 acres (195 ha) at an elevation of 4,809 feet (1,466 m) above mean sea level. It has two runways: 7/25 is 4,800 by 32 feet (1,463 x 10 m) with an asphalt surface and 17/35 is 3,700 by 64 feet (1,128 x 20 m) with a dirt surface.

For the 12-month period ending October 31, 2019, the airport had 1,636 aircraft operations, an average of 31 per week: 98% general aviation and 2% military. At that time 2 aircraft were based here: both single-engine.

== See also ==
- List of airports in Nevada
