= Sweetwater, Nevada =

Ghost town in Nevada, United States

Coordinates: 38°27′45″N 119°10′30″W

Sweetwater is an extinct town in Lyon County, in the U.S. state of Nevada.

== History ==
A post office was established at Sweetwater in 1870, and remained in operation until 1925. The community took its name from the Sweetwater Mountains.
