= Joe Dini =

American politician

Joseph E. Dini, Jr.
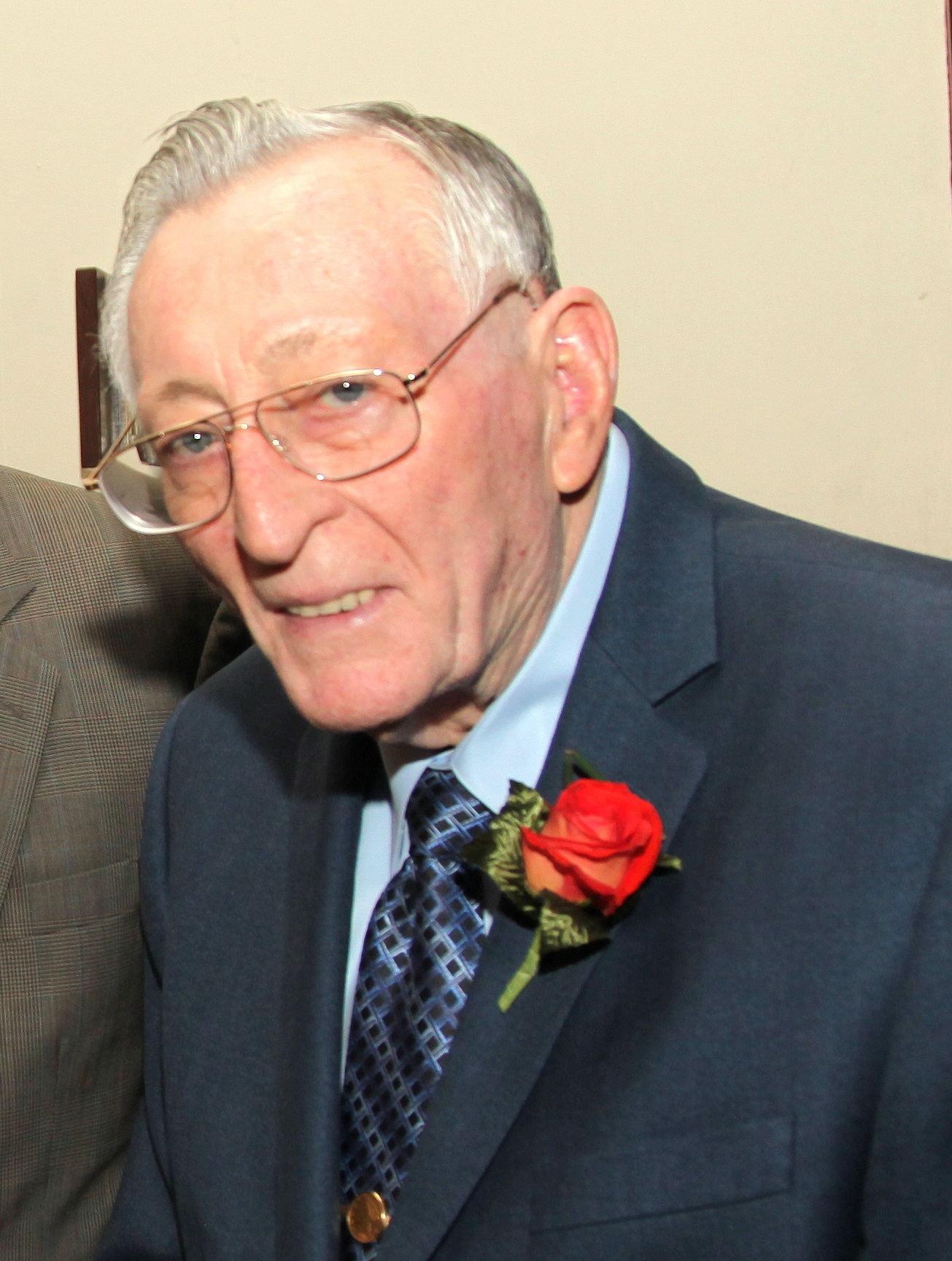

Member of the Nevada Assembly from the 38th district
- In office 1967–2001

Personal details
- Born: March 28, 1929 Yerington, Nevada
- Died: April 10, 2014 (aged 85) Reno, Nevada
- Party: Democratic
- Spouse: Mouryne Landing Dini
- Children: Jay, George, David, Michael
- Education: University of Nevada
- Occupation: Casino Owner

Joseph E. Dini Jr. (March 28, 1929 – April 10, 2014) was a Nevada state assemblyman, casino owner, from Yerington, Nevada. In 1996 Dini was ranked the tenth most influential Nevadan in a survey conducted by the Las Vegas Sun, a list that included Steve Wynn, Bill Raggio, then Governor Bob Miller and former Governor Mike O'Callaghan.

== Political career ==
Dini was elected to the state assembly, (which includes Lyon County, Storey County and parts of Carson City) in 1967 and served until 2001 in four special sessions and eighteen regular sessions, making him the longest serving assemblyman in Nevada history. He served as the Speaker of the Assembly for eight sessions at various times between 1977 and 1999, the most sessions in Nevada Assembly history. At one point later in his political career he considered running for Governor of the State of Nevada, but did not. Dini also served as Majority Floor Leader in 1975. He was added to the Assembly Wall of Distinction (established by the Assembly of the Legislature of the State of Nevada to recognize members who have served with great distinction and made exemplary contributions to the State of Nevada) in recognition of his many years of service in the State Assembly and as Speaker of the Assembly.

He died at a hospital in Reno, Nevada on April 10, 2014.

== Dini's Lucky Club ==
In 1960 Joe Dini Jr. purchased Dini's Lucky Club (then one of two casinos in Yerington, Nevada) from his father Giuseppe "Joe" Dini Sr., who had opened the now self-proclaimed "oldest family owned casino in Nevada" in 1933 under the name the Wooden Shoe Club. The casino has been owned by his sons George and Jay since 2007 with Joe Dini Jr. formerly sitting as "chairman emeritus".
