= Uncle Billy Wilson =

American miner

Uncle Billy Wilson was an American miner and rancher in the 19th century. Wilson Canyon and the Wilson Mining District are named after him. His brother David Wilson settled in the Mason Valley with his wife Abigail, who was the first white woman to settle in the valley.
