= Uncle Willy =

Uncle Willy may refer to:

== Fictional characters ==
- Uncle Willy in the 1948 American comedy film The Return of October
- Uncle Willy in the 1956 American musical comedy film High Society
- Uncle Willy in the 1995 American horror comedy film Demon Knight

== Other uses ==
- "Uncle Willy", a 1935 short story by William Faulkner
- Bill Luxton (actor) (1927–2019), Uncle Willy of the Willy and Floyd comedy team
- "Uncle Willy", a song by The Crescendos on the 1988 compilation album Pebbles, Volume 24

== See also ==
- Uncle Billy (disambiguation)
- Uncle Willie, a character from the American comic series Moon Mullins
