= Bald Mountain (Lyon County, Nevada) =

Mountain in Lyon County, Nevada, United States

- Location within Nevada

Highest point
- Elevation: 9,549 ft (2,911 m) NAVD 88
- Prominence: 2,744 ft (836 m)
- Coordinates: 38°32′04″N 119°06′55″W

Geography
- Location: Lyon County, Nevada, U.S.
- Parent range: Pine Grove Hills
- Topo map: USGS WICHMAN CANYON

Bald Mountain is the highest mountain in the Pine Grove Hills of Lyon County in Nevada, United States. It is the most topographically prominent peak in Lyon County and ranks eighty-second among the most topographically prominent peaks in Nevada. The peak is located within the Humboldt-Toiyabe National Forest.
