= Simpson, Nevada =

Unincorporated community in Nevada, US

Coordinates: 38°52′10″N 119°23′58″W

Simpson is an unincorporated community in Lyon County, in the U.S. state of Nevada.

== History ==
A post office was established at Simpson in 1913, and remained in operation until 1943. The community was named after the local Simpson family.
