= Singatse Range =

Mountain range in Lyon County, Nevada, US

- Location within Nevada

Highest point
- Elevation: 1,587 m (5,207 ft)

Geography
- Country: United States
- State: Nevada
- District: Lyon County
- Range coordinates: 39°1′28.699″N 119°16′24.561″W
- Topo map: USGS Lincoln Flat

The Singatse Range is a mountain range in Lyon County, Nevada.

They form one side of the Mason Valley.
