= Pine Grove Hills =

Mountain range in Nevada, United States

- Location within Nevada

Highest point
- Peak: Bald Mountain, Pine Grove Hills
- Elevation: 9,462 ft (2,884 m)
- Coordinates: 38°32′04″N 119°06′58″W

Geography
- Country: United States
- State: Nevada
- District: Lyon County
- Range coordinates: 38°40′39.694″N 119°9′16.548″W
- Topo map: USGS Mount Etna

The Pine Grove Hills are a mountain range in Lyon County, Nevada. The highest point in the range is the summit of Bald Mountain at 9,549 ft (2,911 m).
