= Holbrook Junction, Nevada =

Unincorporated community in Nevada, US

Coordinates: 38°44′02″N 119°33′18″W

Holbrook Junction is an unincorporated community in southeast Douglas County, in the U.S. state of Nevada. The community is at the intersection of US Route 395 and Nevada State Route 208. Topaz Lake lies on the Nevada - California state line two miles south of the community on Route 395.

== History ==
A post office called "Holbrook" was established in 1883, and remained in operation until 1915. The community has the name of Charles Holbrook, original owner of the station. A variant name was "Topaz Junction".
