= Mason, Nevada =

Unincorporated community in Nevada, US

- Unincorporated community
- Location within Nevada Location within the United States
- Coordinates: 38°57′00″N 119°11′25″W
- Country: United States
- State: Nevada
- County: Lyon
- Elevation: 4,429 ft (1,350 m)
- Time zone: UTC-8 (Pacific (PST))
  - Summer (DST): UTC-7 (PDT)
- Area code: 775
- GNIS feature ID: 848584

Mason is an unincorporated community in Lyon County, Nevada, United States.

== History ==
A post office was established at Mason in 1908, and remained in operation until 1961. The community was named after Henry "Hock" Mason, a pioneer citizen.

== Notable people ==
- Edward Cornelius Reed Jr., United States District Court judge
