= Wellington, Nevada =

Unincorporated community in Nevada, US

- Unincorporated town
- Location within Nevada Location within the United States
- Coordinates: 38°45′20″N 119°22′34″W
- Country: United States
- State: Nevada
- County: Lyon
- Elevation: 4,836 ft (1,474 m)
- Time zone: UTC-8 (Pacific (PST))
  - Summer (DST): UTC-7 (PDT)
- ZIP code: 89444
- GNIS feature ID: 848674

Nevada Historical Marker
- Reference no.: 74

Wellington (also Wellingtons or Wellingtons Station) is an unincorporated town in southwestern Lyon County, Nevada, United States. It lies along State Route 208, southwest of the city of Yerington, the county seat of Lyon County. Wellington has a post office with the ZIP code 89444,

== History ==
A post office was first established at Wellington in 1865. The community was named after one Major Wellington, a businessperson in the stagecoach industry.
