= Smith, Nevada =

Unincorporated community in Nevada, US

- Unincorporated community
- Location within Nevada Location within the United States
- Coordinates: 38°48′0″N 119°19′39″W
- Country: United States
- State: Nevada
- County: Lyon
- Elevation: 4,767 ft (1,453 m)
- Time zone: UTC-8 (Pacific (PST))
  - Summer (DST): UTC-7 (PDT)
- ZIP code: 89430
- Area code: 775
- GNIS feature ID: 845667

Smith is a small unincorporated community in Lyon County, Nevada.

== History ==
The first settlement at Smith was made in 1859. The community was named after the T. B. Smith family, which settled near the site. A post office was established at Smith in 1892.

== Transportation ==
Air service is located at Rosaschi Air Park.
