= Mason Valley (Nevada) =

Valley in Nevada, USA

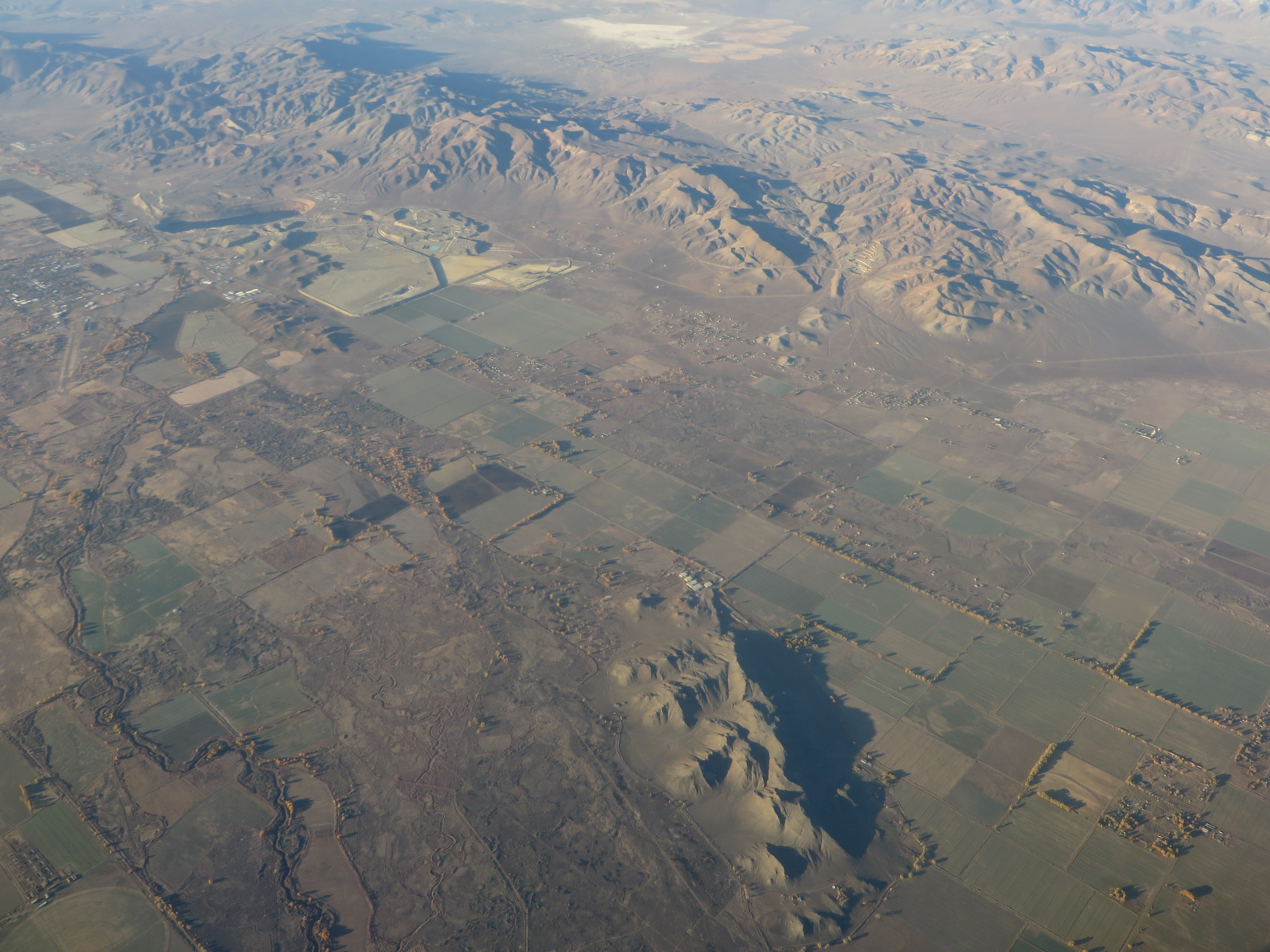
- 2014 aerial photo of Mason Valley

- Location within Nevada

Geography
- Country: United States
- State: Nevada
- Coordinates: 39.09°N 119.14°W
- Interactive map of Mason Valley (Nevada)

The Mason Valley is a valley in western Nevada, between the Singatse Range and the Wassuk Range in Lyon County, Nevada.

The Walker River flows through the valley from south to north. The city of Yerington is located in the center of the valley. The Pine Nut Mountains are nearby.

Mason Valley Wildlife Management Area is located at the extreme north of the valley.
