= Lyon County, Nevada =

County in Nevada, United States

- County
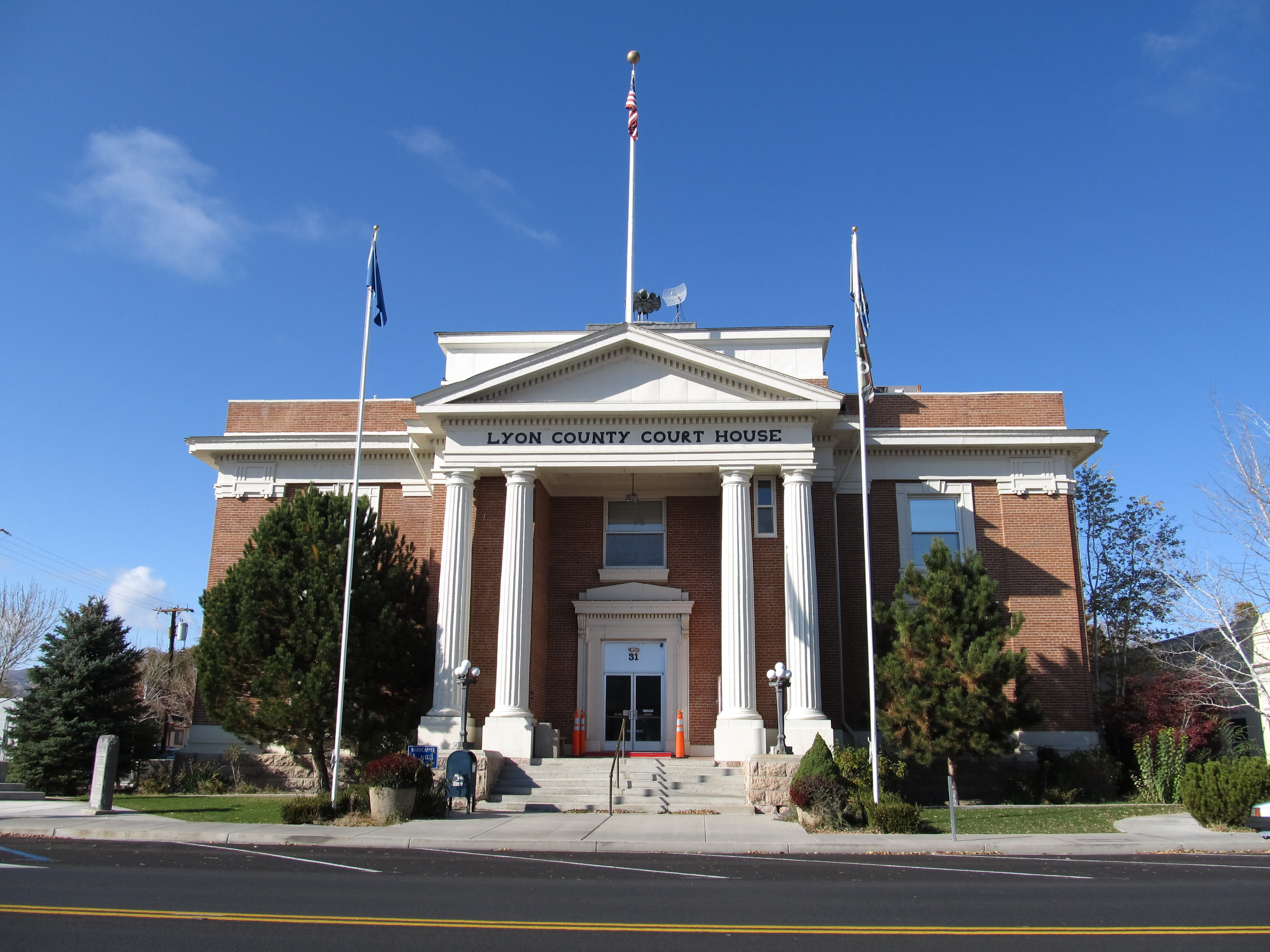
- Lyon County Courthouse in Yerington

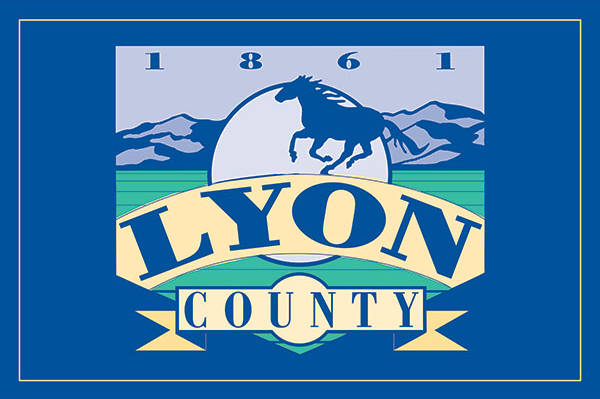
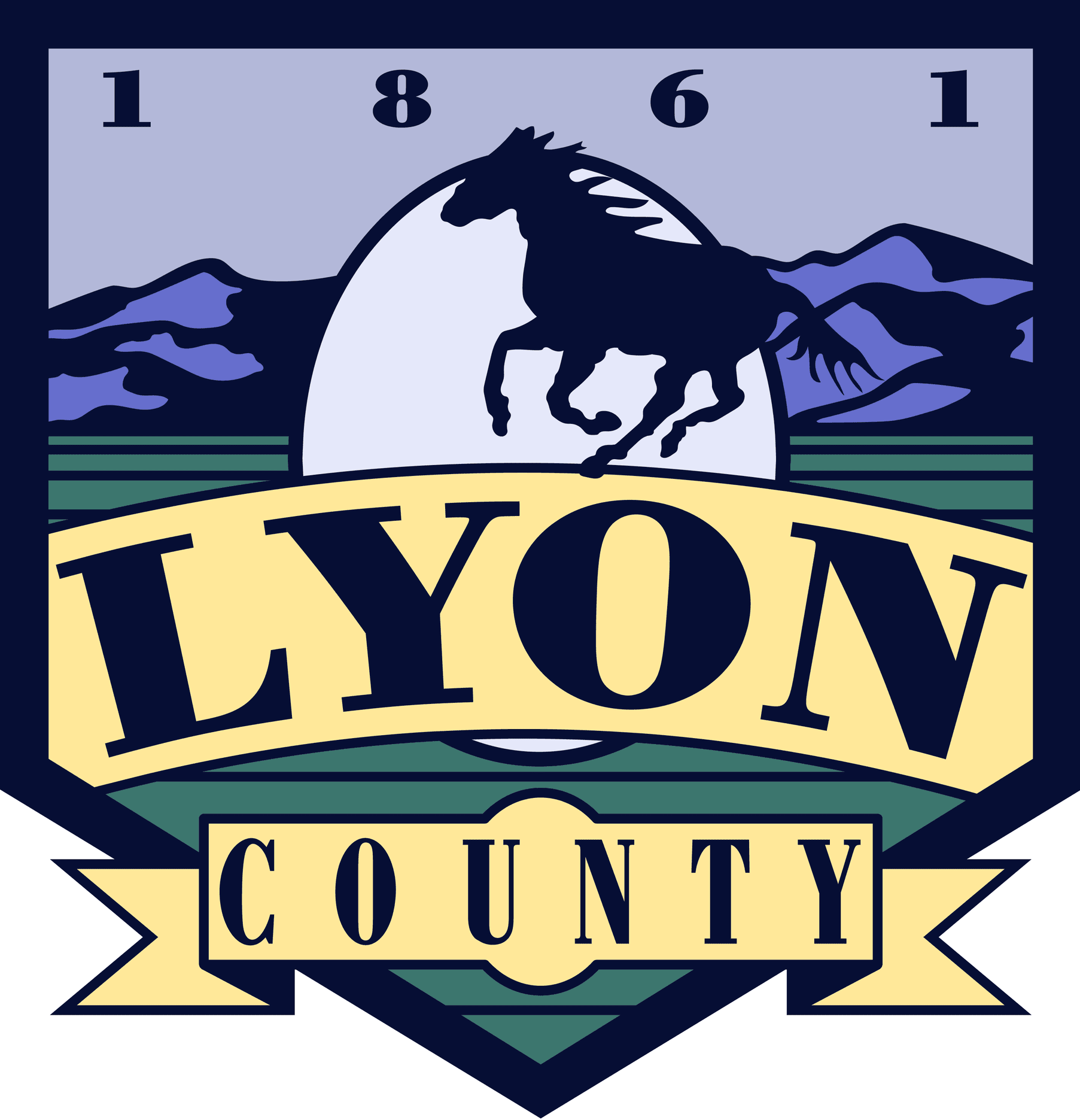
- Flag Logo

- Location within the U.S. state of Nevada
- Coordinates: 39°01′N 119°11′W
- Country: United States
- State: Nevada
- Founded: 1861; 165 years ago
- Named for: Nathaniel Lyon
- Seat: Yerington
- Largest city: Fernley

Area
  - Total: 2,024 sq mi (5,240 km^{2})
  - Land: 2,001 sq mi (5,180 km^{2})
  - Water: 23 sq mi (60 km^{2}) 1.1%

Population (2020)
  - Total: 59,235
  - Estimate (2025): 65,088 ▲
  - Density: 29.60/sq mi (11.43/km^{2})
- Time zone: UTC−8 (Pacific)
  - Summer (DST): UTC−7 (PDT)
- Congressional districts: 2nd, 4th
- Website: lyon-county.org

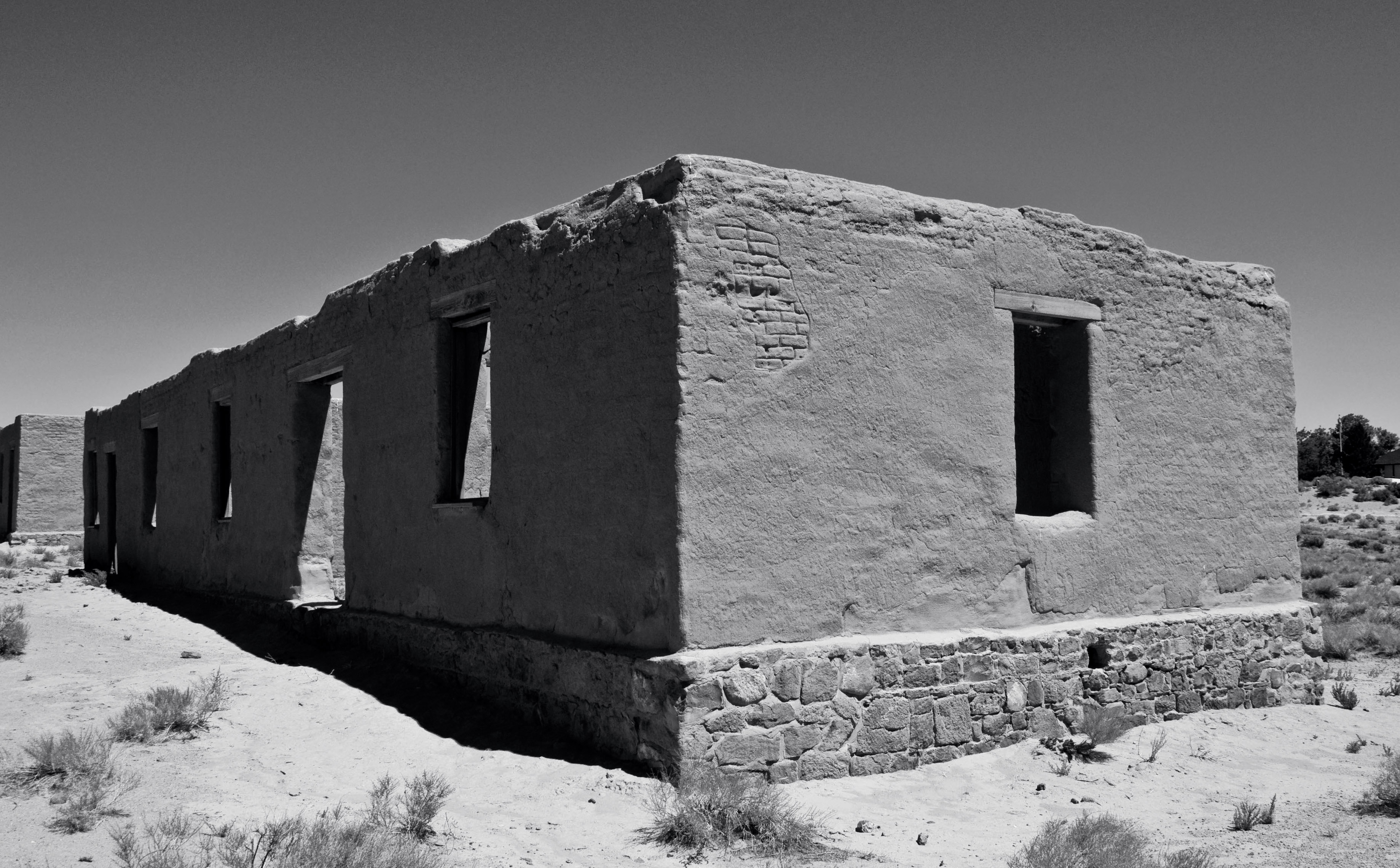
Ruins at Fort Churchill State Historic Park

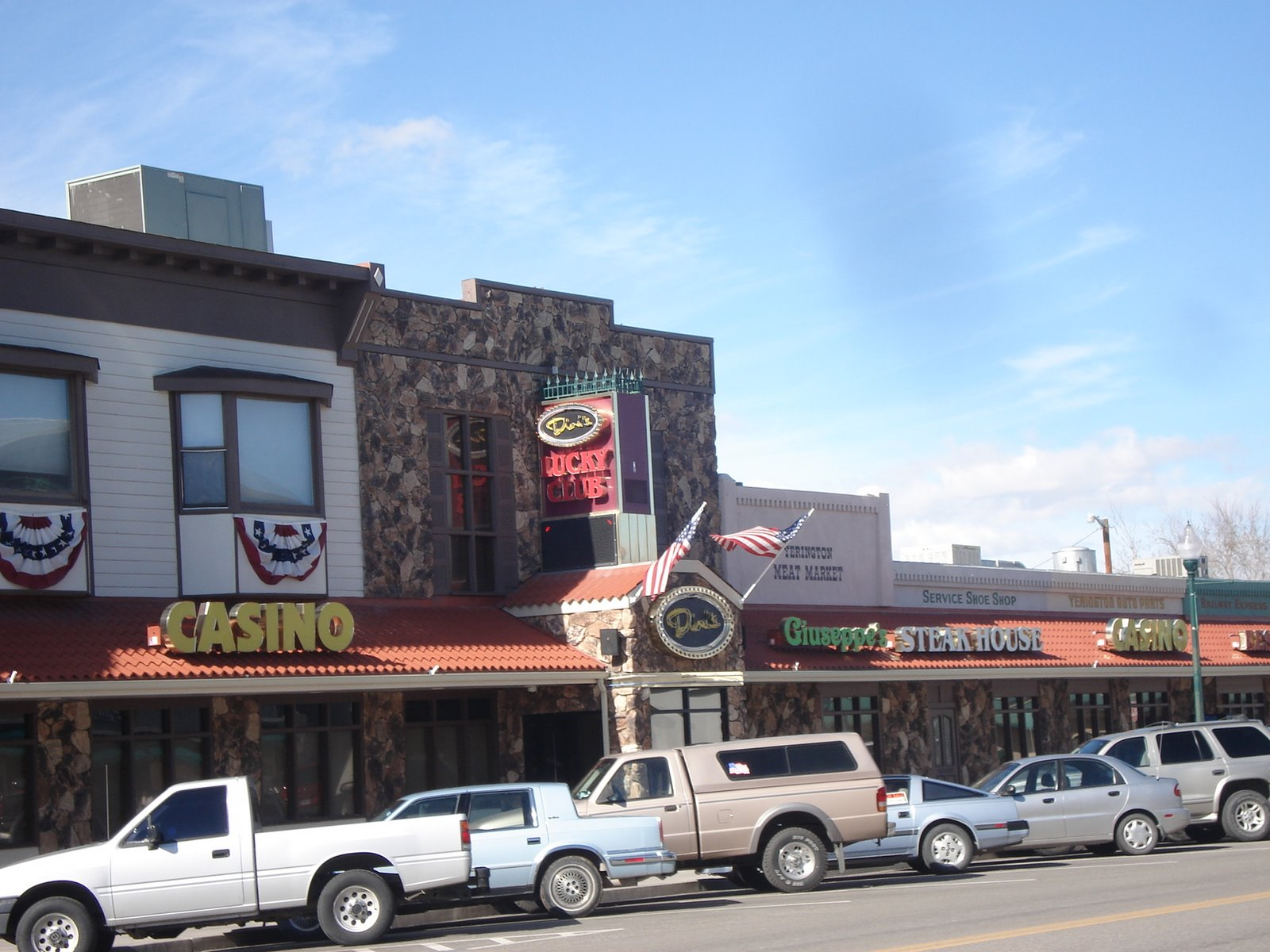
Dini's Lucky Club in Yerington

Lyon County is a county in the U.S. state of Nevada. As of the 2020 census, its population was 59,235. Its county seat is Yerington. Lyon County is a part of the Reno metropolitan area.

== History ==
Lyon County was one of the nine original counties created on November 25, 1861. It was named after Nathaniel Lyon, the first Union general to be killed in the Civil War. Its first county seat was established at Dayton on November 29, 1861, which had just changed its name from Nevada City in 1862, and which had been called Chinatown before that. After the Dayton Court House burned down in 1909, the seat was moved to Yerington in 1911. Reportedly, it was named for Captain Robert Lyon, a survivor of the Pyramid Lake War in 1860, but Nevada State Archives staff discovered a county seal with the picture of the Civil War general.

== Geography ==
According to the U.S. Census Bureau, the county has a total area of 2,024 square miles (5,240 km^{2}), of which 23 sq mi (60 km^{2}) (1.1%) are covered by water. It is the fourth-smallest county in Nevada by area. The highest elevation is about 10,565 feet (3,220 m) on the northeast ridge of Middle Sister, the peak of which is located in adjacent Mono County, California, while the highest independent mountain completely within Lyon County is the nearby East Sister. The most topographically prominent peak in Lyon County is Bald Mountain.

Part of the Toiyabe National Forest is located within Lyon County.

=== Major highways ===
- Interstate 11 (Future)
- Interstate 80
- Interstate 80 Business (Wadsworth–Fernley)
- U.S. Route 50
- U.S. Route 95
- U.S. Route 50 Alternate
- U.S. Route 95 Alternate
- State Route 208
- State Route 338
- State Route 339
- State Route 340
- State Route 341
- State Route 427
- State Route 439
- State Route 823
- State Route 824
- State Route 827
- State Route 828
- State Route 829

=== Adjacent counties and city ===
- Washoe County - north
- Storey County - northwest
- Churchill County - east
- Douglas County - west
- Carson City - west
- Mineral County - southeast
- Mono County, California - southwest

== Demographics ==
Historical population
Census	Pop.	Note	%±
1870	1,837		—
1880	2,409		31.1%
1890	1,987		−17.5%
1900	2,268		14.1%
1910	3,568		57.3%
1920	4,078		14.3%
1930	3,810		−6.6%
1940	4,076		7.0%
1950	3,679		−9.7%
1960	6,143		67.0%
1970	8,221		33.8%
1980	13,594		65.4%
1990	20,001		47.1%
2000	34,501		72.5%
2010	51,980		50.7%
2020	59,235		14.0%
2025 (est.)	65,088	▲	9.9%
U.S. Decennial Census; 1790-1960 1900-1990; 1990-2000 2010-2020

=== Racial and ethnic composition ===
Lyon County, Nevada – Racial and ethnic composition Note: the US Census treats Hispanic/Latino as an ethnic category. This table excludes Latinos from the racial categories and assigns them to a separate category. Hispanics/Latinos may be of any race.
Race / Ethnicity (NH = Non-Hispanic)	Pop 1980	Pop 1990	Pop 2000	Pop 2010	Pop 2020	% 1980	% 1990	% 2000	% 2010	% 2020
White alone (NH)	12,297	17,707	28,791	40,634	42,350	90.46%	88.53%	83.45%	78.17%	71.49%
Black or African American alone (NH)	17	65	202	363	488	0.13%	0.32%	0.59%	0.70%	0.82%
Native American or Alaska Native alone (NH)	526	572	727	1,061	1,083	3.87%	2.86%	2.11%	2.04%	1.83%
Asian alone (NH)	70	140	198	701	924	0.51%	0.70%	0.57%	1.35%	1.56%
Native Hawaiian or Pacific Islander alone (NH)	x	x	42	124	168	x	x	0.12%	0.24%	0.28%
Other race alone (NH)	16	6	43	79	252	0.12%	0.03%	0.12%	0.15%	0.43%
Mixed race or Multiracial (NH)	x	x	714	1,344	3,631	x	x	2.07%	2.59%	6.13%
Hispanic or Latino (any race)	668	1,511	3,784	7,674	10,339	4.91%	7.55%	10.97%	14.76%	17.45%
Total	13,594	20,001	34,501	51,980	59,235	100.00%	100.00%	100.00%	100.00%	100.00%

=== 2020 census ===
As of the 2020 census, the county had a population of 59,235. The median age was 43.0 years; 22.1% of residents were under 18, and 21.8% were 65 or older. For every 100 females, there were 103.1 males, and for every 100 females 18 and over, there were 102.1 males 18 and over. About 55.4% of residents lived in urban areas, while 44.6% lived in rural areas.

The racial makeup of the county was 75.7% White, 0.9% Black or African American, 2.3% American Indian and Alaska Native, 1.7% Asian, 0.3% Native Hawaiian and Pacific Islander, 7.2% from some other race, and 12.0% from two or more races. Hispanic or Latino residents of any race comprised 17.5% of the population.

Of the 22,704 households in the county, 30.0% had children under 18 living with them and 20.0% had a female householder with no spouse or partner present, 23.3% of all households were made up of individuals, and 12.2% had someone living alone who was 65 or older.

Of the 24,401 housing units, 7.0% were vacant. Among occupied housing units, 74.7% were owner-occupied and 25.3% were renter-occupied. The homeowner vacancy rate was 2.2% and the rental vacancy rate was 6.3%.

=== 2010 census ===
As of the 2010 United States census, there were 51,980 people, 19,808 households, and 14,137 families living in the county. The population density was 26.0 inhabitants per square mile (10.0/km^{2}). There were 22,547 housing units at an average density of 11.3 units per square mile (4.4 units/km^{2}). The racial makeup of the county was 85.0% white, 2.5% American Indian, 1.4% Asian, 0.8% black or African American, 0.3% Pacific islander, 6.4% from other races, and 3.7% from two or more races. Those of Hispanic or Latino origin made up 14.8% of the population. In terms of ancestry, 20.0% were German, 18.5% were English, 15.5% were Irish, 5.9% were Italian, and 5.3% were American.

Of the 19,808 households, 33.2% had children under 18 living with them, 55.3% were married couples living together, 10.2% had a female householder with no husband present, 28.6% were not families, and 22.1% were made up of individuals. The average household size was 2.61, and the average family size was 3.02. The median age was 40.9 years.

In the county, the median income for a household was $48,433 and for a family was $56,106. Males had a median income of $45,319 versus $31,536 for females. The per capita income for the county was $21,041. About 8.7% of families and 12.8% of the population were below the poverty line, including 14.9% of those under 18 and 6.6% of those 65 or over.

=== 2000 census ===
As of the 2000 census 34,501 people, 13,007 households, and 9,443 families were living in the county. The population density was 17 people per square mile (6.6 people/km^{2}). The 14,279 housing units had an average density of 7 units per square mile (2.7/km^{2}). The racial makeup of the county was 88.62% White, 0.65% African American, 2.45% Native American, 0.61% Asian, 0.14% Pacific Islander, 4.59% from other races, and 2.94% from two or more races. About 11.0% of the population were Hispanics or Latinos of any race.

Of the 13,007 households, 33.2% had children under 18 living with them, 58.4% were married couples living together, 9.1% had a female householder with no husband present, and 27.4% were not families. About 21.4% of all households were made up of individuals, and 8.3% had someone living alone who was 65 or older. The average household size was 2.61 and the average family size was 3.02.

In the county, the age distribution was 27.1% under 18, 6.6% from 18 to 24, 27.3% from 25 to 44, 25.2% from 45 to 64, and 13.7% who were 65 or older. The median age was 38 years. For every 100 females, there were 102.5 males. For every 100 females 18 and over, there were 100.0 males.

The median income for a household in the county was $40,699 and for a family was $44,887. Males had a median income of $34,034 versus $25,914 for females. The per capita income for the county was $18,543. About 7.2% of families and 10.4% of the population were below the poverty line, including 14.1% of those under 18 and 7.1% of those age 65 or over.

From 2000 until 2008, Lyon County was one of the fastest-growing counties in the United States. However, its growth rate collapsed during 2008.

== Communities ==
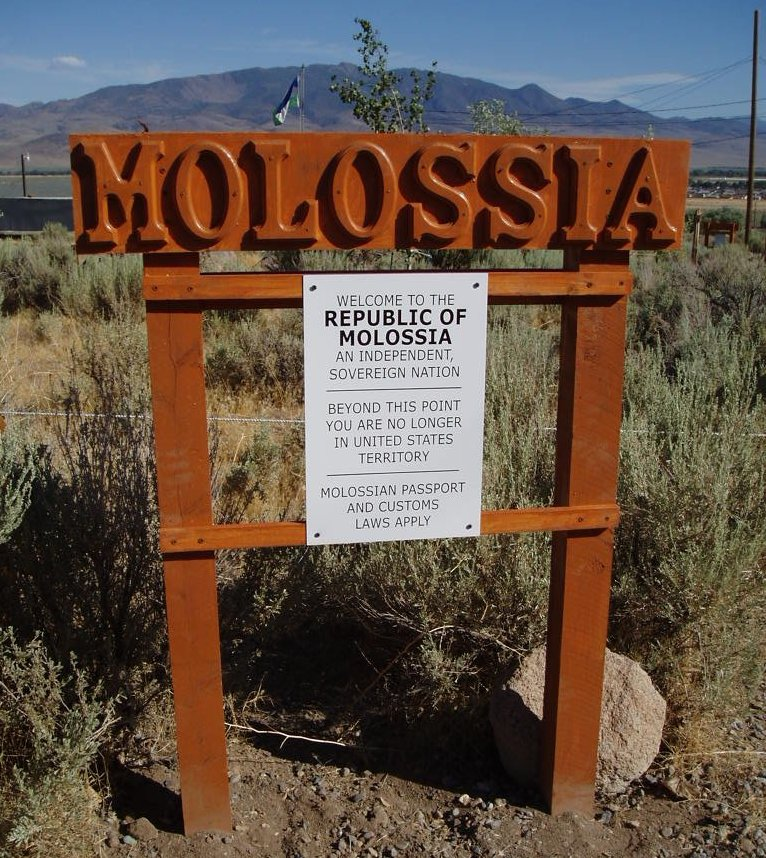
"Republic of Molossia", near Dayton

=== Cities ===
- Fernley
- Yerington (county seat)

=== Census-designated places ===
- Dayton
- Silver City
- Silver Springs
- Smith Valley
- Stagecoach

=== Other unincorporated places ===
- Argo
- Artesia
- Bucklands Station
- Cambridge
- Churchhill
- Como
- Davis Station
- Greenville
- Hoye
- Hudson
- Johntown
- Ludwig
- Lux
- Marshland
- Mason
- Mound House
- Nordyke
- Palmyra
- Pine Grove
- Ramsey
- Rapids City
- Rockland
- Simpson
- Stone Cabin
- Sutro
- Sweetwater
- Thompson
- Tippecanoe
- Twin Flat
- Wabuska
- Walker River
- Weeks
- Wellington
- Willington Springs
- Wichman

== Politics ==
Although not so historically Republican as neighboring Douglas County, Lyon is nonetheless a powerfully Republican county. The last Democrat to carry the county was Franklin D. Roosevelt in 1940 – the county was one of three in Nevada to vote for Barry Goldwater in 1964 – and Jimmy Carter in 1976 is the last Democrat to pass 40% of Lyon County's vote.

An advisory question about Lyon County's legal brothels was put on the 2018 ballot. "Lyon County Question 1" asked whether or not voters wanted to rescind Title 3, Chapter 5, which is the Lyon County Brothel Ordinance. Of 20,674 votes cast, 4,031 voted to have it rescinded, and 16,643 voted to keep the brothels open in Lyon County.

United States presidential election results for Lyon County, Nevada
Year	Republican		Democratic		Third party(ies)	
Year	No.	%	No.	%	No.	%
1904	392	67.82%	164	28.37%	22	3.81%
1908	458	50.05%	364	39.78%	93	10.16%
1912	136	11.64%	438	37.50%	594	50.86%
1916	669	40.92%	769	47.03%	197	12.05%
1920	945	67.12%	344	24.43%	119	8.45%
1924	618	47.43%	231	17.73%	454	34.84%
1928	927	56.84%	704	43.16%	0	0.00%
1932	456	31.69%	983	68.31%	0	0.00%
1936	487	28.82%	1,203	71.18%	0	0.00%
1940	963	47.44%	1,067	52.56%	0	0.00%
1944	895	55.83%	708	44.17%	0	0.00%
1948	967	59.22%	629	38.52%	37	2.27%
1952	1,453	71.61%	576	28.39%	0	0.00%
1956	1,697	68.48%	781	31.52%	0	0.00%
1960	1,494	59.69%	1,009	40.31%	0	0.00%
1964	1,397	51.28%	1,327	48.72%	0	0.00%
1968	1,616	53.88%	939	31.31%	444	14.80%
1972	2,813	74.58%	959	25.42%	0	0.00%
1976	2,068	49.69%	1,866	44.83%	228	5.48%
1980	3,709	67.98%	1,288	23.61%	459	8.41%
1984	4,320	69.94%	1,673	27.08%	184	2.98%
1988	4,390	62.83%	2,301	32.93%	296	4.24%
1992	3,509	38.12%	2,777	30.17%	2,918	31.70%
1996	4,753	49.01%	3,419	35.25%	1,527	15.74%
2000	7,270	60.62%	3,955	32.98%	767	6.40%
2004	11,136	64.93%	5,637	32.87%	378	2.20%
2008	12,154	57.59%	8,405	39.83%	544	2.58%
2012	13,520	62.99%	7,380	34.38%	565	2.63%
2016	16,005	67.36%	6,146	25.86%	1,611	6.78%
2020	20,914	69.16%	8,473	28.02%	851	2.81%
2024	23,861	71.14%	8,954	26.70%	726	2.16%

United States Senate election results for Lyon County, Nevada1
Year	Republican		Democratic		Third party(ies)	
Year	No.	%	No.	%	No.	%
2024	21,892	65.77%	9,182	27.58%	2,213	6.65%

== Education ==
Lyon County has 16 schools provided by the Lyon County School District.

== Transportation ==
=== Air ===
The three public airports in Lyon County are:

- Yerington Municipal Airport, with a 5,800-foot-long runway
- Silver Springs Airport, with a 6000-foot-long runway (its runway lights are visible when driving down on Fir Street from Ramsey Weeks cut-off to 95A)
- Tiger Field on US 95A about 3 miles from Fernley, with a gravel runway of 2,750 feet and a paved runway of 5,600 feet

=== Railroads ===
The Central Pacific (the first transcontinental railroad) ran through the county, although a portion of the original route has been shifted for a new route south of Wadsworth in favor of Fernley. The Central Pacific later became the Southern Pacific Railroad which was merged into Union Pacific in 1996.

The Virginia and Truckee Railroad runs through Mound House in western Lyon County, on its way from Carson City to Virginia City.

The narrow-gauge Carson and Colorado Railroad had its terminus in Mound House, where it intersected with the V&T. It traveled east through Dayton, then turned south to the Mason Valley, and east again on its way to Walker Lake. Later a branch line connected the C&C to the Southern Pacific at Hazen. While the line west of Silver Springs was removed, the line from Hazen to Walker Lake (now standard gauge) is still in place, and used several times each week by the Union Pacific to service the NV Energy Fort Churchill Generating Station, near Yerington.

The Eagle Salt Works Railroad ran for 13.5 miles, primarily on the original Central Pacific grade from Luva (two miles east of Fernley) to Eagle Salt Works Railroad.

The Nevada Copper Belt Railroad ran on the west side of the Mason Valley.

=== Train ===
Amtrak's California Zephyr passenger train passes through, but does not stop in Lyon County. The nearest Amtrak passenger stations are located in Reno and Winnemucca. The California Zephyr runs from the San Francisco Bay Area to Chicago via Salt Lake City, Denver and Omaha.

== Entertainment ==
Prostitution is licensed and legalized in Lyon county. There are several open ranches, including:

- Moonlite Bunny Ranch (the most famous Lyon Country brothel)
- Sagebrush Ranch

All are located in Mound House, which is on US Highway 50 adjacent to the line dividing Lyon and Carson City counties.

Several gambling casinos are located in various parts of Lyon County, as are numerous restaurants, clubs, saloons, etc.

== See also ==
- National Register of Historic Places listings in Lyon County, Nevada
