= Yerington, Nevada =

City in Nevada, United States

- City
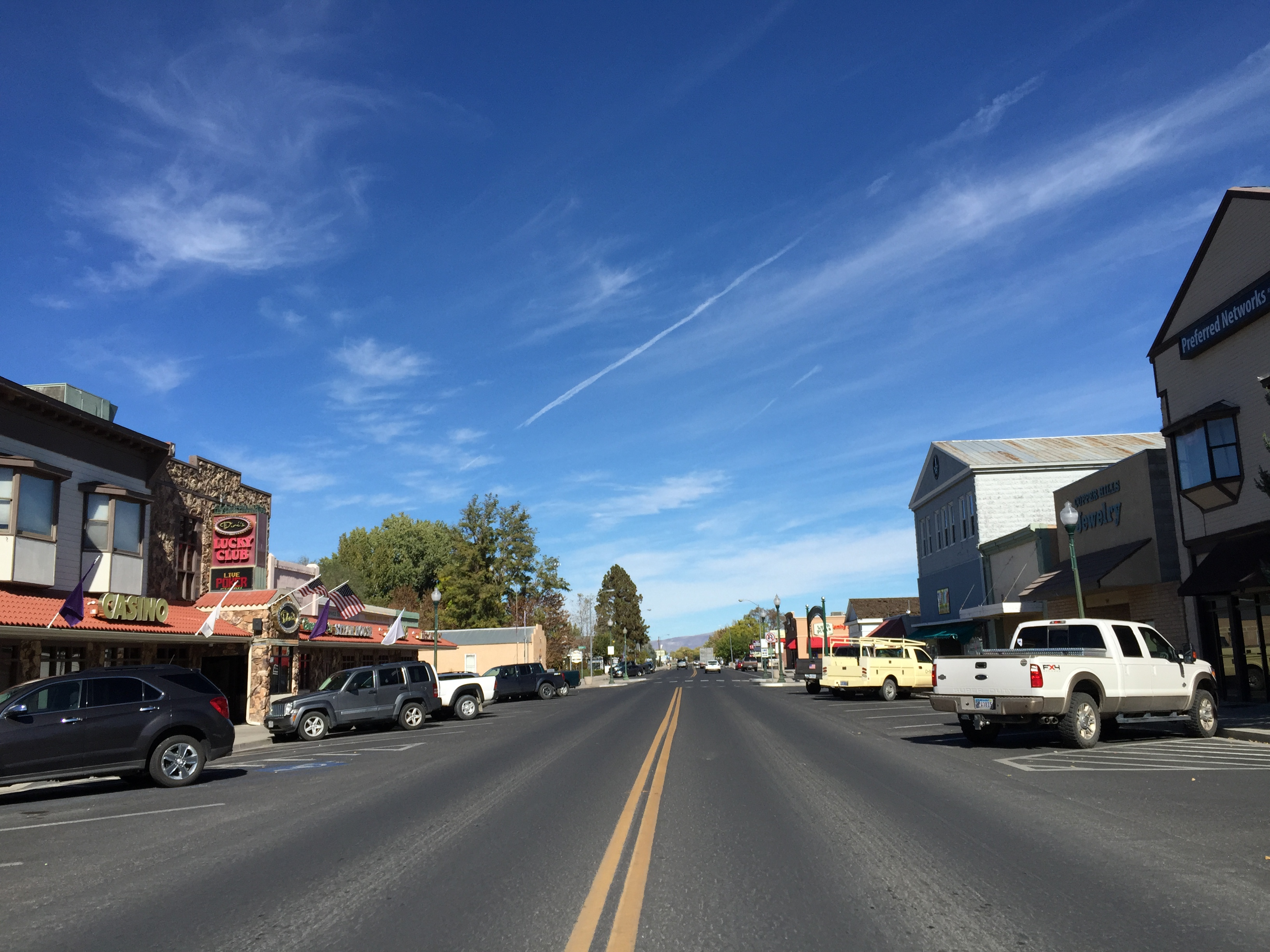
- Main Street (SR 208) in downtown Yerington

- Seal
- Nickname: The Onion Capital of the West
- Motto: "Preserving Our History While Planning Our Future"
- Location of Yerington, Nevada

- Location in the United States
- Coordinates: 38°59′07″N 119°09′30″W
- Country: United States
- State: Nevada
- County: Lyon
- Founded: August 6, 1871; 155 years ago
- Incorporated: March 17, 1907; 119 years ago
- Named for: Henry M. Yerington

Area
  - Total: 29.46 sq mi (76.30 km^{2})
  - Land: 29.46 sq mi (76.30 km^{2})
  - Water: 0 sq mi (0.00 km^{2})
- Elevation: 4,577 ft (1,395 m)

Population (2020)
  - Total: 3,121
  - Density: 106/sq mi (40.9/km^{2})
- Time zone: UTC−8 (PST)
  - Summer (DST): UTC−7 (PDT)
- ZIP code: 89447
- Area code: 775
- FIPS code: 32-85400
- GNIS feature ID: 2412318
- Website: www.yerington.net

Yerington is a city in Lyon County, Nevada, United States. The population was 3,121 at the 2020 census. It is the current county seat of Lyon County, with the first county seat having been established at Dayton on November 29, 1861. It is named after Henry M. Yerington, superintendent of the Virginia and Truckee Railroad from 1868 to 1910.

== History ==
=== Native people ===
The Yerington Paiute Tribe of the Yerington Colony and Campbell Ranch is headquartered in Yerington. The people, known as Numu (human beings) in their own language, have lived in the Smith and Mason Valleys in Northwestern Nevada, since around 1000 A.D.

=== City ===
The community was formerly named Greenfield, Mason Valley, and Pizen Switch (irreverent nickname from the time when Yerington was a transfer - or switch - stop, and the local whiskey was so bad that it was called "poison". "Poison" came out sounding like "pizen" because of local vernacular, and the name "Pizen Switch" stuck.)

It was founded on August 6, 1871. The city was incorporated on March 17, 1907.

After the Dayton Court House burned down in 1909, the county seat was moved to Yerington in 1911.

=== Wilson Ranch fire balloon ===
During World War II, one of many Japanese Fu-Go balloon bombs launched at the United States landed on the Wilson Ranch near Yerington. The ranchers, not knowing what it was, attempted to notify the authorities by mail, but did not receive a response until after they cut it up and used it as a hay tarp.

== Geography ==
Yerington is located at the intersection of US 95A and Nevada State Route 208. It is 33 miles (53 km) south of Silver Springs and U.S. Route 50, 47 miles (76 km) south of Fernley and Interstate 80, 23 miles (37 km) west of Schurz and U.S. Route 95, and 23 miles (37 km) northeast of Smith Valley.

According to the United States Census Bureau, the city has a total area of 29.5 square miles (76.3 km^{2}), all land. The Walker River is formed in southern Lyon County, 9 miles (14 km) south of Yerington, by the confluence of the East Walker and West Walker rivers. It flows into the Mason Valley where Yerington is located, and is used for irrigation.

=== Climate ===
Yerington experiences a cool desert climate. Yerington is noticeably more arid than areas even marginally closer to the Sierra Nevada – it receives only half as much precipitation as Carson City, a third as much as South Lake Tahoe and only one-eighth as much as Nevada City, California on the western Sierra slopes. Because the drying effect of the Pine Nut Mountains is most pronounced in the winter, Yerington receives very little snow in most years, although in the very cold and snowy month of January 1916 as much as 37.0 inches (0.94 m) fell and that season saw a total of 39.5 inches (1.00 m). January 2017 proved the first month to exceed 4 inches or 101.6 millimetres of precipitation when it totaled 4.55 inches (115.6 mm). The wettest "rain year" has been from July 1955 to June 1956 with 9.06 inches (230.1 mm) and the driest from July 1949 to June 1950 with only 1.62 inches (41.1 mm), although the calendar year of 1983 saw 10.58 inches (268.7 mm). The most precipitation in one day is 2.02 inches (51.3 mm) on September 18, 1955, closely rivaled by December 23 of that year when 2.00 inches (50.8 mm) fell.

During the summer, temperatures are generally hot to very hot in the afternoon, but the high altitude and low humidity means temperature drop to a comfortable level at night. On average, 8.0 afternoons each summer will exceed 100 °F or 37.8 °C and 73.2 afternoons reach 90 °F (32.2 °C). It is rare, though, that minima stay above 68 °F (20.0 °C), although thirteen mornings stayed this warm in 2015. The hottest minimum has been 78 °F (25.6 °C) on July 22, 2003, and the hottest temperature 107 °F (41.7 °C) on July 15, 2014. In the winter, afternoons are sunny and cool to cold with all but 4.6 topping freezing on average, although mornings typically range from freezing to frigid: 135.5 mornings fall below freezing in an average year and 0.6 fall to or below 0 °F (−17.8 °C). The coldest temperature on record is −26 °F (−32.2 °C) on January 21, 1937, and the coldest month January 1949 which averaged 12.4 °F (−10.9 °C) with a mean minimum of −4.6 °F (−20.3 °C). The coldest afternoon is 6 °F (−14.4 °C), which occurred on February 6, 1989, and December 22, 1990.

Climate data for Yerington, Nevada, 1991–2020 normals, extremes 1894–present
Month	Jan	Feb	Mar	Apr	May	Jun	Jul	Aug	Sep	Oct	Nov	Dec	Year
Record high °F (°C)	72 (22)	76 (24)	84 (29)	92 (33)	100 (38)	105 (41)	107 (42)	106 (41)	102 (39)	93 (34)	82 (28)	74 (23)	107 (42)
Mean maximum °F (°C)	61.2 (16.2)	66.0 (18.9)	74.1 (23.4)	80.1 (26.7)	90.3 (32.4)	97.1 (36.2)	102.1 (38.9)	100.3 (37.9)	95.1 (35.1)	85.5 (29.7)	71.3 (21.8)	61.5 (16.4)	102.4 (39.1)
Mean daily maximum °F (°C)	45.8 (7.7)	51.1 (10.6)	59.3 (15.2)	65.4 (18.6)	74.6 (23.7)	85.0 (29.4)	93.4 (34.1)	91.9 (33.3)	83.5 (28.6)	69.6 (20.9)	55.0 (12.8)	44.2 (6.8)	68.2 (20.1)
Daily mean °F (°C)	34.2 (1.2)	38.4 (3.6)	45.5 (7.5)	51.1 (10.6)	59.6 (15.3)	68.5 (20.3)	76.0 (24.4)	74.2 (23.4)	66.2 (19.0)	53.8 (12.1)	41.3 (5.2)	33.0 (0.6)	53.5 (11.9)
Mean daily minimum °F (°C)	22.7 (−5.2)	25.7 (−3.5)	31.8 (−0.1)	36.8 (2.7)	44.6 (7.0)	52.0 (11.1)	58.6 (14.8)	56.5 (13.6)	48.9 (9.4)	38.0 (3.3)	27.6 (−2.4)	21.8 (−5.7)	38.8 (3.7)
Mean minimum °F (°C)	9.9 (−12.3)	13.8 (−10.1)	19.5 (−6.9)	25.7 (−3.5)	32.6 (0.3)	39.5 (4.2)	49.9 (9.9)	47.8 (8.8)	37.4 (3.0)	24.5 (−4.2)	13.6 (−10.2)	7.4 (−13.7)	4.6 (−15.2)
Record low °F (°C)	−26 (−32)	−23 (−31)	−2 (−19)	5 (−15)	15 (−9)	26 (−3)	30 (−1)	26 (−3)	11 (−12)	5 (−15)	−6 (−21)	−20 (−29)	−26 (−32)
Average precipitation inches (mm)	0.54 (14)	0.40 (10)	0.49 (12)	0.33 (8.4)	0.63 (16)	0.42 (11)	0.28 (7.1)	0.22 (5.6)	0.12 (3.0)	0.34 (8.6)	0.39 (9.9)	0.42 (11)	4.58 (116.6)
Average snowfall inches (cm)	0.6 (1.5)	0.4 (1.0)	0.0 (0.0)	0.3 (0.76)	0.0 (0.0)	0.0 (0.0)	0.0 (0.0)	0.0 (0.0)	0.0 (0.0)	0.0 (0.0)	1.0 (2.5)	0.9 (2.3)	3.2 (8.06)
Average precipitation days (≥ 0.01 in)	3.6	3.1	3.3	2.2	3.7	2.3	1.4	1.4	1.0	1.8	2.4	3.0	29.2
Average snowy days (≥ 0.1 in)	0.4	0.3	0.1	0.1	0.0	0.0	0.0	0.0	0.0	0.0	0.2	0.6	1.7
Source 1: NOAA
Source 2: National Weather Service

== Demographics ==
Historical population
Census	Pop.	Note	%±
1910	682		—
1920	1,169		71.4%
1930	1,005		−14.0%
1940	964		−4.1%
1950	1,157		20.0%
1960	1,764		52.5%
1970	2,010		13.9%
1980	2,021		0.5%
1990	2,367		17.1%
2000	2,883		21.8%
2010	3,048		5.7%
2020	3,121		2.4%
U.S. Decennial Census

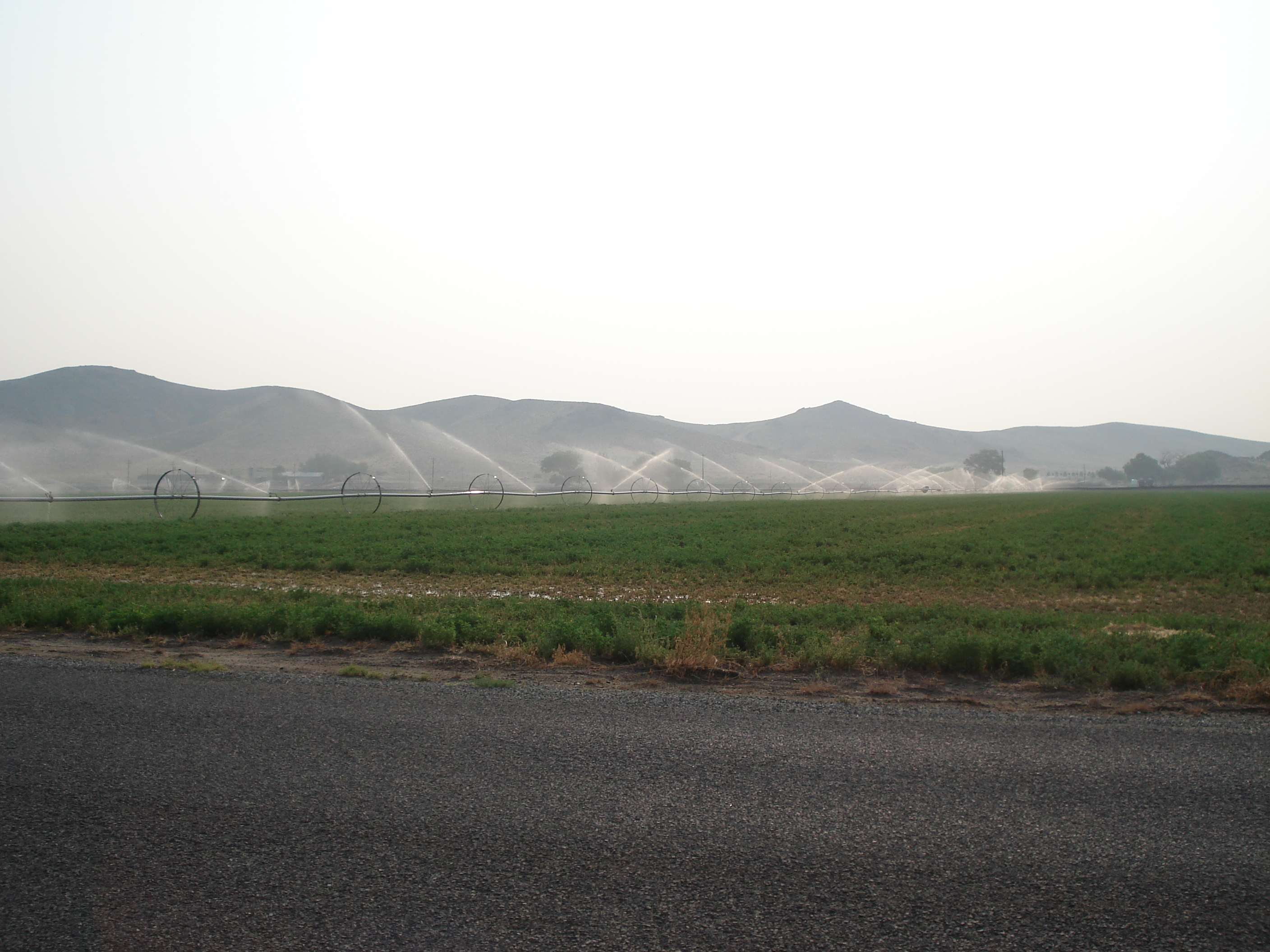
Watering an alfalfa field in Yerington

=== 2020 census ===
As of the 2020 census, Yerington had a population of 3,121. The median age was 44.7 years. 22.1% of residents were under the age of 18 and 25.9% of residents were 65 years of age or older. For every 100 females there were 91.5 males, and for every 100 females age 18 and over there were 89.8 males age 18 and over.

0.0% of residents lived in urban areas, while 100.0% lived in rural areas.

There were 1,394 households in Yerington, of which 30.0% had children under the age of 18 living in them. Of all households, 34.6% were married-couple households, 23.5% were households with a male householder and no spouse or partner present, and 33.1% were households with a female householder and no spouse or partner present. About 38.3% of all households were made up of individuals and 22.7% had someone living alone who was 65 years of age or older.

There were 1,563 housing units, of which 10.8% were vacant. The homeowner vacancy rate was 2.4% and the rental vacancy rate was 9.6%.

Racial composition as of the 2020 census
Race	Number	Percent
White	2,106	67.5%
Black or African American	25	0.8%
American Indian and Alaska Native	216	6.9%
Asian	28	0.9%
Native Hawaiian and Other Pacific Islander	3	0.1%
Some other race	421	13.5%
Two or more races	322	10.3%
Hispanic or Latino (of any race)	770	24.7%

=== 2010 census ===
For the 2010 census, basic statistics show there were 3,048 people, 1,302 households, and 747 families residing in the city. The population density was 1792.9 people per square mile. There were 1,507 housing units at an average density of 886.5 per square mile. The racial makeup of the city was 80.20% White, 0.60% African American, 6.80% Native American, 0.60% Asian, 8.90% from other races, and 3.00% from two or more races. Hispanic or Latino of any race were 18.80% of the population.

=== 2000 census ===
As of the 2000 census, there were 2,883 people, 1,203 households, and 729 families residing in the city. The population density was 1,698.4 people per square mile. There were 1,359 housing units at an average density of 800.6 per square mile. The racial makeup of the city was 84.53% White, 0.17% African American, 6.24% Native American, 0.38% Asian, 5.79% from other races, and 2.88% from two or more races. Hispanic or Latino of any race were 15.44% of the population.

There were 1,203 households, out of which 27.7% had children under the age of 18 living with them, 46.1% were married couples living together, 10.2% had a female householder with no husband present, and 39.4% were non-families. 35.0% of all households were made up of individuals, and 19.6% had someone living alone who was 65 years of age or older. The average household size was 2.29, and the average family size was 2.97.

In the city, the population was spread out, with 24.7% under the age of 18, 8.1% from 18 to 24, 22.2% from 25 to 44, 19.4% from 45 to 64, and 25.7% who were 65 years of age or older. The median age was 41 years. For every 100 females, there were 99.1 males. For every 100 females age 18 and over, there were 92.7 males.

The median income for a household in the city was $31,151, and the median income for a family was $39,038. Males had a median income of $25,724 versus $24,550 for females. The per capita income for the city was $18,640. About 12.6% of families and 17.9% of the population were below the poverty line, including 26.2% of those under age 18 and 12.3% of those age 65 or over.

== In popular culture ==
"Darcy Farrow," a folk song written by Steve Gillette and Tom Campbell, mentions Yerington ("Her eyes shone bright like the pretty lights / That shine in the night out of Yerington town," 7–8) and other places and landmarks in the area, including Virginia City, the Carson Valley, and the Truckee River. Critics have noted the geographical inaccuracy in the line "The Walker runs down to the Carson Valley plain."

== Notable people ==
- Nevada Barr, (1952– ) mystery writer, created the Anna Pigeon series
- Jesse Brinkley, (1976– ) professional boxer, contestant on season one of The Contender
- Joe Dini, (1929–2014) long time member of the Nevada Assembly
- Wovoka, (1856–1932) also known as Jack Wilson. Paiute religious leader

== See also ==
- Anaconda Copper Mine (Nevada)
