= Lake Mead Boulevard =

State highway in Nevada, United States

State Route 147
- Lake Mead Boulevard
- Lake Mead Boulevard in red, unsigned SR 147 in blue, former SR 147 in green

Route information
- Maintained by NDOT
- Length: 14.252 mi (22.936 km)
- Existed: July 1, 1976–present

Major junctions
- West end: Twilight Run Drive / Park Drift Trail in Las Vegas
- Future I-215 / CC 215 in Las Vegas; I-11 / US 95 in Las Vegas; US 95 Bus. / SR 599 at Las Vegas–North Las Vegas line; I-15 / US 93 in North Las Vegas; SR 612 in Sunrise Manor
- East end: Lake Mead National Recreation Area

SR 147 (Western segment)
- West end: Losee Road in North Las Vegas
- Major intersections: I-15 / US 93
- East end: Yale Street in North Las Vegas

SR 147 (Eastern segment)
- West end: Pecos Road at the North Las Vegas–Sunrise Manor line
- Major intersections: SR 612 in Sunrise Manor
- East end: Lake Mead National Recreation Area

Location
- Country: United States
- State: Nevada
- County: Clark

Highway system
- Nevada State Highway System; Interstate; US; State; Pre‑1976; Scenic
← SR 146	→ SR 156

Lake Mead Boulevard is a major arterial road serving the Las Vegas Valley in southern Nevada. It runs from Twilight Run Drive and Park Drift Trail in Summerlin West to the Lake Mead National Recreation Area. Two portions of Lake Mead Boulevard are designated as unsigned State Route 147 (SR 147). The western segment runs from Interstate 15 (I-15) and U.S. 93 to Yale Street (both in North Las Vegas). The eastern segment runs from Pecos Road (at the North Las Vegas–Sunrise Manor boundary) to the border of the Lake Mead National Recreation Area. It is not to be confused with Lake Mead Parkway (SR 564, formerly Lake Mead Drive), which also goes to Lake Mead but mainly runs through Henderson instead.

Lake Mead Boulevard became a state highway in 1978, but the highway never had markers posted to identify it as a state highway.

== Route description ==
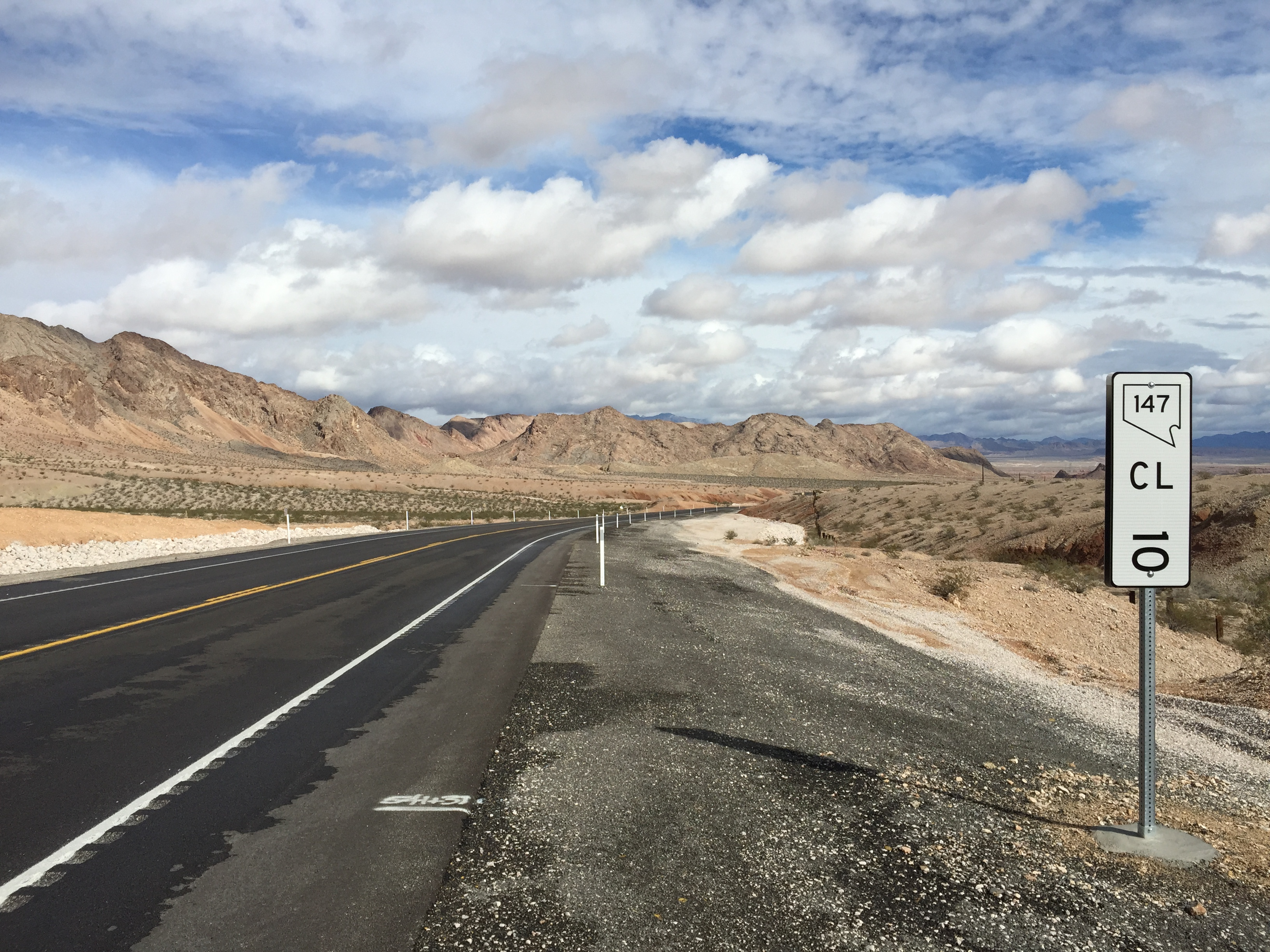
View eastbound along SR 147 at milepost 10 as seen in 2015

State Route 147 begins at Interstate 15 and U.S. Route 93 in North Las Vegas. From there, SR 147 has an intersection at Las Vegas Boulevard (SR 604) and Civic Center Drive (former SR 607). Traveling further east, SR 147 leaves the city of North Las Vegas as it enters the unincorporated town of Sunrise Manor where it has intersections at Lamb Boulevard and Nellis Boulevard (SR 612). The highway then leaves the unincorporated town of Sunrise Manor as it travels through the Frenchman Mountain on its northern slope. The road then curves into a southeastern direction where the highway ends near the Lake Mead NRA as Lake Mead Boulevard continues beyond the highway's eastern terminus.

== History ==
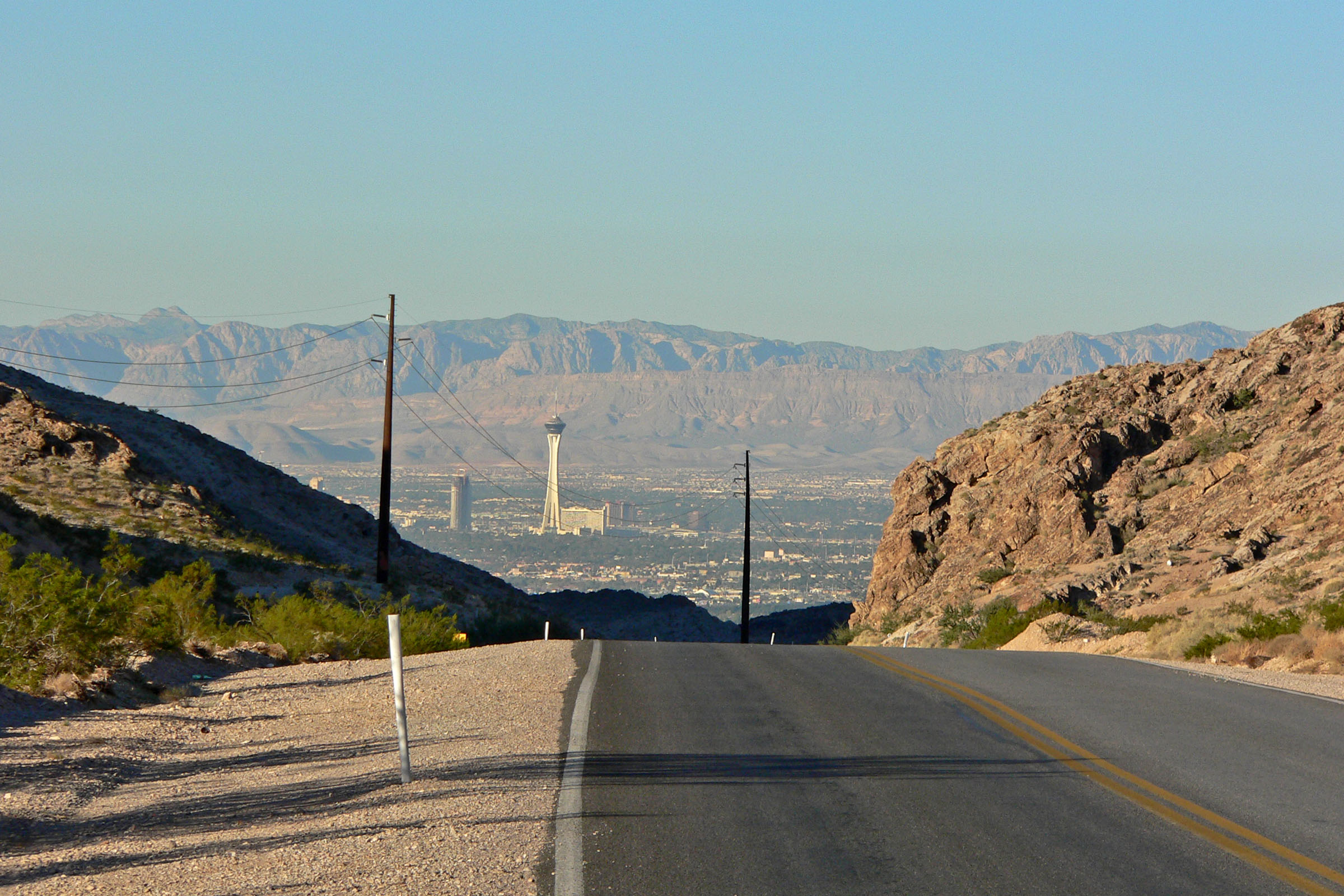
Las Vegas seen from where SR 147 passes over the north shoulder of Frenchman Mountain as seen in 2006

SR 147 first appeared on the official Nevada state highway map in the 1978–79 edition as a semi-circular route. The route followed Lake Mead Boulevard (which was previously unnumbered) eastward from I-15 in North Las Vegas to North Shore Road in the Lake Mead National Recreation Area. It then turned south onto North Shore Road (replacing SR4 1A), then west toward Lakeshore Road (later Lake Mead Drive, now Lake Mead Parkway), replacing part of SR 41. The terminus was at Lakeshore Road and Boulder Highway (then US 93/US 95, formerly SR 582). The highway continued west of Boulder Highway as SR 146.

The northern section along Lake Mead Boulevard la"cks the "SR 147 designation on the 1983–84 and 1985–86 maps. However, it is back on the 1987–88 map, so it is unclear whether this was a map error or possibly a planned decommissioning that was not carried out.

On the 1998–99 map, the southern section of SR 147 (along Lake Mead Drive) was replaced by an eastward extension of SR 146 (now SR 564). The entire length of SR 147 is now on Lake Mead Boulevard, with the eastern terminus truncated to the northern border of the Lake Mead National Recreation Area.

Sometime between 1999 and 2025, SR 147 was shrunken even further: the segment between Yale Street and Pecos Road was removed from the state highway.

== Major intersections ==
The entire route is in Clark County.

Location	mi	km	Destinations	Notes
Las Vegas	0.0	0.0	Twilight Run Drive west	Continuation beyond western terminus
Las Vegas	0.0	0.0	Park Drift Trail	Western terminus
Las Vegas	0.3	0.48	Sunset Run Drive	
Las Vegas	1.1	1.8	Park Drift Trail south	Northeastern terminus of Park Drift Trail
Las Vegas	1.5	2.4	Desert Foothills Drive south / Reverence Parkway north	
Las Vegas	1.7– 1.8	2.7– 2.9	Future I-215 / CC 215	Single-point urban interchange; CC 215 exit 29
Las Vegas	2.2	3.5	Thomas W. Ryan Boulevard	
Las Vegas	3.0	4.8	Anasazi Drive south / Sun City Boulevard north	
Las Vegas	4.1	6.6	Hills Center Drive south / Del Webb Boulevard east	
Las Vegas	5.2	8.4	Rampart Boulevard	
Las Vegas	6.5	10.5	Buffalo Drive	
Las Vegas	7.0	11.3	Tenaya Way	
Las Vegas	7.30– 7.38	11.75– 11.88	I-11 south / US 95 south / Rock Springs Drive	Access from I-11 / US 95 SB to Lake Mead Boulevard is via Rock Springs Drive; I-11/US 95 SB exit 82
Las Vegas	7.50– 7.58	12.07– 12.20	I-11 north / US 95 north / Rainbow Boulevard	I-11/US 95 north exits 82A (eastbound) and 82B (westbound); access from I-11/US 95 NB to Lake Mead Blvd WB is via Rainbow Blvd South
Las Vegas	8.0	12.9	Torrey Pines Drive	
Las Vegas	8.6	13.8	Jones Boulevard	Former SR 596
Las Vegas	9.0	14.5	Michael Way	
Las Vegas	9.6	15.4	Decatur Boulevard	
Las Vegas–North Las Vegas line	10.2	16.4	SR 599 / US 95 Bus. (Rancho Drive)	
North Las Vegas	11.2	18.0	Simmons Street	
Las Vegas	12.3	19.8	Martin L. King Boulevard	
Las Vegas–North Las Vegas line	13.3	21.4	Losee Road	Western terminus of unsigned SR 147
North Las Vegas	13.4– 13.5	21.6– 21.7	I-15 / US 93 – Los Angeles, Salt Lake City	Interchange; I-15 exit 45; Lake Mead Boulevard changes signage from "West Lake Mead Boulevard" to "East Lake Mead Boulevard"
North Las Vegas	13.4– 13.5	21.6– 21.7	I-15 / US 93 – Los Angeles, Salt Lake City	Begin one-way pair: Eastbound direction is "Lake Mead Boulevard South," while westbound direction is "Lake Mead Boulevard North"
North Las Vegas	13.6	21.9	Yale Street	Eastern terminus of western segment of unsigned SR 147
North Las Vegas	13.7	22.0	5th Street	
North Las Vegas	14.0	22.5	Las Vegas Boulevard	Former SR 604/US 91/US 93; End of one-way pair
North Las Vegas	14.7	23.7	Civic Center Drive	Former SR 607
North Las Vegas–Sunrise Manor line	15.7	25.3	Pecos Road	Western terminus of eastern segment of unsigned SR 147
Sunrise Manor	16.8	27.0	Lamb Boulevard	
Sunrise Manor	17.8	28.6	SR 612 (Nellis Boulevard)	
Sunrise Manor	19.8	31.9	Hollywood Boulevard	
Lake Mead National Recreation Area	27.5	44.3	3 miles (4.8 kilometers) north of the Entrance Fee Station	Eastern terminus of unsigned SR 147
Lake Mead National Recreation Area	30.5	49.1	Northshore Road	Former SR 167; eastern terminus
1.000 mi = 1.609 km; 1.000 km = 0.621 mi: Concurrency terminus; Route transition

== Public transport ==
RTC Transit Route 210 functions on this road.
