= List of state routes in Nevada =

State routes in Nevada
- Standard route markers for State Route 28 and State Route 318

System information
- Maintained by NDOT
- Formed: 1917 (current numbering in 1976)
- State: State Route X (SR X)

System links
- Nevada State Highway System; Interstate; US; State; Pre‑1976; Scenic

The following is a list of all State Routes that have existed in the U.S. state of Nevada since July 1, 1976. All active state-numbered highways in this list are maintained by the Nevada Department of Transportation.

== Primary routes (0–499) ==
Primary state routes are assigned three-digit numbers based upon the county in which the majority of the route resides (or, in some instances, the county of the major town on the route). State routes in a county are grouped together with similar numbers, which are assigned in order based upon alphabetical order of county names. SR 28, SR 88 and SR 140 are the three exceptions to this numbering scheme—all three are highways that continue into an adjoining state, making SR 28 and SR 88 the only state highways assigned a two-digit number.

Number	Length (mi)	Length (km)	Southern or western terminus	Northern or eastern terminus	Local names	Formed	Removed	Notes
SR 28	16.116	25.936	US 50 near Glenbrook	California state line on CA 28 towards Kings Beach, Calif.		1948	current	
SR 34	—	—	CR 447 in Gerlach	Coleman Valley Road		—	1978	
SR 88	7.868	12.662	California state line on CA 88 towards Woodfords, Calif.	US 395 in Minden		1957	current	
SR 115	4.822	7.760	SR 119 in southern Fallon	Stillwater Avenue in Fallon		1976	current	
SR 116	10.488	16.879	US 50 east of Fallon	Stillwater		1976	current	
SR 117	6.914	11.127	US 50 in western Fallon	US 95 in Fallon		1976	current	
SR 118	3.475	5.592	SR 115 in Fallon	Wildes Road near NAS Fallon in Fallon		1976	current	
SR 119	4.137	6.658	US 95 in southern Fallon	Beach Road at NAS Fallon gate in southeastern Fallon		1976	current	
SR 120	6.260	10.074	US 95 in southern Fallon	SR 119 in southeastern Fallon		1976	current	
SR 121	27.047	43.528	US 50 southeast of Fallon	Settlement Road in Dixie Valley		1976	c. 2022	Now designated as a frontage road (FR CH08)
SR 140	110.113	177.210	Oregon state line on OR 140 towards Adel, Ore.	US 95 south of Orovada		c. 1968	current	Briefly designated SR 291 after 1976
SR 142	—	—	—	—		1976	c. 1981	Now US 604
SR 144	3.132	5.040	I-15 in Mesquite (at exit 120)	I-15 in Mesquite (at exit 122)		1976	c. 2005	
SR 146	6.673	10.739	I-15 south of Las Vegas	I-215 in Henderson	Saint Rose Parkway	1976	current	
SR 147	14.252	22.936	I-15 in North Las Vegas	Lake Mead Nat'l Rec Area boundary east of North Las Vegas	Lake Mead Boulevard	1976	current	
SR 153	—	—	—	—		1976	c. 1983	Now SR 595
SR 156	16.954	27.285	Lee Canyon	US 95 northwest of Las Vegas	Lee Canyon Road	1976	current	
SR 157	21.428	34.485	Kyle Canyon near Mt. Charleston	I-11/US 95 in northwest Las Vegas	Kyle Canyon Road	1976	current	
SR 158	8.882	14.294	SR 157 in Mount Charleston	SR 156 in Lee Canyon	Deer Creek Road	1976	current	
SR 159	31.204	50.218	SR 160 south of Blue Diamond	SR 612 in Las Vegas	Blue Diamond Road; Red Rock Canyon Road; Charleston Boulevard	1976	current	
SR 160	80.326	129.272	US 95 north of Pahrump	Las Vegas Boulevard in southern Las Vegas	Pahrump Valley Highway; Blue Diamond Road	1976	current	
SR 161	7.290	11.732	Esmeralda Street in Goodsprings	I-15 in Jean		1976	current	
SR 162	—	—	—	—	Needles Highway	1976	c. 1982	Originally followed a now-impassable route
SR 163	19.207	30.911	US 95 south of Cal-Nev-Ari	AZ 95 toward Bullhead City, Ariz.		1976	current	
SR 164	18.584	29.908	Calif. state line on Nipton Road towards Nipton, Calif.	US 95 in Searchlight		1976	current	
SR 165	11.002	17.706	Nelson	US 95 south of Boulder City		1976	current	
SR 166	—	—	US 93 northeast of Boulder City	SR 147 / SR 564 east of Henderson	Lakeshore Road	1976	c. 2000	
SR 167	—	—	SR 147 east of Las Vegas	SR 169 south of Overton	Northshore Road	1976	c. 2000	
SR 168	24.775	39.871	US 93 northwest of Moapa	I-15 in Glendale		1976	current	
SR 169	18.486	29.750	Lake Mead Nat'l Rec. Area boundary south of Overton	I-15 north of Logandale		1976	current	
SR 170	12.268	19.743	I-15 north of Riverside	Mesquite Boulevard in Mesquite	Riverside Road	1976	current	
SR 171	0.639	1.028	I-215 in Las Vegas	SR 562 / Harry Reid International Airport tunnel in Paradise		1994	current	Unsigned
SR 172	1.351	2.174	US 93 northeast of Boulder City	Hoover Dam access road west of Hoover Dam	Hoover Dam Access Road	2010	current	Former US 93
SR 173	1.075	1.730	I-11 in Boulder City	US 93 Bus. in Boulder City	Veterans Memorial Highway	2018	current	
SR 206	15.435	24.840	SR 88 south of Gardnerville	US 395 north of Minden		1976	current	
SR 207	11.082	17.835	US 50 in Stateline	SR 206 west of Gardnerville		1976	current	
SR 208	37.881	60.964	US 395 north of Topaz Lake	US 95 Alt. in Yerington		1976	current	
SR 221	2.977	4.791	SR 278 in Carlin	I-80 in Carlin		1976	current	
SR 223	2.010	3.235	SR 231 in Wells	US 93 in Wells		1976	current	
SR 224	0.6	0.97	US 93 Alt. in West Wendover	Utah state line on UT 58 in Wendover, Utah		1976	1993	
SR 225	100.301	161.419	SR 535 in Elko	Idaho state line on ID 51 in Owyhee		1976	current	
SR 226	39.017	62.792	Deep Creek	SR 225 north of Elko		1976	current	
SR 227	20.134	32.403	SR 535 in Elko	Crossroads Lane in Lamoille		1976	current	
SR 228	26.814	43.153	Jiggs	SR 227 southeast of Elko		1976	current	
SR 229	50.360	81.047	I-80 at Halleck	US 93 south of Wells		1976	current	
SR 230	13.085	21.058	I-80 in Deeth	I-80 at Welcome		1976	current	
SR 231	11.600	18.668	Angel Lake	SR 223 in Wells		1976	current	
SR 232	14.531	23.385	south of Steele Creek	US 93 south of Wells		1976	current	
SR 233	34.234	55.094	I-80 at Oasis	Utah state line on UT 30 towards Rosette, Utah		1976	current	
SR 264	33.667	54.182	California state line on CA 266 towards Oasis, CA	US 6 east of Basalt		1976	current	
SR 265	20.500	32.992	Silver Peak Road in Silver Peak	US 6 / US 95 east of Coaldale		1976	current	
SR 266	40.338	64.918	California state line on CA 266 towards Oasis, CA	US 95 south of Goldfield		1976	current	
SR 267	21.427	34.483	California state line towards Scotty's Castle	US 95 northwest of Beatty		1976	current	
SR 278	87.630	141.027	US 50 north of Eureka	I-80 in Carlin		1976	current	
SR 289	1.637	2.634	US 95 in Winnemucca	SR 795 in northern Winnemucca		1976	current	
SR 290	18.012	28.988	US 95 north of Winnemucca	Bridge Street in Paradise Valley		1976	current	
SR 291	110.113	177.210	Oregon state line on OR 140 towards Adel, Ore.	US 95 south of Orovada		1976	c. 1980	former SR 140, changed back to SR 140
SR 292	2.935	4.723	SR 140 at Denio Junction	Oregon state line in Denio		1976	current	
SR 293	23.989	38.607	Kings River Valley	US 95 in Orovada		1976	current	
SR 294	7.973	12.831	Pershing County county line on Grass Valley Road	SR 794 in Winnemucca		1981	current	
SR 304	3.788	6.096	I-80 in Battle Mountain	I-80 in Battle Mountain		1976	current	
SR 305	87.717	141.167	US 50 in Austin	SR 304 in Battle Mountain		1976	current	
SR 306	30.631	49.296	Barrack Gold Mine east of Gold Acres	I-80 north of Beowawe		1976	current	
SR 317	21.490	34.585	Elgin	US 93 in Caliente		1976	current	
SR 318	110.762	178.254	US 93 at Crystal Springs	US 6 northwest of Preston		1976	current	
SR 319	20.914	33.658	US 93 west of Panaca	Utah state line on UT 56 towards Modena, Utah		1976	current	
SR 320	10.674	17.178	US 93 south of Pioche	US 93 north of Pioche		1976	current	
SR 321	5.113	8.229	US 93 south of Pioche	US 93 north of Pioche		1976	current	
SR 322	18.578	29.898	SR 321 in Pioche	Spring Valley State Park		1976	current	
SR 338	30.896	49.722	California state line on CA 182 towards Bridgeport, Calif.	SR 208 in Smith Valley		1976	current	
SR 339	11.523	18.544	SR 208 near Wilson Canyon	US 95 Alt. in Yerington		1976	current	
SR 340	1.080	1.738	SR 339 in western Yerington	SR 208 in Yerington		1976	current	
SR 341	22.034	35.460	US 50 west of Dayton	US 395 Alt. / SR 431 in Reno		1976	current	
SR 342	3.780	6.083	SR 341 near Silver City	SR 341 in Virginia City		1976	current	
SR 359	33.350	53.672	California state line on CA 167 towards Lee Vining, Calif.	US 95 in Hawthorne		1976	current	
SR 360	23.245	37.409	US 6 at Basalt	US 95 south of Mina		1976	current	
SR 361	62.853	101.152	US 95 in Luning	US 50 at Middlegate		1976	current	
SR 362	1.297	2.087	US 95 in eastern Hawthorne	US 95 in Hawthorne		1976	current	Signed as US 95 Truck
SR 372	7.770	12.505	California state line on CA 178 towards Shoshone, Calif.	SR 160 in Pahrump		1976	current	
SR 373	16.304	26.239	California state line on CA 127 towards Death Valley Junction, Calif.	US 95 in Amargosa Valley		1976	current	
SR 374	8.840	14.227	Death Valley Nat'l Park boundary southwest of Beatty	US 95 in Beatty		1976	current	
SR 375	98.414	158.382	SR 318 at Crystal Springs	US 6 at Warm Springs		1976	current	
SR 376	99.810	160.629	US 6 east of Tonopah	US 50 southeast of Austin		1976	current	
SR 377	6.597	10.617	SR 376 west of Manhattan	Main Street in Manhattan		1976	current	
SR 378	2.7	4.3	SR 376 west of Round Mountain	Main Street in Round Mountain		1976	c. 1999	
SR 379	19.532	31.434	US 6 in Currant	Duckwater		1976	current	
SR 396	7.701	12.394	I-80 in Lovelock	I-80 northeast of Lovelock		1976	current	
SR 397	11.840	19.055	SR 860 southwest of Lovelock	SR 398 in Lovelock		1976	current	
SR 398	4.767	7.672	I-80 / US 95 in Lovelock	SR 396 northeast of Lovelock		1976	current	
SR 399	18.184	29.264	Eagle Picher Mine northwest of Lovelock	SR 398 in Lovelock		1976	current	
SR 400	16.582	26.686	Kyle Hot Springs Road east of Unionville	I-80 / US 95 at Mill City		1976	current	
SR 401	2.347	3.777	Rye Patch State Rec. Area	I-80 / US 95 northeast of Lovelock		1976	current	
SR 425	3.437	5.531	Gold Ranch Road in Verdi	I-80 in Verdi		1976	current	
SR 426	0.370	0.595	US 395 Alt. in Reno	I-580 / US 395 in Reno		1976	current	
SR 427	4.700	7.564	I-80 southwest of Wadsworth	US 50 Alt. / US 95 Alt. in Fernley		1976	current	
SR 428	11	18	US 395 north of Carson City	US 395 north of Washoe City		1976	c. 1983	
SR 429	7.824	12.592	Hobart Road north of Carson City	US 395 in Washoe City		1976	2012	
SR 430	3.161	5.087	US 659 in Reno	US 395 in Reno		1976	current	
SR 431	24.413	39.289	SR 28 in Incline Village	US 395 Alt. & SR 341 in Reno		1976	current	
SR 439	18.5	29.8	US 50 in Silver Springs	I-80 east of Sparks		2015	current	
SR 442	—	—	—	—		1976	c. 1981	Sullivan Avenue
SR 443	3.197	5.145	US 659 in Reno	7th Avenue in Sun Valley		1976	current	
SR 445	41.890	67.415	Nugget Avenue in Sparks	Warrior Point Park Road north of Sutcliffe		1976	current	
SR 446	13.156	21.173	SR 445 southeast of Sutcliffe	SR 447 in Nixon		1976	current	
SR 447	74.645	120.129	SR 427 in Wadsworth	Washoe County Route 447 in Gerlach		1976	current	
SR 485	2	3.2	Ruth	US 50 west of Ely		1976	c. 1983	
SR 486	33	53	US 6 / US 50 / US 93 southeast of Ely	US 93 north of Ely		1976	c. 1983	
SR 487	11.025	17.743	Utah state line on UT 21 towards Milford, Utah	US 6 / US 50 northwest of Baker		1976	current	
SR 488	4.786	7.702	Great Basin Nat'l Park	SR 487 in Baker		1976	current	
SR 489	8.2	13.2	Cherry Creek	US 93 north of Ely		1976	c. 1978	
SR 490	8.931	14.373	Ely State Prison	US 93 northeast of Ely		1976	current	
Former

== Urban routes (500–699) ==
Urban state routes, numbered in the 500s and 600s, typically lie on arterial roadways in larger metropolitan areas. Urban state routes are grouped together sequentially, assigned by alphabetical order of the name of the city in which they primarily reside.

Nevada DOT has been attempting to remove some urban routes from the state highway system since the 1990s, preferring to transfer control of these roadways to local municipalities. This is especially apparent in Carson City, where all of the city's state routes have been gradually removed since 2011.

Number	Length (mi)	Length (km)	Southern or western terminus	Northern or eastern terminus	Local names	Formed	Removed	Notes
SR 500	2.25	3.62	US 93 in Boulder City	US 93 northeast of Boulder City		1976	c. 1982	
SR 501	—	—	—	—		1976	c. 1982	
SR 511	0.808	1.300	Ormsby Boulevard in Carson City	North Carson Street in Carson City		c. 1983	c. 2009	
SR 512	2.282	3.673	Kings Creek in Carson City	South Carson Street in Carson City		c. 1983	c. 2009	
SR 513	2.185	3.516	South Carson Street in Carson City	Fairview Drive in Carson City		1976	2011	
SR 516	2.452	3.946	West King Street in Carson City	North Carson Street in Carson City		1983	c. 2009	
SR 518	1.014	1.632	US 50 / US 395 in Carson City	Jacobsen Way in Carson City		1976	2018	
SR 520	1.227	1.975	South Carson Street in Carson City	East William Street in Carson City		1976	2010	
SR 525	1.323	2.129	Lompa Lane in Carson City	US 50 in Carson City		1976	2011	
SR 529	1.987	3.198	US 50 / US 395 south of Carson City	Fairview Drive in Carson City		1994	2018	Final length in 2018
SR 530	1.464	2.356	Carson Street in Carson City	Lompa Lane in Carson City		1994	2010	
SR 531	1.645	2.647	N. Carson Street in Carson City	Lompa Lane in Carson City		1995	2011	
SR 535	3.192	5.137	I-80 west of Elko	SR 227 in Elko		1976	current	
SR 562	4.775	7.685	Las Vegas Boulevard in Las Vegas	Annie Oakley Drive at Paradise–Henderson line	Sunset Road	1976	current	
SR 564	8.406	13.528	I-215 west / I-11 / US 93 / US 95 in Henderson	Lake Mead Nat'l Rec. Area boundary east of Henderson	Lake Mead Parkway	2002	current	Formerly SR 46, SR 146, and SR 147
SR 573	5.408	8.703	I-11 / US 95 in Las Vegas	SR 604 in North Las Vegas near Nellis Air Force Base	Craig Road	1976	current	Route has two sections
SR 574	8.355	13.446	I-11 / US 95 in Las Vegas	SR 612 in North Las Vegas	Cheyenne Avenue	1976	current	Route has two sections
SR 578	0.657	1.057	I-15 in Las Vegas	Las Vegas Boulevard in Las Vegas	Washington Avenue	1976	current	unsigned
SR 579	2.209	3.555	US 95 Bus. / SR 599 in Las Vegas	Las Vegas Boulevard in Las Vegas	Bonanza Road	1976	current	former US 95 / SR 5
SR 582	7.758	12.485	I-11 / US 93 / US 95 in Henderson	Charleston Boulevard in Las Vegas	Fremont Street; Boulder Highway; Wagon Wheel Drive	1991	current	former US 93 / US 95 / US 466 / SR 5; route has two sections
SR 587	5.4	8.7	I-515 in Las Vegas	Redondo Avenue in Las Vegas		1976	c. 2001	Became part of SR 159
SR 589	0.471	0.758	Rancho Drive in Las Vegas	Northbridge Lane in Las Vegas	Sahara Avenue	1976	current	
SR 591	0.242	0.389	Aldebaran Drive in Las Vegas	Highland Drive in Las Vegas	Spring Mountain Road	1976	c. 2008	Now maintained as unsigned Frontage Road 51 (FR CL 51)
SR 592	8.471	13.633	SR 595 in Las Vegas	SR 582 in Las Vegas	Flamingo Road	1997	current	Route has two sections
SR 593	4.893	7.875	Dean Martin Drive in Las Vegas	SR 582 in Las Vegas	Tropicana Avenue	1976	current	Route has two sections
SR 594	0.723	1.164	Polaris Avenue in Las Vegas	Las Vegas Boulevard in Las Vegas	Russell Road	1976	c. 2019	
SR 595	5.656	9.102	Tropicana Avenue in Las Vegas	Washington Avenue in Las Vegas	Rainbow Boulevard	1976	current	
SR 596	4.119	6.629	Sahara Avenue in Las Vegas	US 95 Bus. / SR 599 in Las Vegas	Jones Boulevard	1976	current	Route has two sections
SR 599	6.788	10.924	Mesquite Avenue in Las Vegas	0.171 mi (0.275 km) north of Rainbow Boulevard at I-11 / US 95 exit 91B in Las Vegas	Rancho Drive	1976	current	Also designated as unsigned US 95 Business
SR 601	3.2	5.1	South Las Vegas Boulevard / Saint Louis Avenue east in Las Vegas	North Las Vegas Boulevard / North 5th Street north in North Las Vegas	Main Street	1976	c. 2005	Southbound direction is known as "Commerce Street" from about halfway between Garces Avenue and Gass Avenue to Oakey Boulevard
SR 602	0.179	0.288	Stewart Avenue in Las Vegas	Bonanza Road in Las Vegas	Casino Center Boulevard	1976	current	
SR 604	12.007	19.323	Carey Avenue in North Las Vegas	I-15 / US 93 at Apex	Las Vegas Boulevard	1976	current	Former US 91/US 93
SR 605	2.977	4.791	Tropicana Avenue in Paradise	Sahara Avenue in Las Vegas	Paradise Road	1976	c. 2001	
SR 606	1.0	1.6	Sahara Avenue in Las Vegas	Charleston Boulevard in Las Vegas	Maryland Parkway	1976	c. 2001	
SR 607	5.237	8.428	Sahara Avenue in Las Vegas	SR 573 in North Las Vegas	Eastern Avenue; Civic Center Drive	1976	c. 2006	
SR 610	2.370	3.814	SR 604 in Las Vegas	I-15 / US 93 in North Las Vegas	Lamb Boulevard	1976	current	
SR 612	9.400	15.128	SR 593 in Las Vegas	SR 573 in Las Vegas	Nellis Boulevard	1976	current	
SR 613	5.513	8.872	Future I-215 / CC 215 in Las Vegas	I-11 / US 95 in Las Vegas	Summerlin Parkway	c. 2019	current	
SR 646	0.090	0.145	0.090 miles west of McCarran Boulevard in Sparks	McCarran Boulevard in Sparks		1976	2010	
SR 647	3.397	5.467	I-80 west of Reno	I-80 in Sparks		1976	current	Route has two sections
SR 648	2.657	4.276	SR 667 in Reno	SR 659 in Sparks		1976	current	
SR 650	6.365	10.243	Equity Avenue in Reno	US 395 in northern Reno		1976	2009	Absorbed into SR 659 in 2009
SR 651	6.630	10.670	West 4th Street in Reno	US 395 in northern Reno		1976	2009	Absorbed into SR 659 in 2009
SR 653	0.589	0.948	SR 667 in Reno	Terminal Way in Reno		1976	current	
SR 655	—	—	—	—		1976	1982	Peckham Lane in Reno
SR 655	1.142	1.838	—	—		1986	current	Unsigned
SR 657	0.180	0.290	0.18 mi south of McCarran Boulevard in Reno	McCarran Boulevard in Reno		1976	c. 2008	
SR 659	22.972	36.970	Belt route through Reno–Sparks			2009	current	
SR 660	0.055	0.089	Maple Street in Reno	8th Street in Reno		1976	2011	
SR 663	2.491	4.009	Sutro Street in Reno	SR 445 in Sparks		1976	2010	
SR 666	—	—	—	—		c. 1982	1983	Former SR 443, changed back to SR 443
SR 667	3.836	6.173	South Virginia Street in Reno	Victorian Avenue in Sparks		1976	current	
SR 668	0.314	0.505	Hymer Avenue in Sparks	Victorian Avenue in Sparks		1976	current	
SR 671	3.426	5.514	US 395 Alt. in Reno	Del Monte Lane in Reno		1983	current	
SR 673	0.395	0.636	North Virginia Street north of Reno	US 395 north of Reno		1983	current	
SR 686	0.105	0.169	Enterprise Road in Reno	McCarran Boulevard in Reno		1976	c. 2006	
Former

== Secondary routes (700–895) ==
Minor state routes, numbered in the 700s and 800s, chiefly exist to connect smaller rural communities to other state highways. In some small urban areas, these routes can also serve as minor collector or arterial roadways.

Like primary state routes, minor state routes are grouped sequentially in alphabetical order by county name.

Number	Length (mi)	Length (km)	Southern or western terminus	Northern or eastern terminus	Formed	Removed	Notes
SR 705	0.928	1.493	Clear Creek Road south of Carson City	Clear Creek Road south of Carson City	1976	current	
SR 706	—	—	—	—	—	—	absorbed into SR 513
SR 715	2.135	3.436	SR 117 southwest of Fallon	US 50 west of Fallon	1976	current	
SR 718	2.903	4.672	Curry Road south of Fallon	US 95 south of Fallon	1976	current	
SR 720	3.248	5.227	US 95 south of Fallon	Pasture Road south of Fallon	1976	current	
SR 722	58.139	93.566	US 50 near Middlegate	US 50 near Austin	1976	current	former US 50
SR 723	2.008	3.232	US 50 west of Fallon	Cox Road northwest of Fallon	1976	current	
SR 726	1.866	3.003	US 95 north of Fallon	Old River Road north of Fallon	1976	current	
SR 739	0.218	0.351	I-15 south of Las Vegas	Las Vegas Boulevard south of Las Vegas	1976	2010	
SR 756	3.974	6.396	SR 88 near Centerville	US 395 in Gardnerville	1976	current	
SR 757	3.182	5.121	SR 206 south of Genoa	US 395 north of Minden	1976	current	
SR 758	—	—	SR 206 near Genoa	US 395 north of Minden	1976	1995	Absorbed into SR 206 by 1995
SR 759	1.004	1.616	US 395 north of Minden	Heybourne Road north of Minden	1976	current	
SR 760	0.475	0.764	Nevada Beach on Lake Tahoe	US 50 near Zephyr Cove	1976	current	
SR 765	—	—	—	—	1976	1995	
SR 766	11.507	18.519	SR 221 in Carlin	Newmont Mine Road northwest of Carlin	1976	current	
SR 767	1.924	3.096	Ruby Valley Road north of Ruby Valley	SR 229 southeast of Halleck	1976	current	
SR 773	10.496	16.892	SR 264 in Fish Lake Valley	US 6 west of Coaldale	1976	current	
SR 774	7.455	11.998	3rd Street in Gold Point	SR 266 east of Lida	1976	current	
SR 780	2.270	3.653	Richmond-Eureka Mine	US 50 in Eureka	1976	2012	
SR 781	0.039	0.063	Palisade bridge southwest of Carlin	Palisade bridge southwest of Carlin	1976	current	
SR 786	—	—	Business I-80 in Winnemucca	SR 294 in Winnemucca	1976	c. 2002	Absorbed by SR 294 on May 1, 1997
SR 787	0.497	0.800	US 95 in Winnemucca	SR 294 in Winnemucca	1997	current	
SR 789	16.249	26.150	I-80 in Golconda	Midas Road north of Golconda	1976	current	
SR 790	—	—	SR 789 in Golconda	Stanford Street in Golconda	1976	1997	Now Morrison Avenue
SR 794	2.438	3.924	SR 294 in Winnemucca	I-80 east of Winnemucca	1981	current	
SR 795	1.245	2.004	US 95 north of Winnemucca	SR 289 north of Winnemucca	1999	current	
SR 796	1.364	2.195	Winnemucca Airport southwest of Winnemucca	I-80 Frontage Road west of Winnemucca	1997	current	
SR 805	—	—	—	—	—	—	absorbed into SR 306
SR 806	5.812	9.354	SR 304 in Battle Mountain	Reese Road north of Battle Mountain	1976	current	
SR 816	0.610	0.982	County Airport Road west of Panaca	US 93 west of Panaca	1976	current	
SR 822	0.146	0.235	US 50 in Dayton	Ricci Road in Dayton	1976	current	
SR 823	7.614	12.254	SR 208 near Wellington	Upper Colony Road at Simpson	1976	current	
SR 824	5.573	8.969	SR 208 at Smith	SR 823 near Simpson	1976	current	
SR 825	0.415	0.668	West of Day Lane near Smith	SR 824 at Smith	1976	current	
SR 827	5.796	9.328	SR 339 at Mason	East Purcell Lane southeast of Yerington	1976	current	
SR 828	7.736	12.450	US 50 Alt. / US 95 Alt. / I-80 Bus. in Fernley	US 50 Alt. east of Fernley	1976	current	
SR 829	3.167	5.097	SR 338 southeast of Wellington	SR 208 in Wellington	1976	current	
SR 839	18.073	29.086	Rawhide Road	US 50 southeast of Fallon	1976	current	
SR 844	12.319	19.826	SR 361 north of Gabbs	Humboldt-Toiyabe National Forest east of Gabbs	1976	current	
SR 854	4.120	6.630	SR 399 northwest of Lovelock	SR 398 in Lovelock	1976	current	
SR 856	1.398	2.250	SR 396 in Lovelock	Reservoir Road east of Lovelock	1976	current	
SR 858	0.546	0.879	I-80 / US 95 northeast of Oreana	I-80 frontage road	1976	2013	
SR 859	0.331	0.533	I-80 at Imlay	Imlay	1976	c. 2001	
SR 860	1.888	3.038	Derby Field southwest of Lovelock	Old US 40 (I-80 frontage road) southwest of Lovelock	1976	current	
SR 877	4.296	6.914	US 395 Alt. in Washoe Valley	US 395 Alt. south of Washoe City	1976	current	
SR 878	1.022	1.645	Mount Rose	SR 431 near Incline Village	1976	current	
SR 880	0.621	0.999	Malapai Way in Sparks	SR 445 in Sparks	1976	current	
SR 892	35.919	57.806	US 50 southeast of Eureka	Strawberry Road north of Strawberry	1976	current	
SR 893	39.753	63.976	US 6 / US 50 east of Lages Station	Spring Valley Road at Muncy Creek	1976	current	
SR 894	16.617	26.742	Shoshone Road in Shoshone	US 93 south of Lages Station	1976	current	
SR 895	1.481	2.383	Preston	SR 318 north of Preston	1976	current	
Former

== See also ==
- List of state routes in Nevada prior to 1976
- List of Interstate Highways in Nevada
- List of U.S. Routes in Nevada
- Nevada Scenic Byways
