= Nevada State Route 612 =

Highway in Nevada

State Route 612
- Nellis Boulevard
- SR 612 highlighted in red

Route information
- Maintained by NDOT
- Length: 9.400 mi (15.128 km)
- Existed: July 1, 1976–present

Major junctions
- South end: SR 593 at Paradise–Whitney line
- SR 582 at Paradise–Sunrise Manor line; SR 159 west at Las Vegas–Sunrise Manor line; SR 147 in Sunrise Manor; SR 574 west at Sunrise Manor line
- North end: SR 604 in Sunrise Manor

Location
- Country: United States
- State: Nevada
- County: Clark

Highway system
- Nevada State Highway System; Interstate; US; State; Pre‑1976; Scenic
← SR 610	→ SR 613

State Route 612 (SR 612) is a state highway in Clark County, Nevada. It comprises about 9.4 miles (15.1 km) of the major north–south section line arterial Nellis Boulevard in the eastern Las Vegas Valley.

== Route description ==
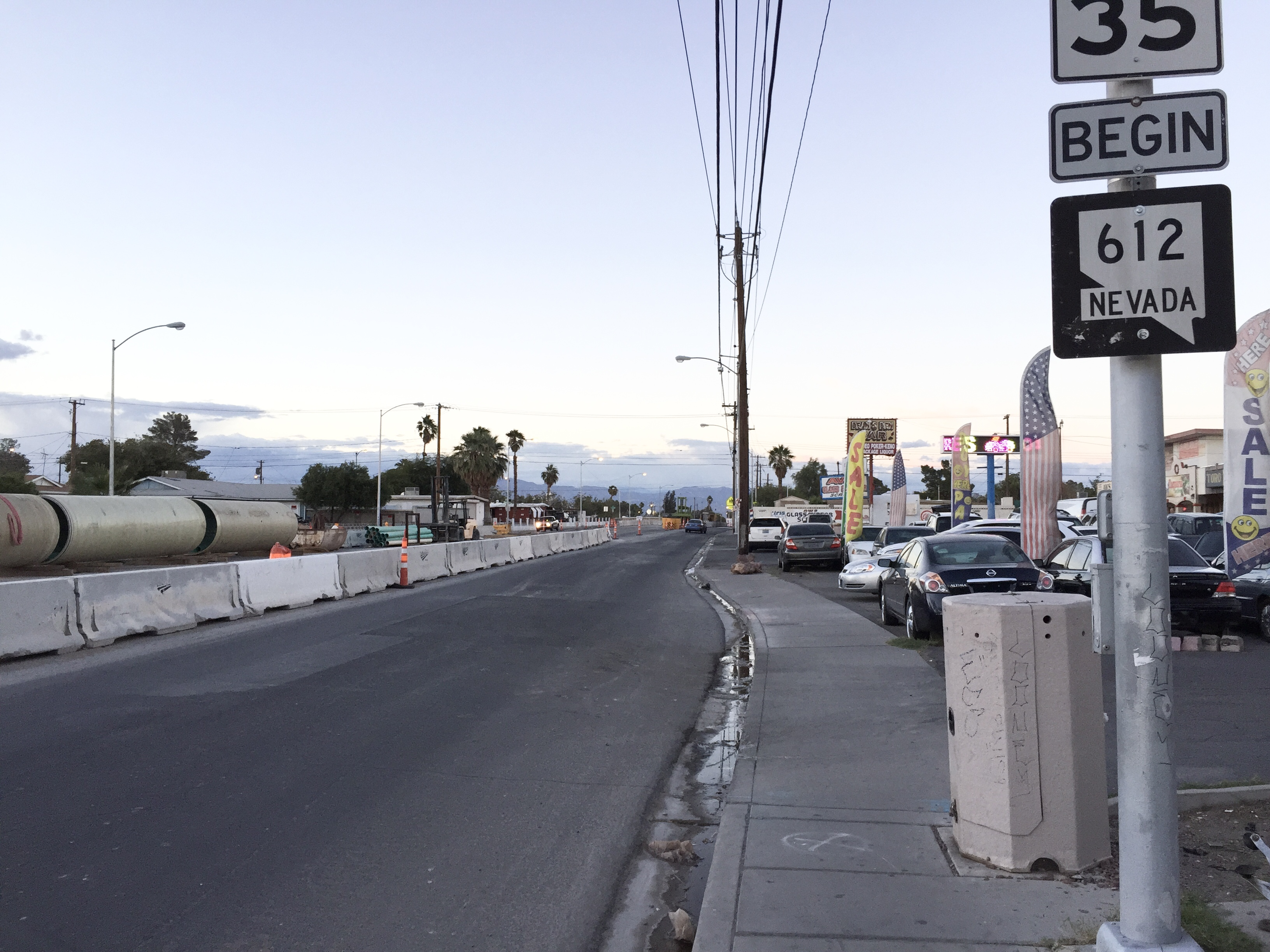
View at the south end of SR 612 looking northbound in 2015

State Route 612 begins at the intersection of Nellis Boulevard and Tropicana Avenue (SR 593) on the border of unincorporated communities of Paradise and Whitney. From there, the route heads north along Nellis Boulevard north as it travels through the Las Vegas area, entering the unincorporated town of Sunrise Manor and briefly forming the easternmost border of the city of Las Vegas. The state highway comes to an end at the intersection of Nellis Boulevard and Las Vegas Boulevard (SR 604) near Nellis Air Force Base.

SR 612, as Nellis Boulevard, passes by many retail businesses as well as residential neighborhoods. It is one of the major north–south roadways in Sunrise Manor.

== History ==
SR 612 was established in the 1976 renumbering of Nevada's state highways. The route was designated on July 1, 1976.

== Major intersections ==
The entire route is in Clark County.

Location	mi	km	Destinations	Notes
Paradise–Whitney line	−0.9	−1.4	Russell Road	Southern terminus of Nellis Boulevard
Paradise–Whitney line	0.000	0.000	Nellis Boulevard south	Continuation beyond southern terminus
Paradise–Whitney line	0.000	0.000	Tropicana Avenue (SR 593)	Southern terminus
Paradise–Sunrise Manor line	0.9	1.4	SR 582 (Boulder Highway)	
Paradise–Sunrise Manor line	1.0	1.6	Flamingo Road	
Sunrise Manor	3.1	5.0	Sahara Avenue	Former SR 589
Las Vegas–Sunrise Manor line	4.1	6.6	SR 159 west (Charleston Boulevard)	Nellis Boulevard changes signage from "South Nellis Boulevard" to "North Nellis Boulevard"
Sunrise Manor	6.7	10.8	SR 147 (Lake Mead Boulevard)	
Sunrise Manor	8.2	13.2	SR 574 west (Cheyenne Avenue)	
Sunrise Manor	9.400	15.128	SR 604 (Las Vegas Boulevard)	Northern terminus; former US 91/US 93
Sunrise Manor	9.400	15.128	Nellis Boulevard north	Continuation beyond northern terminus
Sunrise Manor	9.7	15.6	SR 573 (Craig Road)	Northern terminus of Nellis Boulevard
1.000 mi = 1.609 km; 1.000 km = 0.621 mi: Route transition

== Public transport ==
RTC Transit Route 115 functions on this road.
