= Nevada State Route 604 =

Highway in Nevada

State Route 604
- Las Vegas Boulevard
- SR 604 highlighted in red

Route information
- Maintained by NDOT
- Length: 12.007 mi (19.323 km)
- Existed: July 1, 1976–present

Major junctions
- South end: Carey Avenue in North Las Vegas
- SR 574 in Sunrise Manor; SR 610 north in Sunrise Manor; SR 612 south in Sunrise Manor; SR 573 west in Sunrise Manor
- North end: I-15 / US 93 in North Las Vegas

Location
- Country: United States
- State: Nevada
- County: Clark

Highway system
- Nevada State Highway System; Interstate; US; State; Pre‑1976; Scenic
← SR 599	→ SR 610

State Route 604 (SR 604) is the route number designation for parts of Las Vegas Boulevard, a major north–south road in the Las Vegas metropolitan area of Nevada in the United States best known for the Las Vegas Strip and its casinos. Formerly carrying U.S. Route 91, which had been the main highway between Los Angeles and Salt Lake City, it has been bypassed by Interstate 15 and serves mainly local traffic.

== Route description ==
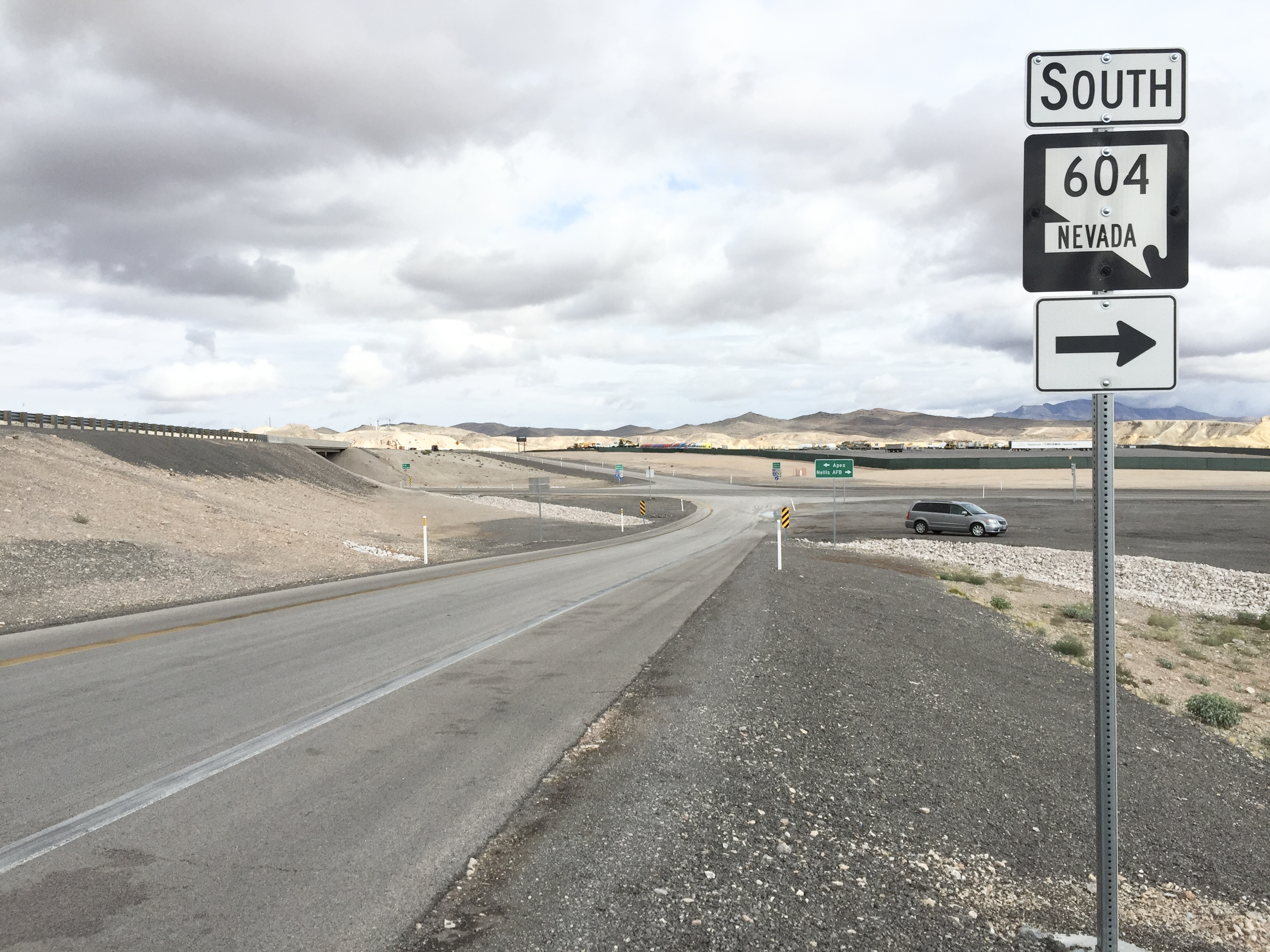
Ramp from northbound I-15/US 93 to the north end of SR 604 as seen in 2015

State Route 604 currently is a 12.017-mile (19.339 km) section of Las Vegas Boulevard going northeast from Carey Avenue in North Las Vegas. SR 604 enters the unincorporated town of Sunrise Manor, where it has intersections at Cheyenne Avenue (SR 574), Lamb Boulevard (SR 610) and Nellis Boulevard (SR 612). After that, SR 604 then passes Nellis Air Force Base where it intersects Craig Road (SR 573) and the main entrance of Nellis AFB. The highway then continues northeast as SR 604 passes the Las Vegas Motor Speedway and later re-enters an undeveloped area of the city of North Las Vegas. The highway leaves the city of North Las Vegas shortly after just before SR 604 ends at Interstate 15 at exit 58 near Apex. The I-15 frontage road stretching northeast 11.823 miles (19.027 km) from Apex to a point between Garnet and Crystal is also state maintained as FRCL07, and was mileposted as SR 604.

== History ==
State Route 604 was created on July 1, 1976 from what had been State Route 6 between Jean, where it intersected with State Route 161, and a point north of Las Vegas. However, it has been truncated over time, as segments were given to the city of Las Vegas and Clark County to maintain. The portion between Jean, Nevada and Carey Avenue has been given to local control. The portion of Las Vegas Boulevard between Tonopah Avenue and Carey Street was turned over to local control by 2017. From the mid-1980s to 2005, this highway was used as the course for the start and a significant portion of the Las Vegas Marathon.

== Major intersections ==
The entire route is in Clark County.

Location	mi	km	Destinations	Notes
North Las Vegas	0.000	0.000	Carey Avenue	Southern terminus
Sunrise Manor			SR 574 (Cheyenne Avenue)	
Sunrise Manor			SR 610 north / Lamb Boulevard	
Sunrise Manor			SR 612 (Nellis Boulevard)	
Sunrise Manor			SR 573 west (Craig Road) / Fitzgerald Boulevard	Serves Nellis Air Force Base main entrance
North Las Vegas	12.007	19.323	I-15 / US 93 – Las Vegas, Ely, Salt Lake City	Interchange; northern terminus; I-15 exit 58
1.000 mi = 1.609 km; 1.000 km = 0.621 mi
