= Garnet, Nevada =

Ghost town in Clark County, Nevada, United States

- Ghost town
- Location within the state of Nevada Location within the United States
- Coordinates: 36°23′19″N 114°52′16″W
- Country: United States
- State: Nevada
- County: Clark
- Elevation: 2,467 ft (752 m)
- Time zone: UTC-8 (Pacific (PST))
  - Summer (DST): UTC-7 (PDT)
- GNIS feature ID: 845843

Garnet is an extinct town in Clark County, Nevada, United States.

== Description ==
While not much remains of the former community, Garnet is most notable for being the site of the Apex Landfill, a large landfill that (while located in Garnet) is named after Apex, another nearby extinct town in Clark County. The landfill is among the biggest in the world and is the largest in the United States, as measured by tons of waste accepted per day.

Garnet is served by Interstate 15 (I‑15) and U.S. Route 93 (US 93). The Garnet Interchange (I-15 exit 64) is where US 93 splits from I‑15 to head north toward Ely.

== See also ==
- List of ghost towns in Nevada
