= Project Neon =

Project Neon may refer to:

- Microsoft Fluent Design System, previously referred to as Project Neon
- Project Neon, a design–build public works project in the Las Vegas, Nevada area
