= Mike O'Callaghan Military Medical Center =

- Nellis Air Force Base; Defense Health Agency

Geography
- Location: 4700 North Las Vegas Boulevard; Nellis Air Force Base, Clark County, Nevada, U.S.
- Coordinates: 36°14′45″N 115°02′57″W

Organisation
- Care system: Governmental
- Type: District
- Affiliated university: None
- Network: Nellis Air Force Base; United States Department of Veterans Affairs

Services
- Standards: Joint Commission
- Emergency department: Level III Trauma Center
- Beds: 80

Helipads
- Helipad: Yes

History
- Founded: August 1994; 31 years ago

Links
- Website: https://nellis.tricare.mil/

Mike O'Callaghan Military Medical Center is an American military hospital owned and operated by the United States Air Force. It is located on Nellis Air Force Base in Clark County, Nevada and is run by the 99th Medical Group (MDG).

Members of the 99th Medical Group run the 80-bed medical treatment facility. The Air Force provides executive oversight of the facility, staffs all outpatient activities/clinics and inpatient beds for Department of Defense (DoD) beneficiaries. Veterans Administration (VA) patients also have privileges at the hospital if referred by the VA.

Fully integrated into the Clark County emergency medical services (EMS) system, Mike O’Callaghan Military Medical Center (MOMMC) is the only hospital and only trauma center in northeast Las Vegas. The level III trauma center is the first Air Force medical facility to treat civilian critical care and trauma patients arriving by ambulance.

== History ==
Mike O'Callaghan Federal Hospital opened in August 1994, named after Nevada's 23rd Governor Mike O'Callaghan.

It was renamed Mike O'Callaghan Federal Medical Center in January 2012.

It was renamed Mike O'Callaghan Military Medical Center in March 2017.

Medical Center Commander is Colonel Ryan Mihata, who assumed command from Colonel Brent Johnson on July 15, 2022.
