= Nevada State Route 574 =

Highway in Nevada

State Route 574
- Cheyenne Avenue
- SR 574 highlighted in blue, remainder of Cheyenne Avenue in red

Route information
- Maintained by NDOT
- Length: 10.668 mi (17.168 km)
- Existed: July 1, 1976–present

Major junctions
- West end: I-11 / US 95 in Las Vegas
- I-15 / US 93 in North Las Vegas
- East end: SR 612 in Sunrise Manor

Location
- Country: United States
- State: Nevada
- County: Clark

Highway system
- Nevada State Highway System; Interstate; US; State; Pre‑1976; Scenic
← SR 573	→ SR 579

State Route 574 (SR 574) is a major east–west section line arterial roadway in the Las Vegas Valley of Nevada. It comprises approximately 10.668 miles (17.168 km) of Cheyenne Avenue in northern Las Vegas and North Las Vegas.

== Route description ==
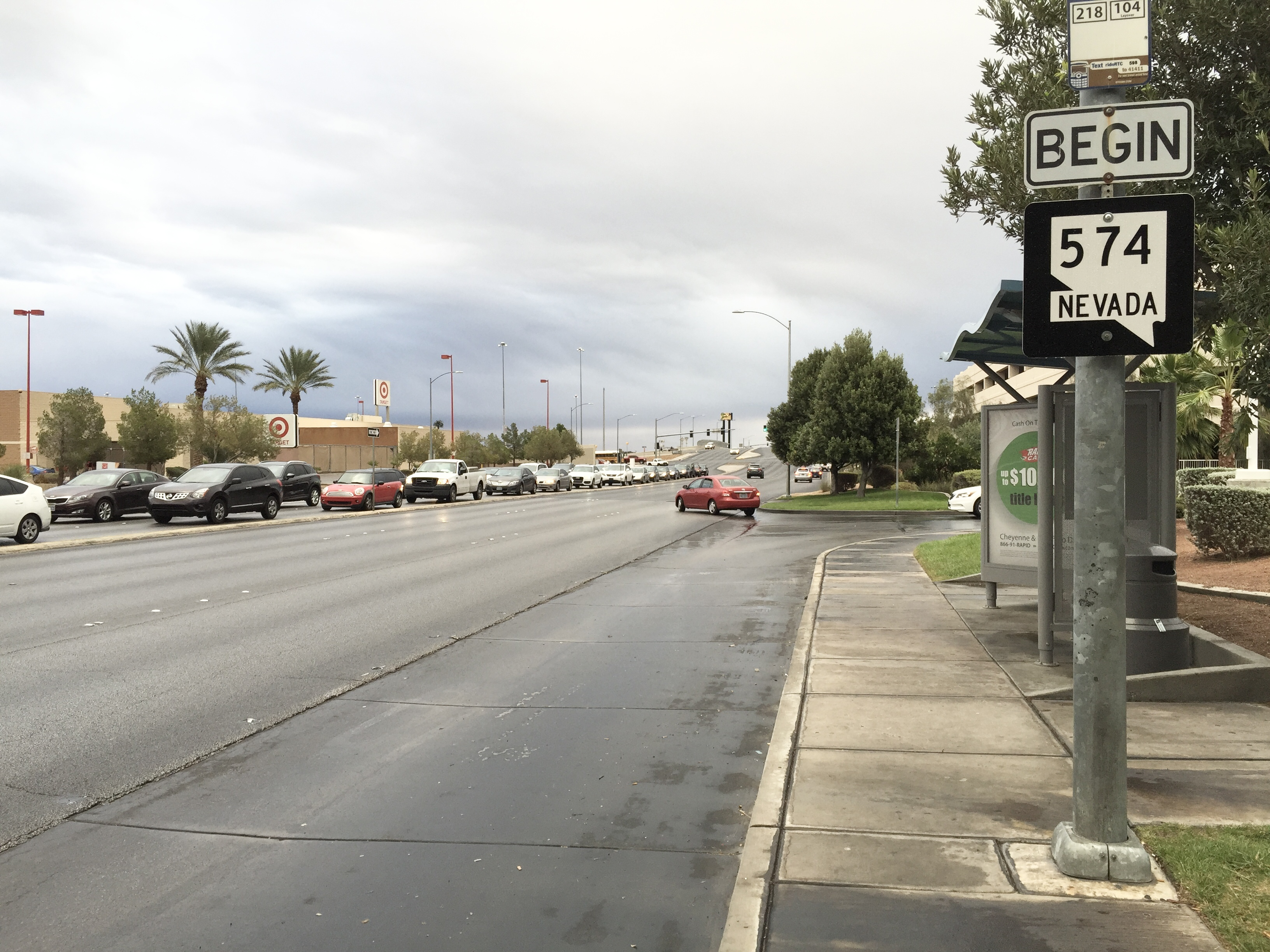
View at the west end of SR 574 looking eastbound as seen in 2015

State Route 574 begins at Interstate 11/U.S. Route 95 in northwest Las Vegas and heads east along Cheyenne Avenue. SR 574 then has an intersection at Rancho Drive (SR 599). At Decatur Boulevard, SR 574 enters North Las Vegas, skirting the northern edge of the North Las Vegas Airport. The highway continues east to intersect Interstate 15 and U.S. Route 93 and serves the main campus of the College of Southern Nevada. At Pecos Road, SR 574 enters the unincorporated town of Sunrise Manor where the highway has an intersection at Las Vegas Boulevard (SR 604) and continues eastward to its terminus at Nellis Boulevard (SR 612), near the southwest corner of Nellis Air Force Base.

== History ==
On January 29, 2022, nine people were killed and a tenth critically injured following a six-vehicle crash at the intersection of Cheyenne Avenue and Commerce Street in North Las Vegas. The crash occurred after a speeding Dodge Challenger ran a red light and struck the other five vehicles. The road accident—the deadliest in the area in recent history—was investigated by the National Transportation Safety Board.

== Major intersections ==
The entire route is in Clark County.

Location	mi	km	Destinations	Notes
Las Vegas	0.000	0.000	I-11 / US 95 (Purple Heart Highway) – Downtown Las Vegas, Tonopah, Reno	Interchange; western terminus; I-11/US 95 exit 83
Las Vegas			US 95 Bus. (Rancho Drive, SR 599)	Former US 95
Las Vegas–North Las Vegas line			Decatur Boulevard	
North Las Vegas			I-15 / US 93 (Las Vegas Freeway) – Los Angeles, Ely, Salt Lake City	Interchange; I-15 exit 46
North Las Vegas			Civic Center Drive	Former SR 607
Sunrise Manor			SR 604 (Las Vegas Boulevard)	Former US 91/US 93
Sunrise Manor	10.668	17.168	SR 612 (Nellis Boulevard)	Eastern terminus
1.000 mi = 1.609 km; 1.000 km = 0.621 mi

== Public transport ==
RTC Transit Route 218 functions on this road.
