= Interstate 15 in Nevada =

Highway in Nevada, United States

Interstate 15
- Las Vegas Freeway
- I-15 highlighted in red

Route information
- Maintained by NDOT
- Length: 123.762 mi (199.176 km)
- Existed: June 29, 1956–present
- NHS: Entire route

Major junctions
- South end: I-15 at the California state line in Primm
- I-215 / CC 215 in Enterprise; I-11 / US 93 / US 95 in Las Vegas; CC 215 in North Las Vegas; US 93 in North Las Vegas
- North end: I-15 at the Arizona state line in Mesquite

Location
- Country: United States
- State: Nevada
- County: Clark

Highway system
- Interstate Highway System; Main; Auxiliary; Suffixed; Business; Future; Nevada State Highway System; Interstate; US; State; Pre‑1976; Scenic
← I-11	→ SR 28

Interstate 15 (I-15), designated the Las Vegas Freeway, is an Interstate Highway in the US state of Nevada that begins in Primm, continues through Las Vegas, and crosses the border with Arizona in Mesquite. Within the state, the freeway runs entirely in Clark County. The highway was built along the corridor of the older U.S. Route 91 (US 91) and Arrowhead Trail, eventually replacing both of these roads.

== Route description ==
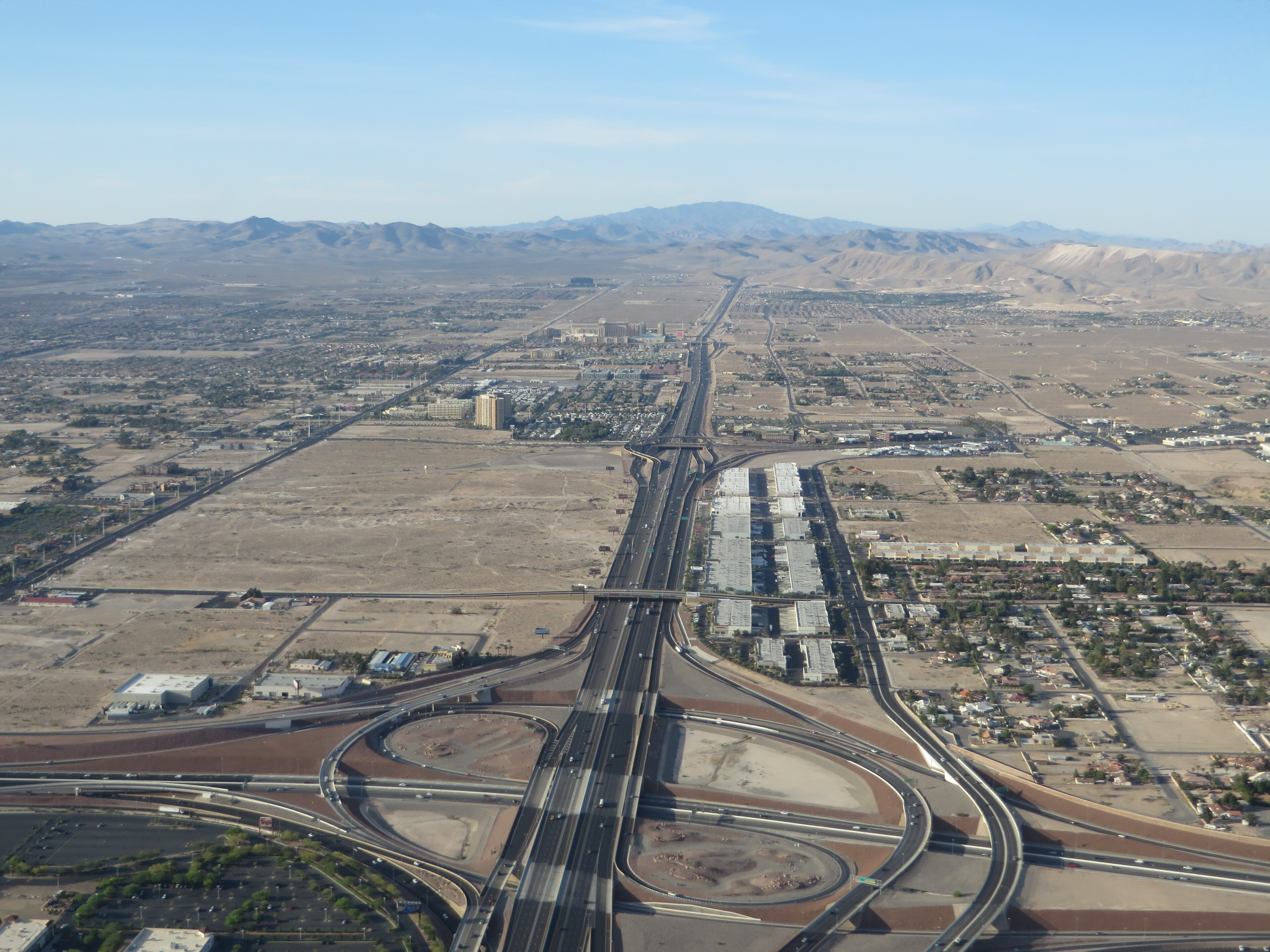
Aerial view of I-15 looking south from Sunset Road in the Las Vegas Valley as seen in 2014.

Motorists in California begin a long descent through Ivanpah Valley and Ivanpah Dry Lake. I-15 crosses the Nevada state line at the first exit, Primm. Once I-15 leaves Primm, the route travels north through the desert with few services. The highway then enters the Las Vegas urban area upon passing the State Route 146 (SR 146, Saint Rose Parkway) interchange.

From Saint Rose Parkway / Southern Highlands Parkway to I-11 and US 95, I-15 has HOV lanes that are currently enforced by both LVMPD (aka Metro) and NSP (formerly NHP).

The Interstate meets I-215 at the Southern Beltway Interchange, which provides access to Henderson and Harry Reid International Airport. Originally, this interchange was termed Son of Spaghetti Bowl by the Las Vegas Review-Journal when it was built.

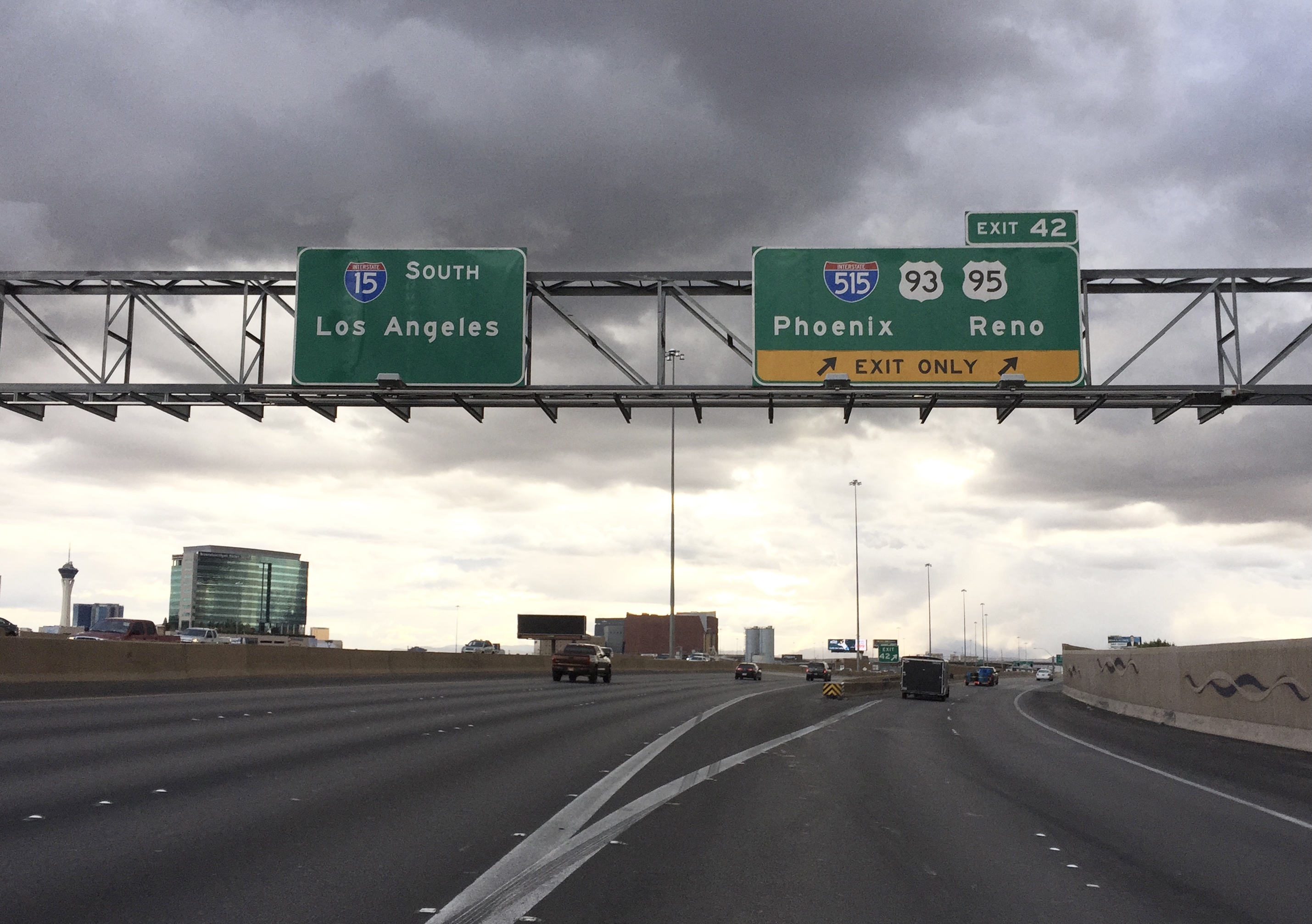
View south along I-15 at exit 42 (I-515/US 93/US 95) in Las Vegas as seen in 2015. I-515 was replaced by I-11 in 2024.

I-15 travels along the west side of the Las Vegas Strip corridor and just west of downtown Las Vegas just before its junction with I-11 and US 95 (the "Spaghetti Bowl" interchange). Then, the Interstate enters North Las Vegas and continues to run roughly parallel to Las Vegas Boulevard (old US 91) as it leaves the Las Vegas urban limits near the northern junction with the Clark County 215 beltway.

Once I-15 leaves North Las Vegas, the freeway travels northeast and crosses the Muddy River at Glendale and then climbs up onto the Mormon Mesa. At Mesquite, the freeway then crosses the Arizona state line and cuts through the extreme northwestern corner of Arizona through the Virgin River Gorge before entering Utah.

== History ==
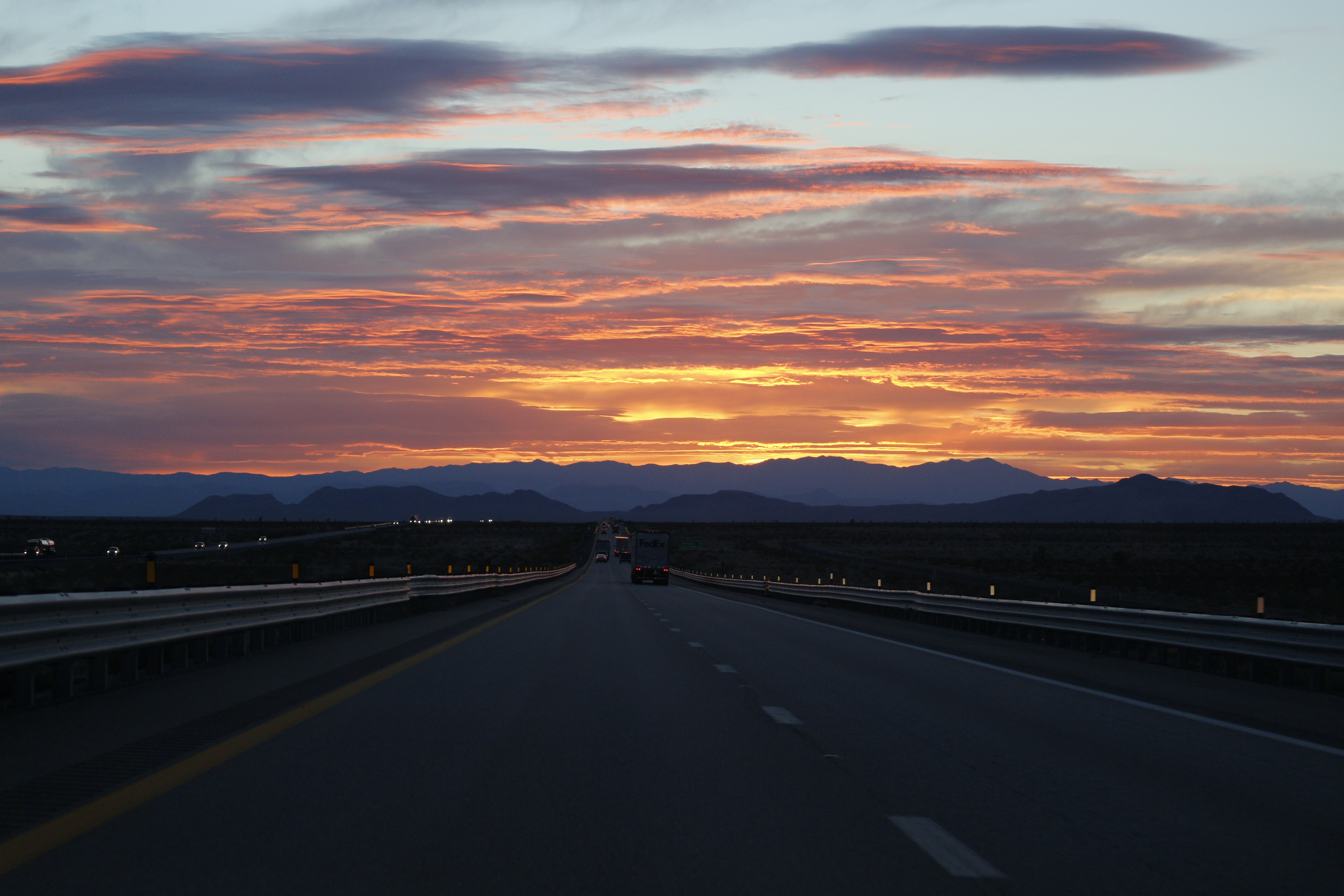
I-15 southbound near Glendale, Nevada as seen in 2018

State Route 6
- Location: California state line–Arizona state line
- Existed: c. 1919–November 11, 1926

U.S. Route 91
- Location: California state line–Arizona state line
- Existed: November 11, 1926–June 25, 1974

=== Early routes ===
The general location of the I-15 corridor through Nevada can be traced as far back as the early 1900s. Regular automobile travel through southern Nevada was established by 1914 along the Arrowhead Trail, a road connecting Los Angeles and Salt Lake City. In 1919, the Nevada Legislature amended its newly adopted highway law to add SR 6, which was described as "Commencing at the Arizona line near Mesquite and running southwesterly over what is now known as the Arrow Head trail [sic] through Las Vegas to Jean, Nevada." Two years later, the route was revised to pass through Las Vegas and head "via Jean or Goodsprings to a junction with the California state highway system."

US 91 was later proposed as part of the original 1925 U.S. Highway System plan. As originally proposed, US 91 would have followed SR 6 southwest from Mesquite to downtown Las Vegas, where it would then turn southeast along SR 5 to California via Searchlight. The revised 1926 plan had proposed US 91 follow SR 6 through Las Vegas and Jean to the California state line. Nevada's 1927 official highway map reflects the routing of the final 1926 plan; however, a few maps from the era indicate the original proposal.

US 91 / SR 6 began at Primm and followed the Los Angeles Highway toward Las Vegas. Within the city limits, it ran along Fifth Street (now Las Vegas Boulevard) through downtown and into North Las Vegas, where it departed from 5th at Main Street. Exiting the Las Vegas area to the northeast, US 91 became the Salt Lake Highway and then headed toward Apex and Glendale. The highway then curved east-northeast before following present-day SR 170 through Riverside and Bunkerville into Mesquite. US 91 was routed through that city on Mesquite Boulevard, Sandhill Boulevard and Fairview Avenue before crossing the Arizona state line. By 1929, the alignment of US 91 / SR 6 was graded throughout much of the state, a distance of 129.5 miles (208.4 km).

The route eventually gained two other highway overlaps. US 466 was christened in 1934, and was routed concurrently along US 91 from California to downtown Las Vegas before heading southeast to Hoover Dam (the route was deleted in 1971). Also, in 1936, US 93 was extended from its 1932 southern terminus at Glendale, over US 91 to downtown Las Vegas on its way to Hoover Dam.

=== Interstate development ===
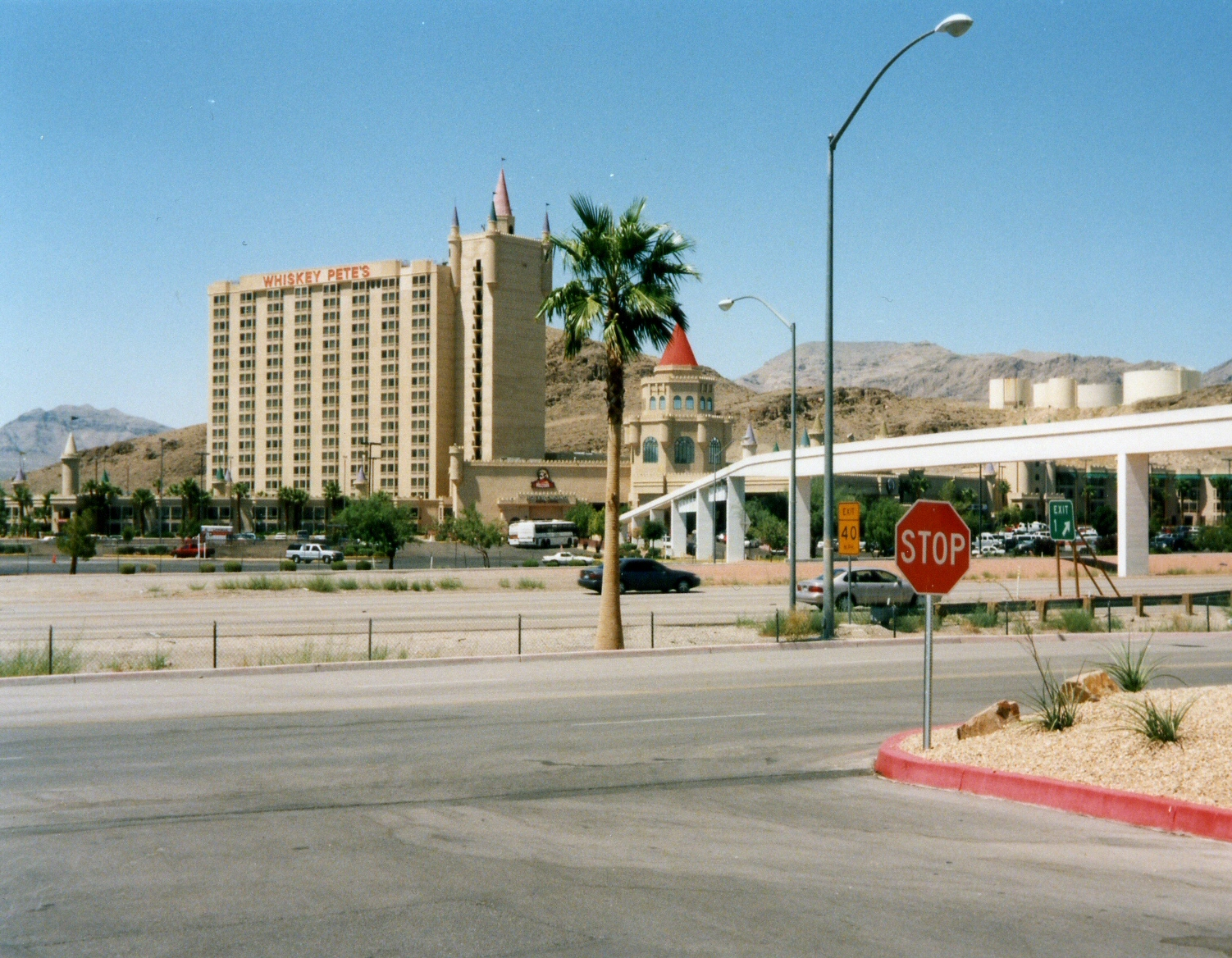
Las Vegas Boulevard (former US 91) parallels I-15 in Primm, just north of the California state line as seen in 2001

A new alignment of US 91 was completed in 1955. This bypassed both Bunkerville and Mesquite to the northwest, along what would become the future path of I-15. The original alignment through Bunkerville is now SR 170.

The passage of the Federal Aid Highway Act of 1956 quickly brought upgrades to the US 91 corridor. The first section of the newly designated I-15 opened by 1960. This stretch extended from the California state line to just north of Sloan. In 1963, the new freeway reached the south end of the Las Vegas Valley at Blue Diamond Road, and more than 20 miles (32 km) south of Glendale was also finished. By 1967, I-15 had been constructed along the entire length of US 91 except through parts of Las Vegas and near Mesquite.

The final sections of I-15 to be completed were in North Las Vegas and near the Arizona state line. Both of these sections were completed in 1974. The US 91 designation, which had remained on its original alignment during the construction of the Interstate, was made redundant by the new freeway and was removed on June 25, 1974.

Between Las Vegas and the California state line, the Nevada Department of Transportation (NDOT) added call boxes at one-mile (1.6 km) intervals in the mid-2000s, for motorists with vehicle problems and without cell phone service. This was done as part of a larger project that expanded this portion of the freeway to three travel lanes in each direction to coordinate with a similar effort in California.

In August 2011, I-15 in southern Las Vegas was substantially expanded. This involved adding between 30 and 85% more capacity and involved the use of the Big Stan drill rig.

== Future ==
Due to heaviest traffic, there are plans by the California Department of Transportation (Caltrans) and NDOT to widen I-15 in both directions from both Bear Valley Road at Hesperia–Victorville city line and I-40 in Barstow to Sloan Road in Enterprise.

In 2020, Brightline signed a 50-year lease for use of the I-15 right-of-way between Victor Valley and the Nevada state line for use in their Brightline West high-speed rail service.

== Exit list ==
The entire route is in Clark County.

Location	mi	km	Exit	Destinations	Notes
Primm	0.000	0.000		I-15 south – San Bernardino, Los Angeles	Continuation into California; former US 91 south/US 466 west
Primm	0.39	0.63	1	Primm Boulevard – Primm	
Jean	12.63	20.33	12	SR 161 west (Goodsprings Road) – Jean, Goodsprings	
Enterprise	25.52	41.07	25	Sloan Road – Sloan	Proposed interchange upgrade for Via Inspirada access; former SR 739 east
Enterprise	27.84	44.80	27	SR 146 east (Saint Rose Parkway) / Southern Highlands Parkway – Henderson, Lake Mead	Future southern end of HOV lane; serves Henderson Executive Airport
Enterprise	29.37	47.27	29	Starr Avenue	Serves Henderson Executive Airport
Enterprise	30.39	48.91	30	Cactus Avenue	
Enterprise	31.36	50.47	31	Silverado Ranch Boulevard	Current southern end of HOV lane
Enterprise	33.55	53.99	33	SR 160 (Blue Diamond Road) – Pahrump	
Enterprise	34.85	56.09	34	I-215 east / CC 215 west / Las Vegas Boulevard – Harry Reid International Airport, Henderson	Northbound exit is part of exit 33; southbound exit to CC 215 west is part of exit 36; future I-215 west; I-215 exit 12
Paradise	36.39	58.56	36	Russell Road	Signed as exit 35 northbound; northbound also includes exit to Frank Sinatra Drive; former SR 594; serves Allegiant Stadium
Paradise	37.40	60.19	37	Tropicana Avenue (SR 593)	Signed as exit 36 northbound; northbound also includes exit to Frank Sinatra Drive; serves T-Mobile Arena
Paradise	37.90	60.99	♦	Harmon Avenue	HOV access only; northbound exit and southbound entrance
Paradise	38.35	61.72	38	Flamingo Road (SR 592 west)	Signed as exits 38A (west) and 38B (east) southbound
Paradise	39.16	63.02	39	Spring Mountain Road	Northbound ramp also includes exit to Desert Inn Road, Highland Drive, and Western Avenue; former SR 591; serves Sunrise Hospital & Medical Center
Las Vegas	40.55	65.26	40	Sahara Avenue	Former SR 589; serves Sunrise Hospital & Medical Center
Las Vegas	41.47	66.74	♦	Neon Gateway (Western Avenue)	HOV access only
Las Vegas	41.75	67.19	41	SR 159 (Charleston Boulevard)	Northbound ramps also include access to Alta Drive, Bonneville Avenue, and Grand Central Parkway; serves University Medical Center of Southern Nevada and Valley Hospital Medical Center
Las Vegas	42.89	69.02	♦	I-11 north / US 95 north	Spaghetti Bowl; HOV access only; northbound exit and southbound entrance; northern end of HOV lane
Las Vegas	42.89	69.02	42	I-11 / US 93 south / US 95 / Martin L. King Boulevard – Downtown Las Vegas, Phoenix, Reno	Spaghetti Bowl; southern end of US 93 concurrency; signed as exits 42A (north) and 42B (south) northbound; I-11/US 95 exit 76; former I-515 south
Las Vegas	43.47– 43.60	69.96– 70.17	43	Washington Avenue (SR 578 east) / D Street / City Parkway	Signed as exit 44 southbound
North Las Vegas	44.72	71.97	45	Lake Mead Boulevard (SR 147 east)	Serves North Vista Hospital
North Las Vegas	46.43	74.72	46	Cheyenne Avenue (SR 574)	
North Las Vegas	48.41	77.91	48	Craig Road (SR 573)	Serves Mike O'Callaghan Military Medical Center
North Las Vegas	50.13	80.68	50	Lamb Boulevard (SR 610 south)	
North Las Vegas	52.00	83.69	52	CC 215 west / Tropical Parkway	Signed as exits 52A (CC 215 west) and 52B (Tropical Parkway) northbound; future I-215 west
North Las Vegas	53.62	86.29	54	Speedway Boulevard / Hollywood Boulevard	Serves Mike O'Callaghan Military Medical Center and Las Vegas Motor Speedway
North Las Vegas	58.14	93.57	58	SR 604 south (Las Vegas Boulevard) – Apex, Nellis AFB	Former US 91/US 93
North Las Vegas	64.29	103.46	64	US 93 north – Ely	Northern end of US 93 concurrency; Diverging diamond interchange
Crystal–Moapa River Indian Reservation line	75.67	121.78	75	Valley of Fire Highway – Valley of Fire, Lake Mead	
Moapa River Indian Reservation	80.76	129.97	80	Ute	
	84.54	136.05	84	Byron	
	88.68	142.72	88	Hidden Valley Road – Hidden Valley	
Glendale–Moapa line	90.84	146.19	90	SR 168 west (Glendale–Moapa Road) – Glendale, Moapa	Northbound exit and southbound entrance; SR 168 west was formerly part of US 93 north
Glendale–Moapa line	91.61	147.43	91	Glendale, Moapa (Glendale Boulevard, Lewis Ranch Road)	No southbound entrance
Moapa Valley	93.89	151.10	93	SR 169 south (Moapa Valley Boulevard) – Logandale, Overton	
	100.43	161.63	100	Carp, Elgin (Carp–Elgin Road)	
Mesquite	112.01	180.26	112	SR 170 east (Riverside Road) – Riverside, Bunkerville	SR 170 east was formerly part of US 91 north
Mesquite	118.14	190.13	118	Lower Flat Top Drive	
Mesquite	120.34	193.67	120	Falcon Ridge Parkway, Mesquite Boulevard	Dumbbell interchange; Mesquite Boulevard was former I-15 Bus. north/SR 144 north; serves Mesa View Regional Hospital
Mesquite	122.90	197.79	122	Pioneer Boulevard, Sandhill Boulevard	Sandhill Boulevard was former I-15 Bus. south/SR 144 south
Mesquite	123.762	199.176		I-15 north – Salt Lake City	Continuation into Arizona
1.000 mi = 1.609 km; 1.000 km = 0.621 mi: Concurrency terminus; HOV only; Incomplete access

== See also ==
- Los Angeles and Salt Lake Railroad

Interstate 15
Previous state: California	Nevada	Next state: Arizona
