= Nevada State Route 655 =

Highway in Nevada

State Route 655
- Waltham Way
- SR 655 highlighted in red

Route information
- Maintained by NDOT
- Length: 1.138 mi (1.831 km)

Location
- Country: United States
- State: Nevada
- Counties: Storey, Washoe

Highway system
- Nevada State Highway System; Interstate; US; State; Pre‑1976; Scenic
← SR 648	→ SR 659

State Route 655 (SR 655) is a state highway in Nevada. It begins at ramps 3 and 4 of the Patrick Interchange (exit 28) on Interstate 80 in Washoe County, running along old frontage roads 13 and 14 east and south to a bridge over the Truckee River into Storey County. SR 655 ends 0.054 miles into Storey County.

Route 655 is also known as Waltham Way.

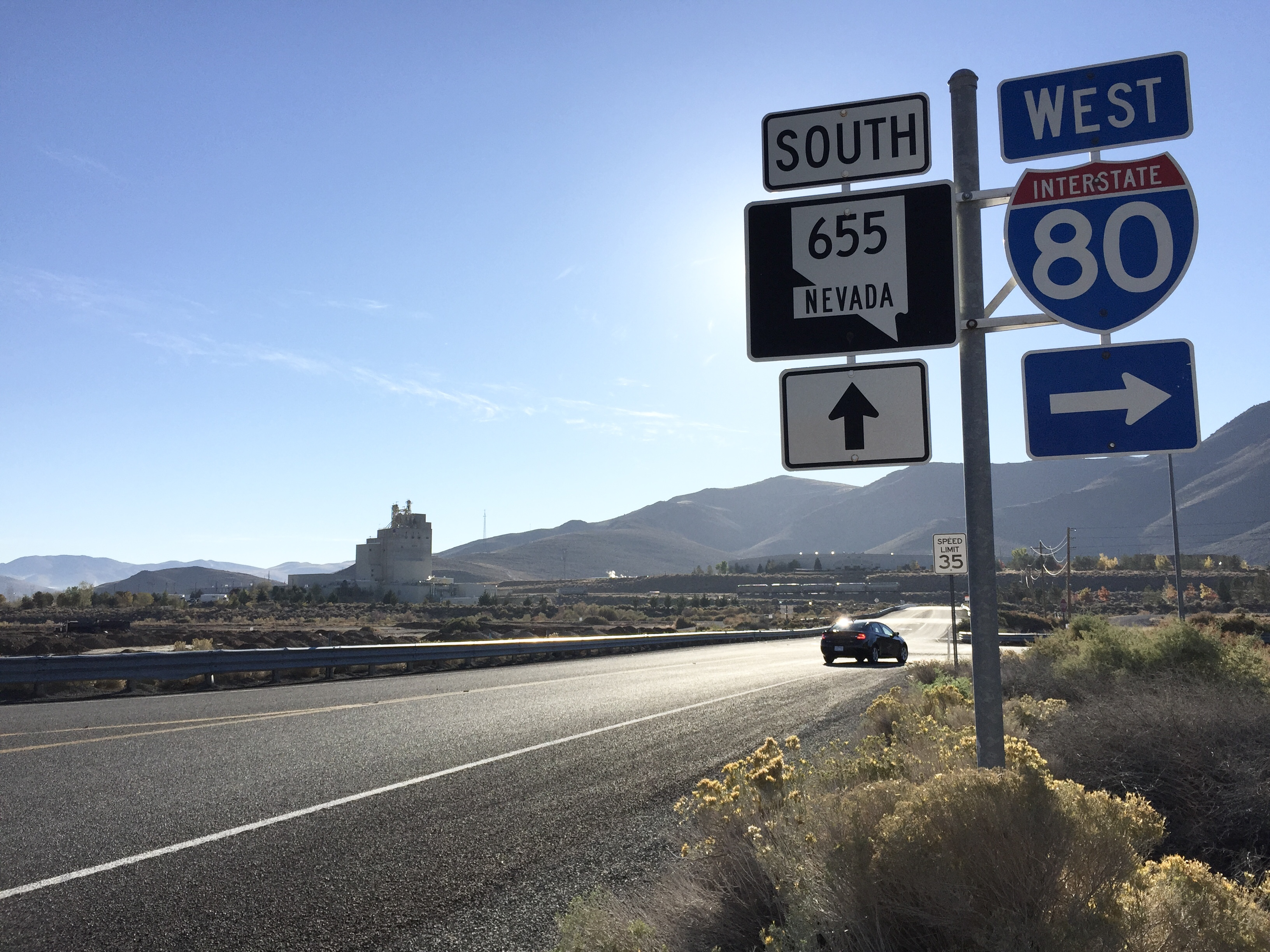
View south along SR 655

== Major intersections ==
County	Location	mi	km	Destinations	Notes
Washoe		0.000	0.000	I-80	
Storey		1.138	1.831	Waltham Way	Continuation past eastern end
1.000 mi = 1.609 km; 1.000 km = 0.621 mi
