= Nevada State Route 170 =

Highway in Nevada

State Route 170
- Riverside Road
- State Route 170, highlighted in red

Route information
- Maintained by NDOT
- Length: 12.268 mi (19.743 km)
- Existed: July 1, 1976–present

Major junctions
- West end: I-15 west of Mesquite
- East end: Mesquite Boulevard in Mesquite

Location
- Country: United States
- State: Nevada
- County: Clark

Highway system
- Nevada State Highway System; Interstate; US; State; Pre‑1976; Scenic
← SR 169	→ SR 171

State Route 170 (SR 170) is a state highway in northeastern Clark County, Nevada. Also known as Riverside Road, the route serves the Riverside townsite, the town of Bunkerville and the city of Mesquite. The highway was previously a part of former U.S. Route 91 (US 91).

== Route description ==
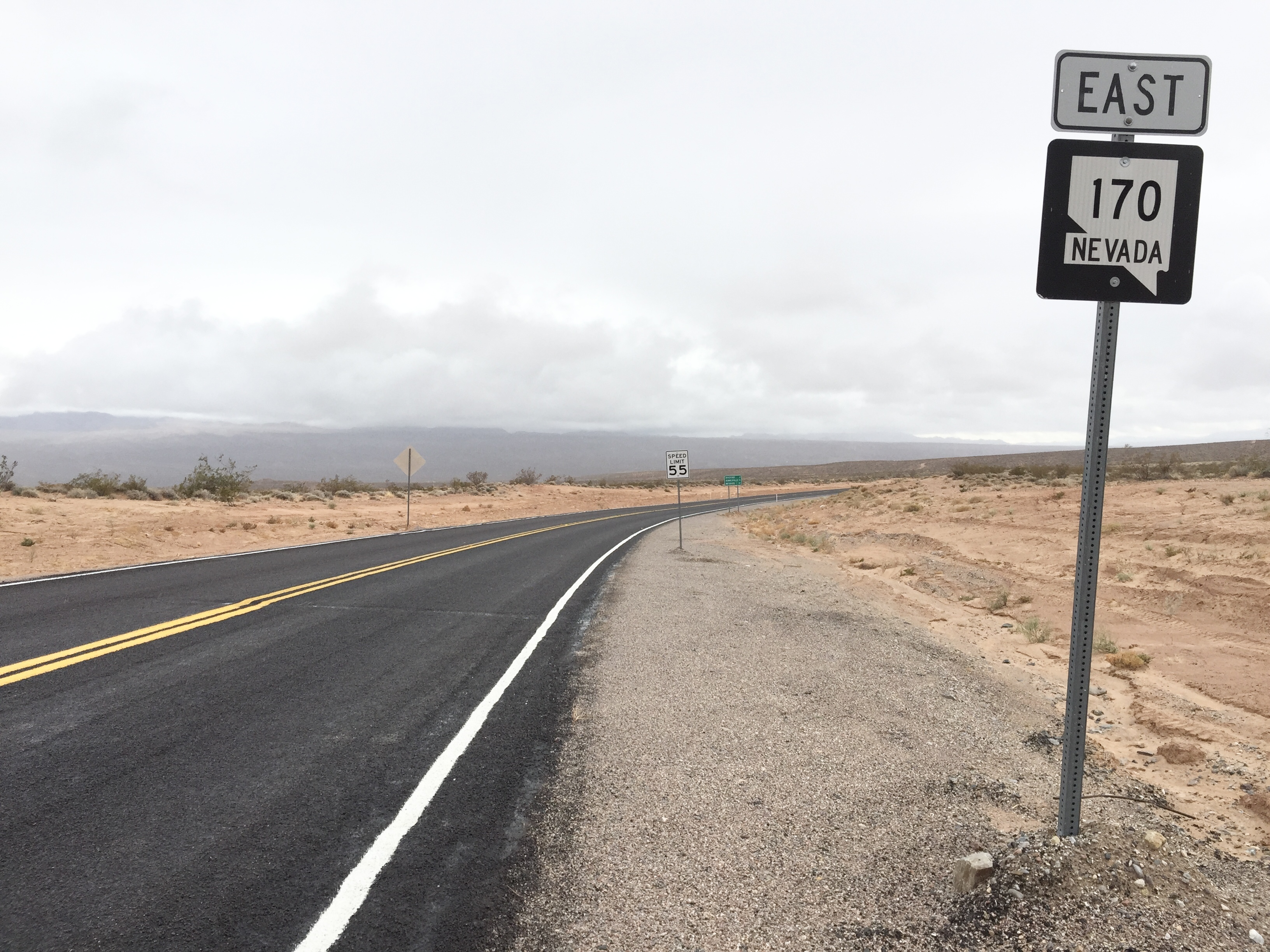
View from the west end of SR 170 looking eastbound as seen in 2015

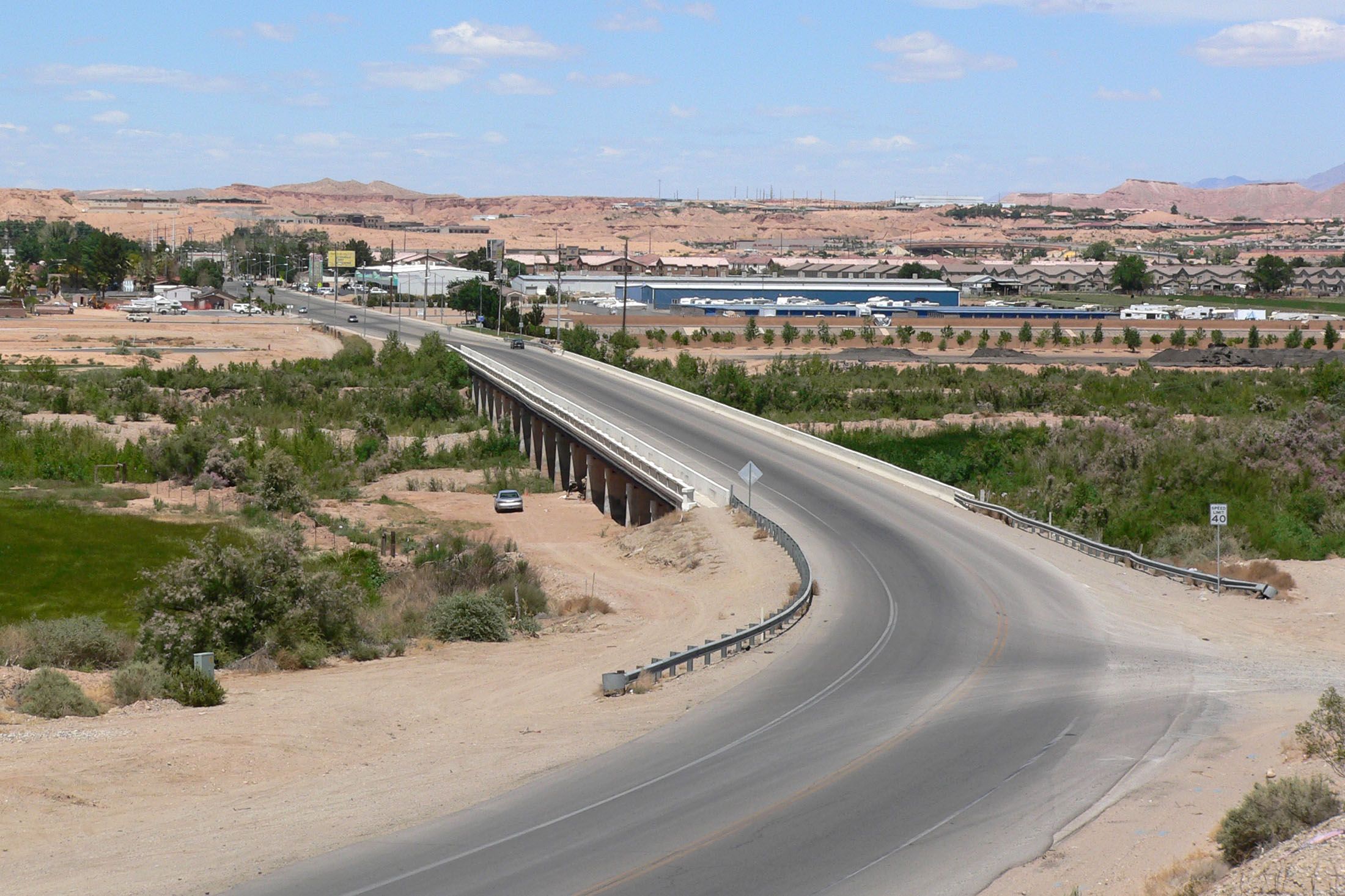
SR 170 crossing the Virgin River looking north toward Mesquite as seen in 2007

SR 170 begins at the Interstate 15 (I-15) Riverside interchange (exit 112), approximately 60 miles (97 km) northwest of Las Vegas in Virgin Valley. From there, the two-lane highway meanders southeasterly approximately 3 miles (4.8 km) before reaching the Riverside townsite and the Virgin River. The route crosses the river, then turns northeasterly to somewhat parallel the south side of the river. The highway travels about 6 miles (9.7 km) before reaching the town of Bunkerville. After another 2 miles (3.2 km), the highway turns due north, crosses the Virgin River again, and enters the city of Mesquite. The highway travels about one more mile (1.6 km) northward through the southern portion of the city before ending at an intersection with Mesquite Boulevard (former SR 144).

== History ==
A gravel road approximating the alignment of present-day SR 170 appeared on official state maps by 1933. This road was marked as part of State Route 6 and U.S. Route 91—these designations traversed the southern portion of the state from the California state line to the Arizona state line at Mesquite via Las Vegas. The road in this area was fully paved by 1934. By 1955, a shorter, multi-lane highway had been constructed to bypass Bunkerville to the northwest. US 91 (and SR 6) were relocated from Riverside Road to the new alignment, which would later become I-15.

In 1976, the Nevada Department of Transportation began an effort to renumber its state highways. In this process, Riverside Road would again be designated a state highway, State Route 170. This designation was applied on July 1, 1976, and was first seen on state highway maps in 1978. The route has remained relatively unchanged since.

== Major intersections ==
The entire route is in Clark County.

Location	mi	km	Destinations	Notes
	0.000	0.000	I-15 – Las Vegas, Salt Lake City	Interchange; western terminus; I-15 exit 112; former US 91 south
Mesquite	12.268	19.743	Mesquite Boulevard	Eastern terminus; former I-15 Bus./SR 144/US 91 north
1.000 mi = 1.609 km; 1.000 km = 0.621 mi
