= Nevada State Route 573 =

Highway in Nevada

State Route 573
- Craig Road
- SR 573 highlighted in red, remainder of Craig Road in blue

Route information
- Maintained by NDOT
- Length: 5.408 mi (8.703 km)
- Existed: July 1, 1976–present

Section 1
- Length: 2.317 mi (3.729 km)
- West end: I-11 / US 95 in Las Vegas
- East end: Decatur Boulevard at Las Vegas–North Las Vegas line

Section 2
- Length: 3.091 mi (4.974 km)
- West end: Berg Street in North Las Vegas
- Major intersections: I-15 / US 93 in North Las Vegas
- East end: SR 604 in Sunrise Manor

Location
- Country: United States
- State: Nevada
- County: Clark

Highway system
- Nevada State Highway System; Interstate; US; State; Pre‑1976; Scenic
← SR 564	→ SR 574

State Route 573 (SR 573) comprises two sections of Craig Road, a major east–west arterial roadway in the Las Vegas Valley.

== Route description ==
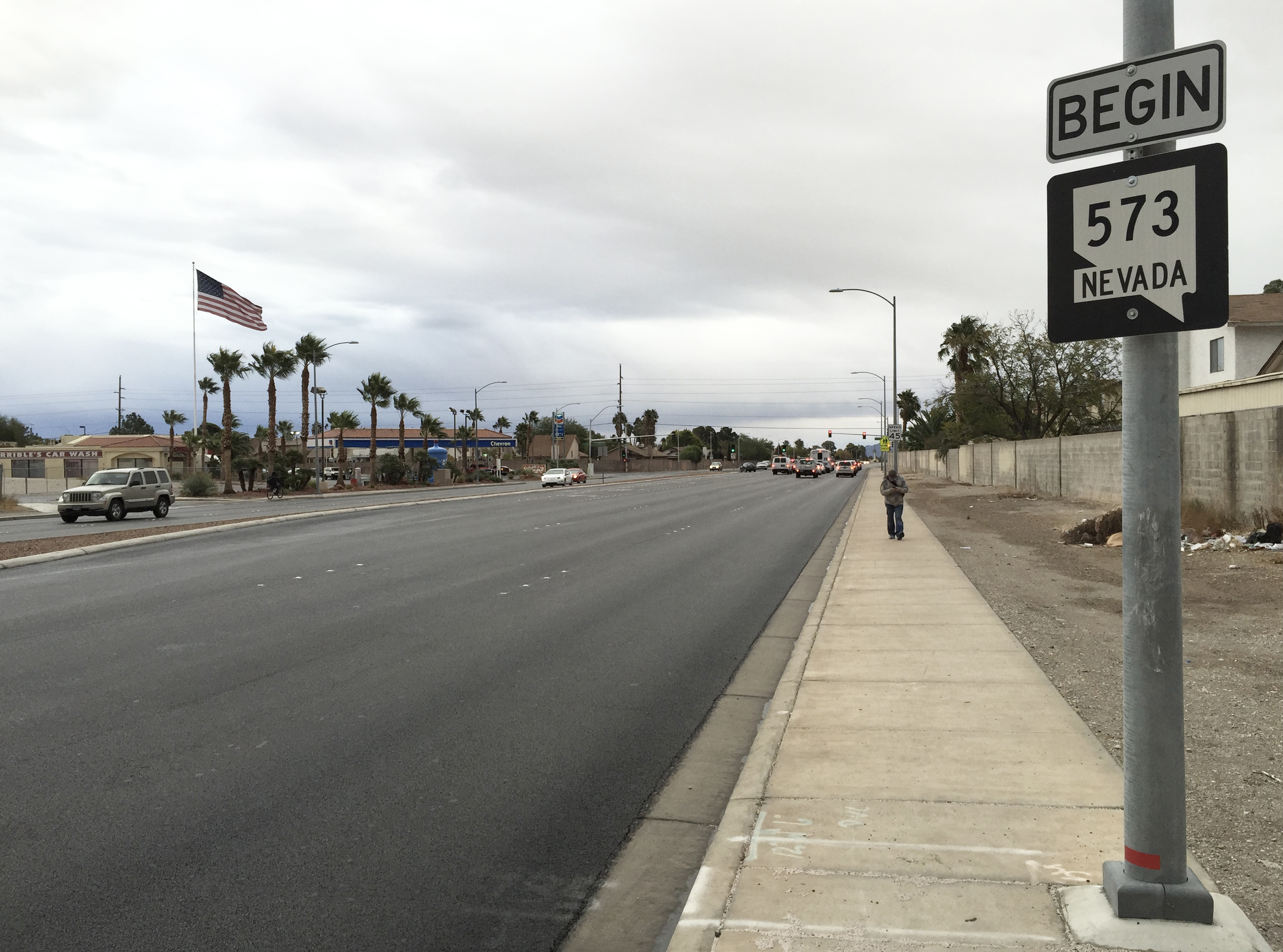
View at the west end of SR 573 looking eastbound as seen in 2015

The first section of SR 573 begins at the Craig Road interchange with Interstate 11/U.S. Route 95. From there, it proceeds eastward to the Las Vegas–North Las Vegas city limits at Decatur Boulevard.

The second section of SR 573 resumes at the intersection of Craig Road and Berg Street in the city of North Las Vegas. From this point, the highway continues east on Craig Road where it has a junction at Interstate 15 and U.S. Route 93. SR 573 has an intersection with Lamb Boulevard (SR 610) where the highway enters the unincorporated town of Sunrise Manor. SR 573 eventually reaches its eastern terminus at Las Vegas Boulevard (SR 604) at the main entrance to Nellis Air Force Base.

== History ==
Previously, the portion of Craig Road within North Las Vegas (between Decatur Boulevard and Frehner Road) was a part of SR 573. This section was decommissioned in 2002 and turned over to the City of North Las Vegas, which promptly reconstructed the roadway.

== Major intersections ==
The entire route is in Clark County.

Location	mi	km	Destinations	Notes
Las Vegas	0.000	0.000	I-11 / US 95 (Purple Heart Highway) – Downtown Las Vegas, Tonopah, Reno	Interchange; western terminus; I-11/US 95 exit 85
Las Vegas			US 95 Bus. (Rancho Drive, SR 599)	Former US 95
Las Vegas–North Las Vegas line	2.317	3.729	Decatur Boulevard	Eastern terminus
Gap in route
North Las Vegas	0.000	0.000	Berg Street	Western terminus
North Las Vegas			I-15 / US 93 (Las Vegas Freeway) – Los Angeles, Ely, Salt Lake City	Interchange; I-15 exit 48
Sunrise Manor			SR 610 (Lamb Boulevard)	
Sunrise Manor	3.091	4.974	SR 604 (Las Vegas Boulevard)	Eastern terminus; main entrance to Nellis Air Force Base; former US 91/US 93
1.000 mi = 1.609 km; 1.000 km = 0.621 mi

== Public transport ==
RTC Transit Route 219 functions on this road.
