= Nevada State Route 610 =

Highway in Nevada

State Route 610
- Lamb Boulevard
- SR 610 highlighted in red

Route information
- Maintained by NDOT
- Length: 2.370 mi (3.814 km)
- Existed: July 1, 1976–present

Major junctions
- South end: SR 604 in Sunrise Manor
- SR 573 at North Las Vegas–Sunrise Manor line
- North end: I-15 / US 93 in North Las Vegas

Location
- Country: United States
- State: Nevada
- County: Clark

Highway system
- Nevada State Highway System; Interstate; US; State; Pre‑1976; Scenic
← SR 604	→ SR 612

State Route 610 (SR 610) is a state highway in Clark County, Nevada. It comprises a small portion of Lamb Boulevard in the northeastern Las Vegas Valley.

== Route description ==
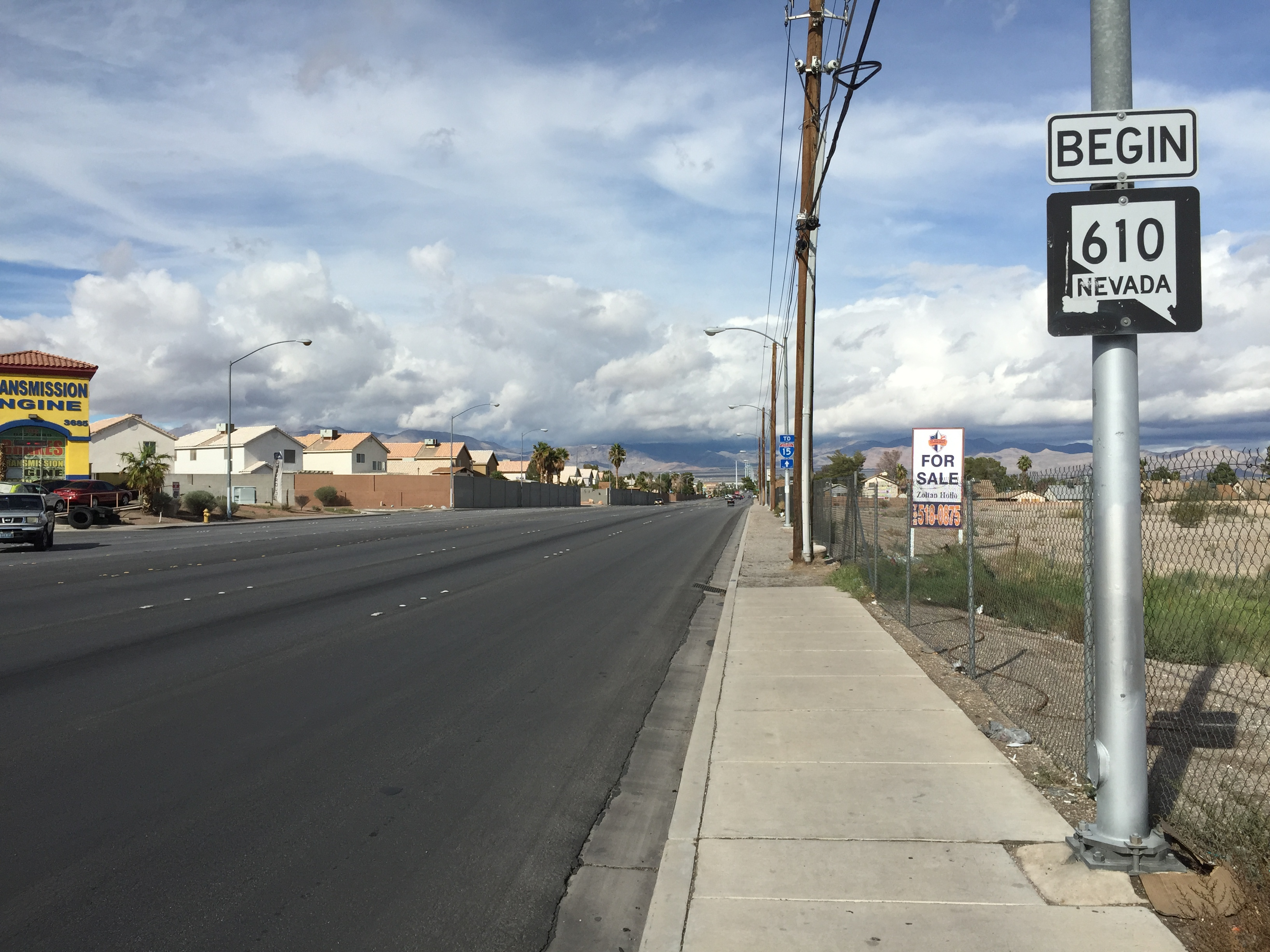
View at the south end of SR 610 looking northbound as seen in 2015

State Route 610 begins at the intersection of Las Vegas Boulevard North (SR 604) and Lamb Boulevard in the unincorporated township of Sunrise Manor. From there, it follows Lamb Boulevard northward, passing through mostly residential neighborhoods. The route eventually enters the city of North Las Vegas and passes by some industrial businesses. The SR 610 designation ends at the Lamb Boulevard interchange with Interstate 15 (I-15) and U.S. Route 93 (US 93).

== History ==
By 1968, the I-15 under construction in Nevada had a terminus at the Lamb Boulevard interchange. Freeway traffic to the north of Las Vegas transitioned from the Interstate to the old highways on Las Vegas Boulevard (U.S. Routes 91 and 93) by way of Lamb Boulevard. The Interstate access along Lamb Boulevard was no longer a major through movement by 1972, as I-15 was completed further south into the urban core of Las Vegas by that time.

SR 610 was established in the 1976 renumbering of Nevada's state highways. The route was designated on July 1, 1976.

== Major intersections ==
The entire route is in Clark County.

Location	mi	km	Destinations	Notes
Sunrise Manor	0.000	0.000	SR 604 (Las Vegas Boulevard)	Southern terminus; former US 91/US 93
North Las Vegas–Sunrise Manor line			SR 573 (Craig Road)	
North Las Vegas	2.370	3.814	I-15 / US 93 (Las Vegas Freeway) – Los Angeles, Ely, Salt Lake City	Interchange; northern terminus; I-15 exit 50
1.000 mi = 1.609 km; 1.000 km = 0.621 mi

== Public transport ==
RTC Transit Route 203 functions on this road.
