= Las Vegas Boulevard =

Road in Clark County, Nevada, United States

- Las Vegas Boulevard highlighted in red

Route information
- Maintained by Clark County, City of Las Vegas and NDOT (SR 604 portion)
- Length: 51.4 mi (82.7 km)
- Component highways: SR 604 in North Las Vegas
- Tourist routes: Las Vegas Strip
- NHS: From Stewart Avenue to I-11 / US 93 / US 95

Primm section
- South end: Lotto Store Road in Primm
- North end: 300 ft (91 m) north of McCullough Pass in Primm

Main section
- South end: 5.01 mi (8.06 km) south of Prison Road in Jean
- Major intersections: SR 161 west in Sloan; I-15 north in Sloan; SR 146 at the Enterprise–Henderson line; SR 160 west in Enterprise; CC 215 west / I-215 east / I-15 north in Enterprise; SR 562 east at the Enterprise–Paradise line; SR 593 west in Paradise; I-11 / US 93 / US 95 in Las Vegas; SR 579 west in Las Vegas; SR 578 west in Las Vegas; ( SR 604): I-15 / US 93 in Apex
- North end: Moapa Paulite Solar Road near the Moapa Band of Paiute Indians in Clark County

SR 604
- South end: Carey Avenue in North Las Vegas
- Major intersections: SR 574 in Sunrise Manor; SR 610 north in Sunrise Manor; SR 612 south in Sunrise Manor; SR 573 west in Sunrise Manor
- North end: I-15 / US 93 in North Las Vegas

Location
- Country: United States
- State: Nevada
- County: Clark

Highway system
- Nevada State Highway System; Interstate; US; State; Pre‑1976; Scenic

Las Vegas Boulevard is a major road in Clark County, Nevada, United States, best known for the Las Vegas Strip portion of the road and its casinos. Formerly carrying U.S. Route 91 (US 91), which had been the main highway between Los Angeles, California, and Salt Lake City, Utah, it has been bypassed by Interstate 15 and serves mainly local traffic with some sections designated State Route 604.

== Route description ==
Las Vegas Boulevard runs the length of the Las Vegas metropolitan area in Clark County. "The Boulevard", as it is sometimes called by longtime Las Vegas residents, starts at about 3.75-mile (6.04 km) southwest of the ghost town of Crystal, and continues south to about 2 mi (3.2 km) south of Jean, in the Mojave Desert. The Boulevard shows up again in Primm, but is currently not connected to the northern sections. There are plans to connect the existing section at Primm to the northern section at Jean via Southern Nevada Supplemental Airport.

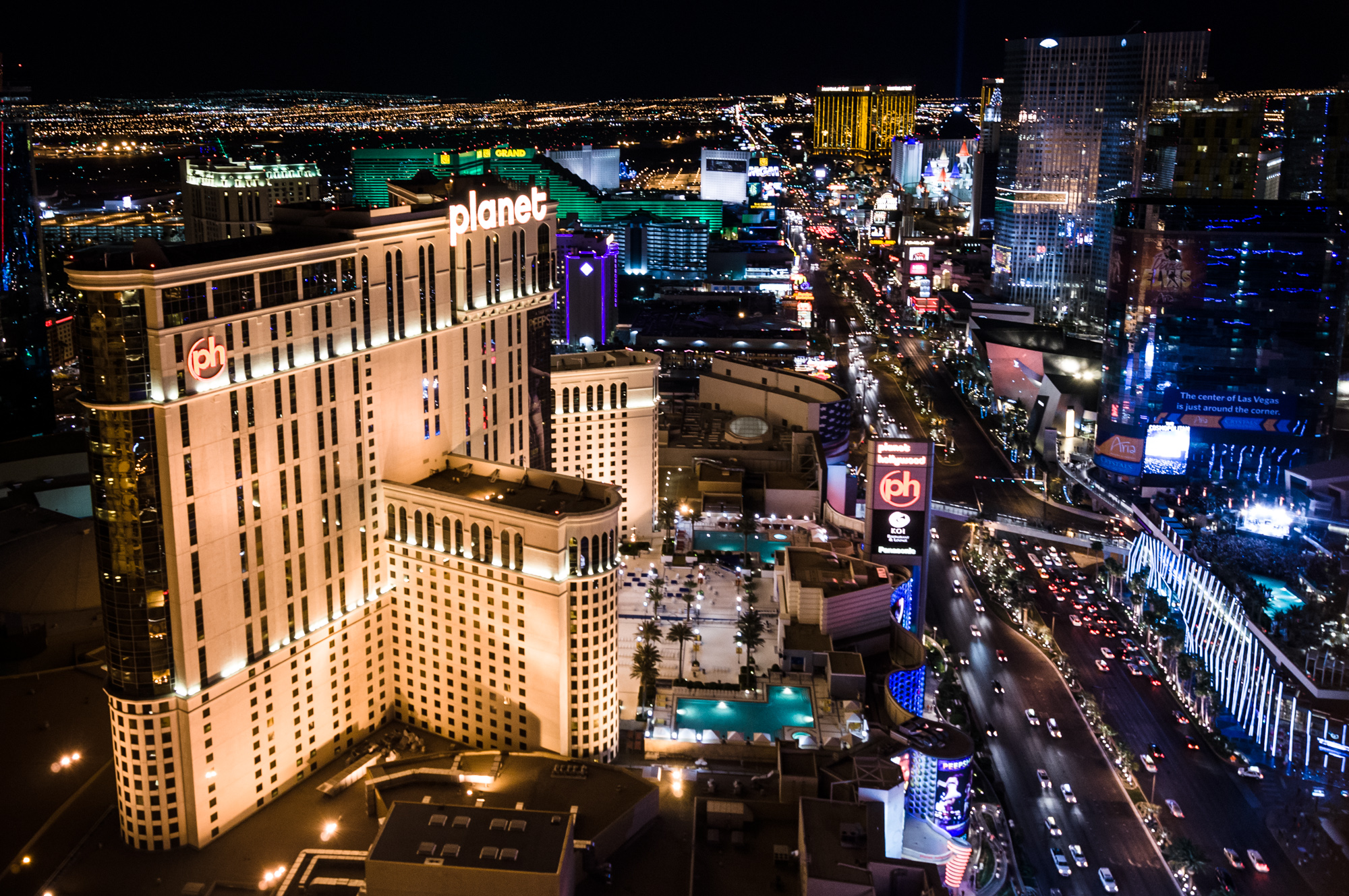
An aerial view of Las Vegas Boulevard as seen from atop Paris Las Vegas as seen in 2012

Las Vegas Boulevard serves as the Valley's east/west address demarcation boundary line south of The Strat onwards. The road's own north/south street address demarcation boundary is located at its intersection with Fremont Street. Unlike most other cases, where using the more traditional nomenclature of putting the direction before the road name is common practice, The Boulevard is an exception, as it is rarely referred to as "North Las Vegas Boulevard" and "South Las Vegas Boulevard". The road instead is usually referred to as "Las Vegas Boulevard North" (abbreviated LVBN) and "Las Vegas Boulevard South" (stylized LVBS) by both residents and various media outlets.

At its northern end, the Boulevard starts at the south end of Moapa Paulite Solar Road. Running north of, but roughly parallel with I-15, it heads southwest toward Las Vegas, passing through an industrial complex of manufacturing plants and power plants running along the Union Pacific Railroad line in Apex. Traveling south, the road meets Nellis Air Force Base on the east side and the Las Vegas Motor Speedway on the west side.

As the road enters the city of North Las Vegas, it passes through some of the older commercial areas in the region. As the road approaches the city of Las Vegas proper, some of what historical Las Vegas became visible, as some of the older casinos appear along with some of the more famous and long-operating strip clubs.

Upon entering the city limits of Las Vegas, the Boulevard showcases the area's past with many museums, including the Old Las Vegas Mormon Fort State Historic Park, the Neon Museum and the Fremont Street Experience and downtown casino sector. On crossing Washington Avenue, the Boulevard is designated as the Downtown Las Vegas Boulevard Scenic Byway by the state. This designation continues south to Sahara Avenue.

Further south is a stretch of road that has many of the older motels, bars and wedding chapels that were among the high points of the old Vegas before the era of the megaresorts.

=== Las Vegas Strip ===
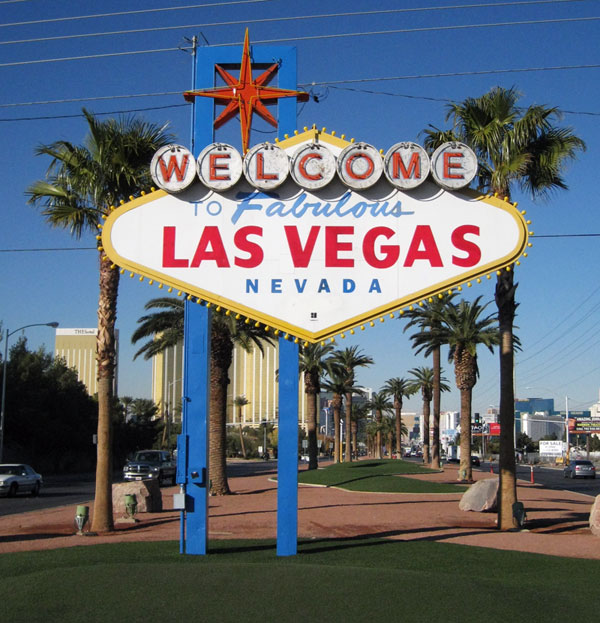
Welcome to Fabulous Las Vegas sign, picture taken looking north up the strip as seen in 2009

The Boulevard leaves the city of Las Vegas at Sahara Avenue and assumes its unofficial name the Las Vegas Strip for the next 4 miles (6.4 km). This portion of Las Vegas Boulevard begins a few blocks to the north at The Strat (the only major Strip hotel/casino sited within the Las Vegas city limits) and runs through Winchester and Paradise with the Strip technically ending at Russell Road. This is the section of the road most people are familiar with; it is home to casino megaresorts with their world-famous lights, huge video signs and other attractions. It is designated as an All-American Road. Just past the end of "The Strip", the road passes the Welcome to Fabulous Las Vegas sign (located in the median) as it abuts the western edge of the Harry Reid International Airport property. The sign is often considered the south end of the Strip.

"South Strip" is now used to describe the section of Las Vegas Boulevard between Russell Road and Blue Diamond Road. Along this stretch, development thins out, except for newer shopping malls, hotels, resorts, casinos and condominiums (such as South Point Hotel, Casino & Spa and The Grandview at Las Vegas) as the Boulevard continues to travel south, just to the east of Interstate 15.

After passing the M Resort, the Boulevard enters rural desert areas. It continues to parallel Interstate 15 and eventually arrives at Jean. South of Jean, the road ceases to be a major artery for a stretch of several miles before resuming just north of Primm, where it runs alongside two of the resort's hotels and shopping mall; just short of the Nevada/California state line, the road changes its name to Lotto Store Road (appropriately serving a convenience store across the state line whose only purpose is to sell California State Lottery tickets to Nevadans), then loops around the shopping mall as Fashion Outlet Way before ending at Primm Valley Boulevard.

== Traffic Safety ==
As part of its Vision Zero initiative, the City of Las Vegas has identified Las Vegas Boulevard (the Strip) as one of the most dangerous corridors for traffic safety. The Vision Zero program emphasizes reducing serious injuries and fatalities through a combination of enforcement, engineering, and education. Las Vegas Boulevard has consistently stood out as a high-risk area due to heavy vehicle traffic, nightlife activity, and widespread alcohol consumption, all factors that contribute to elevated crash rates compared to other parts of the city.

To address these risks, law enforcement has implemented aggressive DUI enforcement. The Las Vegas Metropolitan Police Department (LVMPD) deploys dedicated saturation patrols, strike teams and mobile DUI processing units along the Strip and surrounding areas. In fiscal year 2024, the Nevada Office of Traffic Safety allocated more than $900,000 in federal funding for weekend, holiday and special-event patrols. Between October 2023 and September 2024, these efforts led to 1,550 impaired driving arrests and over 2,100 standardized field sobriety tests administered.

Crash records further underscore the scale of the problem. An analysis of Nevada Department of Transportation (NDOT) data from April 2018 to November 2023 identified South Las Vegas Boulevard as the most dangerous roadway for DUI crashes in the Las Vegas metro area, with 425 DUI crashes and 313 injuries recorded during that period.

Pedestrian safety is another pressing concern. Research from the University of Nevada, Las Vegas (UNLV) Transportation Research Center highlights consistently high pedestrian crash rates along the Strip, linked to heavy foot traffic, mid-block crossings and limited physical separation between vehicles and pedestrians. In response, the Clark County Department of Public Works has invested in safety infrastructure, including elevated pedestrian bridges and extended median barriers to reduce conflicts between vehicles and pedestrians.

== Public transportation ==
RTC Transit Route(s) 113 (and the MAX, before February 2016, when it was decommissioned) serves the road from Downtown Las Vegas north to Nellis Air Force Base, The Deuce serves the Road from Downtown Las Vegas south to Warm Springs and then to the South Strip Transfer Terminal (SSTT)). Route 117 serves the road south from the SSTT past the Las Vegas Premium Outlet South store, the South Point Hotel, Casino & Spa and Silverado Ranch Boulevard.

== History ==
Las Vegas Boulevard has had several names, including 5th Street (from Sahara to Owens, within the Las Vegas city limits), Main Street (in North Las Vegas), the Arrowhead Highway, Los Angeles Highway, Salt Lake Highway, US 91 (entire segment), US 93 (from Fremont Street north), US 466 (from Jean to Fremont Street, including the Las Vegas Strip) and State Route 6 (entire segment, unsigned).

South of the city, Las Vegas Boulevard was commonly known as the Los Angeles Highway.

Just north of Jean is the place where the last spike on the Los Angeles and Salt Lake Railroad line was driven.

With the construction of I-15, Las Vegas Boulevard went from being the main through road to one that only served as a city street for locals and tourists. Its current name, in effect since 1959, reflects its importance to the Valley rather than past names when it served as a main intra-city road.

On October 16, 2009, the Federal Highway Administration announced the designation of a new National Scenic Byway on the boulevard. The 3.5-mile (5.6 km) section starting at Sahara Avenue and running north to Washington Avenue was designated the City of Las Vegas, Las Vegas Boulevard State Scenic Byway.

== 5th Street ==
5th Street
- Location: North Las Vegas
- Length: 7.71 mi (12.41 km)
- Existed: 1920s–present

Despite being renamed to Las Vegas Boulevard south of Owens Avenue, 5th Street still exists in North Las Vegas. Beginning at a roundabout with Las Vegas Boulevard and Main Street (former SR 601), 5th Street heads due north at nearly the same latitude as Las Vegas Boulevard (north of Downtown Las Vegas but south of said roundabout), serving as North Las Vegas' primary north–south corridor. After crossing Lake Mead Boulevard and Carey Avenue, 5th Street overpasses I-15, the Union Pacific Railroad's Caliente Subdivision tracks, and Losee Road before lowering down to surface level. It then intersects Cheyenne Avenue (SR 574), Craig Road, and Ann Road. After an interchange with the Las Vegas Beltway (CC 215), 5th Street heads into the new Villages at Tule Springs community.

Between Lake Mead South Boulevard and the Las Vegas Beltway, 5th Street is part of the National Highway System, a network of highways that are considered essential to the country's economy, defense, and mobility by the Federal Highway Administration.

=== History ===
Between Owens Avenue and Sahara Avenue, 5th Street existed as part of the grid network of Downtown Las Vegas. In 1959, that portion was officially named "Las Vegas Boulevard"; presumably, between that time and its conception, 5th Street was extended into North Las Vegas. The intersection of Lake Mead Boulevard and 5th Street is the site of the NLV Gateway, a new mixed-use development located in the city's downtown. Its most recent extension came in August 2026, when it was extended into the under-construction master-planned community of The Villages at Tule Springs, passing nearby Tule Springs Fossil Beds National Monument.

=== Public transportation ===
Although no transit routes exist on 5th Street as of October 2026, the City of North Las Vegas and the Regional Transportation Commission of Southern Nevada are planning to add a rapid transit route along the corridor, with the route likely being either bus rapid transit or light rail transit.

== See also ==
- Las Vegas Strip
- Tropicana – Las Vegas Boulevard intersection

Preceded by Gardner's Ranch	Nevada Historical Markers; 195	Succeeded by Carson City Mint
