= Spaghetti Bowl (Las Vegas) =

Interchange in Nevada

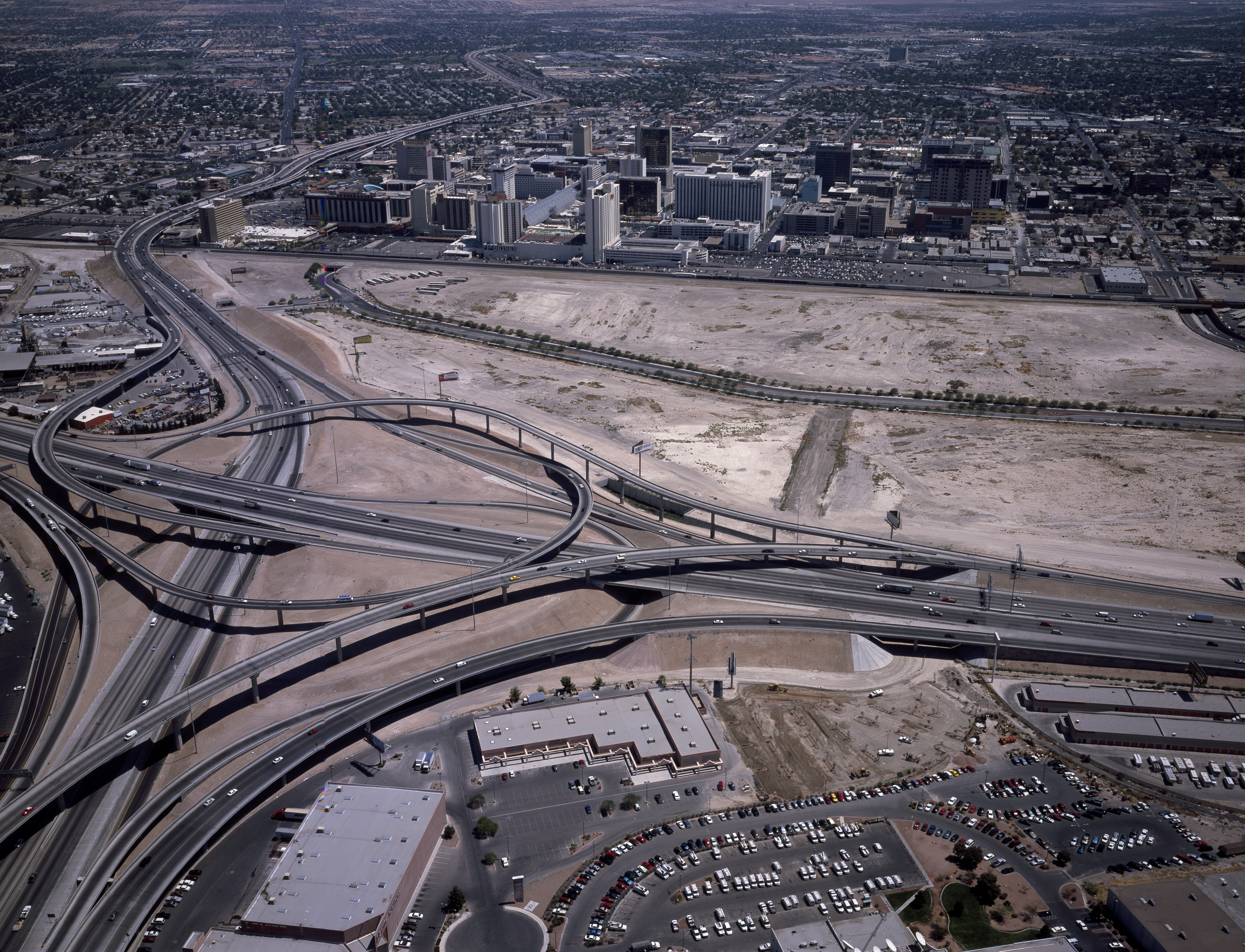
- Aerial view of the interchange in 2001, facing east towards Downtown Las Vegas
- Interactive map of Spaghetti Bowl

Location
- Las Vegas, Nevada, U.S.
- Coordinates: 36.174119°N 115.155644°W
- Roads at junction: I-11 / US 95; I-15; US 93; Martin L. King Boulevard

Construction
- Type: Interchange
- Constructed: 1960s and 1999–2000
- Opened: 1968; 58 years ago
- Maintained by: NDOT

The Spaghetti Bowl is the colloquial name for a freeway interchange in downtown Las Vegas, Nevada. It is the system interchange between Interstate 11 / U.S. Route 95, Interstate 15 and U.S. Route 93, which also includes a service interchange with Martin Luther King Boulevard.

The interchange, which was substantially rebuilt between 1999 and 2000, carries more than 300,000 cars and trucks per day as of 2019.

== History ==
The original Spaghetti Bowl was constructed in the mid 1960s by Kiewit Corporation and was completed by 1968. Upon completion, the interchange connected I-15 to the new, cross-town Las Vegas Expressway. That highway, which carried US 95 (relocated from Bonanza Road) and was later renamed in honor of Oran K. Gragson, served as a mile-long spur to Las Vegas Boulevard in downtown Las Vegas on the east and eventually served as a new bypass of Rancho Drive for US 95 traffic to the west and north.

Between 1982 and 1994, the US 95 freeway was extended to the east (concurrent with US 93) past downtown and then southeast toward Henderson, Nevada, eventually being co-designated as I-515. Also in the 1980s, new interchanges, including one with a new feeder freeway, the Summerlin Parkway, were constructed along the US 95 Gragson Freeway to the west and northwest of the Spaghetti Bowl. The increased traffic on the cross-town freeway left the I-15 interchange, with its two loop ramps, several closely spaced ramps and no ramp wider than one lane, totally inadequate; it had been designed to carry only about 60,000 vehicles a day.

In the late 1990s, NDOT began a reconstruction project at the interchange, with new, wider ramps and elimination of the loops. By November 1999, ramps had been built and opened to provide access in all directions to and from nearby Martin Luther King Boulevard (except for an onramp to US 95 north), which had only partial access in the prior configuration. The overall project was completed in August 2000 with the opening of the new flyovers and other reconfigured freeway-to-freeway ramps.

On May 22, 2015, there was a magnitude 4.8 earthquake several miles north of Las Vegas near the town of Caliente. This earthquake caused what appeared to be damage to the southbound US 95 ramp to southbound Interstate 15 and the Nevada Highway Patrol shut down the ramp around 12:20 p.m. local time. Upon further inspection by the Nevada Department of Transportation (NDOT), the quake dislodged protective rubber encasing a previously-damaged bridge joint. With no structural damage caused by the earthquake, the ramp was reopened around 5:00 p.m. the same day.

On May 21, 2024, US 95 was re–designated as I-11 by NDOT due to an expansion in Nevada, linking Las Vegas, Phoenix and Reno after the American Association of State Highway and Transportation Officials (AASHTO) approved the I-11 designation in October 2022 along with the Federal Highway Administration (FHWA) on November 24, 2023.

=== Project Neon ===
HOV connectors were added from I-15 north to US 95 north and from US 95 south to I-15 south in 2019.

South of the interchange, collector-distributor roads were constructed to eliminate traffic bottleneck and weaving on I-15 south between the Charleston Boulevard and Sahara Avenue interchanges and the US 95 ramps.
