= Nellis Air Force Base (city) =

Nellis Air Force Base CDP
- Census-Designated Place
- Nellis Air Force Base Census-Designated Place
- Location within Nevada Location within the United States
- Coordinates: 36.24607°S 115.05721°W
- Country: United States
- State: Nevada
- County: Clark
- Metropolitan area: Las Vegas Valley
- Elevation: 1,890 ft (576 m)

Population (May 14, 2011)
  - Total: 3,187
- Time zone: UTC−08:00 (PST)
  - Summer (DST): UTC−07:00 (PDT)

Nellis Air Force Base is a city in the United States. It is located in Clark County and the state of Nevada northeast of Las Vegas, 3,300 km (2,100 mi) west of the country's capital city of Washington, D.C. Nellis Air Force Base is located at an elevation of 576 meters (1,890 ft) above sea level and has a population of 3,187.

The land around Nellis Air Force Base is flat to the west, but to the east, it is hilly. (Note: Calculated from the interpolation of all height data (DEM 3") from Viewfinder Panoramas, within a 10-kilometer (6.2 mi) radius. The full algorithm is available here.) The highest point in the area is Frenchman Mountain, 1,205 meters (3,953 ft) above sea level, 9.1 km (5.7 mi) southeast of Nellis Air Force Base. (Note: The highest point above the local horizon, according to GeoNames elevation data.) The population of the Nellis Air Force Base CDP is 2,915 inhabitants per square kilometer (7,550 inhabitants per square mile). The nearest large city is Las Vegas, 10.7 km (6.6 mi) southwest of Nellis Air Force Base. The area surrounding Nellis is dominated by houses. In the region around Nellis Air Force Base, springs and other resources are unusually common. (Note: More than 20 kilometers (12 mi) away compared to the average density on Earth, according to GeoNames.)

The climate is hot and humid. The average temperature is 23 °C (73 °F). The hottest month is July, at 37 °C (99 °F); the coldest is January, at 8 °C (46 °F). The average annual rainfall is 133 millimeters (5.2 in). The wettest month is September, with 26 millimeters (1.0 in) of rain; the driest is June, with 1 millimeter (0.039 in).
