= Glendale, Nevada =

Unincorporated community in Nevada, United States

Glendale
- Unincorporated community
- Location within the state of Nevada
- Coordinates: 36°39′55″N 114°34′00″W
- Country: United States
- State: Nevada
- County: Clark

Population (2000)
  - Total: 4
- Time zone: UTC-8 (Pacific (PST))
  - Summer (DST): UTC-7 (PDT)
- Area codes: 702 and 725

Glendale is an unincorporated community and former town in Clark County, Nevada, United States. The community is at an elevation of 1,519 feet (463 m).

Glendale was settled in 1855. The community was named for the valley in which it is situated. It was formally established as an unincorporated town in 1979. At that time, it consisted entirely of land owned by Charlie Hester, who operated a motel, gas station, and restaurant. The town's population peaked at 36, mainly comprising Hester's family and employees.

In 1996, county commissioners approved a plan to redevelop Glendale as a casino resort with 600 hotel rooms, despite objections from residents of nearby Moapa Valley; the project was never realized.

The town was dissolved in 2001, because its population had declined to four, making it impossible to fill the five seats on the town board. Glendale later became part of the unincorporated town of Moapa Valley. In 2009, the town boundaries were shifted, making Glendale part of Moapa.
