= Apex landfill =

Landfill in Apex, Nevada, United States

Coordinates: 36.309938°N 114.947419°W

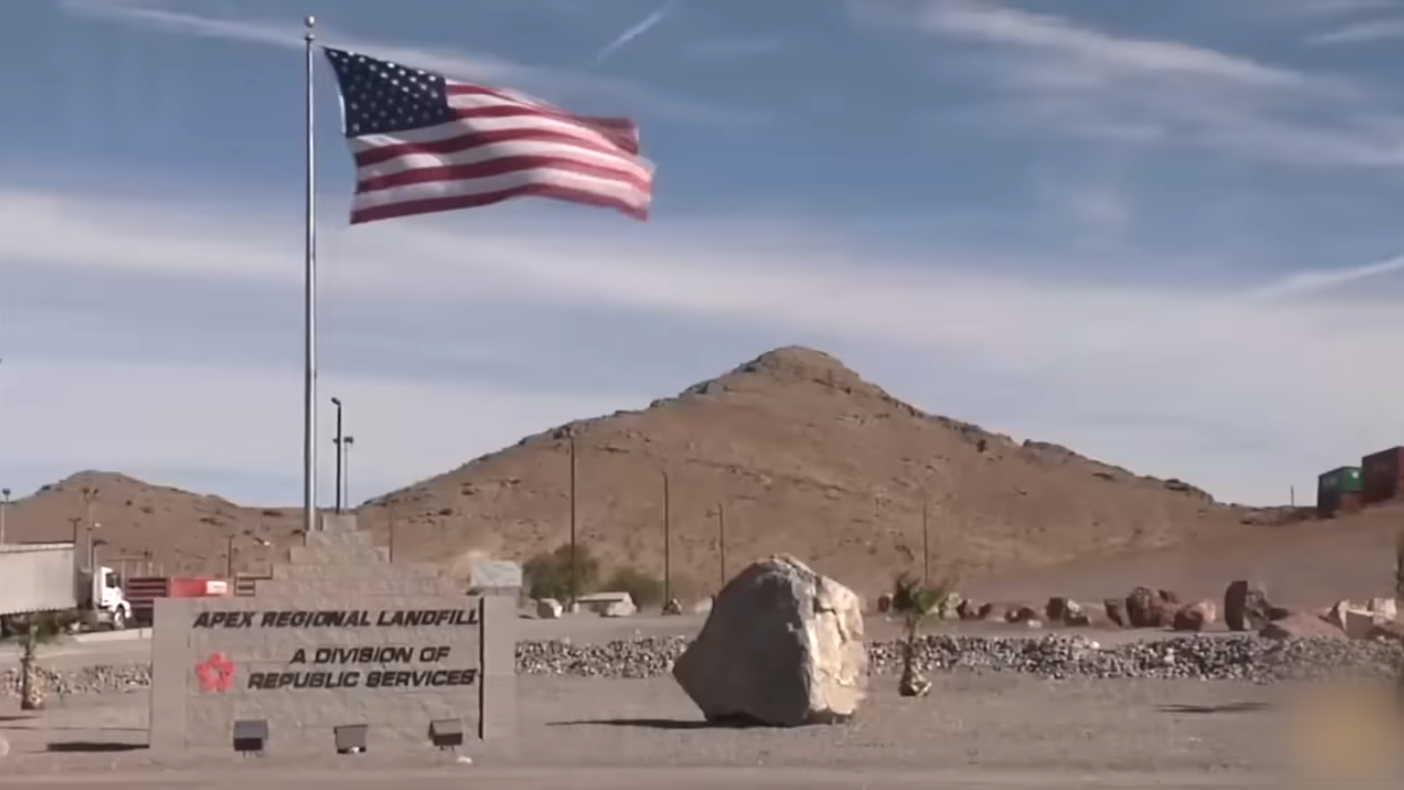
Entrance to Apex Regional Landfill

Apex Regional Landfill is a landfill located in Clark County, Nevada. It is the largest landfill in the world by area and volume. At its peak, it could accept 15,000 tons of waste per day. It is expected to be able to accept waste for over 250 years at current rates. It is owned by Republic Services. It is located just outside the city limits of North Las Vegas.

Located northeast of I-15 near the junction with U.S. Route 93, the Apex Landfill is 9 km^{2}. Republic Services owns and operates the landfill. Arrolime, Nevada is located about two miles (3.2 km) northeast of Apex.
