= List of Great Basin watersheds =

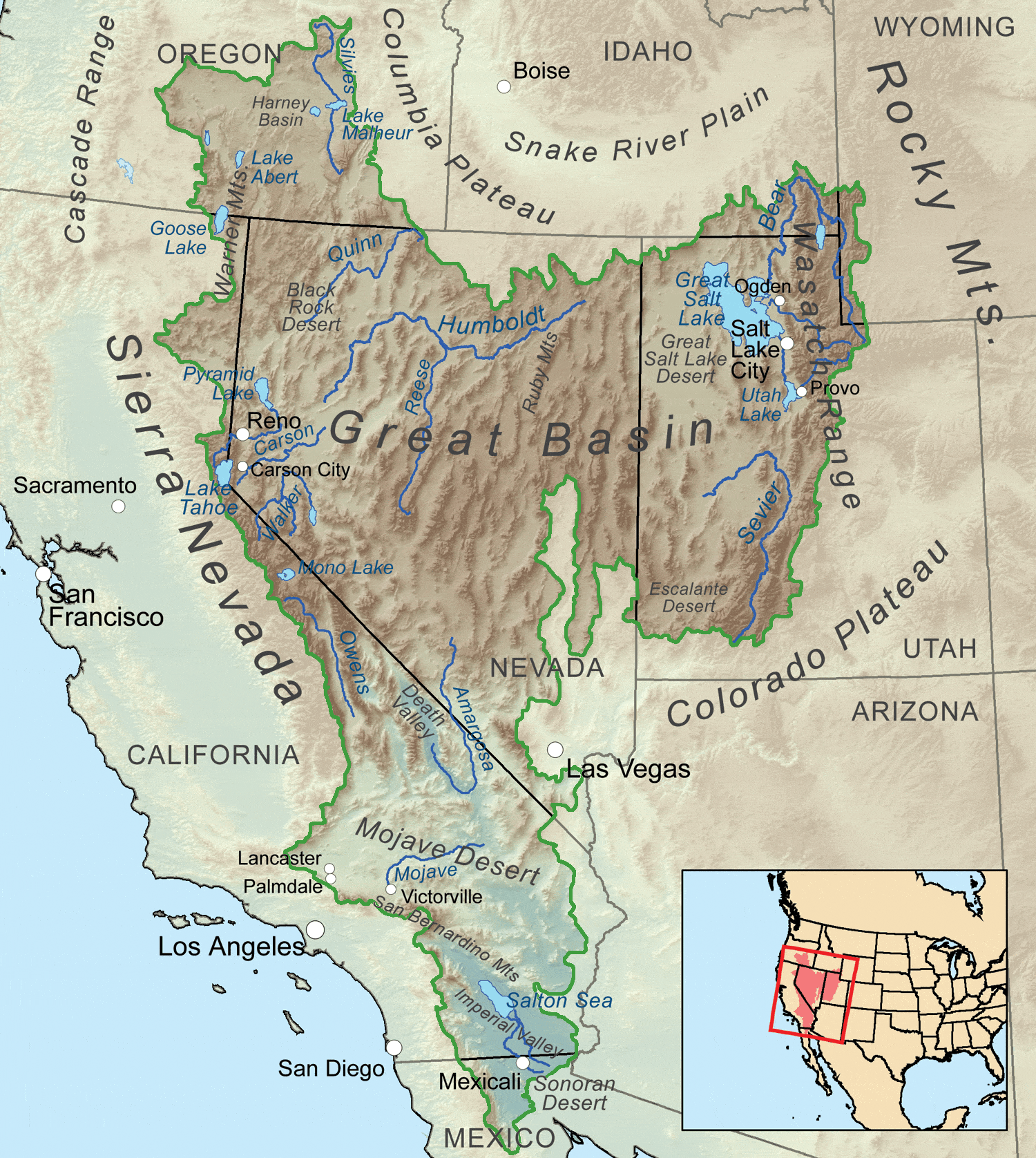
Map of the Great Basin

The Great Basin is the largest region of contiguous endorheic drainage basins in North America, and is encompassed by the Great Basin Divide. This is a list of the drainage basins in the Great Basin that are over 500 sq mi (1,300 km^{2}), listed by the state containing most of the basin.

== Utah ==
- Great Salt Lake (Idaho, Utah, Wyoming) 19,162 sq mi (49,630 km^{2})
  - Bear River (Idaho, Utah, Wyoming) 7,561 sq mi (19,580 km^{2})
    - Malad River (Idaho, Utah) 768 sq mi (1,990 km^{2})
    - Little Bear River (Idaho, Utah) 884 sq mi (2,290 km^{2})
    - Bear Lake (Idaho, Utah) 605 sq mi (1,570 km^{2})
  - Weber River (Utah, Wyoming) 2,093 sq mi (5,420 km^{2})
  - Jordan River (Utah) 3,551 sq mi (9,200 km^{2})
    - Utah Lake (Utah) 2,536 sq mi (6,570 km^{2})
      - Provo River (Utah) 686 sq mi (1,780 km^{2})
      - Spanish Fork (Utah) 825 sq mi (2,140 km^{2})
  - Skull Valley (Utah) 814 sq mi (2,110 km^{2})
  - Deep Creek (Curlew Valley) (Idaho, Utah) 1,033 sq mi (2,680 km^{2})
- Pine Valley (Utah) 733 sq mi (1,900 km^{2})
- Tule Valley (Utah) 951 sq mi (2,460 km^{2})
- Rush Valley (Utah) 722 sq mi (1,870 km^{2})
- Bonneville Salt Flats (Nevada, Utah) 8,602 sq mi (22,280 km^{2})
  - Fish Springs Wash (Utah) 933 sq mi (2,420 km^{2})
  - Snake Valley (Nevada, Utah) 3,119 sq mi (8,080 km^{2})
    - Hamlin Valley (Nevada, Utah) 884 sq mi (2,290 km^{2})
  - Deep Creek (Deep Creek Valley) (Nevada, Utah) 501 sq mi (1,300 km^{2})
- Newfoundland Evaporation Basin (Nevada, Utah) 4,516 sq mi (11,700 km^{2})
  - Grouse Creek (Nevada, Utah) 2,755 sq mi (7,140 km^{2})
    - Thousand Springs Creek (Nevada, Utah) 1,534 sq mi (3,970 km^{2})
- Sevier Lake (Utah) 9,387 sq mi (24,310 km^{2})
  - Sevier River (Utah) 8,591 sq mi (22,250 km^{2})
    - Beaver River (Utah) 1,996 sq mi (5,170 km^{2})
    - San Pitch River (Utah) 861 sq mi (2,230 km^{2})
    - East Fork Sevier River (Utah) 1,242 sq mi (3,220 km^{2})
- Pavant Valley (Utah) 1,108 sq mi (2,870 km^{2}) Most of Pavant Valley drains to the Sevier River artificially via the Central Utah Canal.
- Sevier Desert (Utah) 1,029 sq mi (2,670 km^{2})
- Mud Spring Wash (Utah) 1,053 sq mi (2,730 km^{2})
  - Little Salt Lake (Utah) 503 sq mi (1,300 km^{2})
- Escalante Desert (Nevada, Utah) 1,442 sq mi (3,730 km^{2})
- Wah Wah Valley (Utah) 600 sq mi (1,600 km^{2})

== Nevada ==
- Carson Sink (California, Nevada) 19,839 sq mi (51,380 km^{2})
  - Humboldt River (Nevada) 16,753 sq mi (43,390 km^{2})
    - Little Humboldt River 1,780 sq mi (4,600 km^{2})
    - Reese River (Nevada) 2,377 sq mi (6,160 km^{2})
      - Cain Creek (Nevada) 519 sq mi (1,340 km^{2})
    - Rock Creek (Nevada) 746 sq mi (1,930 km^{2})
    - Coyote Creek (Crescent Valley) (Nevada) 1,171 sq mi (3,030 km^{2})
      - Cooks Creek (Nevada) 637 sq mi (1,650 km^{2})
    - Pine Creek (Nevada) 1,005 sq mi (2,600 km^{2})
    - South Fork Humboldt River (Nevada) 1,306 sq mi (3,380 km^{2})
      - Huntington Creek (Nevada) 795 sq mi (2,060 km^{2})
    - North Fork Humboldt River (Nevada) 998 sq mi (2,580 km^{2})
    - Marys River (Nevada) 514 sq mi (1,330 km^{2})
  - Carson River (California, Nevada) 2,585 sq mi (6,700 km^{2})
    - East Fork Carson River (California, Nevada) 572 sq mi (1,480 km^{2})
- Stillwater Marsh (Nevada) 854 sq mi (2,210 km^{2})
- Black Rock Desert (Nevada, Oregon) 8,509 sq mi (22,040 km^{2})
  - Quinn River (Nevada, Oregon) 7,590 sq mi (19,700 km^{2})
    - Bottle Creek Slough (Desert Valley) (Nevada) 540 sq mi (1,400 km^{2})
- High Rock Lake (Nevada) 665 sq mi (1,720 km^{2})
- Smoke Creek Desert (California, Nevada) 1,261 sq mi (3,270 km^{2})
- Duck Lake (California, Nevada) 573 sq mi (1,480 km^{2})
- Thousand Creek (Nevada, Oregon) 1,037 sq mi (2,690 km^{2})
- Pyramid Lake (California, Nevada) 3,112 sq mi (8,060 km^{2})
  - Truckee River (California, Nevada) 2,332 sq mi (6,040 km^{2})
    - Lake Tahoe (California, Nevada) 507 sq mi (1,310 km^{2})
- Blue Wing Flat (Granite Springs Valley) (Nevada) 975 sq mi (2,530 km^{2})
- Walker Lake (California, Nevada) 3,561 sq mi (9,220 km^{2})
  - Walker River (California, Nevada) 2,753 sq mi (7,130 km^{2})
    - East Walker River (California, Nevada) 1,201 sq mi (3,110 km^{2})
    - West Walker River (California, Nevada) 859 sq mi (2,220 km^{2})
- Buffalo Valley (Nevada) 500 sq mi (1,300 km^{2})
- Buena Vista Valley (Nevada) 736 sq mi (1,910 km^{2})
- Humboldt Salt Marsh (Nevada) 2,083 sq mi (5,390 km^{2})
  - Spring Creek (Nevada) 801 sq mi (2,070 km^{2})
- Gabbs Valley (Nevada) 1,273 sq mi (3,300 km^{2})
- Big Smoky Valley (Nevada) 2,049 sq mi (5,310 km^{2})
  - Peavine Creek (Nevada) 1,727 sq mi (4,470 km^{2})
    - Ione Valley (Nevada) 673 sq mi (1,740 km^{2})
- Grass Valley (Nevada) 592 sq mi (1,530 km^{2})
- Rock Creek (Nevada) 590 sq mi (1,500 km^{2})
- Wadsworth Creek (Monitor Valley) (Nevada) 525 sq mi (1,360 km^{2})
- Diamond Valley (Nevada) 2,598 sq mi (6,730 km^{2})
  - Slough Creek (Nevada) 2,272 sq mi (5,880 km^{2})
    - Antelope Wash (Nevada) 560 sq mi (1,500 km^{2})
    - Coils Creek (Nevada) 987 sq mi (2,560 km^{2})
      - Stoneberger Creek (Nevada) 749 sq mi (1,940 km^{2})
- Newark Lake (Nevada) 1,444 sq mi (3,740 km^{2})
  - Fish Creek (Nevada) 623 sq mi (1,610 km^{2})
- Long Valley (Nevada) 647 sq mi (1,680 km^{2})
- Franklin Lake (Nevada) 648 sq mi (1,680 km^{2})
- Cole Creek (Independence Valley) (Nevada) 1,025 sq mi (2,650 km^{2})
- Yelland Dry Lake (Nevada) 1,191 sq mi (3,080 km^{2})
  - Spring Valley Creek (Nevada) 694 sq mi (1,800 km^{2})
- Goshute Lake (Nevada) 1,809 sq mi (4,690 km^{2})
  - Duck Creek (Nevada) 1,510 sq mi (3,900 km^{2})
- Goshute Valley (Nevada) 1,504 sq mi (3,900 km^{2})
- Lake Valley (Nevada) 554 sq mi (1,430 km^{2})
- Dry Lake Valley (Nevada) 897 sq mi (2,320 km^{2})
- Fish Lake Valley (California, Nevada) 983 sq mi (2,550 km^{2})
- Mud Lake (Nevada) 1,963 sq mi (5,080 km^{2})
  - Stone Cabin Creek (Nevada) 998 sq mi (2,580 km^{2})
  - Ralston Valley (Nevada) 747 sq mi (1,930 km^{2})
- Clayton Valley (Nevada) 555 sq mi (1,440 km^{2})
- Butterfield Marsh (Nevada) 3,780 sq mi (9,800 km^{2})
  - Railroad Valley (Nevada) 1,959 sq mi (5,070 km^{2})
    - Hot Creek (Nevada) 1,061 sq mi (2,750 km^{2})
  - Duckwater Creek (Nevada) 904 sq mi (2,340 km^{2})
- Sand Springs Wash (Nevada) 507 sq mi (1,310 km^{2})
- Gold Flat (Nevada) 685 sq mi (1,770 km^{2})
- Sarcobatus Flat (Nevada) 1,237 sq mi (3,200 km^{2})
  - China Wash (Lida Valley) (Nevada) 538 sq mi (1,390 km^{2})
- Coal Valley (Nevada) 952 sq mi (2,470 km^{2})
- Sand Spring Valley (Nevada) 699 sq mi (1,810 km^{2})
- Groom Lake (Nevada) 669 sq mi (1,730 km^{2})
- Desert Valley (Nevada) 990 sq mi (2,600 km^{2})
  - Tikaboo Valley (Nevada) 615 sq mi (1,590 km^{2})
- Indian Springs Valley (Nevada) 661 sq mi (1,710 km^{2})
- Mesquite Valley (California, Nevada) 504 sq mi (1,310 km^{2})
- Eldorado Valley (Nevada) 534 sq mi (1,380 km^{2})

== Oregon ==
- Malheur Lake (Oregon) 3,062 sq mi (7,930 km^{2})
  - Malheur Slough (Oregon) 514 sq mi (1,330 km^{2})
  - Silvies River (Oregon) 1,319 sq mi (3,420 km^{2})
  - Donner und Blitzen River (Oregon) 790 sq mi (2,000 km^{2})
- Harney Lake (Oregon) 1,810 sq mi (4,700 km^{2})
  - Silver Creek (Oregon) 1,502 sq mi (3,890 km^{2})
- Silver Lake (Oregon) 798 sq mi (2,070 km^{2})
  - Silver Creek (Oregon) 677 sq mi (1,750 km^{2})
- Lake Abert (Oregon) 897 sq mi (2,320 km^{2})
  - Chewaucan River (Oregon) 628 sq mi (1,630 km^{2})
- Bluejoint Lake (Warner Lakes) (California, Nevada, Oregon) 1,896 sq mi (4,910 km^{2})
  - Crump Lake (California, Nevada, Oregon) 1,084 sq mi (2,810 km^{2})
- Guano Lake (Nevada, Oregon) 916 sq mi (2,370 km^{2})
- Catlow Valley (Oregon) 1,352 sq mi (3,500 km^{2})
  - Guano Slough (Oregon) 501 sq mi (1,300 km^{2})
- Alvord Lake (Nevada, Oregon) 706 sq mi (1,830 km^{2})

== California ==
- Goose Lake (California, Oregon) 1,088 sq mi (2,820 km^{2})
- Madeline Plains (California, Nevada) 714 sq mi (1,850 km^{2})
- Honey Lake (California, Nevada) 1,905 sq mi (4,930 km^{2})
  - Susan River (California) 1,073 sq mi (2,780 km^{2})
- Mono Lake (California, Nevada) 785 sq mi (2,030 km^{2})
- Owens Lake (California, Nevada) 3,501 sq mi (9,070 km^{2})
  - Owens River (California, Nevada) 2,903 sq mi (7,520 km^{2})
    - Spring Canyon Creek (California, Nevada) 743 sq mi (1,920 km^{2})
- Eureka Valley (California, Nevada) 564 sq mi (1,460 km^{2})
- Salt Lake (California) 742 sq mi (1,920 km^{2})
- Amargosa River (California, Nevada) 8,785 sq mi (22,750 km^{2})
  - Salt Creek (California, Nevada) 2,307 sq mi (5,980 km^{2})
    - Death Valley Wash (California, Nevada) 1,496 sq mi (3,870 km^{2})
  - Salt Creek (California) 1,330 sq mi (3,400 km^{2})
    - Kingston Wash (California) 537 sq mi (1,390 km^{2})
  - Rock Valley (California, Nevada) 655 sq mi (1,700 km^{2})
  - Fortymile Canyon (California, Nevada) 1,769 sq mi (4,580 km^{2})
- Panamint Valley (northern) (California) 570 sq mi (1,500 km^{2})
- Panamint Valley (southern) (California) 916 sq mi (2,370 km^{2})
- China Lake (California) 1,175 sq mi (3,040 km^{2})
- Searles Lake (California) 710 sq mi (1,800 km^{2})
- Koehn Lake (California) 896 sq mi (2,320 km^{2})
- Rogers Dry Lake (California) 831 sq mi (2,150 km^{2})
- Rosamond Lake (California) 1,098 sq mi (2,840 km^{2})
- Harper Lake (California) 765 sq mi (1,980 km^{2})
- Silver Lake 2,474 sq mi (6,410 km^{2})
  - Soda Lake 2,309 sq mi (5,980 km^{2})
    - Mojave River (California) 1,709 sq mi (4,430 km^{2})
    - Kelso Wash (California) 727 sq mi (1,880 km^{2})
- Ivanpah Lake (California, Nevada) 820 sq mi (2,100 km^{2})
- Dale Lake (California) 544 sq mi (1,410 km^{2})
- Bristol Lake (California) 713 sq mi (1,850 km^{2})
- Cadiz Lake (California) 1,639 sq mi (4,240 km^{2})
  - Schuyler Wash (California) 1,057 sq mi (2,740 km^{2})
    - Watson Wash (California) 533 sq mi (1,380 km^{2})
- Danby Lake (California) 1,110 sq mi (2,900 km^{2})
  - Homer Wash (California) 544 sq mi (1,410 km^{2})
- Ford Dry Lake (California) 2,066 sq mi (5,350 km^{2})
  - Palen Lake (California) 1,377 sq mi (3,570 km^{2})
    - Pinto Wash (California) 709 sq mi (1,840 km^{2})
- Salton Sea (California, Mexico) 6,022 sq mi (15,600 km^{2}) - basin is known as the Salton Sink
  - Whitewater River (California) 1,501 sq mi (3,890 km^{2})
  - San Felipe Creek (California, Mexico) 1,481 sq mi (3,840 km^{2})
    - Carrizo Creek (California, Mexico) 570 sq mi (1,500 km^{2})
  - New River (California, Mexico) 664 sq mi (1,720 km^{2})
  - Alamo River (California, Mexico) 647 sq mi (1,680 km^{2})
- Lake Elsinore (California) 750 sq mi (1,900 km^{2})
  - San Jacinto River 765 sq mi (1,980 km^{2})

== Mexico ==
- Laguna Salada (Mexico) 1,680 sq mi (4,400 km^{2})

== Sources ==
- "National Data" (Geodatabase file (GDB) with ZIP compression). www.ncgc.nrcs.usda.gov (FTP). (To view documents see Help:FTP)
- Champlin Peak Quadrangle - Utah (Map). 1 : 24,000. 7,5 Minute Series (Topographic). United States Geological Survey. 2001.
- "HYDRO1k Basins data" (Shapefile with TAR compression). USGS, Center for Earth Resources Observation and Science.

For an explanation of hydrologic unit numbers, see Hydrologic unit system (United States). The Great Basin is administratively split across three different USGS water resource regions (16 - Great Basin water resource region, 18 - California water resource region, and 17 - Pacific Northwest water resource region) and part of Mexico.

== See also ==
- List of rivers of the Great Basin
- Landforms of the Great Basin
- Watersheds of the United States
