= List of rivers of Nevada =

List of rivers of Nevada (U.S. state).

== By drainage basin ==
This list is arranged by drainage basin, with respective tributaries indented under each larger stream's name.

=== Great Basin ===
- Amargosa River
- Carson River
- Humboldt River
  - Little Humboldt River
  - Reese River
  - South Fork Humboldt River
    - Huntington Creek
  - North Fork Humboldt River
  - Marys River
- Quinn River
  - Kings River
- Thousand Springs Creek
- Truckee River
- Walker River
  - East Walker River
  - West Walker River

=== Pacific Ocean ===
==== Columbia watershed ====
- Columbia River (OR)
  - Snake River (ID)
    - Owyhee River
      - South Fork Owyhee River
        - Little Owyhee River
    - Bruneau River
      - Jarbidge River
    - Salmon Falls Creek

==== Colorado watershed ====
- Colorado River
  - Muddy River
    - Meadow Valley Wash
    - White River
  - Virgin River

== Alphabetically ==
- Amargosa River
- Bruneau River
- Carson River
- Colorado River
- Death Creek
- East Walker River
- Humboldt River
- Huntington Creek
- Jarbidge River
- Kings River
- Little Humboldt River
- Little Owyhee River
- Marys River
- Meadow Valley Wash
- Muddy River
- North Fork Humboldt River
- Owyhee River
- Quinn River
- Reese River
- Salmon Falls Creek
- South Fork Humboldt River
- South Fork Owyhee River
- Thousand Springs Creek
- Tongue Wash
- Truckee River
- Virgin River
- Walker River
- West Walker River
- White River

== See also ==
- List of Lake Tahoe inflow streams
- List of rivers in the Great Basin
- List of rivers of the United States
