= Walker River =

River in Nevada, United States

Walker River Againahukwa (Northern Paiute)
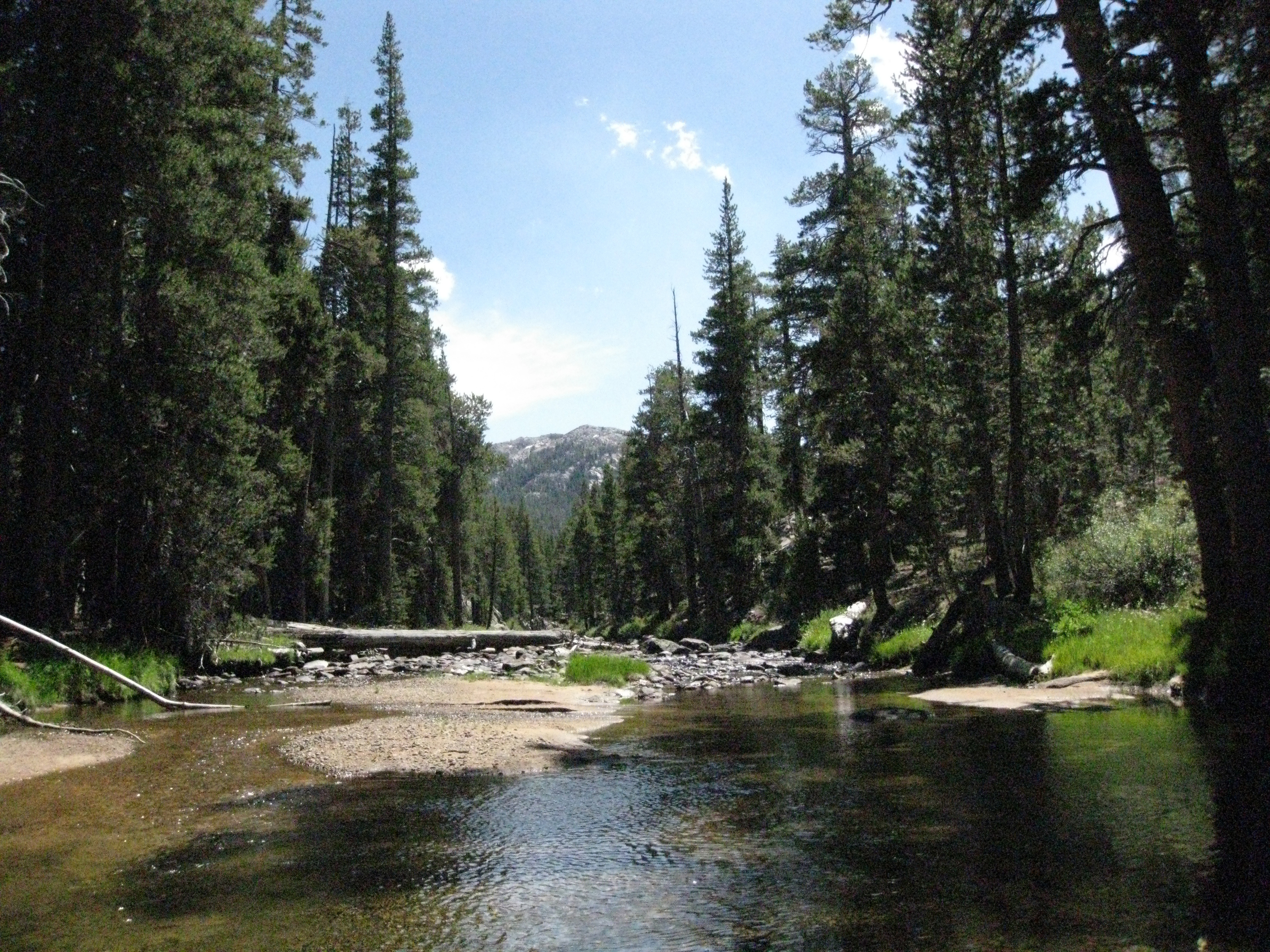
- West Walker River near Leavitt Meadows

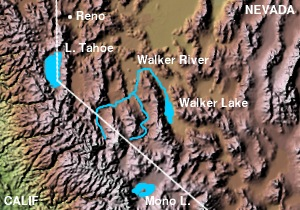
- Walker River and Walker Lake
- Native name: Againahukwa (Northern Paiute)

Location
- Country: United States
- State: Nevada
- Cities: Yerington, Mason, Wabuska

Physical characteristics
- Source: West Walker River
  - location: Sierra Nevada, California
  - coordinates: 38°08′24″N 119°30′28″W
  - elevation: 9,640 ft (2,940 m)
- 2nd source: East Walker River
  - location: Bridgeport Valley, California
  - coordinates: 38°11′44″N 119°17′09″W
  - elevation: 6,570 ft (2,000 m)
- Source confluence
  - location: Yerington, Lyon County, Nevada
  - coordinates: 38°53′35″N 119°10′44″W
  - elevation: 4,442 ft (1,354 m)
- Mouth: Walker Lake
  - location: Mineral County, Nevada
  - coordinates: 38°48′56″N 118°44′40″W
  - elevation: 3,973 ft (1,211 m)
- Length: 62 mi (100 km)
- Basin size: 3,134 sq mi (8,120 km^{2})
- Discharge
  - location: Wabuska, NV
  - average: 164 cu ft/s (4.6 m^{3}/s)
  - minimum: 0 cu ft/s (0 m^{3}/s)
  - maximum: 3,280 cu ft/s (93 m^{3}/s)

The Walker River is a river in west-central Nevada in the United States, approximately 62 miles (100 km) long. Fed principally by snowmelt from the Sierra Nevada of California, it drains an arid portion of the Great Basin southeast of Reno and flows into the endorheic basin of Walker Lake. The river is an important source of water for irrigation in its course through Nevada; water diversions have reduced its flow such that the level of Walker Lake has fallen 160 feet (49 m) between 1882 and 2010. The river was named for explorer Joseph Reddeford Walker, a mountain man and experienced scout who is known for establishing a segment of the California Trail.

== Course ==
The Walker River is formed in southern Lyon County, 9 miles (14 km) south of Yerington, by the confluence of the East Walker and West Walker rivers. The West Walker River originates at Tower Lake in Mono County, California, 9,623 ft (2,933 m) above sea level in the Stanislaus National Forest. It flows north through a rugged canyon which provides the route for U.S. Route 395. It then emerges into Antelope Valley, where some water is diverted to the Topaz Lake reservoir, enters Nevada in Douglas County, and turns northeast. It flows through Hoye Canyon into Lyon County, then across the Smith Valley, past Smith, and finally through Wilson Canyon into the Mason Valley, where it joins the East Walker.

The East Walker River also begins in Mono County, California, in the Bridgeport Valley, fed by several Sierra streams originating in the Hoover Wilderness, including Buckeye, Robinson, Green, and Virginia creeks. After forming the Bridgeport Reservoir at the town of Bridgeport, the East Walker flows northeast into Nevada in Lyon County, receives Rough Creek, and flows north along the eastern edge of the Toiyabe National Forest before its confluence with the West Walker.

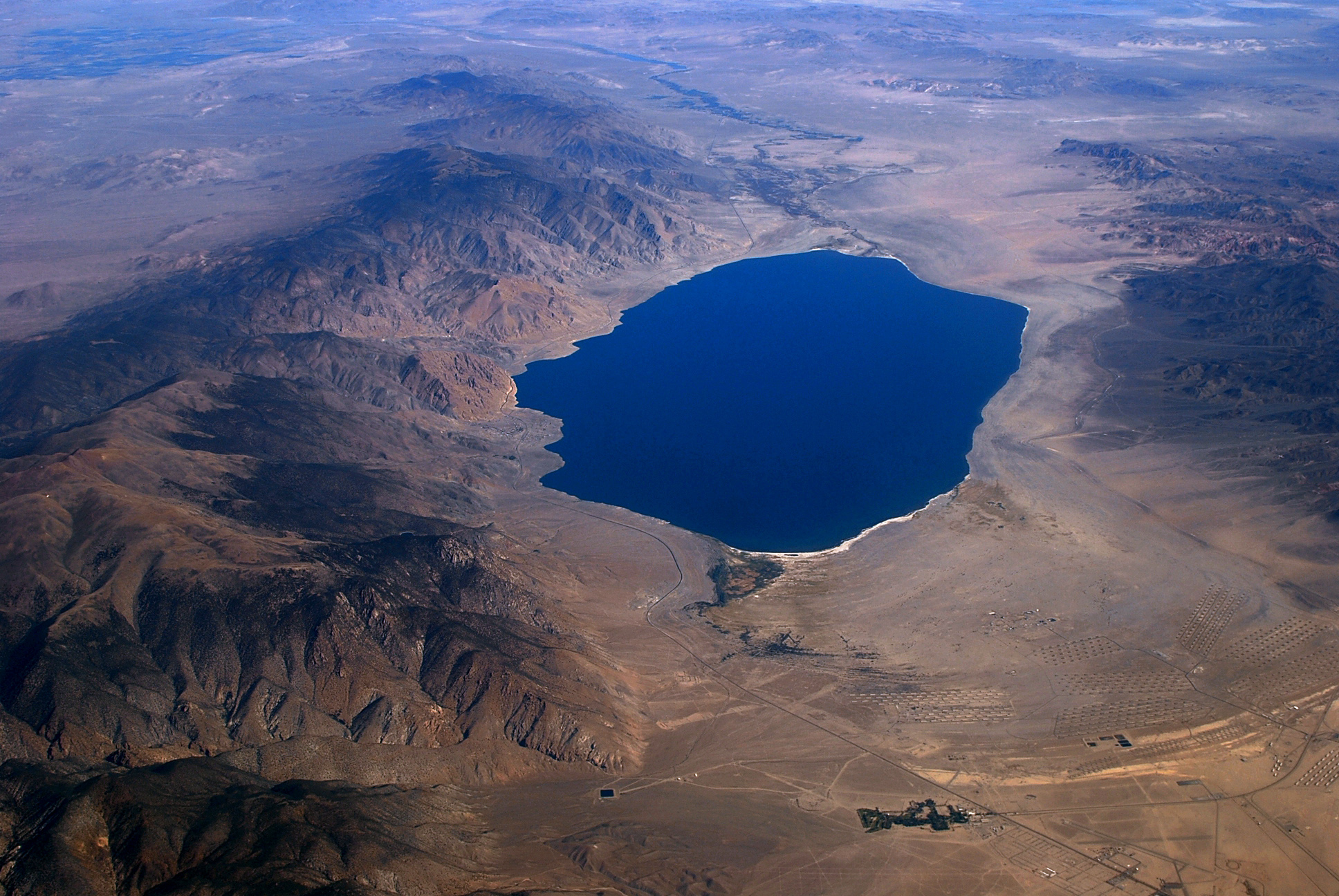
Walker Lake, the terminus of the Walker River

Below the forks, the Walker River flows initially north through the Mason Valley, past Yerington, into central Lyon County. It turns sharply to the southeast around the north end of the Wassuk Range, flowing through the Walker River Indian Reservation where it is dammed to create Weber Reservoir. It flows past Schurz, where most of the remaining water is diverted for irrigation. The river seasonally continues south to empty into Walker Lake, approximately 20 miles (32 km) north-northwest of Hawthorne.

The Walker River naturally discharged about 461 cubic feet per second (13.1 m^{3}/s) of water into Walker Lake, although this varies greatly between wet and dry years. Large irrigation diversions have reduced the average flow into Walker Lake to about 104 cubic feet per second (2.9 m^{3}/s). As a result, the level of Walker lake has dropped by 160 feet (49 m) between 1882 and 2010, with about 20 feet (6.1 m) of that occurring between 1996 and 2010. The lake has lost more than half its original surface area and 80 percent of its water volume.

== Watershed ==
The Walker River's endorheic drainage basin covers an area of 3,082 square miles (7,980 km^{2}), which is approximately 80 percent of the total Walker Lake watershed of 3,917 square miles (10,140 km^{2}). The U.S. Geological Survey divides the basin into 4 sub-basins:

- West Walker of 992 sq mi (2,570 km^{2})
- East Walker of 1,080 sq mi (2,800 km^{2})
- Walker River of 1,010 sq mi (2,600 km^{2})
- Walker Lake of 835 sq mi (2,160 km^{2})

The Walker River headwaters originate along a large section of the Sierra Crest at elevations of 12,000 feet (3,700 m) or more. The southern boundary of the Walker River drainage basin forms the northern border of Yosemite National Park. The Sweetwater Mountains lie between the West Walker and East Walker rivers, and the Pine Nut Mountains lie northwest of the West Walker. The lower Desert Mountains form the northern edge of the Walker River watershed. The Wassuk Range lies between the main Walker River watershed and Walker Lake in the east; the Walker River makes a long detour around the north end of the range in order to reach Walker Lake.

The river irrigates a total of 132,063 acres (53,444 ha), of which about 38 percent is in California and 62 percent in Nevada. Of the irrigated areas, 23 percent are in the Bridgeport Valley (California), 15 percent are in the Antelope Valley (California), 15 percent in the Smith Valley (Nevada), 44 percent in the Mason Valley (Nevada), and 2 percent on the Walker River Indian Reservation. Average annual consumptive use between 1939 and 1993 was 258,000 acre-feet (318,000,000 m^{3}), leaving only 76,000 acre-feet (94,000,000 m^{3}) to flow to Walker Lake, mostly in wet years such as 1997–98.

== Geology ==
Sedimentary evidence suggests that the Walker River has changed course in the past, flowing northwest through the Adrian Valley from a point near present-day Wabuska into the Carson River. There were some anecdotal observations of this phenomenon during the early 20th century. During these course changes, the Walker River ceased to flow into Walker Lake, causing it to dry up. Sediment deposits around Walker Lake have happened at least twice in the previous 13,000 years, although this may also have been due to severe drought.

== History ==
The first humans to inhabit the Walker River basin may have arrived as early as 11,000 years ago. At the time Europeans arrived, the area was home to the Northern Paiute people, and the Walker River Paiute Tribe lives on a reservation headquartered in Schurz.

The first European to see the Walker River was probably Hudson's Bay Company fur trapper Peter Skene Ogden, who had discovered the Humboldt River in 1828 and returned in 1829 to trap beaver south of the Humboldt Sink, although records are scant.

In 1833, Joseph R. Walker led a party sent by Captain Benjamin Bonneville to find a route from the Great Salt Lake to California via the Humboldt River, the Humboldt Sink, the Carson Sink, and then up into the Sierra Nevada by either the Carson River or the Walker River to near the headwaters of the Merced River and thence down to the San Joaquin River. John C. Frémont named Walker Lake after the trapper, and the United States Geographic Board named the river after Walker in its Fifth Report.

Due to a very heavy snowpack in the winter of 1996/1997 and a very warm spring, the West Fork of the Walker River flooded to unprecedented levels. Much of Highway 395 for the 30-mile span where it shares a canyon with the river was completely washed away.

== Ecology ==
That North American beaver (Castor canadensis) were once native to the Walker River is evidenced by a 1906 article in the Nevada State Journal newspaper by newspaper mining writer Fitz-James MacCarthy (aka Fitz-Mac), who stated that the Mason's Valley of the Walker River in Yerington was well known to "the early trappers and fur hunters...Kit Carson knew it to the bone...The beavers of course were all trapped long ago, and you never see an elk nowadays..." Beaver have since re-colonized the Walker River watershed.

The Walker River and Walker Lake formerly supported Lahontan cutthroat trout (Oncorhynchus clarkii henshawi) or LCT; however, increases in salinity due to the declining water level have decimated the fishery. The last confirmed catch of LCT from Walker Lake was in 2009. A remnant population of LCT are still extant in By-Day Creek, a tributary of the East Walker River.

The riparian zone of the lower Walker River and its delta at Walker Lake provide important habitat for migratory birds.

== In popular culture ==
=== In music ===
The popular song Darcy Farrow, written in 1964, references the Walker River and geographic features from around the associated region in Nevada:

"Where the Walker runs down to the Carson Valley Plain

There lived a maiden, Darcy Farrow was her name

The daughter of old Dundee and a fair one was she"

— Lyrics from Darcy Farrow

== See also ==
- List of Nevada rivers
- List of rivers in the Great Basin
