= Huntington Creek =

Huntington Creek may refer to several places:

- Huntington Creek (Alaska), a tributary of the Koyukuk River in central Alaska, United States
- Huntington Creek (Michigan), a tributary of the Detroit River in Detroit, Michigan, United States
- Huntington Creek (Nebraska), a tributary of the Papillion Creek in McArdle, Michigan, United States
- Huntington Creek (Nevada), a tributary of the Humboldt River in southwest Elko County, Nevada, United States
- Huntington Creek (New York), a tributary of the Owego Creek in southeast Tioga County, New York, United States
- Huntington Creek (Oregon), a tributary of the Yoncalla Creek in northern Douglas County, Oregon, United States
- Huntington Creek (Pennsylvania), a tributary of Fishing Creek (North Branch Susquehanna River) in Luzerne and Columbia counties in northeastern Pennsylvania, United States
- Huntington Creek (Utah), a tributary of the San Rafael River in northwestern Emery County, Utah, United States
