= Goose Creek Mountains =

Mountain range in Utah and Nevada, United States

- Location within Utah Location within Nevada

Highest point
- Elevation: 6,102 ft (1,860 m)
- Prominence: 2,004 ft (611 m)
- Coordinates: 41°37′34.712″N 114°7′28.058″W

Geography
- Country: United States
- States: Utah and Nevada
- Districts: Box Elder County and Elko County
- Topo map: USGS Death CreekReservoir

The Goose Creek Mountains are a mountain range in Box Elder County, Utah. They are also partly in Elko County, Nevada. It is the least topographically prominent of Utah's peaks with more than 609.6 m (2000 ft) of prominence. Death Creek is a stream in the Goose Creek Mountains that feeds into te Death Creek Reservoir.
