= Bridgeport Paiute Indian Colony of California =

Indian tribe in California, United States

Coordinates: 38.266336°N 119.215936°W

Official symbol of the colony

The Bridgeport Indian Colony of California (Northern Paiute: A'waggu Dükadü, lit. those who eat suckers), formerly known as the "Bridgeport Paiute Indian Colony of California", is a federally recognized tribe of Northern Paiute Indians in Mono County, California, United States.

Awani descendants are also enrolled in the Bridgeport Paiute Indian Colony.

== Reservation ==
Location of Bridgeport Indian Colony

The Bridgeport Indian Colony has a federal reservation in Mono County, close to the Nevada border, in the unincorporated community of Bridgeport, California. The reservation is 72 acres (290,000 m^{2}) large. Approximately fifty-five (55) Tribal Members live on the Colony, currently one hundred and five Tribal members (105) enrolled, and a registered population of 120 today. The reservation community consists of descendants from Miwok, Mono, Paiute, Shoshone, and the Washoe tribes. The reservation site is near the southeast corner of Bridgeport Reservoir.

== Language ==
The Bridgeport traditionally spoke the Northern Paiute language, which is part of the Western Numic branch of the Uto-Aztecan language family. Their dialect is sometimes called "Southern Nevada Northern Paiute." They used the Bridgeport writing system. There is currently a language project, held by University of California, Santa Cruz, dedicated to preserving and dedicating the Northern Paiute Language.

== Education ==
The reservation is served by the Eastern Sierra Unified School District.

== History ==
The Bridgeport Indian Colony was federally recognized on October 17, 1974.

== Today ==
The tribe is governed by a five-person Tribal Council, who currently are as follows:

- Joseph Art Sam, Tribal Chairman
- Timothy Minder, Vice-chairman
- David Rambeau, Member-at-Large (on reservation)
- Shawn Minder, Member-at-Large (off reservation)
- Joseph Lent, Secretary-Treasurer
