= Bryant Field =

Bryant Field may refer to:

- Bryant Field (airport) in Bridgeport, California
- Bryant Field (stadium) in Marysville, California, formerly known as Appeal-Democrat Park, All Seasons RV Stadium, and Colusa Casino Stadium
