= Buffalo Valley =

Buffalo Valley may refer to:

- Buffalo Valley (Nevada), a valley in Nevada
- Buffalo Valley, Tennessee, an unincorporated community
