= Walker Lake State Recreation Area =

Recreation area in Nevada, United States

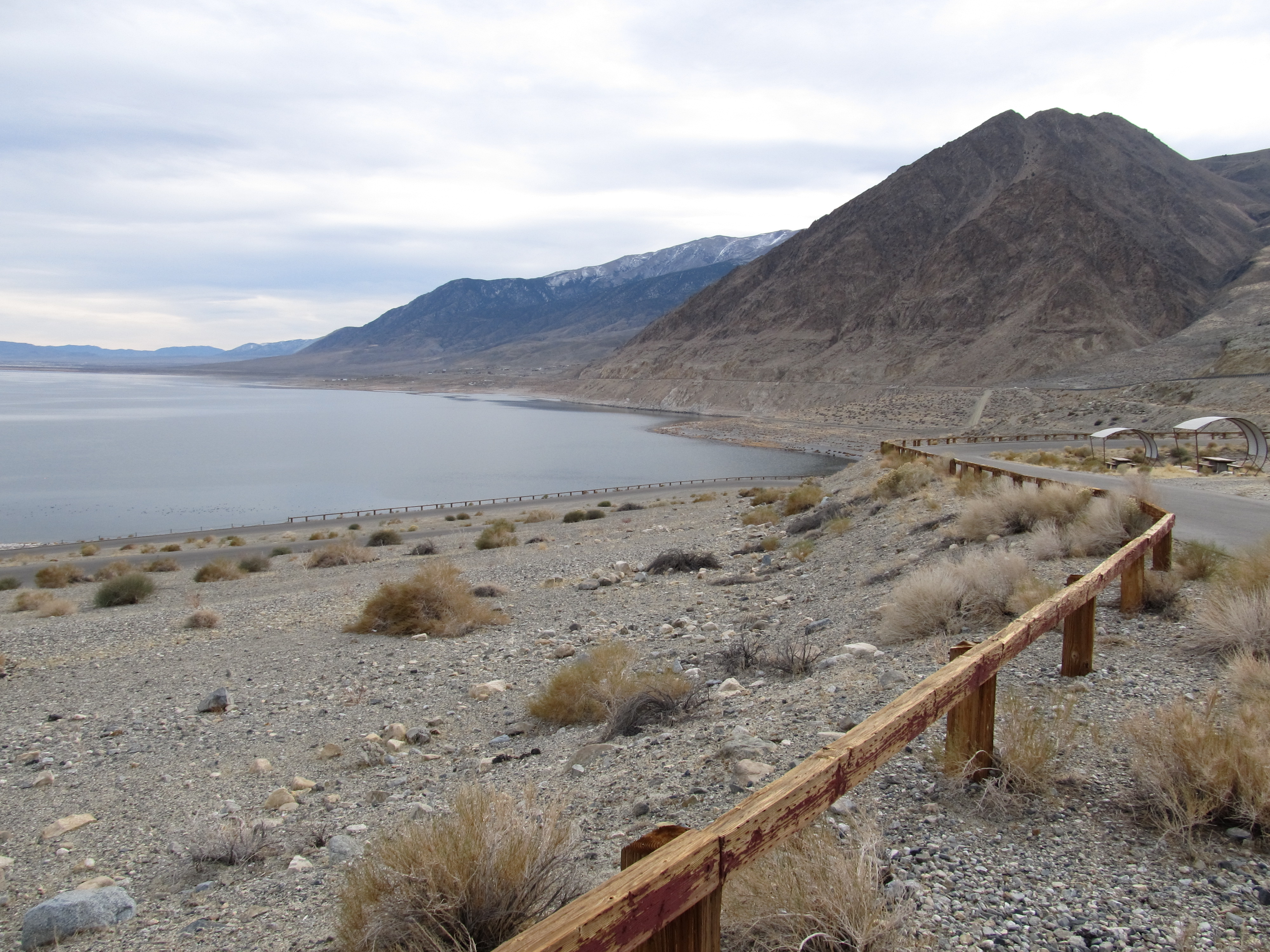
- Walker Lake Recreation Area, November 2011

- Location within Nevada
- Location: Mineral, Nevada, United States
- Coordinates: 38°41′35″N 118°46′11″W
- Elevation: 4,193 ft (1,278 m)
- Named for: Walker Lake
- Governing body: Nevada Division of State Parks

Walker Lake State Recreation Area was a recreation area of Nevada, United States, located on the south west shore of Walker Lake. The area was previously protected as a Nevada State Park featuring a boat launch and picnic tables. Currently, the Bureau of Land Management manages three campgrounds along the western shore as the Walker Lake Recreation Area. It is situated is within the Great Basin, and located north of the town of Hawthorne, on U.S. Route 95 in Nevada.
