= Newfoundland Evaporation Basin =

Watershed in Utah, United States

Coordinates: 41°05′00″N 113°35′25″W

The Newfoundland Evaporation Basin is a dry Great Basin watershed located in Box Elder and Tooele counties in Utah, United States. It was created in June 1986 by the State of Utah to harbor excess water from the Great Salt Lake. A pumping station at Hogup Ridge, canals, nearly twenty-five miles of dikes, a thirty-seven-mile-long natural gas pipeline, and an access road were constructed. Pumping of water into the basin continued until June 1989, after 6 feet of water level decline in the Great Salt Lake.
