= Northern Paiute people =

Native American people in eastern California

Northern Paiute
Numu/Numa
- Traditional lands of the Northern Paiute

Regions with significant populations
- United States (California, Nevada, Oregon, and Idaho)

Languages
- Northern Paiute

Religion
- Traditional, Christianity

Related ethnic groups
- Bannock and Mono

The Northern Paiute people are a Numic people who have traditionally lived in the Great Basin region of the United States in what is now eastern California, western Nevada, and southeast Oregon. The Northern Paiute pre-contact lifestyle was well adapted to the harsh desert environment in which they lived. Each tribe or band occupied a specific territory, generally centered on a lake or wetland that supplied fish and waterfowl. Communal hunt drives, which often involved neighboring bands, would take rabbits and pronghorn from surrounding areas. Individuals and families appear to have moved freely among the bands.

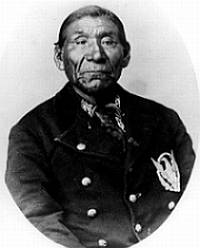
Chief Winnemucca, Chief of the Paiute. He was also named Poito.

Northern Paiute originally lived a seminomadic lifestyle, moving from place to place following animal migration patterns and seasonal foods. They lived in small, independent groups that consisted of a handful or so of different family units. Upon arrival of foreigners into western Nevada, the Northern Paiute became sedentary in order to protect themselves and handle negotiations with the new settlers. Because of their change from a nomadic to a sedentary lifestyle, women were relied upon more heavily for both their full-time employment and at-home work. In some modern Northern Paiute tribes, men work in "seasonal jobs on the ranches, in the mines, and as caretakers in the nearby motels" and women work "in the laundry, the bakery, in homes and motels as domestics, and in the country hospital".

They gathered pinyon nuts in the mountains in the fall as a critical winter food source. Women also gathered grass seeds and roots as important parts of their diet. The name of each band was derived from a characteristic food source. For example, the people at Pyramid Lake were known as the Kuyui Dükadü (meaning "cui-ui eaters", or trout eaters). The people of the Lovelock area were known as the 'Küpa Dükadü, meaning "ground-squirrel eaters" and the people of the Carson Sink were known as the Toi Dükadü meaning "tule eaters". The Kucadikadi of Mono County, California, are the "brine fly eaters".

== Relations with other tribes and European settlers ==
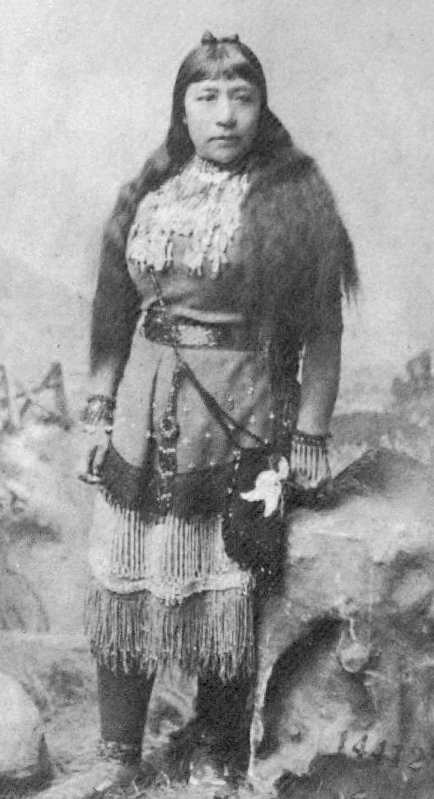
Sarah Winnemucca, Paiute writer and lecturer

Relations among the Northern Paiute and their Shoshone neighbors were generally peaceful. There is no sharp distinction between the Northern Paiute and Western Shoshone or Sosone. Relations with the Waasseoo or Washoe people, who were culturally and linguistically very different, were not so peaceful. These differences in lifestyle and language could be because Northern Paiute may have moved from southern regions to the Nevada/California area in which they currently reside. They also may have overthrown and destroyed other Indian tribes in order to inhabit their current lands. For example, the Paiute were almost "continually at war" with the Klamath south and west of them. "The Achomawi, south of the Klamath, also were enemies of the Northern Paiute, (so much so that) the earliest wars related in Achomawi oral tradition were (with) Northern Paiute".

Sustained contact between the Northern Paiute and European Americans began in the early 1840s, although the first contact may have occurred as early as the 1820s. Although the Paiute had adopted the use of horses from other Great Plains tribes, their culture was otherwise then largely unaffected by European influences. As Euro-American settlement of the area progressed, competition for scarce resources increased. Several violent confrontations took place, including the Pyramid Lake War of 1860, Owens Valley Indian War 1861–1864, Snake War 1864–1868; and the Bannock War of 1878. These incidents generally began with a disagreement between settlers and the Paiute (singly or in a group) regarding property, retaliation by one group against the other, and finally counter-retaliation by the opposite party, frequently culminating in the armed involvement of the U.S. Army. Fatalities were much higher among the Paiute due to newly introduced Eurasian infectious diseases, such as smallpox, which were endemic among the Europeans. The Natives had no acquired immunity. Sarah Winnemucca's book Life Among the Piutes (1883) gives a first-hand account of this period.

The US government first established the Malheur Reservation for the Northern Paiute in eastern Oregon. It intended to concentrate the Northern Paiute there, but its strategy did not work. Because of the distance of the reservation from the traditional areas of most of the bands, and because of its poor environmental conditions, many Northern Paiute refused to go there. Those that did, soon left. They clung to their traditional lifestyle as long as possible. When environmental degradation of their lands made that impossible, they sought jobs on White farms, ranches or in cities. They established small Indian colonies, where they were joined by many Shoshone and, in the Reno area, Washoe people.

Later, the government created larger reservations at Pyramid Lake and Duck Valley, Nevada. By that time the pattern of small de facto reservations near cities or farm districts, often with mixed Northern Paiute and Shoshone populations, had been established. Starting in the early 20th century, the federal government began granting land to these colonies. Under the Indian Reorganization Act of 1934, several individual colonies gained federal recognition as independent tribes.

== Mythology ==
Humans have inhabited the area between the West and Northwest of the United States for over 11,000 years.

One version of how the Northern Paiute people came to be is that a bird, the sagehen (also known as Centrocercus), was the only bird that survived a massive flood. The Sagehen made a fire and cared for it until the fire grew bigger and bigger. The water from the flood dried, and a man "happened." This man was called Nűműzóho, who was a cannibal. The Cannibals (as he and his kind were called) killed all the Native people, except for a woman who was able to escape. This woman kept herself alive by traveling from place to place in the region, meeting and staying with different characters. She then found a man living in the mountains whom she married. They bore four children: two Paiute (one brother, one sister) and two Pit Rivers (one brother, one sister). The two sets of children fought frequently because they were from different tribes. Their father (some think he was a Wolf) threw them in different waters. This caused them to go their separate ways while continuing to fight and quarrel whenever they came in contact with each other again. And thus the Paiute were created and their homes established in Nevada, California, and Oregon.

Another version of the creation story tells of a man and a woman who heard a voice from within a bottle. They dumped the contents of the bottle out, and four beings dropped out: two boys and two girls. The 4 people were divided by good and evil. The two good people (Paiute) were to be protected and cared for by the woman while the two bad people were subject to the man. The two sets of pairs (good and bad) left the man and woman. Each pair created fire: the two good people made a fire with minimal smoke, the two bad people made a fire with thick smoke. This made them enemies, even before foreigners plotted them against each other later on. War and strife have existed ever since.

While several other variations of these stories are told, they all share some similar events and characters. Namely Nűműzóho the Cannibal who kills almost all of the Indians but not the woman; Coyote is "the one who fixed things", mentioned briefly in many of the origin stories; a man and a woman who meet and bear four children; the four children who are paired off into different tribes and quarrel with the other pair.

The creativity in which the stories were told is part of the reason for such an array of versions. These epic stories were first told long ago to large groups gathered around a fire. The season for story-telling in the American West was during the winter months. The elderly members of the tribe would animatedly and humorously tell the tale from their memory as told to them by previous elders and family members. They were told “as a way to pass on tribal visions of the animal people and the human people, their origins and values, their spiritual and natural environment, and their culture and daily lives.”

The stories were often poems that were performed musically, called "song-poems". Members of the tribe chanted and acted out the stories to the beat of a drum with people dancing. The Northern Paiute origin story, among many other important and formative legends, was passed on orally from tribal elders to younger tribe members and from grandmothers and grandfathers to grandchildren. Many of their stories and much of their history is passed on orally even today.

== Gender roles ==
Gender roles among the Northern Paiute did not stand out in society. Men and women divided the work between each other the most traditional way: women made household tools, gathered fruit and seeds, cooked, cleaned, cared for the children, and made the clothing, while men hunted and protected their families. Men also taught their sons how to hunt and fish as a means to pass on a survival skill. Both sexes took part in storytelling, artwork and medicine, and traditional medicine. As the Northern Paiute entered the 20th century, gender roles began to shift. Men worked in seasonal jobs and the women mainly worked in laundry and medicine. The shift happened because the men that worked seasonal jobs would not have work at the end of a given season, while women had consistent work. This made women a major provider in the family. Another shift came in the shape of politics. While some women disrupted tribe meetings, Sarah Winnemucca became a figure in the eyes of the public by making claims of being a princess and using this attention to advocate for her people.

== Medicine culture and beliefs ==
Shamanism is popular among most Native American tribes, including the Northern Paiute people. A shaman is a medicine man called a puhagim by Northern Paiute people. The Northern Paiute believe in a force called puha that gives life to the physical world. It is the power that moves the elements, plants, and animals that are a part of that physical realm. Humans are seen to be very much a part of that world, not superior or inferior, simply another component. The Northern Paiute people believe that "matter and places are pregnant in form, meaning, and relations to natural and human phenomena." This belief gave credibility and placed necessity in shamans, as it does today.

In order to draw upon the powers of nature and the universe, shamans would frequently visit sacred sites. These sites can be found throughout the Great Basin and the American West. They include "mountains, caves, waterways, and unique geological formations". One such site is called the Parowan Gap and is sacred to the Paiute (see image). These sacred sites are where shamans performed many of their duties, including curing, rainmaking, warfare, fighting, or sorcery." Shamans were and are an integral part of the Northern Paiute community.

The Northern Paiute believe that doctors/shaman retrieve the souls of those who have committed wrongdoings and re-establish them in to Native American society. They are the intermediaries between the evil acts of the sick and the goodness of the healthy tribe. For this reason, Northern Paiute do not perceive White doctors as capable of fully healing those in need because although they may be able to cure the outer shell, the inner shell will decay and be lost, leaving the person dead in reality. A shaman, however, would take an ill person (physically or spiritually ill) and use the power from the universe to heal him. In many cases, a shaman will utilize various mediums, such as a rattle, smoke, and songs, to incite the power of the universe.

== Historic Northern Paiute and Mono bands ==
- Hunipuitöka or Hunipui: "Hunipui-Root-Eaters" or Walpapi (Klamath: "Mountain People"), often called Snake Indians, they lived along Deschutes River, Crooked River and John Day River in Central Oregon, with original band territory about 7,000 sq mi, and had on three sides Sahaptian-speaking peoples as neighbors – the Tinainu (Dalles Tenino) on the west, the Dock-Spus (John Day), Umatilla and Cayuse on the north, and the Nez Perce on the east, on the south were the Goyatöka (Yahuskin) and Wadadökadö Paiute bands. They are federally recognized as part of the Burns Paiute Tribe (The tribe received federal recognition in 1968.).
- Goyatöka (Klamath-Paiute: "Crayfish Eaters", from Goy’a "Crayfish" (Klamath) and Töka "Eater" (Paiute)), better known under their Klamath name as Yahuskin (Yahooskin) (either Yahu-kni – "People of far off down below" (Note: Ya (down, down below); hu (far off, in the distance, either visibly or so far as to be invisible); -kni (those of, people of), Anglicized as -kin instead of Klamath -kni. According to this etymology, ″Yahuskin″ would mean "People of far off down below", an apt name from the Klamath viewpoint.) or Y'ayn'a-kni – "Mountain People"), often called Snake Indians, also known as Upper Sprague River Snakes or even Upper Sprague River Klamath, they occupied about 5,000 square miles of Oregon High Desert along the shores of Goose, Silver, Harney, and Warner Lakes and along the Sprague River in the area now comprising Lake and Harney counties of Oregon, and hunted in the Klamath Basin, together with their close associates Hunipuitöka (Walpapi) they were counted as the most powerful and warlike of the Paiute bands in Oregon. The Klamath lived west, the Modoc south, the Hunipuitöka (Walpapi) Paiute north, the Wadadökadö and Kidütökadö Paiute bands east. They are federally recognized as part of the Klamath Tribes.
  - Dühütayohikadü: "Deer Eaters", probably a Yahuskin local group living near Silver and Summer lakes.
  - Paavituviwarai: "White Flint Dwellers", probably another Yahuskin local group living in the area of the ancient Lake Chewaucan (today encompassing the Lake Abert and Summer Lake basins).
- Wadadökadö: (Note: or Wadatika, or Waadadikady) "Wada Root and Grass-seed Eaters", (Note: They harvested the tiny black seeds of waada (Sueda depressa), a plant which grows along the shores of Harney Basin lakes.) also known as Harney Valley Paiute, they controlled about 52,500 square miles (136,000 km^{2}) along the shores of Malheur Lake, between the Cascade Range in central Oregon and the Payette Valley north of Boise, Idaho, as well as in the southern parts of the Blue Mountains in the vicinity of the headwaters of the Powder River, north of the John Day River, southward to the desert like surroundings of Steens Mountain. They are federally recognized as part of the Burns Paiute Tribe and part of the Confederated Tribes of Warm Springs.
- Tsösö'ödö tuviwarai: "Those who live in the cold" or Tsitsiadi, they lived about 2,600 square miles of desert surroundings of Steens Mountain in Oregon, Tagötöka lived to the east, the Atsakudökwa tuviwarai and Moadökadö (Agaipaninadökadö) to the south, the Kidütökadö to the west, and the Wadadökadö Paiute bands to the north. They are federally recognized as part of the Fort McDermitt Paiute and Shoshone Tribes.
- Koa'aga'itöka: "Salmon Caught in Traps Eaters", they inhabited about 7,500 square miles along Snake River to Snake River Canyon in the Snake River Plain, north lived the Nez Perce, east Northern Shoshone, south Tagötöka Paiute, west Tagötöka and Wadadökadö Paiute bands. They are federally recognized as part of the Shoshone-Bannock Tribes of the Fort Hall Indian Reservation.
- Kidütökadö, kidɨtɨkadɨ: (Note: or Gidu Ticutta or Gidi'tikadii, also glossed as "Groundhog Eaters") "Yellow-bellied marmot Eaters", also called Northern California Paiute or Surprise Valley Paiute, they lived around Goose Lake, in Surprise Valley of northern California and Warner Valley in Oregon, and in the valley along the eastern mountains of the Warner Range along the Oregon-Nevada border to the south to Long Valley and the Lower Lake, their band territory of about 5,000 square miles was bordered to the west by Achomawi, to the northwest by Goyatöka (Yahuskin), to the northeast by Wadadökadö, to the east by Tsösö'ödö tuviwarai and Moadökadö (Agaipaninadökadö), and to the south by Kamodökadö Paiute bands. They are federally recognized as the Fort Bidwell Indian Community.
- Kamodökadö: (Note: or Kamu Ticutta) "Hare-Eaters", they lived north of Pyramid Lake in the Smoke Creek and Granite Creek deserts. They are federally recognized as Yerington Paiute Tribe of the Yerington Colony and Campbell Ranch.
- Moadökadö: "Wild onion Eaters", also known as Agaipaninadökadö or Agai Panina Ticutta ("Lake-fish Eaters", literally "Summit Lake Fish Eaters" or "Trout Lake Fish Eaters"), they lived around Summit Lake (called Agaipaninadi) in Nevada and along the southern border of Idaho east of the Kidütökadö. They are federally recognized as the Summit Lake Paiute Tribe of Nevada.
- Atsakudökwa tuviwarai: (Note: also Atsakudokwa Tuviwa ga yu or Atsa-Kudok-Wa) "Those who live in the Red Mesas", they lived in the northwest of Nevada along the Oregon-Nevada border in the Santa Rosa Range, north of the Slumbering Hills, west to the Jackson Mountains, northeast to Disaster Peak and east back to the Santa Rosa Mountains, Quinn River was the most important water resource. They are federally recognized as part of the Fort McDermitt Paiute and Shoshone Tribe.
- Sawawaktödö: "Sagebrush Eaters" or Sawakudökwa tuviwarai: "Sagebrush Eaters who live in the mountains", they lived in the Winnemucca area from the Osgood Mountains and the Sonoma Mountains in the east to the Jackson Mountains in the west, from the Slumbering Hills and Santa Rosa Range in the north to Table Mountain Wilderness in the south. They are federally recognized as part of the Fort McDermitt Paiute and Shoshone Tribes and the Winnemucca Indian Colony of Nevada.
- Yamosöpö tuviwarai or Yamosopu Tuviwa ga yu: "Those who live in Crescent Valley", they lived in Paradise Valley, Nevada, which they called Crescent Valley, as well as in the Santa Rosa Range and along the Little Humboldt River, southward along the Oregon-Nevada border in the Osgoods Mountains. They are federally recognized as part of the Fort McDermitt Paiute and Shoshone Tribes.
- Makuhadökadö or Pauida tuviwarai: they lived around Battle Mountain and Unionville in Nevada, parts of the Humboldt Valley, in the desert valleys of Buena Vista Valley, Pleasant Valley, Buffalo Valley as in the Sonoma and East Mountains. They are federally recognized as Reno-Sparks Indian Colony.
- Tabussi Dükadü, Tövusidökadö: (Note: also Taboosse Dukadu, Tobusi Ticutta, or Taboose-ddukaka) "Pine nut Eaters" or "Edible seed, sedge Eaters", they lived in the mountain foothills of Nevada. They are federally recognized as Yerington Paiute Tribe of the Yerington Colony and Campbell Ranch.
- Pogai Dükadü: (Note: also Pogidukadu, Pogi Dukadu, Poo-zi Ticutta, or Padutse-ddukaka) "[Wild] Onion Eaters" or "Grass seed Eaters", they are federally recognized as the Yerington Paiute Tribe of the Yerington Colony and Campbell Ranch and Bridgeport Paiute Indian Colony of California.
- Tasiget tuviwarai: "Those who live amidst the mountains", they lived in Winnemucca Valley. They are federally recognized as part of the Pyramid Lake Indian Reservation.
- Kuyui Dükadü, Kuyuidökadö: (Note: also Kooyooe Dukadu, Kooyooe Duka'a, Cui Yui Ticutta, or Cui-ui Dicutta) "Cui-ui-Fish-Eaters", they lived along the shores of Pyramid Lake and the lower Truckee River, part of the Pyramid Lake Indian Reservation.
- Küpadökadö: (Note: or Koop Ticutta) "Ground squirrel Eaters", they lived along the shores of Lake Humboldt, their territory in the east was limited by the Shoshone people, including the Pahsupp Mountains, Kamma Mountains, and Majuba Mountains, as well as the Humboldt River. They are federally recognized as Lovelock Paiute Tribe of the Lovelock Indian Colony.
- Toi Dükadü, Toedökadö: (Note: also Toe Dukadu, Toe Tukadu, or Toi Dicutta) "Tule Eaters" or "Cattail Eaters", they lived in the Carson Sink. They are federally recognized as part of the Paiute-Shoshone Tribe of the Fallon Reservation and Colony.
- Aga'idökadö (Note: also Agai Dicutta, or Agai Ticutta) "Cutthroat trout Eaters", currently residing on the Walker River Indian Reservation.
- Kudza Düka'a, Kutsavidökadö, or Kucadikadi: (Note: also Koodzabe Duka'a) "Ephydridae (Brine fly) Larvae Eaters" or "Alkali fly pupae Eaters", also known as Piaggü Dükadü, Piagi Düka'a, or Piuga Dika "Pandora Pinemoth Larvae Eaters", also called Mono Lake Paiute. The name "Mono" derives from Monoache or Monache ("Fly larvae Eaters"), the designation used by the Yokuts for the Kucadikadi, although the Kucadikadi were Northern Paiute speakers and not Mono speakers.
- Pakwidökadö: (Note: or Pugwi Ticutta) "Chub carp Eaters", currently residing on the Walker River Indian Reservation.
- Ona Dükadü: (Note: also Onabedukadu, Onabe Dukadu, Ona Dukadu, or Ozav Dika) "Salt-Eaters" or "Alkali Eaters", also known as auch als Soda Springs Valley Paiute or Coleville Paiute, they lived in California-Nevada-region from Coleville, California in the Antelope Valley to the Monte Cristo Range and the Excelsior Mountains, today part of the Bridgeport Paiute Indian Colony of California.
- Tagötöka: (Note: or Taga Ticutta) "Lomatium dissectum Root Tuber Eaters", their originally band territory about 6,000 square miles was along the Jordan River and Owyhee River in Oregon and Idaho. Lomatium dissectum is known as "fernleaf biscuitroot" for its use in baking biscuits and as "desert parsley"; today part of the Shoshone-Paiute Tribes of the Duck Valley Reservation.
- Qui na taue Pha Numa: "People of the Big Smoky Valley", lived between the Toiyabe Range and Toquima Range in Nevada, (Note: Perhaps this was not a Northern Paiute band instead the Wiyimpihtikka (Buffalo Berry Eaters) of the Western Shoshone.) today part of the Fort McDermitt Paiute and Shoshone Tribes of the Fort McDermitt Indian Reservation.
- A'waggu Dükadü: (Note: or A'waggoo Dukadu) "Sucker Fish (Catostomus tahoensis) Eaters", they lived in the Bridgeport Valley, California, therefore also known as Bridgeport Paiute, today part of the Bridgeport Paiute Indian Colony of California.
- We Dükadü: (Note: or Way Dukadu) "Rye grass Eaters", they lived in the Bridgeport Valley, California, therefore also known as Bridgeport Paiute, today part of the Bridgeport Paiute Indian Colony of California.

== Population ==
Estimates for the pre-contact populations of most native groups in California have varied substantially. Alfred L. Kroeber thought that the 1770 population of the Northern Paiute within California was 500. He estimated their population in 1910 as 300. Others put the total Northern Paiute population in 1859 at about 6,000.

== See also ==
- Northern Paiute traditional narratives
