= Eastern Sierra Academy =

High school in California, United States

Coordinates: 37°57′40″N 119°07′17″W

Information
- Closed: 2014
- Teaching staff: 4
- Enrollment: 20

Eastern Sierra Academy (ESA) was an extremely small (twenty students and four teachers), technology-based, college-preparatory public high school serving the town of Bridgeport, California, United States. In Newsweek magazine's Challenge index ranking of America's 27,000 public high schools, ESA was ranked 19th in the nation based upon its 2004 performance. In 2003, the school was ranked 7th in the nation for its performance in 2002. The school closed in 2014 due to budgetary constraints.

== Teaching ==
Students at Eastern Sierra Academy participated in a curriculum that prepared them for post-secondary education. Parents, students, and school staff all had responsibilities and were accountable to one another in order to have maximum success for each student.

Students were required to master each subject with a "B" or better in order to receive credit for course work. If students could not maintain this average, they were asked to transfer to another high school in the district. Struggling students were given opportunities for assistance. The school had high API scores and high average SAT scores.

With a student body of twenty and four teachers, ESA sought other avenues to provide experts in each curricular field: distance learning classes via satellite and internet AP courses. ESA's three staff members teach all core curriculum including AP English Language, AP English Literature, AP Government, AP US History and AP Economics.

Students from the school gave presentations to professional organizations, received awards for their projects, and presented workshops at conferences.
