= California State Route 182 =

Highway in California

State Route 182

- Map of Mono County in eastern California with SR 182 highlighted in red

Route information
- Maintained by Caltrans
- Length: 12.645 mi (20.350 km)

Major junctions
- South end: US 395 at Bridgeport
- North end: SR 338 at Nevada state line towards Yerington, NV

Location
- Country: United States
- State: California
- Counties: Mono

Highway system
- State highways in California; Interstate; US; State; Scenic; History; Pre‑1964; Unconstructed; Deleted; Freeways
← SR 181	→ SR 183

State Route 182 (SR 182) is a state highway in the U.S. state of California in Mono County. The route connects U.S. Route 395 in Bridgeport to Nevada State Route 338 at the Nevada state line via the East Walker River valley.

== Route description ==
Route 182 is defined in section 482 of the California Streets and Highways Code, and that the highway is "from Route 395 near Bridgeport to the Nevada state line via Walker River".

SR 182 begins at an intersection with U.S. Route 395 in the small town of Bridgeport. The road then exits the town and traverses the east edge of the Bridgeport Reservoir, which is located along the East Walker River. Upon leaving the reservoir, the route enters the Toiyabe National Forest while paralleling the East Walker River. After several miles, the road finds its end at the Nevada state line. The road continues northeastward as Nevada State Route 338.

SR 182 is not part of the National Highway System, a network of highways that are considered essential to the country's economy, defense, and mobility by the Federal Highway Administration.

== Major intersections ==
Except where prefixed with a letter, postmiles were measured on the road as it was in 1964, based on the alignment that existed at the time, and do not necessarily reflect current mileage. Postmile prefixes include: R reflecting a realignment in the route since then, M indicating a second realignment, L referring to an overlap due to a correction or change, and T indicating postmiles classified as temporary. Segments that remain unconstructed or have been relinquished to local control may be omitted. The entire route is in Mono County.

Location	Postmile	Destinations	Notes
Bridgeport	0.00	US 395 – Bridgeport, Bishop, Los Angeles	South end of SR 182
	12.65	SR 338 – Yerington	Continuation into Nevada; north end of SR 182
1.000 mi = 1.609 km; 1.000 km = 0.621 mi
