= Darcy Farrow =

Song by Steve Gillette and Tom Campbell

from the album Steve Gillette
- Released: 1967
- Genre: Folk
- Length: 3:35
- Label: Vanguard
- Songwriter(s): Steve Gillette and Tom Campbell

"Darcy Farrow" is a song written by Steve Gillette and Tom Campbell, and first recorded in 1965 by Ian & Sylvia on their album, Early Morning Rain. Gillette released his first recording of it in 1967 on his eponymous album, Steve Gillette.

The song has been covered by more than 300 artists, including, most notably, John Denver, who recorded it three times and included the song in his live performances. It is included on the latest tribute album, The Music Is You: A Tribute To John Denver, released on April 2, 2013.

Other major artists who recorded "Darcy Farrow" are Chesapeake, Jimmy Dale Gilmore, Nanci Griffith, George Hamilton IV, The Kingston Trio, Tony Rice, Josh Ritter, Linda Ronstadt, The Sunshine Company, Ian Tyson (solo), and Matthews' Southern Comfort.

The song was written in 1964, inspired by something that happened to Gillette's little sister, Darcy, when she was 12. She was running behind her horse chasing it into the corral when she was kicked. She broke her cheekbone but had no lasting ill effects. Campbell took a melody that Gillette had written and came up with a story about two young lovers and a tragic fall. The place names are actual places around the region of the high valleys and the Walker River in Nevada, where Tom lived when he was eight or nine years old.

== Tracks on hit albums ==
- 1965 Ian & Sylvia, Early Morning Rain – #77 on the Billboard 200
- 1967 George Hamilton IV, Folksy – #21 on the Country Albums chart
- 1972 John Denver, Rocky Mountain High – #4 on the Billboard 200; #1 RPM 100
- 1995 John Denver, The Wildlife Concert – #104 on the Billboard 200
- 1997 John Denver, The Best of John Denver Live – #52 on the Billboard 200, #8 on the Country Albums chart
- 1997 Nanci Griffith, Other Voices Too A Trip Back To Bountiful – #85 on the Billboard 200
- 2013 Various Artists (track by Josh Ritter and Barnstar), The Music Is You: A Tribute to John Denver – #37 on the Billboard 200
