= Walker River Indian Reservation =

Coordinates: 38°59′49″N 118°42′40″W

Walker River Paiute
Total population
- Enrolled members: 900

Regions with significant populations
- United States (Nevada)

Languages
- English and Northern Paiute

Religion
- Christianity

Related ethnic groups
- Pyramid Lake Paiute, Northern Paiute peoples

Walker River Indian Reservation
- Indian reservation
- Location of the Walker River Indian Reservation
- Tribe: Walker River Paiute Tribe
- Country: United States
- State: Nevada

Area
  - Total: 1,372.62 km^{2} (529.970 sq mi)
- Website: Walker River Paiute Tribe

The Walker River Indian Reservation is an Indian reservation located in central Nevada in the United States. It belongs to the Walker River Paiute Tribe, a federally recognized tribe of Northern Paiute people.

The tribe represents two Northern Paiute bands, the larger Aga'idökadö (Agai Ticutta) ("Cutthroat trout Eaters") and the smaller Pakwidökadö (Pugwi Ticutta) ("Chub carp Eaters").

The reservation is located along the Walker River between Yerington and Walker Lake (in Northern Paiute: Hagi). At the current lake level, the reservation has only a small frontage on Walker Lake. The bulk of the reservation (72.68%) is in Mineral County; with portions in Lyon County (14.37%) and Churchill County (12.95%).

The reservation's land area is 529.970 square miles (1,372.616 km^{2}). In the 2000 census, it had a resident population of 853 persons, and 746 persons in 2010. Schurz is the only town on the reservation.

Weber Reservoir, an impoundment of the Walker River, is located upstream of Schurz and provides irrigation water for farms on the reservation. Given the environmental conditions, most of the reservation is used for cattle range.

The Walker River Paiute joined with the Pyramid Lake Paiute tribe (two Northern Paiute bands: Kuyuidökadö (Cui Yui Ticutta): "Cui-ui-Fish-Eaters", and Tasiget tuviwarai: "Those who live amidst the mountains") in a 2016 civil rights suit in federal court against the state to secure polling places on their reservations. Otherwise members had to travel excessive miles to reach a polling place. Early voting for the 2016 elections at Walker River reservation started October 22, and during the first two days, turnout nearly equaled the total of all voters in the 2012 presidential election.

== Political activism ==
Native Americans in Nevada have become more politically active in presidential and other elections, as have those in other states. As part of that, they have been seeking more equitable access to polling places and treatment by county and state officials.

Led by chairman Vinton Hawley of the Pyramid Lake Paiute, the Walker River Paiute joined in a successful civil rights suit in federal court against the state government to gain polling places on their homelands in 2016. They have had a discriminatory burden in the past by having to travel excessive distances to vote in elections. Walker River voters were enthusiastic after the victory, with early voting in the first two days on the reservation equal to the total votes cast by members of the tribe in the 2012 presidential election.

Hawley is chairman of the Inter-Tribal Council of Nevada. Many of their members have similar difficulties with access to polling places. On behalf of the council, Hawley has "urged Secretary of State Barbara Cegavske to direct counties to open [homeland] polling places for nine more tribes, including some where ballot boxes are 200-plus miles away, round trip." He also urged the Secretary of State for Nevada to improve conditions at local county polling places for urban Indians, who testified in the suit to being made uncomfortable at most offices.

== Notes ==
- Walker River Reservation, Nevada United States Census Bureau
