= Bryant Field (airport) =

- IATA: none; ICAO: KBAN; FAA LID: O57

Summary
- Airport type: Mono County
- Operator: Bridgeport, California
- Elevation AMSL: 6,472 ft (1,973 m)
- Coordinates: 38°15′45″N 119°13′33″W
- Interactive map of Bryant Field

Runways
Direction	Length		Surface
Direction	ft	m	Surface
16/34	4,239	1,292	Asphalt

Bryant Field (FAA LID: O57) is a public airport located in Bridgeport, California, USA.

The airport covers 49 acres (200,000 m^{2}) and has one runway. It is operated by Mono County.
