= Death Creek (Nevada and Utah) =

Stream in the United States

Coordinates: 38°24′10″N 110°41′35″W

Death Creek is a stream in northeastern Nevada and northwestern Utah, United States.

Death Creek was named in memory of an Indian who died near its banks.

== See also ==
- List of rivers of Nevada
- List of rivers of Utah
