= Bridgeport Valley =

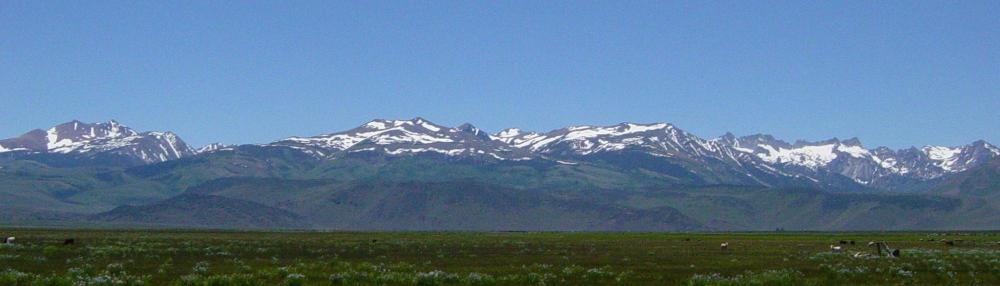
- View of the Sierra Nevada from the floor of the Bridgeport Valley
- Length: 10 mi (16 km)
- Width: 7.5 mi (12.1 km)
- Area: 45 mi^{2} (120 km^{2})
- Depth: 2,000 ft (610 m)

Geography
- Country: United States
- State: California
- Region: Mono County
- Population center: Bridgeport
- River: East Walker River

The Bridgeport Valley is a large, fertile mountain basin between the eastern Sierra Nevada and the Bodie Hills of the U.S. state of California. The valley is 10 miles (16 km) long and 7.5 miles (12.1 km) wide, and is used primarily for ranching. The East Walker River is the main stream flowing through the Bridgeport Valley; tributaries include Robinson and Swauger Creeks. The only town in the valley is Bridgeport, near Bridgeport Reservoir, which is formed by a dam that floods the northern end of the valley.

Although the surrounding terrain is predominantly steep and rugged, the floor of the valley is generally flat and lies at an elevation of some 6,460 feet (1,970 m). Vertical relief on the sheer western side can be up to 3,000 feet (910 m), while on the eastern side, the slopes are more gradual, rising 1,500 to 2,500 feet (460 to 760 m) above the valley floor. Numerous peaks exceeding 10,000 feet (3,000 m) in height border the valley within a few miles on the west, south and east sides. The highest mountain that directly borders the valley is Mount Jackson, at 9,377 feet (2,858 m) above sea level.

U.S. Route 395 bisects the valley, running from southeast to northwest. California State Route 182 also runs through the northern portion of the valley.

The north, west and southwest slopes of the valley border on the Humboldt-Toiyabe National Forest.

Bridgeport Valley is believed to be a triangular graben valley, bordered by geologic faults on almost all sides. The bedrock below the valley floor has dropped significantly below the level of the surrounding peaks, and streams flowing into it from the Sierra have deposited several hundred feet of sediments into it, creating the flat floor seen today. Thus a major portion of the valley floor actually lies on a large alluvial fan formed by Robinson Creek sediment deposits to the southwest, where the creek exits out of the mountains into the Bridgeport Valley. The channels of the alluvial fan branch out towards the north, northeast and east creating a highly fertile and well-watered grassy region. One of the valley's alternate names, "Big Meadows", likely originated from this quality.

In 1857, gold was discovered close to the Bridgeport Valley, starting the first major gold rush to the east of the Sierra Nevada in California.
