= East Walker River =

River in California and Nevada, United States

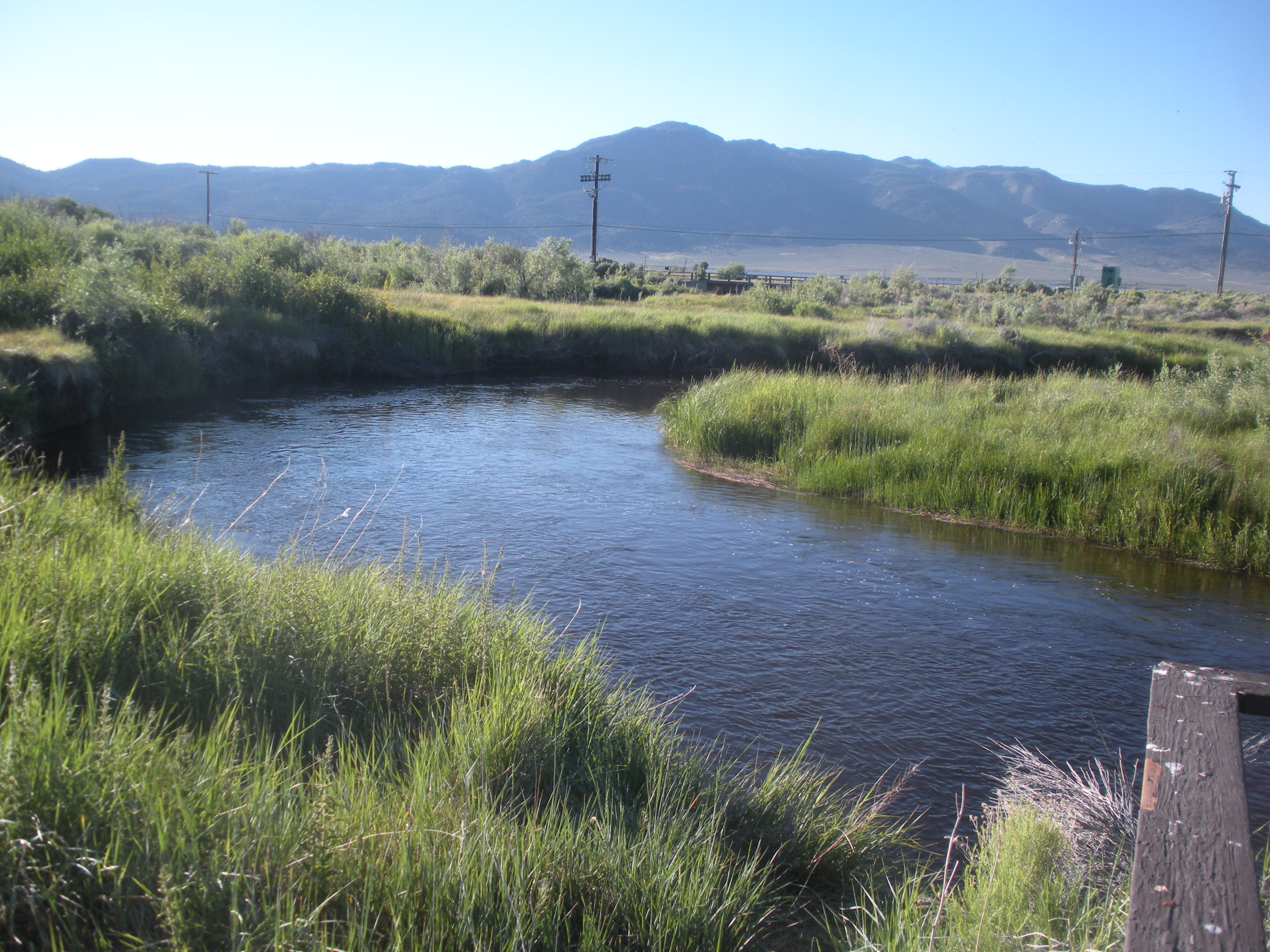
- East Walker River in Bridgeport

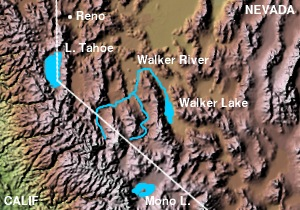
- Walker River, showing the West Walker and East Walker rivers

Location
- Country: United States
- State: California, Nevada

Physical characteristics
- Source: Sierra Nevada
  - location: California
  - coordinates: 38°11′44″N 119°17′09″W
  - elevation: 6,570 ft (2,000 m)
- Mouth: Walker River
  - location: Yerington, Nevada
  - coordinates: 38°53′34″N 119°10′46″W
  - elevation: 4,442 ft (1,354 m)
- Length: 90 mi (140 km), south-north
- Basin size: 1,230 sq mi (3,200 km^{2})
- Discharge
  - location: near Mason, Nevada
  - average: 150 cu ft/s (4.2 m^{3}/s)
  - minimum: 2.3 cu ft/s (0.065 m^{3}/s)
  - maximum: 2,820 cu ft/s (80 m^{3}/s)

The East Walker River is an approximately 90 miles (140 km) long, tributary of the Walker River, in eastern California and western Nevada in the United States. It drains part of the eastern side of the Sierra Nevada in the watershed of Walker Lake in the Great Basin.

== Watershed and course ==
The East Walker River rises from snow melt in the Sierra Nevada of eastern California north of Mono Lake and near the northeast boundary of Yosemite National Park. The mainstem begins in the south end of the Bridgeport Valley in Mono County, California, and flows from there north past Bridgeport, where it is impounded to form the Bridgeport Reservoir. Perennial tributaries of the river above Bridgeport Reservoir begin with Green Creek (and its Summers Creek sub-tributary), then Virginia Creek (and its Dog Creek, Dunderberg Creek, and Clearwater Creek sub-tributaries). Next, Robinson Creek and Buckeye Creek (and its Swauger Creek sub-tributary) enter the reservoir.

Below Bridgeport Reservoir, the East Walker River flows northeast through the Sweetwater Mountains, where it crosses the state line into southern Lyon County, Nevada and skirts to the south of the Pine Grove Hills before flowing north to join the West Walker River approximately 7 mi (13 km) south of Yerington to form the Walker River.

U.S. Highway 395 passes through the southern part of the East Walker River valley, connecting it via Conway Summit to the Mono Lake area and via Devil's Gate Pass to the West Walker River. California State Route 182 (also known as the Sweet Water Road) and its continuation Nevada State Route 338 head northeast along the southern East Walker River valley from their terminus on Highway 395 in Bridgeport but then diverge from the river and head northwest to the West Walker River valley.

== Ecology and wildlife ==
By-Day Creek, a tributary to Buckeye Creek, is believed to contain the last pure native Lahontan cutthroat trout (LCT) Oncorhynchus clarkii henshawi population in the Walker River basin and was never stocked with other species of fish. The population estimated from electrofishing in 1986 was about 1,000, but subsequent drought conditions probably reduced the population to about 250 in the early 1990s. Much of the upper watershed of By-Day Creek has been a refuge for LCT managed by the California Department of Fish and Wildlife since 1979, and these fish are used to restock other parts of the watershed.

== Recreation ==
The river provides continuous Class IV for kayaks and IK at high water. Ranchers have placed barbed wire across the river on both the California and Nevada sides.
