= Spring Valley Creek =

Stream in the American state of Missouri

Spring Valley Creek is a stream in Oregon County in the Ozarks of southern Missouri. It is a tributary of the Eleven Point River.

The stream headwaters are at 36°32′29″N 91°16′30″W and the confluence with the Eleven Point is at 36°31′28″N 91°11′44″W.

Spring Valley Creek was so named on account of the many springs which flow into it.

== See also ==
- List of rivers of Missouri
