= Thousand Springs Creek =

Stream in Box Elder County, Utah and Elko County, Nevada in the United States

Coordinates: 41°22′09″N 113°56′03″W

Thousand Springs Creek is a stream in Box Elder County, Utah and Elko County, Utah in the United States. It is a tributary to Grouse Creek.

== Description ==
The stream headwaters arise in northeast Nevada on the east slope of the Snake Mountains, and it flows east through the Dake Reservoir into northwest Utah to Grouse Creek 3.2 km (2.0 mi) northwest of Lucin.

Thousand Springs Creek was named for the fact it is fed by many springs along its course.

== See also ==
- List of rivers in Nevada
- List of rivers in Utah
