= Bridgeport Reservoir =

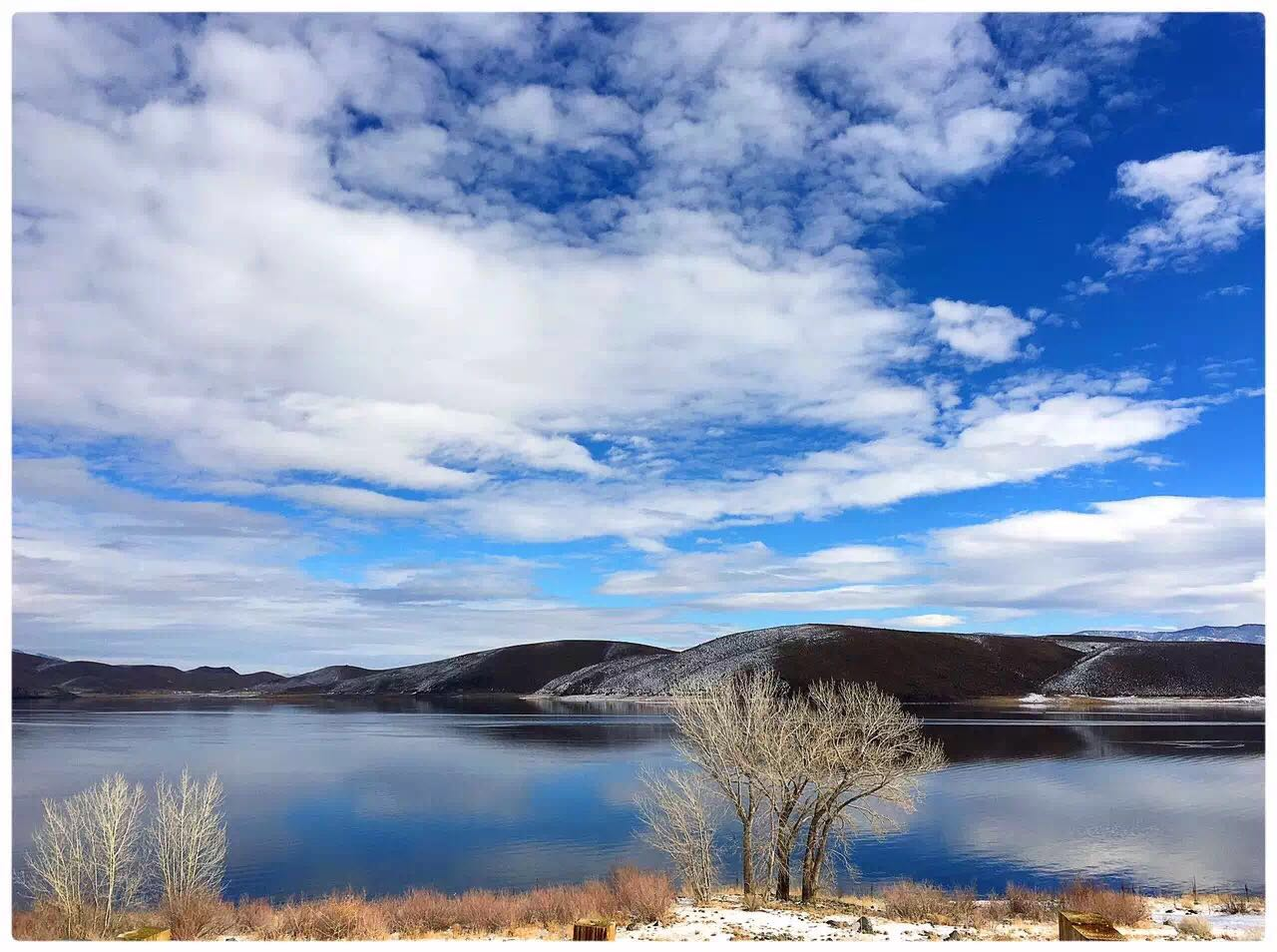
- Roadside view of Bridgeport Reservoir

- Location within California Location within the United States
- Location: Mono County, California
- Coordinates: 38°17′20″N 119°13′52″W
- Type: reservoir
- Primary inflows: East Walker River
- Primary outflows: East Walker River
- Catchment area: 356 square miles (920 km^{2})
- Basin countries: United States
- Managing agency: Walker River Irrigation District
- Built: 1924; 102 years ago
- Surface area: 3,125 acres (1,265 ha)
- Water volume: 44,100 acre-feet (54,400,000 m^{3})
- Surface elevation: 6,460 feet (1,970 m)
- Settlements: Bridgeport, California

Bridgeport Dam
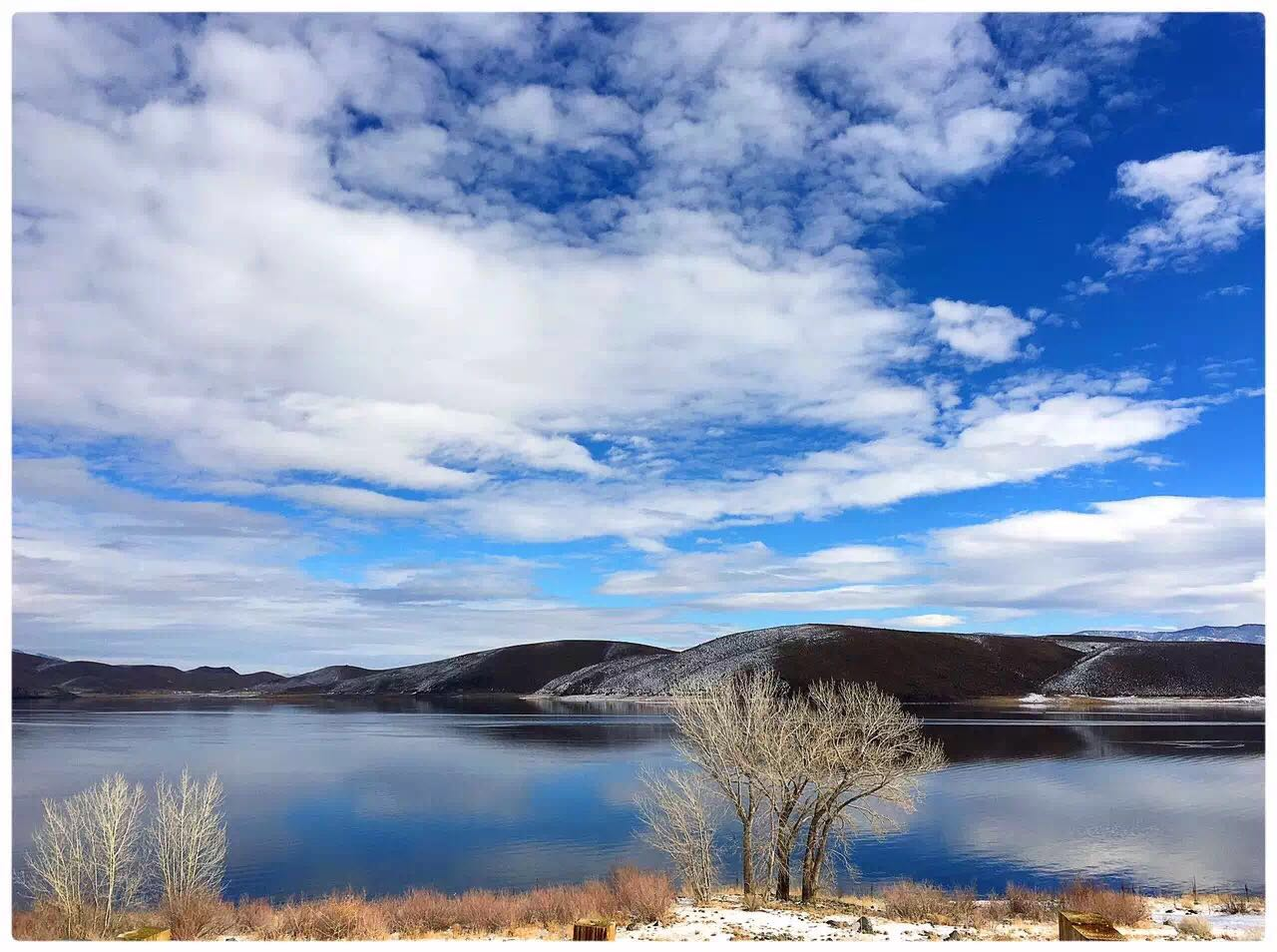

- Location within California
- Country: United States
- Location: Mono County, California
- Coordinates: 38°17′20″N 119°13′52″W
- Owner: Walker River Irrigation District

Dam and spillways
- Type of dam: Earth
- Impounds: East Walker River
- Height: 63 feet (19 m)
- Length: 900 feet (270 m)
- Elevation at crest: 6,471 feet (1,972 m)
- Width (crest): 15 feet (4.6 m)
- Dam volume: 132,000 cubic yards (101,000 m^{3})

Reservoir
- Creates: Bridgeport Reservoir
- Total capacity: 44,100 acre-feet (54,400,000 m^{3})
- Catchment area: 356 square miles (920 km^{2})
- Surface area: 3,125 acres (1,265 ha)
- Normal elevation: 6,460 feet (1,970 m)

Bridgeport Reservoir is a man-made reservoir at the lower end of Bridgeport Valley in Mono County, California. Its earth-filled dam was constructed in 1923 by the Walker River Irrigation District, along the East Walker River. The lake has a storage capacity of 42,455 acre-feet (52,367,000 m^{3}) and is supplying agricultural irrigation water for use in Nevada's Walker River Irrigation District. In some years, the reservoir has also been used to aid flood control for Lyon County, Nevada.

The community of Bridgeport, which is the seat of Mono County, and the Bryant Field airstrip, are located along the river and adjacent to the upper end of the lake.

Recreational opportunities include boating and trout fishing, and resorts with boat launch facilities are located along the lake's eastern shore. Access is provided by California State Route 182.

== See also ==
- List of dams and reservoirs in California
- List of lakes in California
