= Walker Lake (Nevada) =

Lake in Nevada, United States

- Agai Pahnunadu (Northern Paiute)
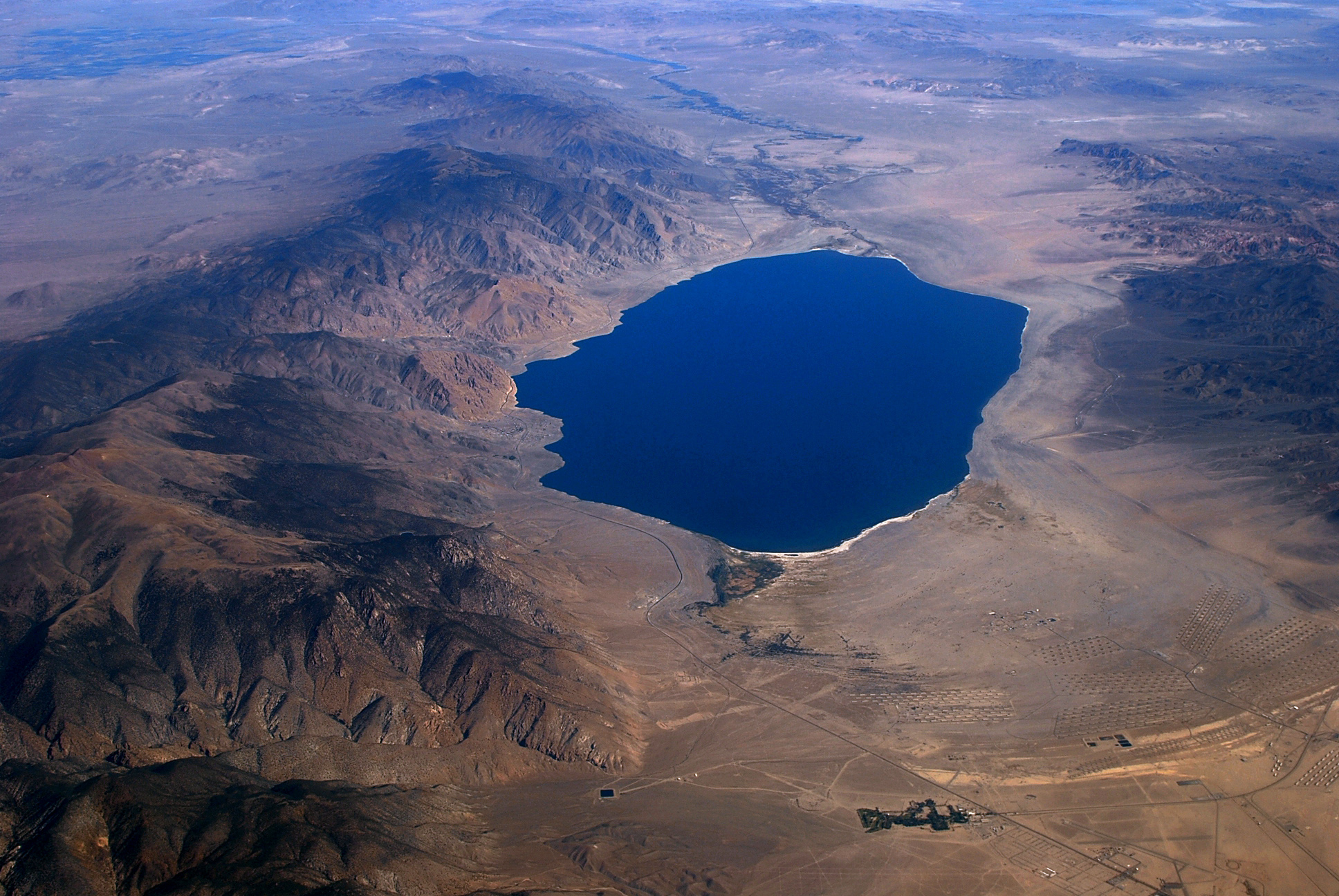
- Walker Lake with Hawthorne Army Depot in the foreground

- Location in Nevada
- Location: Mineral County, Nevada, United States
- Coordinates: 38°41′32″N 118°44′10″W
- Primary inflows: Walker River (Does not reach Walker Lake in most years)
- Primary outflows: evaporation
- Catchment area: Walker River Basin
- Basin countries: United States
- Max. length: 11 mi (18 km)
- Max. width: 5 mi (8.0 km)
- Surface area: 130 km^{2} (50 sq mi)
- Max. depth: 68 ft (21 m)
- Surface elevation: 3,960 ft (1,207 m)

Walker Lake is a natural lake in the Great Basin in western Nevada in the United States. It is 11 mi (17 km) long and 5 mi (8 km) wide, in northwestern Mineral County along the east side of the Wassuk Range, about 75 mi (120 km) southeast of Reno. The lake is fed from the north by the Walker River and has no natural outlet except absorption and evaporation. The community of Walker Lake is found along the southwest shore.

Its name in the Northern Paiute language is Agai Pahnunadu, which means "trout lake." Walker Lake and the surrounding area play a significant social and cultural role for many Northern Paiutes whose ancestors inhabited the area around the lake and depended on the lake's fish and bird populations for food.

Throughout the 20th century, Walker Lake supported over 50% of the economy of Mineral County through tourism and recreation. From fishing derbies to boat races, water skiing to an annual Loon Festival, the lake was a key part of Mineral County and Walker River Paiute communities.

More than a century of upstream irrigation diversions of the Walker River have left Walker Lake in a state of ecological collapse. As inflows have decreased and more water evaporated, the concentration of salts in the lake has increased dramatically. Walker Lake no longer supports fish life. Since the 1850s, Walker Lake has declined by 90% in terms of volume and more than 50% in terms of surface area.

Walker Lake is the focal point of significant restoration, conservation efforts, and litigation. Through the Walker Basin Restoration Program, former irrigation rights are being acquired and protected in instream for environmental benefit. The program delivered water to the lake in 2019 for the first time and aims to restore Walker lake to a state that supports fish and bird life. Mineral County and the Walker River Paiute Tribe have both brought litigation to protect Walker Lake and flows to the lower Walker River. These efforts have established the public trust doctrine in Nevada, though the lawsuit has yet to improve flows to the lake.

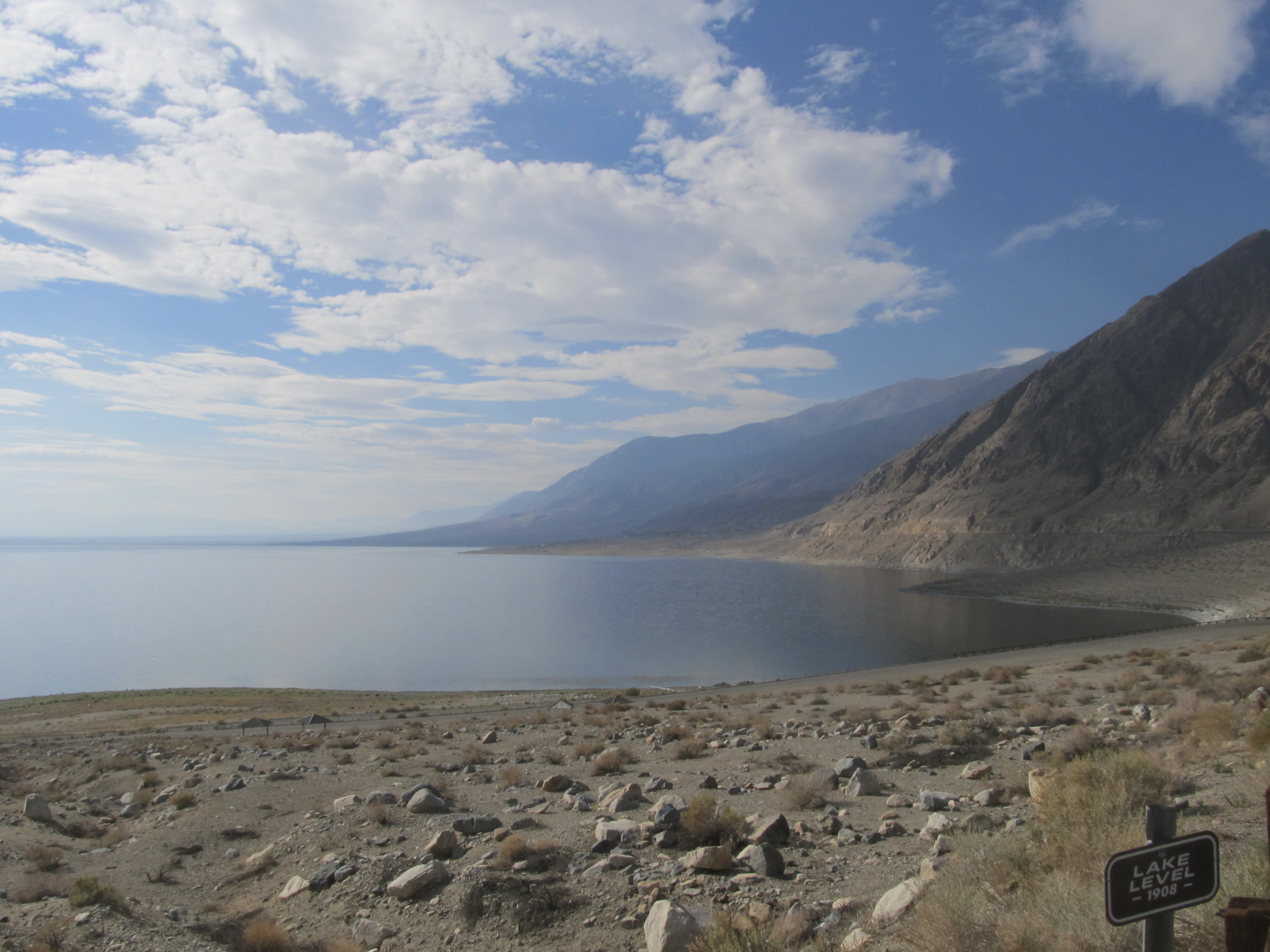
Walker Lake, Nevada, with sign in lower-right showing lake elevation in 1908.

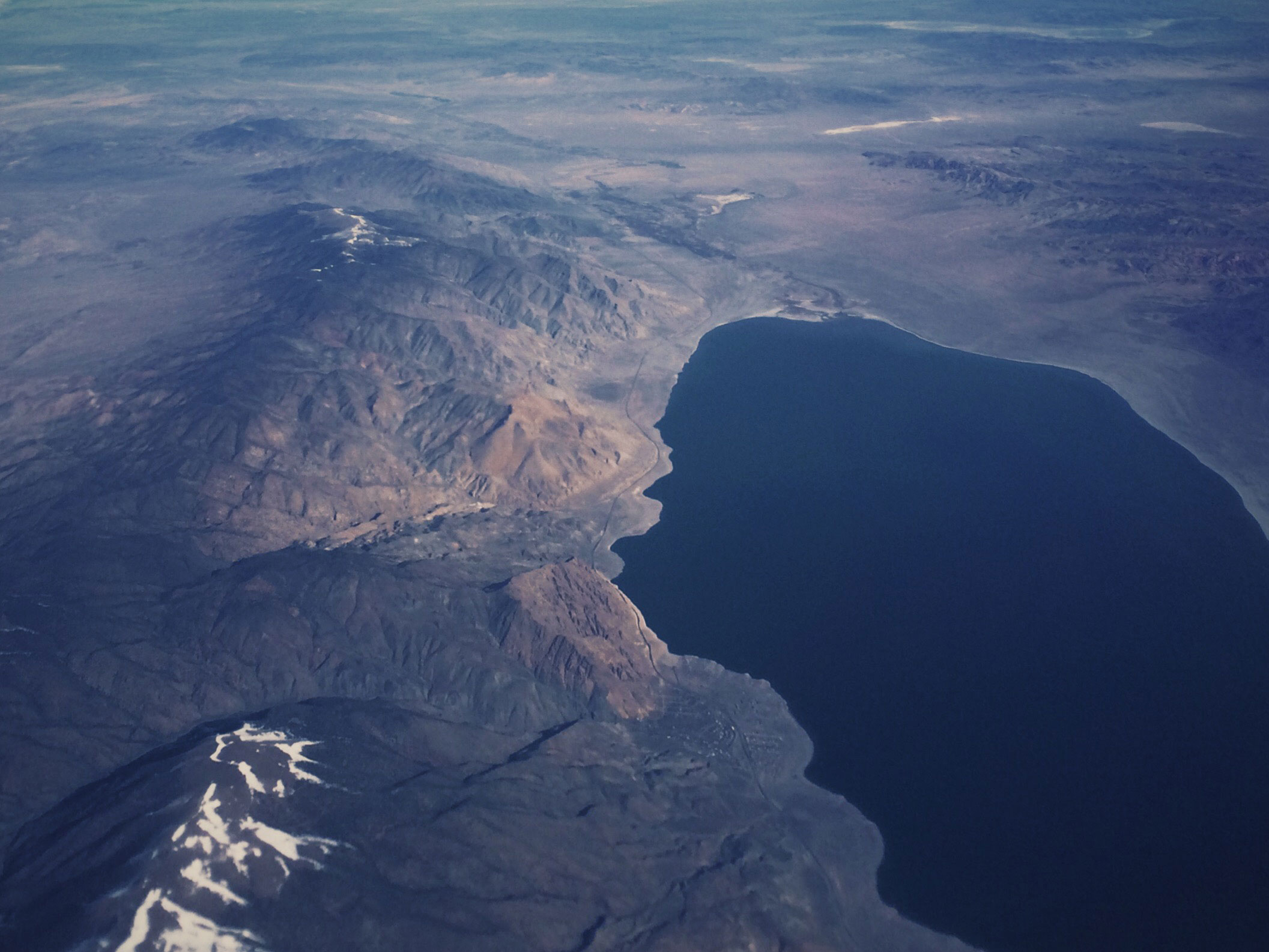
Walker Lake from the air, 2016/03/10

== History ==
The Walker River Paiute Tribe lived seasonally at the mouth of the Walker River at the time of European arrival. In Numu/Numa, their native language, the Walker River Paiute refer to themselves as Agai Dicutta, or "Trout Eaters", speaking to the cultural importance of Lahontan Cutthroat Trout to the people. Since before European colonization, the lake has been home to annual festivals celebrating the harvests of pine nuts and, historically, fish.

The original boundaries of the Walker River Reservation contained Walker Lake, though subsequent allotment to white settlers removed the lake from the reservation.

As early as 1885, the impacts of irrigation diversions on Walker Lake had been noted by the United States Geological Survey:

"Captain Simpson reports the Walker River at its mouth to be 100 yards (91 m) wide and from 6 feet (1.8 m) to 10 feet (3.0 m) deep on June 7, 1859. A measurement of the volume of the river about 3 miles (4.8 km) from its mouth, June 4, 1881, gave 400 cubic feet (11 m^{3}) per second as the rate of flow. In October of the following year, its bed was dry, and little, if any, water reached the lake from this source. This decrease during the dry season is due in a great measure to the extensive use of its waters for irrigation in Mason Valley".

These diversions have resulted in a severe drop in the lake's level. According to the USGS, the level dropped approximately 181 ft (55 m) between 1882 and 2016. By June 2016, the lake level was 3,909 feet (1,191 m) above sea level, the lowest lake elevation since measurement began in 1882. As of 2022, Walker Lake has decreased by 90% in volume and more than 50% by surface area. A lake that was once 1/2 the area of Lake Tahoe is now 1/4 the area.

The lower level of the lake has resulted in a higher concentration of total dissolved solids (TDS). As of the spring of 2016, the TDS concentration had reached 26 g/L, well above the lethal limit for most native fish species throughout much of the lake. Lahontan cutthroat trout no longer occur in the lake and recent work by researchers indicates that the lake's tui chub have disappeared. The decline of the lake's fishery is having a dramatic impact on the species of birds using the lake. By 2009, the town of Hawthorne canceled its Loon Festival because the lake, once a major stopover point for migratory loons, could no longer provide enough chub and other small fish to attract many loons.

== Conservation efforts ==
Since the 2002 establishment of the Desert Terminal Lakes Program, Walker Lake has been the focus of significant restoration, conservation, and research. In approximately the first decade of the program, more than 100 peer-reviewed academic journal articles, presentations, posters, and research projects were made possible through federal funding.

Early research-informed conservation goals suggest a TDS level of 12,000 mg/L would support native fish life and allow migratory birds to flourish. To accomplish this goal, approximately 50,000 acre-feet (62,000,000 m^{3}) of increased flows each year into Walker Lake are necessary. In 2009, legislation established the Walker Basin Restoration Program and gave the National Fish and Wildlife Foundation responsibility and authority for the program.

The Walker Basin Restoration Program restores and maintains Walker Lake while protecting the agricultural, environmental, and recreational interests of the basin. The program works with willing sellers in the Walker Basin to acquire water rights, rehabilitate former farms and ranchland, and reduce water use in the basin.

In 2012, NFWF filed its first application to protect water rights in-stream to Walker Lake. A seven-year legal battle ensued, and the first water was delivered to Walker Lake in 2019. As of 2022, the program had acquired more than 26,000 acre-feet (32,000,000 m^{3}) per year of water rights, though only approximately 25% of that water has been protected in-stream due to protracted administrative and legal processes.

The program has completed more than 20 transactions and donated land to the Mason Valley Wildlife Management Area and Nevada State Parks. In 2018, the Walker Basin Conservancy donated more than 10,000 acres (4,000 ha) and 20 miles (32 km) of the East Walker River to the State of Nevada to create the Walker River State Recreation Area.

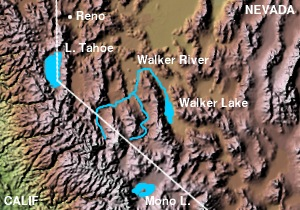
The Walker River flows into Walker Lake

The National Fish and Wildlife Foundation has been acquiring water rights to benefit the lake and has submitted applications to the Nevada State Engineer to transfer the water downstream to benefit the lake. In 2016, the Flying-M Ranch was acquired by the National Fish and Wildlife Foundation. The purchase price was $19.4 million. Along with the Pitchfork and Rafter 7 Ranches, this property comprises the new State Park.

== Litigation ==
Walker Lake is the traditional home of the Walker River Paiute Tribe. The Walker River Reservation was created in 1874 and specifically included acres to be farmed. In 1924, the United States in its trust capacity for the tribe filed suit claiming that the Tribe's reserved rights to the flows of the Walker River were being impaired by upstream diversions. The 1936 Walker River Decree adjudicated water rights in the Walker Basin in California and Nevada. The decreed rights exceed the natural flows of the Walker River in most years, and the Decree grants no rights to flows into Walker Lake.

In 1994, Mineral County intervened in ongoing litigation over the Decree to claim that flows to Walker Lake were in the public interest and to re-open the decree to grant Mineral County rights to minimum flows of 127,000 acre-feet (157,000,000 m^{3}) per year into Walker Lake. In 2013, the Nevada District Court granted the motion for a hearing. In 2018, the Ninth Circuit court certified questions to the Nevada Supreme Court, including [1] Does the public trust doctrine apply to rights already adjudicated and settled under the doctrine of prior appropriation and, if so, to what extent? and [2] If the public trust doctrine applies and allows for reallocation of rights settled under the doctrine of prior appropriation, does the abrogation of such adjudicated or vested rights constitute a “taking” under the Nevada Constitution requiring payment of just compensation?. The Nevada Supreme Court ruled that the state does have a public trust responsibility and has no statutory authority to re-balance water rights in the system. This has been construed as both a victory for environmentalists in the recognition of the public trust doctrine for Nevada's waters and a major setback to increasing the flows to Walker Lake.

== Geography ==
Walker Lake is the namesake of the Walker Lane, the geological trough in which it sits that extends from Oregon to Death Valley and beyond. It was named after Joseph R. Walker, a mountain man who scouted the area with John C. Frémont in the 1840s.

The lakebed is a remnant of prehistoric Lake Lahontan that covered much of northwestern Nevada during the ice age. Although the ancient history of Walker Lake has been extensively studied by researchers seeking to establish a climatic timeline for the region as part of the Yucca Mountain Nuclear Waste Repository study, this research has raised many puzzling questions.

== Recreation and infrastructure ==
The Walker Lake State Recreation Area, now known as Monument Beach, is located along the western shore of the lake. The Hawthorne Army Depot, the world's largest ammunition depot, fills the valley to the south of the lake. U.S. Route 95 passes along the western shore of Walker Lake.

== See also ==
- Pyramid Lake
- Mono Lake
- Owens Dry Lake
- Honey Lake
- Winnemucca Lake
- List of drying lakes
