= Marys River (Nevada) =

Stream in Elko County, Nevada, United States

Coordinates: 41°03′12″N 115°17′01″W

Marys River is a stream Elko County, Nevada, United States, that is a tributary to the Humboldt River.

Marys River was named by a pioneer citizen after his Native American wife.

== See also ==
- List of rivers in Nevada
