= Pine Creek (Humboldt River tributary) =

Stream in Nevada, USA

Coordinates: 40°36′02″N 116°11′39″W

Pine Creek is a stream in the U.S. state of Nevada. It is a tributary to the Humboldt River.

Pine Creek was so named on account of pine timber near its course.
