= Buffalo Valley (Nevada) =

Valley in Nevada, United States

Coordinates: 40°39′07″N 116°51′36″W

Buffalo Valley is a valley in the U.S. state of Nevada.

Buffalo Valley was so named on account of buffalo grass in the area. There is a giant concrete arrow, a remainder of over 1500 built in the USA during the 1920s to enable US postal service aircraft navigate more easily prior to the addition of in-craft radio.
