= Bridgeport, California =

- Census-designated place
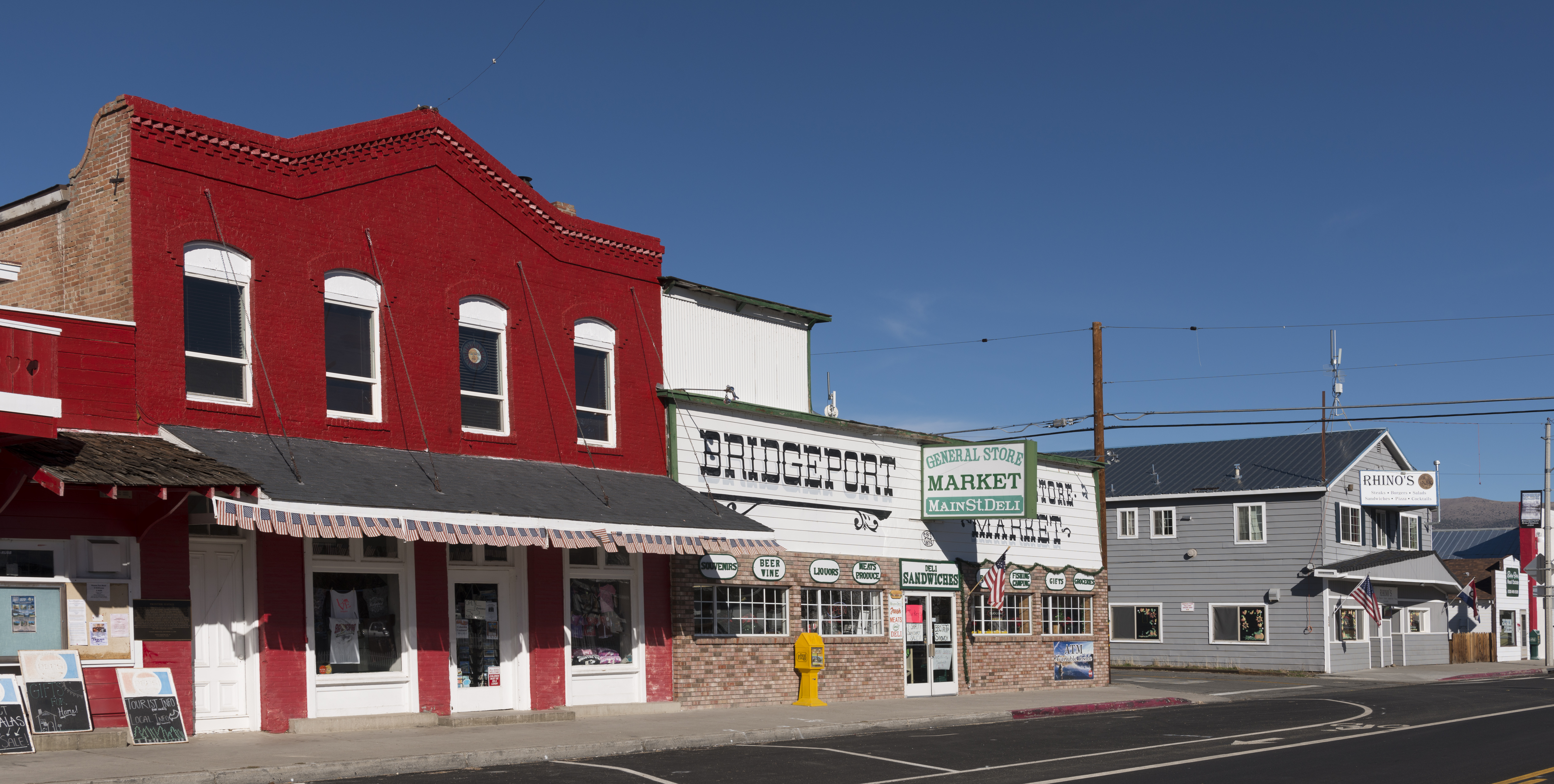
- Main Street
- Interactive map of Bridgeport, California
- Location within California Location within the United States
- Coordinates: 38°15′02″N 119°13′53″W
- Country: United States
- State: California
- County: Mono

Area
  - Total: 21.75 sq mi (56.33 km^{2})
  - Land: 21.74 sq mi (56.31 km^{2})
  - Water: 0.0077 sq mi (0.02 km^{2}) 0.04%
- Elevation: 6,598 ft (2,011 m)

Population (2020)
  - Total: 553
  - Density: 25.4/sq mi (9.8/km^{2})
- Time zone: UTC-8 (Pacific)
  - Summer (DST): UTC-7 (PDT)
- ZIP code: 93517
- Area codes: 760/442
- GNIS feature IDs: 2582950

Bridgeport is an unincorporated community and a census-designated place (CDP) in and the county seat of Mono County, California, United States. The population was 553 at the 2020 census.

The first post office at Bridgeport opened in 1864. The ZIP code is 93517, and the community is in area codes 760 and 442.

== Geography ==
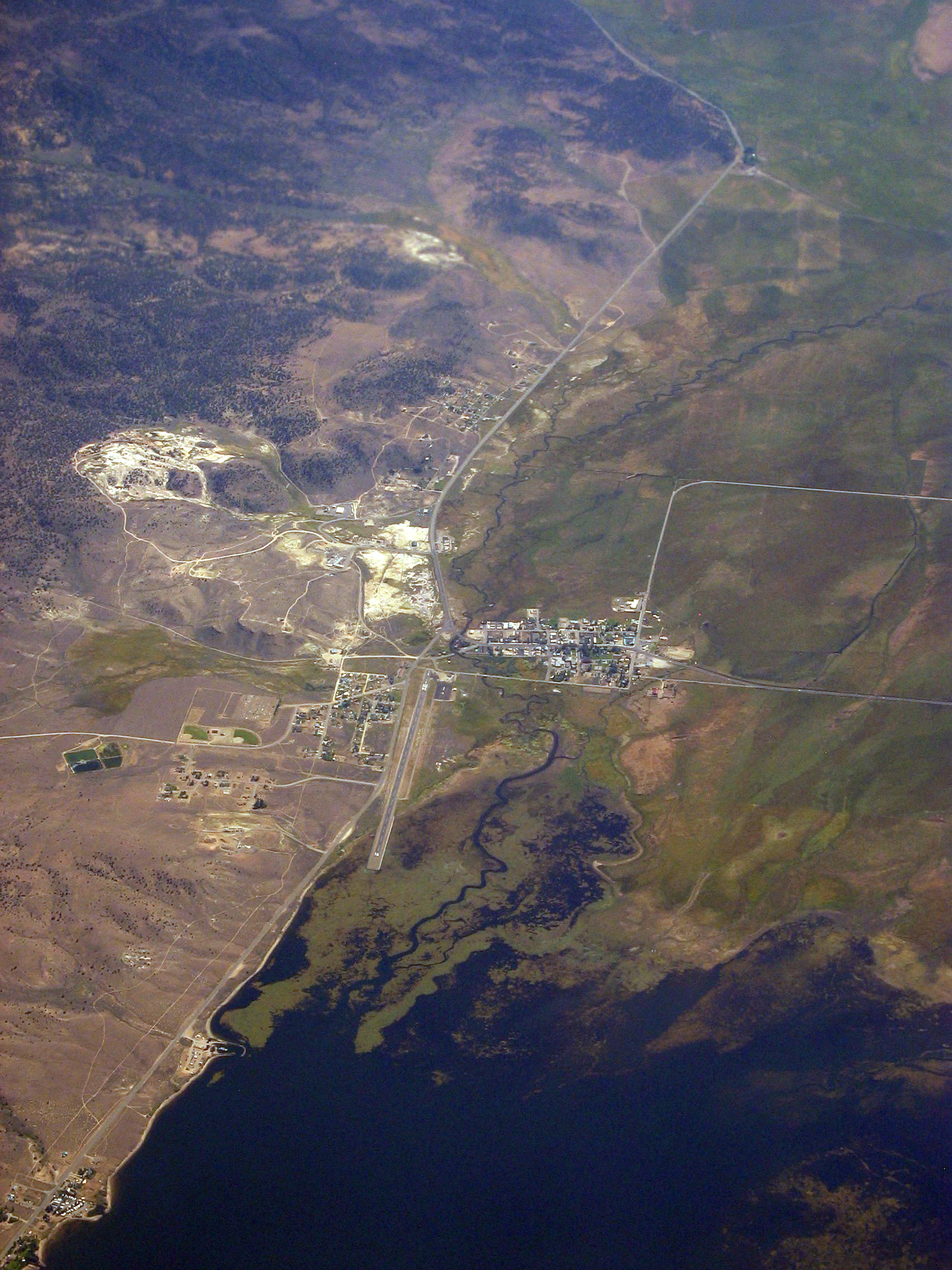
Bridgeport, Bridgeport Reservoir, and Bryant Field airport

Bridgeport is in northwestern Mono County and lies at an elevation of 6,463 feet (1,970 m) in the middle of the Bridgeport Valley. The valley is ringed by mountains with the Sierra Nevada to the west, the Sweetwater Mountains to the north, and the Bodie Hills to the east.

The town center is located at the intersection of U.S. Route 395 and State Route 182. US 395 leads south 50 miles (80 km) to Mammoth Lakes and northwest 81 miles (130 km) to Carson City, Nevada, while State Route 182 leads northeast 13 miles (21 km) to the Nevada border.

According to the United States Census Bureau, the CDP covers an area of 21.7 sq mi (56.3 km^{2}), 99.96% of it land, and 0.04% of it water. Bridgeport Reservoir, an impoundment on the East Walker River, forms the northwestern edge of the community. The U.S. Marine Corps' Mountain Warfare Training Center is located approximately 20 miles (32 km) west of Bridgeport on State Route 108.

== Demographics ==
Historical population
Census	Pop.	Note	%±
2010	575		—
2020	553		−3.8%
U.S. Decennial Census; 2010

Bridgeport first appeared as a census designated place in the 2010 U.S. census.

=== 2020 census ===
As of the 2020 census, Bridgeport had a population of 553. The population density was 25.4 inhabitants per square mile (9.8/km^{2}). The age distribution was 98 people (17.7%) under the age of 18, 30 people (5.4%) aged 18 to 24, 147 people (26.6%) aged 25 to 44, 166 people (30.0%) aged 45 to 64, and 112 people (20.3%) who were 65 years of age or older. The median age was 45.2 years. For every 100 females there were 116.9 males, and for every 100 females age 18 and over there were 113.6 males age 18 and over.

0.0% of residents lived in urban areas, while 100.0% lived in rural areas. The census reported that 534 people (96.6% of the population) lived in households and 19 (3.4%) were institutionalized.

There were 246 households in Bridgeport, of which 25.6% had children under the age of 18 living in them. Of all households, 42.3% were married-couple households, 7.3% were cohabiting couple households, 25.2% were households with a male householder and no spouse or partner present, and 25.2% were households with a female householder and no spouse or partner present. About 33.7% of all households were made up of individuals and 15.0% had someone living alone who was 65 years of age or older. The average household size was 2.17. There were 139 families (56.5% of all households).

There were 349 housing units at an average density of 16.1 units per square mile (6.2 units/km^{2}), of which 29.5% were vacant. The homeowner vacancy rate was 1.4% and the rental vacancy rate was 3.4%. Of the occupied units, 136 (55.3%) were owner-occupied and 110 (44.7%) were occupied by renters.

Racial composition as of the 2020 census
Race	Number	Percent
White	350	63.3%
Black or African American	4	0.7%
American Indian and Alaska Native	22	4.0%
Asian	7	1.3%
Native Hawaiian and Other Pacific Islander	1	0.2%
Some other race	55	9.9%
Two or more races	114	20.6%
Hispanic or Latino (of any race)	171	30.9%

== Tourism ==
Formerly known as Big Meadows, Bridgeport is visited by thousands of tourists every year, many of whom come to the area for its well-known trout streams and lakes. Bridgeport Reservoir, Twin Lakes, Virginia Lakes, Green Creek, the East Walker River, the West Walker River and numerous small tributaries and backcountry lakes offer rainbow, brown and cutthroat trout fishing. The Bridgeport Fish Enhancement Program sponsors fishing tournaments twice per season. Bridgeport also occasionally plays host to the annual E Clampus Vitus celebration.

Bridgeport is known for its backcountry winter recreation. Over 500 miles of cross-country skiing, snowshoeing, dogsledding, snowmobiling and multiple-use trails are found around the town, including Virginia Lakes Road, the Sweetwater Range, Buckeye, Bodie Hills and Summers Meadows. Many backcountry bowls can be used for telemarking and cross-country downhilling. Bridgeport is also notable for its proximity to the well-preserved ghost town of Bodie. The Mono County Courthouse is listed on the National Register of Historic Places.

== Climate ==
Bridgeport experiences a continental climate (Dsb) and featuring cold, relatively snowy winters and dry summers with very warm days and cold mornings.

Average January temperatures in Bridgeport are a maximum of 43.2 °F (6.2 °C) and a minimum of 10.3 °F (−12.1 °C). Average July temperatures are a maximum of 84.9 °F (29.4 °C) and a minimum of 43.4 °F (6.3 °C). There are an average of 8.4 days with highs of 90 °F (32.2 °C) or higher and 15.2 days where the high does not top freezing. With the high altitude, nights are extremely cold, with an average of 243.0 mornings with lows of 32 °F (0.0 °C) or lower and 17.7 mornings with lows under 0 °F (−17.8 °C). The record high temperature of 98 °F (36.7 °C) was on July 11, 2002. The record low temperature of −37 °F (−38.3 °C) occurred on January 31, 1937. Average annual precipitation is 10.19 inches (258.8 mm). There are an average of 40.4 days with measurable precipitation.

The wettest "rain year" was from July 1968 to June 1969, with 20.76 inches or 527.3 millimeters, and the driest from July 1959 to June 1960, with 4.37 inches or 111.0 millimeters. The most precipitation in one month was 7.93 inches (201.4 mm) during January 2017. The most precipitation in 24 hours was 2.98 inches (75.7 mm) on February 2, 1936. Average annual snowfall is 31.9 inches or 0.81 meters. The snowiest year was from July 1915 to June 1916, with 166.0 inches or 4.2 meters, including 121.0 inches or 3.1 meters in January 1916. The maximum snow depth was 51 inches or 1.3 meters on February 25, 1969.

Climate data for Bridgeport, California, 1991–2020 normals, extremes 1906–present
Month	Jan	Feb	Mar	Apr	May	Jun	Jul	Aug	Sep	Oct	Nov	Dec	Year
Record high °F (°C)	68 (20)	71 (22)	77 (25)	84 (29)	88 (31)	94 (34)	98 (37)	96 (36)	94 (34)	89 (32)	85 (29)	72 (22)	98 (37)
Mean maximum °F (°C)	56.1 (13.4)	58.3 (14.6)	65.6 (18.7)	74.3 (23.5)	79.2 (26.2)	87.1 (30.6)	92.1 (33.4)	90.2 (32.3)	85.8 (29.9)	79.3 (26.3)	70.0 (21.1)	59.8 (15.4)	92.5 (33.6)
Mean daily maximum °F (°C)	43.2 (6.2)	45.4 (7.4)	52.4 (11.3)	59.3 (15.2)	66.8 (19.3)	76.7 (24.8)	84.9 (29.4)	83.6 (28.7)	77.6 (25.3)	66.5 (19.2)	54.7 (12.6)	44.6 (7.0)	63.0 (17.2)
Daily mean °F (°C)	26.7 (−2.9)	29.2 (−1.6)	36.3 (2.4)	42.0 (5.6)	49.2 (9.6)	57.7 (14.3)	64.2 (17.9)	62.3 (16.8)	55.7 (13.2)	45.3 (7.4)	35.8 (2.1)	28.0 (−2.2)	44.4 (6.9)
Mean daily minimum °F (°C)	10.3 (−12.1)	13.0 (−10.6)	20.2 (−6.6)	24.7 (−4.1)	31.7 (−0.2)	38.6 (3.7)	43.4 (6.3)	40.9 (4.9)	33.7 (0.9)	24.1 (−4.4)	17.0 (−8.3)	11.5 (−11.4)	25.8 (−3.5)
Mean minimum °F (°C)	−10.7 (−23.7)	−6.1 (−21.2)	1.5 (−16.9)	11.6 (−11.3)	18.4 (−7.6)	26.8 (−2.9)	33.9 (1.1)	31.7 (−0.2)	23.3 (−4.8)	12.3 (−10.9)	1.3 (−17.1)	−7.3 (−21.8)	−16.7 (−27.1)
Record low °F (°C)	−37 (−38)	−29 (−34)	−26 (−32)	−2 (−19)	6 (−14)	10 (−12)	21 (−6)	19 (−7)	7 (−14)	−5 (−21)	−20 (−29)	−31 (−35)	−37 (−38)
Average precipitation inches (mm)	2.01 (51)	1.48 (38)	0.87 (22)	0.62 (16)	0.68 (17)	0.44 (11)	0.48 (12)	0.39 (9.9)	0.23 (5.8)	0.70 (18)	0.78 (20)	1.51 (38)	10.19 (258.7)
Average snowfall inches (cm)	7.4 (19)	8.2 (21)	3.9 (9.9)	2.4 (6.1)	0.8 (2.0)	0.1 (0.25)	0.0 (0.0)	0.0 (0.0)	0.0 (0.0)	0.3 (0.76)	1.5 (3.8)	7.3 (19)	31.9 (81.81)
Average precipitation days (≥ 0.01 in)	5.1	5.4	4.5	3.2	3.6	1.8	2.8	2.5	2.0	2.2	2.6	4.7	40.4
Average snowy days (≥ 0.1 in)	3.6	3.8	2.6	1.5	0.6	0.1	0.0	0.0	0.0	0.3	1.0	3.8	17.3
Source 1: NOAA
Source 2: National Weather Service

== Politics ==
=== State ===
In the California State Legislature, Bridgeport is in the 4th senatorial district, represented by Republican Marie Alvarado-Gil, and in the 8th Assembly district, represented by Republican David Tangipa.

=== Federal ===
Bridgeport is in California's 3rd congressional district, represented by Independent Kevin Kiley.

=== Native Americans ===
Bridgeport is the tribal headquarters for the Bridgeport Paiute Indian Colony of California.

== Education ==
Bridgeport is in the Eastern Sierra Unified School District, which has its main office in town. An elementary school and a high school (Eastern Sierra Academy) are located in Bridgeport. Bridgeport also has a public library.

== Appearances in popular culture ==
- Bridgeport appears in the storyline of the 1947 movie Out of the Past.
- Bridgeport appears in Jack Kerouac’s The Dharma Bums (1958).
- Bridgeport appears in the storyline of Dragnet, Season 3, Episode 24 (1969).
