= Huntington Creek (Nevada) =

River in Nevada, U.S.

- Etymology: Named by John C Fremont in 1845

Physical characteristics
- Source: Defue Spring
  - coordinates: 40.02020°N 115.73671°W
- Mouth
  - location: South Fork, Nevada, United States
  - coordinates: 40.61755°N 115.72912°W

Huntington Creek is a tributary of the Humboldt River in southwest Elko County, Nevada, United States.

== Geography ==
Huntington creek lies at an average elevation of 1,608 m in Elko County, Nevada.Huntington creek is located 10.3 miles away North from Spring Creek, 14.4 miles North from Elko, and 15 miles Northeast from Lamoille.

The creek flows toward North and empties into the Humboldt River. It springs East of the Diamond Mountains.

The district around Huntington Creek is occupied with mining. The creek is approximately 71.1 km long.

=== Names ===
Aside from Huntington Creek, Alternative names used of the tributary are Hamilton Creek, Huntindon Creek, Huntingdon Creek, Cranes Branch of South Fork, Huntington River, Smith Creek, and Smiths Creek.

=== History ===
It was named by John C Fremont in 1845 after one of his Delaware Indians.
