= Little Humboldt River =

River in Nevada, United States

Coordinates: 41.0336°N 117.6802°W

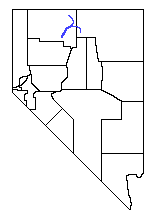
Location of the Little Humboldt River within Nevada

The Little Humboldt River is a tributary of the Humboldt River, approximately 60 miles (97 km) long, in northern Nevada in the western United States. It flows through Paradise Valley and drains into the Humboldt River northeast of Winnemucca. It is an intermittent stream draining a rugged area on the edge of the Owyhee Desert in the Great Basin.

It rises in two forks in northern Nevada. The North Fork 40 miles (64 km) rises in northeastern Humboldt County, on the northeast end of the Santa Rosa Range, and flows intermittently to the ESE along the southeast edge of the Owyhee Desert. The South Fork (40 mi/64 km) rises in extreme western Elko County north of Jake Creek Mountain and generally flows WNW. The two forks join in eastern Humboldt County 70 miles (110 km) northeast of Winnemucca, with the combined stream flowing southwest along the east side of the Santa Rosa Range to join the Humboldt approximately 5 miles (8.0 km) northeast of Winnemucca. However, the surface waters of the Little Humboldt rarely reach the Humboldt River.

It is impounded to form Chimney Reservoir near the confluence of its forks in eastern Humboldt County. The river has recently been the subject of environmental controversies regarding charges of overgrazing on the federal lands surrounding the river.
