= Special routes of U.S. Route 95 =

Special routes of U.S. Route 95

Highway system
- United States Numbered Highway System; List; Special; Divided

Several special routes of U.S. Route 95 exist. In order from south to north they are as follows.

== Existing ==
=== Las Vegas business loop ===
U.S. Route 95 Business
- Location: Las Vegas, NV
- Length: 6.7 mi (10.8 km)

U.S. Route 95 Business is cosigned with SR 599 (Rancho Drive) in Las Vegas, Nevada. This distinction is noted on US 95 freeway signs and many maps (including those published by the Nevada Department of Transportation). However, no business route signs are posted along the highway itself and relatively few SR 599 shields can be found on the route.

=== Hawthorne truck route ===
U.S. Route 95 Truck
- Location: Hawthorne, NV
- Length: 1.297 mi (2.087 km)

U.S. Route 95 Truck (US 95 Truck) is a truck route of US 95 in Mineral County, Nevada. It serves as a bypass route for trucks taking US 95 past Hawthorne in either direction, as US 95 itself goes through that community. The route is co-designated as State Route 362 (SR 362); however, that designation is unsigned.

=== Schurz–Fernley alternate route ===
U.S. Route 95 Alternate
- Location: Schurz, NV–Fernley, NV
- Length: 105 mi (169 km) 71.268 miles (114.695 km) independent of I-80
- Existed: 1941–present

U.S. Route 95 Alternate (Alternate US 95, US 95A) is an alternate route of U.S. Route 95 located in the western part of Nevada. It connects Schurz to Interstate 80 via the cities of Yerington and Fernley.

=== Payette spur ===
U.S. Highway 95 Spur
- Location: Payette, ID
- Length: 1.403 mi (2.258 km)

U.S. Route 95 Spur is a 1.403 mile spur route of U.S. Route 95 in the U.S. state of Idaho that connects travelers from US 95 to the city center of Payette.

US-95 Spur starts at its terminus with US-95 in the southern part of the city of Payette and travels northward along S. Main Street Approximately 1.1 miles (1.8 km) then continues a short distance on S 7th St to its terminus at State Highway 52.

This was the original routing of US 95 through downtown Payette before it was rerouted to its current alignment east of downtown along 16th Street.

=== Weiser spur ===
U.S. Highway 95 Spur
- Location: Weiser Junction, OR–Weiser, ID

U.S. Route 95 Spur (US 95 Spur) is a short spur route of US 95 in the states of Oregon and Idaho. The highway's western terminus is at an intersection with Oregon Route 201 (OR 201) in unincorporated Weiser Junction, Oregon. The highway's eastern terminus is in Weiser, Idaho, at an intersection with US 95. It was formed c. 1980, when it was renumbered from US 30N.

The Oregon section of US 95 Spur is designated the Weiser Spur No. 491 (see Oregon highways and routes).

The route now known as US 95 Spur was previously known as US 630 and US 30N. US 630 was an east–west United States highway. It was decommissioned in or around 1931. With a length of around 3 miles (4.8 km), it was the shortest US route ever signed. It was concurrent with US 30N for its entire length. An earlier route numbered US-630 was proposed from Echo, Utah (northeast of Coalville) to Ogden, Utah, but was never signed in the field. U.S. Route 30N was a split route off of US 30 and was coterminous with US 630 at its west end in Oregon. East of Weiser, it was concurrent with what is now US-95 to Fruitland, Idaho, where it reconnected with US-30.

== Former ==
=== San Luis truck route ===
U.S. Route 95 Truck
- Location: San Luis, AZ
- Length: 0.45 mi (720 m)
- Existed: 1984–2015

U.S. Route 95 Truck (US 95 Truck) was a 0.45-mile (0.72 km) long truck route of US 95 in San Luis, Arizona. The route was originally established by the Arizona Department of Transportation (ADOT) on November 16, 1984. US 95 Truck began at the San Luis border gate at A Street (now Urtuzuastegu Street) and traveled north on 1st Street, before turning west onto D Street, ending at the intersection with US 95 (Main Street) and D Street. In 2015, US 95 truck was retired after US 95 was reconfigured into a one-way pair around downtown San Luis. Former US 95 Truck is now entirely one-way in a northbound direction and has been replaced by northbound US 95 proper.

=== Las Vegas alternate route ===
U.S. Route 95 Alternate
- Location: Las Vegas, NV
- Length: 4.40 mi (7.08 km)
- Existed: 1953–1989

U.S. Route 95 Alternate (Alternate US 95, US 95A) was an alternate route of U.S. Route 95 in Las Vegas, Nevada that provided a bypass of the downtown area. The route was also designated as State Route 5C, a branch of State Route 5.

=== Fernley spur ===
- Location: Fernley, NV
- Existed: c. 1997–c. 2008

From approximately 1997 to around 2008, a short connector informally known as U.S. Route 95A Spur (a spur of US 95 Alternate) existed in Fernley, Nevada. It ran along Main Street from I-80 Exit 46 southward into downtown Fernley to meet US 50 Alternate / US 95 Alternate. This route appeared in Nevada's official state highway listings during that period, but was removed from the state highway log by c. 2008. Today, the corridor is designated as Interstate 80 Business and Nevada State Route 427.

=== Potlatch–Coeur d'Alene alternate route ===
U.S. Route 95 Alternate
- Location: Potlatch, ID–Coeur d'Alene, ID
- Existed: 1930s–1977

U.S. Route 95 Alternate (Alternate US 95, US 95A) was an alternate route of U.S. Route 95 in northern Idaho that traveled on the east side of Lake Coeur d'Alene. It began at Potlatch and travels east to Harvard and north through St. Maries to a junction with U.S. Route 10 near Wolf Lodge. It was replaced with various state highways, including SH-6, SH-3, and SH-97.
