= Fernley (disambiguation) =

Fernley may refer to:

== People ==
- Bob Fernley (1953–2023), British motorsport manager businessman
- David Fernley (1934–2008), South African cricketer
- Fernley H. Banbury (1881–1963), English scientist and engineer
- Fernley Marrison (1891–1967), English first-class cricketer and British Army officer
- Fernley Webber (1918–1991), British diplomat

== Places ==
- Fernley, Nevada, United States, a city
- Fernley Hills, a mountain range in Nevada
