= Nevada State Route 828 =

State highway in Nevada, United States

State Route 828
- Farm District Road
- SR 828 highlighted in red

Route information
- Maintained by NDOT
- Length: 7.736 mi (12.450 km)

Major junctions
- West end: I-80 BL / US 50 Alt. / US 95 Alt. in Fernley
- East end: Future I-11 / US 50 Alt. in Fernley

Location
- Country: United States
- State: Nevada
- County: Lyon

Highway system
- Nevada State Highway System; Interstate; US; State; Pre‑1976; Scenic
← SR 827	→ SR 829

State Route 828 (SR 828), also known as Farm District Road, is a 7.736-mile-long (12.450 km) state highway and old alignment of U.S. Route 50 Alternate (US 50 Alt.; Lincoln Highway), U.S. Route 95 and U.S. Route 95 Alternate between Fernley and Hazen.

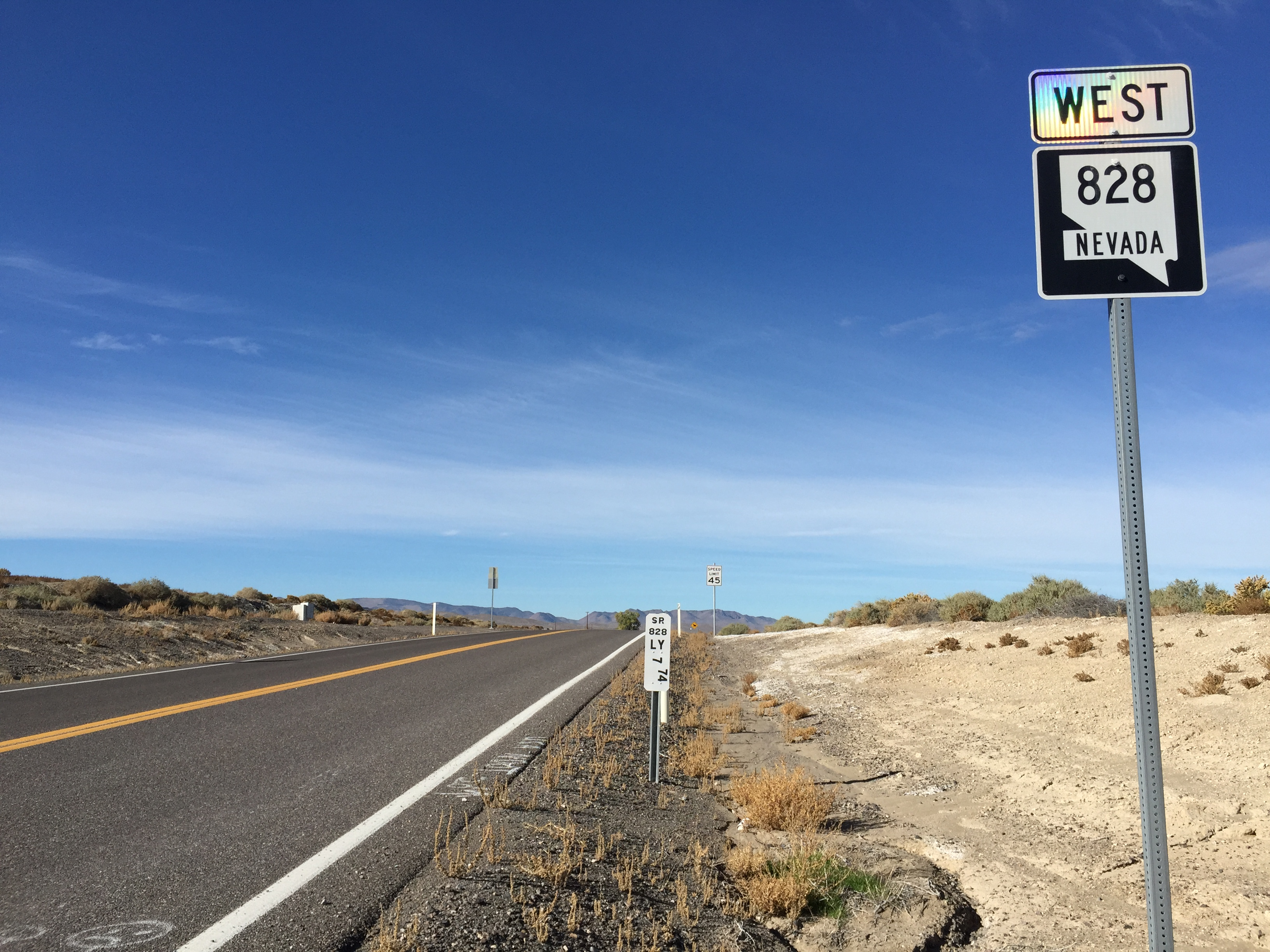
View at the eastern terminus of SR 828 looking westbound

== Major intersections ==
The entire route is in Fernley, Lyon County.

mi	km	Destinations	Notes
0.000	0.000	I-80 BL / US 50 Alt. / US 95 Alt. to I-80 – Reno, Elko, Yerington, Fallon	Roundabout; western terminus; former US 95 on US 50 Alt. east and US 95 Alt. north; former US 95 Alt. south on US 50 Alt. east
7.736	12.450	Future I-11 / US 50 Alt. – Fernley, Fallon	Proposed interchange; eastern terminus; former US 95/US 95 Alt.
1.000 mi = 1.609 km; 1.000 km = 0.621 mi
