= Hazen, Nevada =

Unincorporated community in Nevada, U.S.

- Unincorporated community
- Location within Nevada Location within the United States
- Coordinates: 39°33′55″N 119°02′47″W
- Country: United States
- State: Nevada
- County: Churchill
- Named for: William Babcock Hazen, an aide to William Tecumseh Sherman
- Elevation: 4,006 ft (1,221 m)
- GNIS feature ID: 0840934

Hazen is an unincorporated community in Churchill County, Nevada, United States. The community is approximately 12 miles (19 km) southeast of Fernley and 16 miles (26 km) northwest of Fallon, on U.S. Route 50 Alternate.

== History ==
Hazen was founded in 1903 as a station on the Southern Pacific Railroad. Some sources say the town was first settled in 1869, but it doesn't appear on maps until 1903. The community was named for William Babcock Hazen, an aide to William Tecumseh Sherman. At one time Hazen had a post office, which was established in 1904. Hazen's early economy was driven by railroad workers and canal and dam builders, who patronized the town's saloons and brothels.

Hazen is noted for the being the historic site of the last lynching in Nevada. At 2:30am on Feb. 27, 1905, around 30 men broke Red Wood, AKA Nevada Red, out of jail and hanged him from a telegraph pole 30 feet away.

The Hazen Store is listed on the National Register of Historic Places (NRHP). It "almost defies architectural description" according to the NRHP nomination form.

Vulcan Power Company started a permitting process to drill exploratory geothermal energy wells on land leases near Hazen. The project involves a bypass road across Bureau of Reclamation property.

The Hawthorne Army Depot is connected to the Union Pacific rail network by a 120-mile (190 km) single rail line beginning in Hazen.

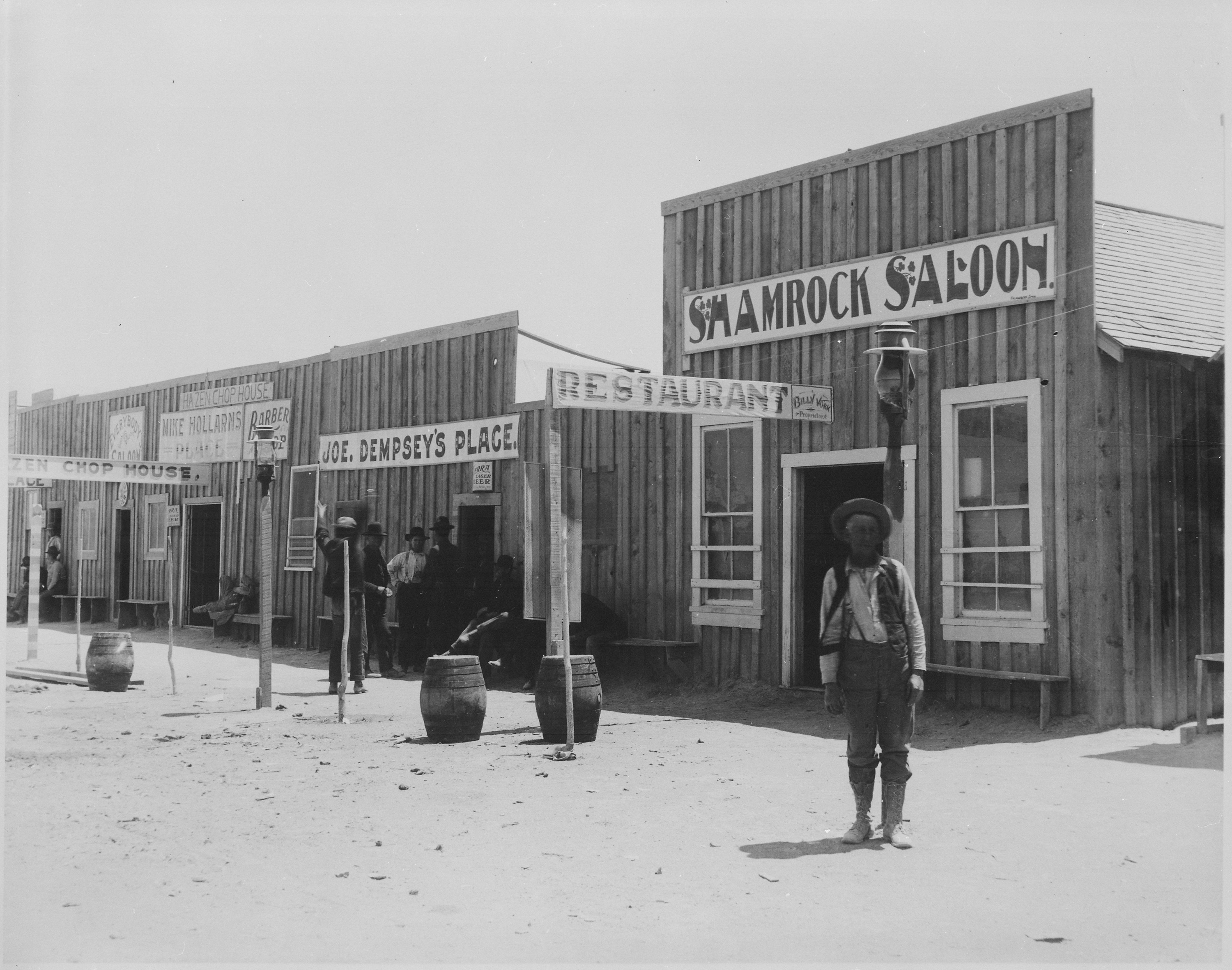
Hazen's "saloons and disreputable places" in 1905

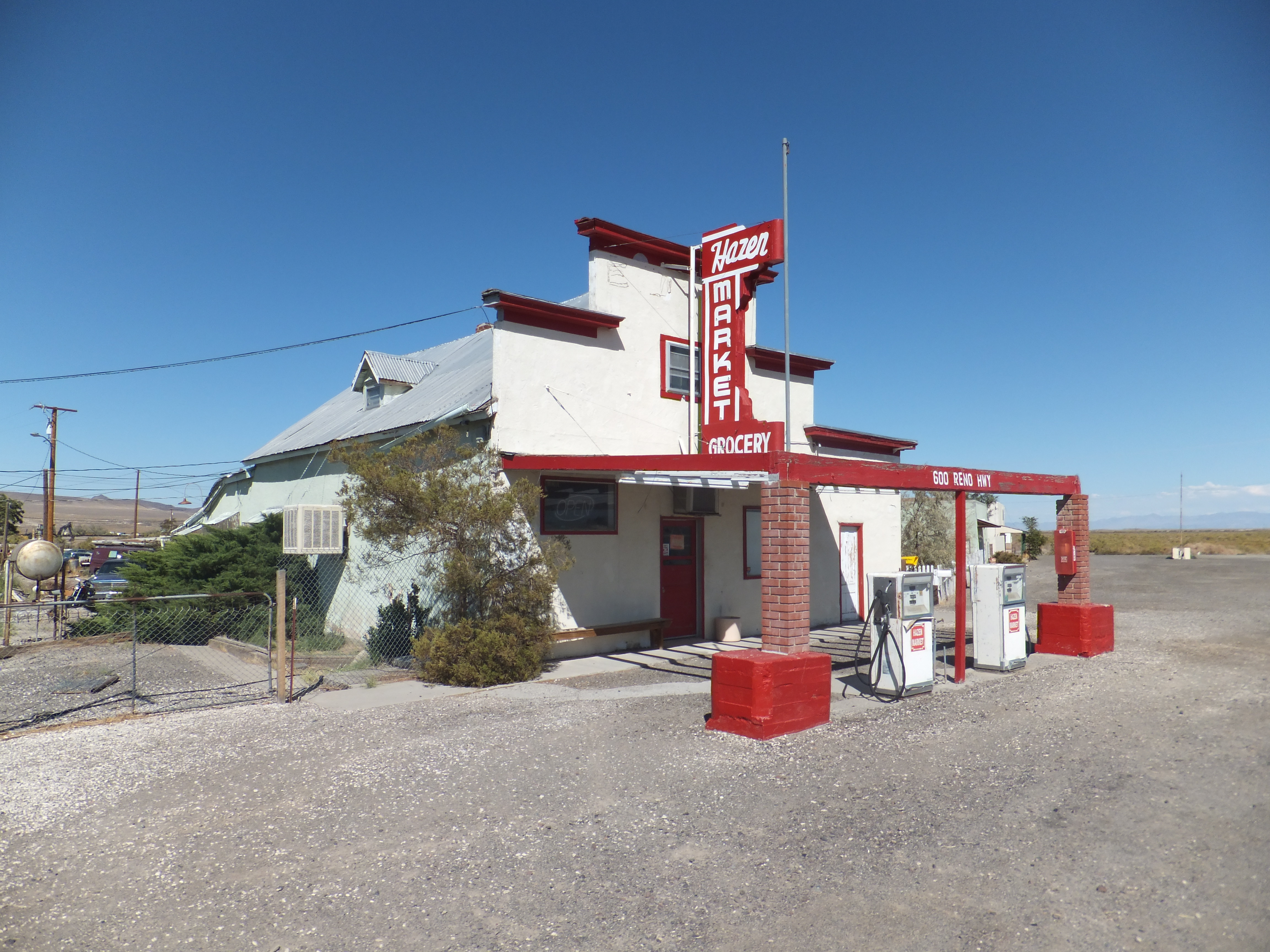
Hazen Store

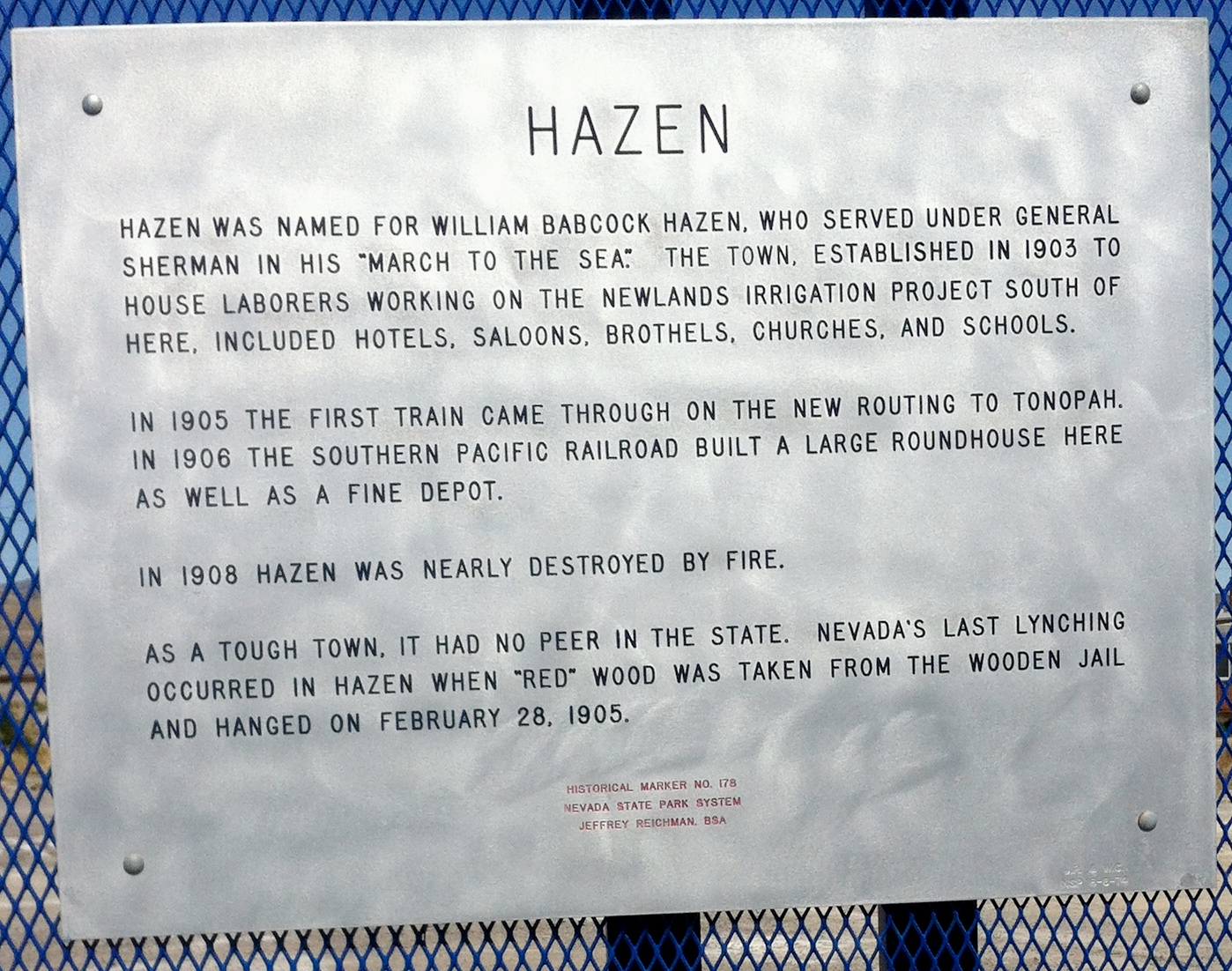
Hazen highway marker near Fallon
