= Nevada State Route 2B =

Former state highway in Nevada, United States

State Route 2B
- SR 2B highlighted in red on a modern map

Route information
- Existed: 1929–1981

Major junctions
- West end: SR 2A (now US 50) east of Dayton
- East end: SR 3 at Yerington (1929-1941) US 95 Alt. south of Silver Springs (1941-1981)

Location
- Country: United States
- State: Nevada

Highway system
- Nevada State Highway System; Interstate; US; State; Pre‑1976; Scenic

State Route 2B was one of Nevada’s original state highways, first appearing on official state highway maps around 1929. The western terminus was at its junction with SR 2A (present-day by US 50) about 6 miles (9.7 km) east of Dayton. It ran east along present-day Fort Churchill Road and then turned south along present-day Alternate US 95 to Yerington.

The section of SR 2B south of Fort Churchill Road was replaced by Alternate US 95 in 1941. Fort Churchill Road remained on state maps as a state highway until 1981 but was never paved during that time.
