= Hazen Store =

- U.S. National Register of Historic Places
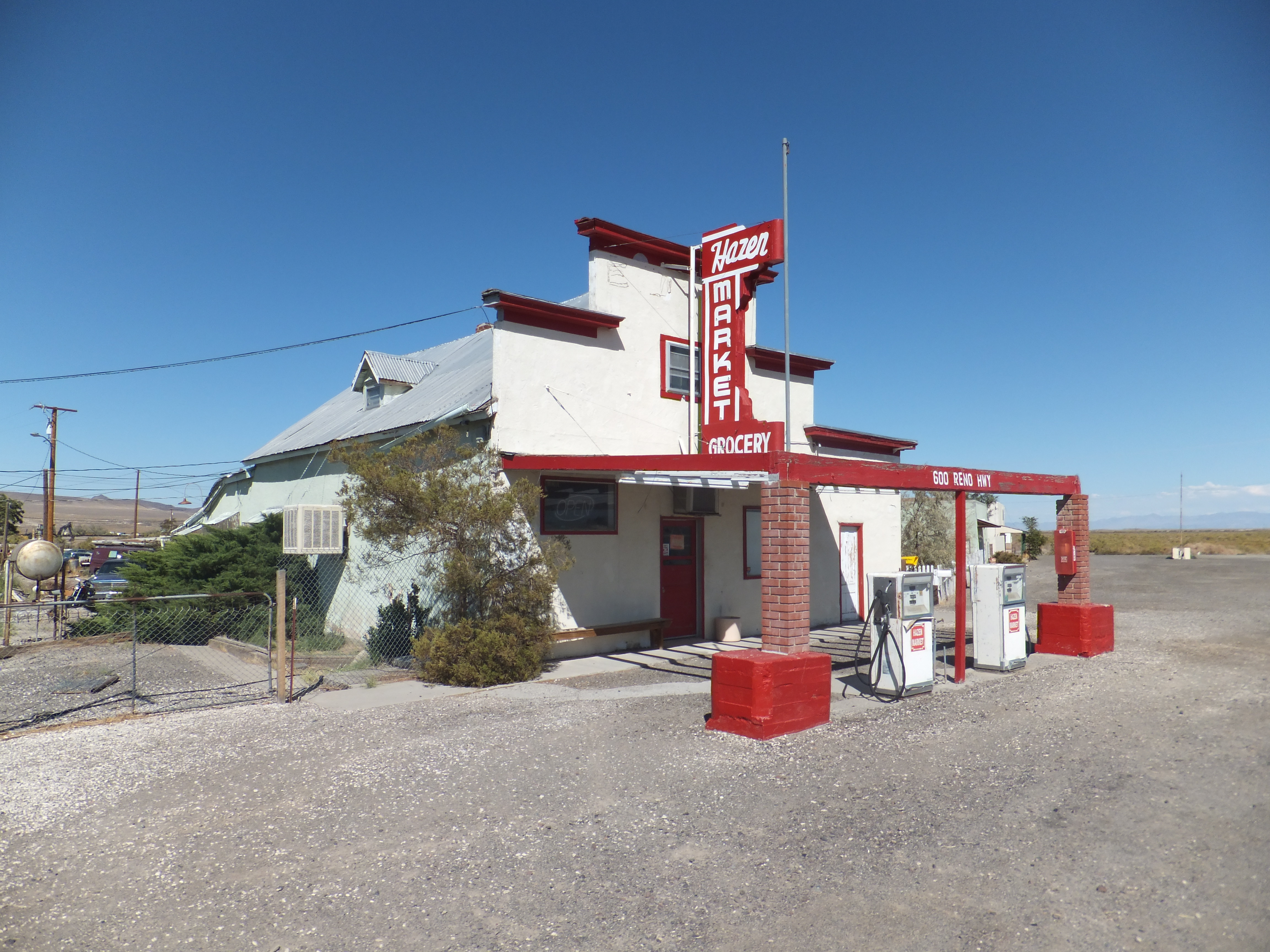

- Location within Nevada Location within the United States
- Location: 600 Reno Highway, Hazen, Nevada
- Coordinates: 39°34′0″N 119°2′35″W
- Area: 0.8 acres (0.32 ha)
- Built: 1944
- Architectural style: Utilitaran commercial
- NRHP reference No.: 01001547
- Added to NRHP: January 28, 2002

The Hazen Store is a small complex of buildings in Hazen, Nevada, listed on the National Register of Historic Places. The store provided a stopping point in a remote portion of U.S. Route 50 and served as a focal point in the small town of Hazen. The store was built in 1944 to replace an earlier store that was demolished to make way for a realignment of Route 50.

The property comprises the main store, a garage, and a bunkhouse formerly used by the Southern Pacific Railroad. The central portion of the structure dates to about 1904, operating at a different location as a saloon called Shorty's Bar until it was relocated in 1944.

The Hazen Store was listed on the National Register of Historic Places on January 28, 2002, as an illustration of a commercial property on the Reno Highway.
