= List of cities in Nevada =

Map of the United States with Nevada highlighted

Nevada is a state located in the Western United States. According to the 2020 United States Census, it is the 32nd most populous state, with 3,104,614 inhabitants, but the 7th largest by land area, spanning 109,781.18 square miles (284,332.0 km^{2}). Nevada is divided into 17 counties and contains 19 municipalities. Nevada's municipalities cover only 1% of the state's land area but are home to 56.7% of its population.

Municipalities in the state are legally described as cities, except for the state capital Carson City, which lacks legal description but is considered an independent city as it is not located in any county. To incorporate, a petition for incorporation can be made to the board of county commissioners, who consider numerous geographic, demographic, and economic factors. Cities are categorized by population for the purpose of determining the number of wards and council election structure as well as the number of city clerks: cities with 50,000 or more inhabitants are in population category one, cities with 5,000 or more but fewer than 50,000 inhabitants are in population category two, and cities having fewer than 5,000 inhabitants are in population category three. Cities are responsible for providing local services such as fire and police protection, road maintenance, water distribution, and sewer maintenance.

The largest municipality by population in Nevada is Las Vegas with 641,903 residents, and the smallest is Caliente with 990 residents. The largest municipality by land area is Boulder City, which spans 208.52 mi^{2} (540.1 km^{2}), while Lovelock is the smallest at 0.85 mi^{2} (2.2 km^{2}). The first municipality in Nevada to incorporate was Carson City, on March 1, 1875, and the most recent place was Fernley, on July 1, 2001.

== Municipalities ==
Largest cities in Nevada by population

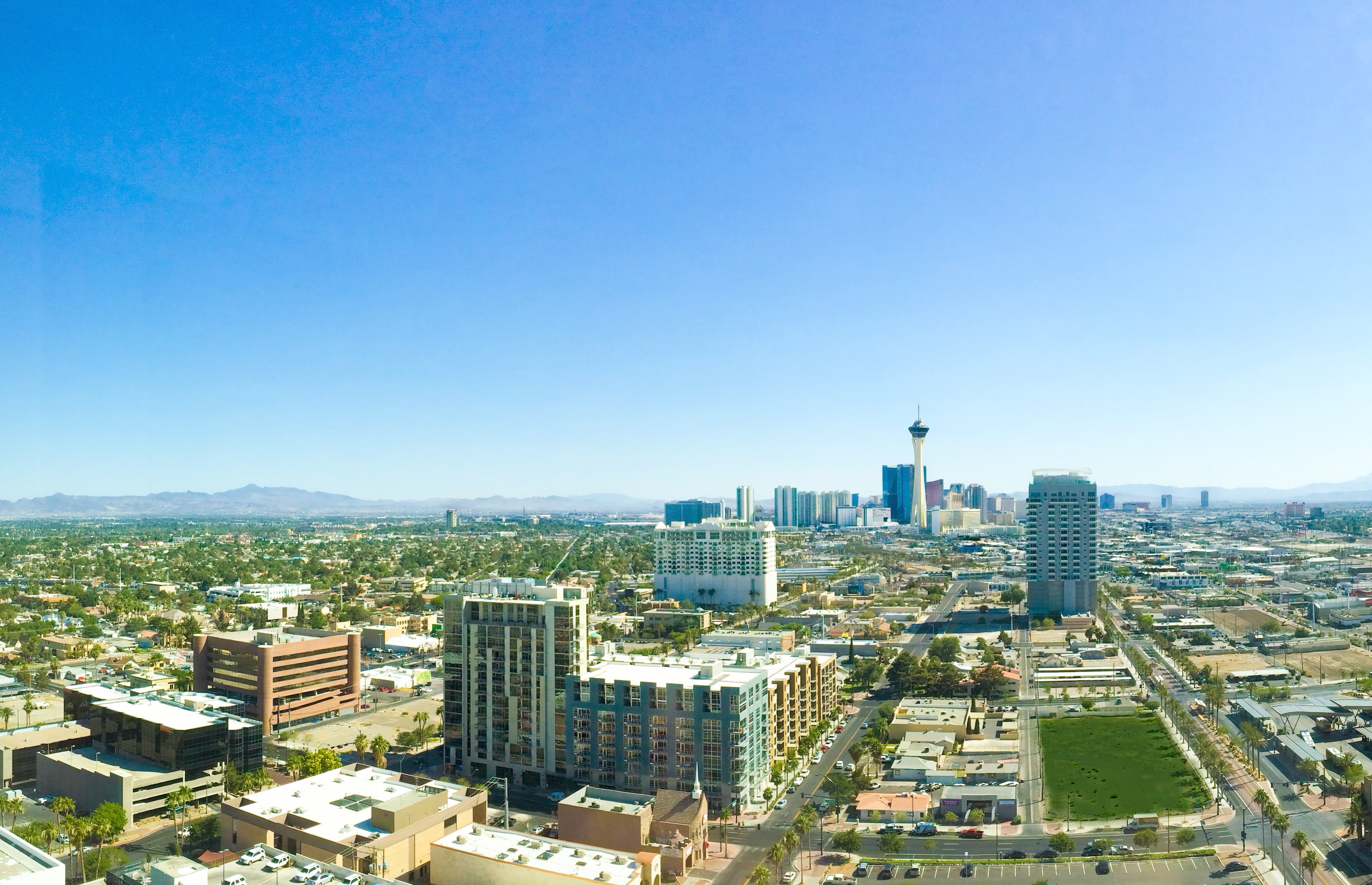
Downtown Las Vegas, Nevada's largest city by population

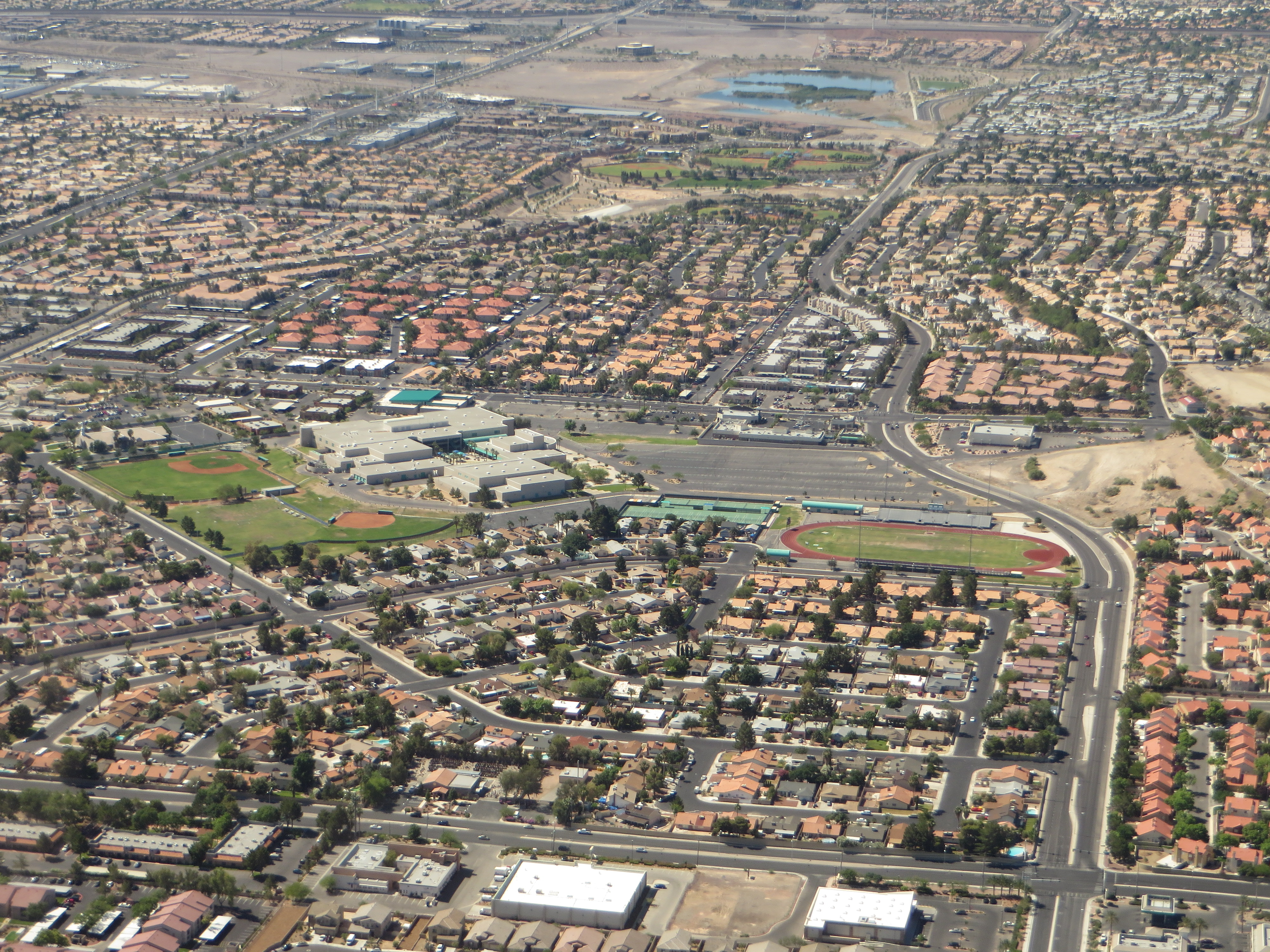
Aerial view of Henderson, suburb of Las Vegas and Nevada's second most populous city

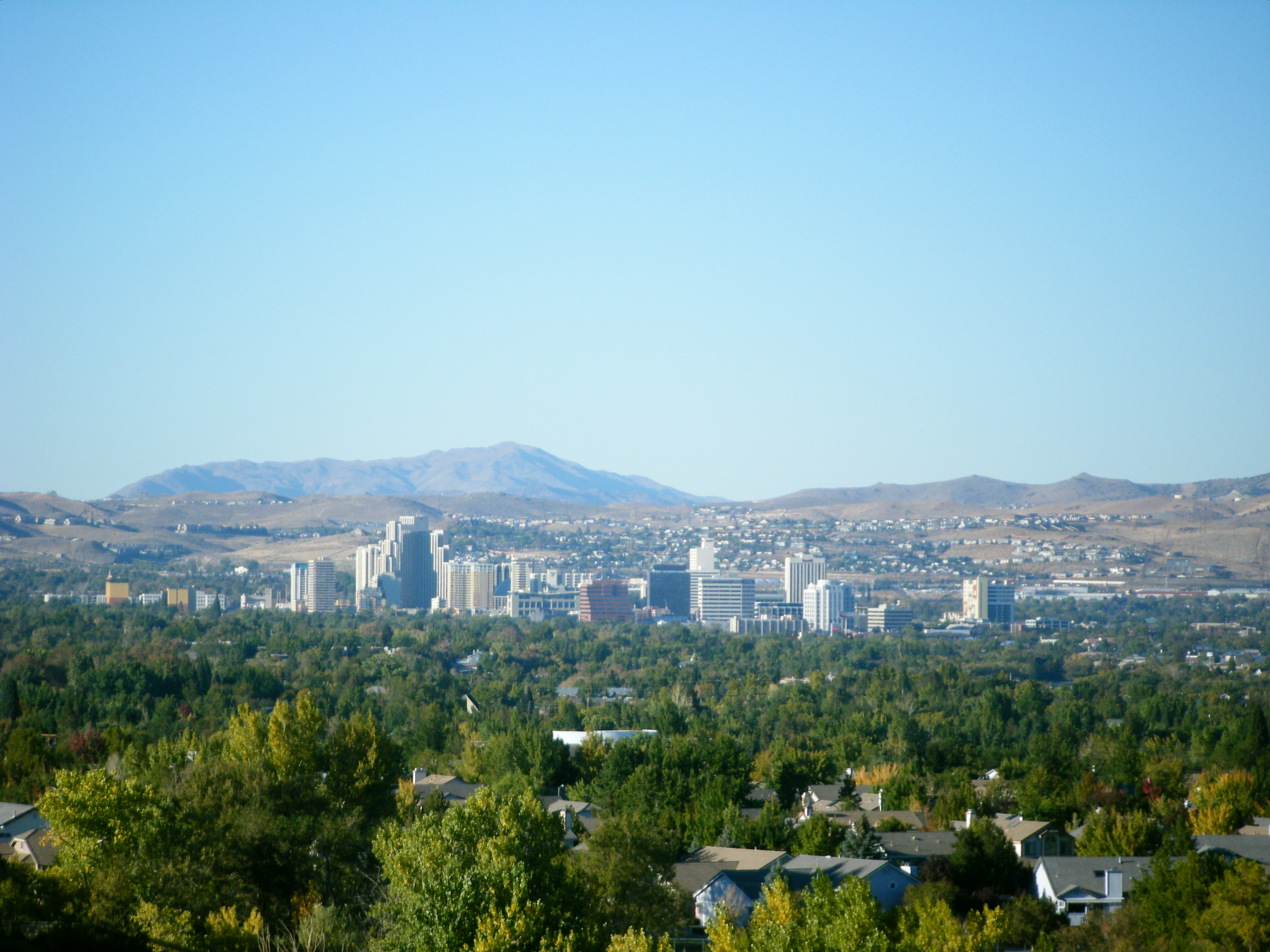
Skyline of Reno, third most populous city in Nevada

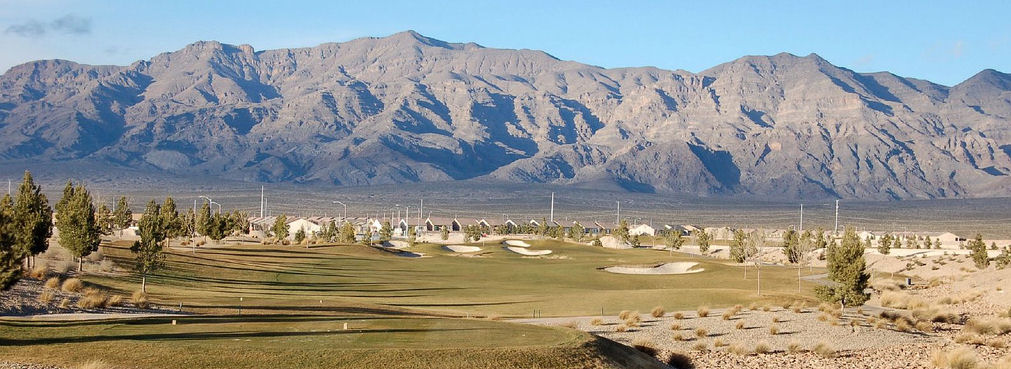
Mountains around North Las Vegas, suburb of Las Vegas

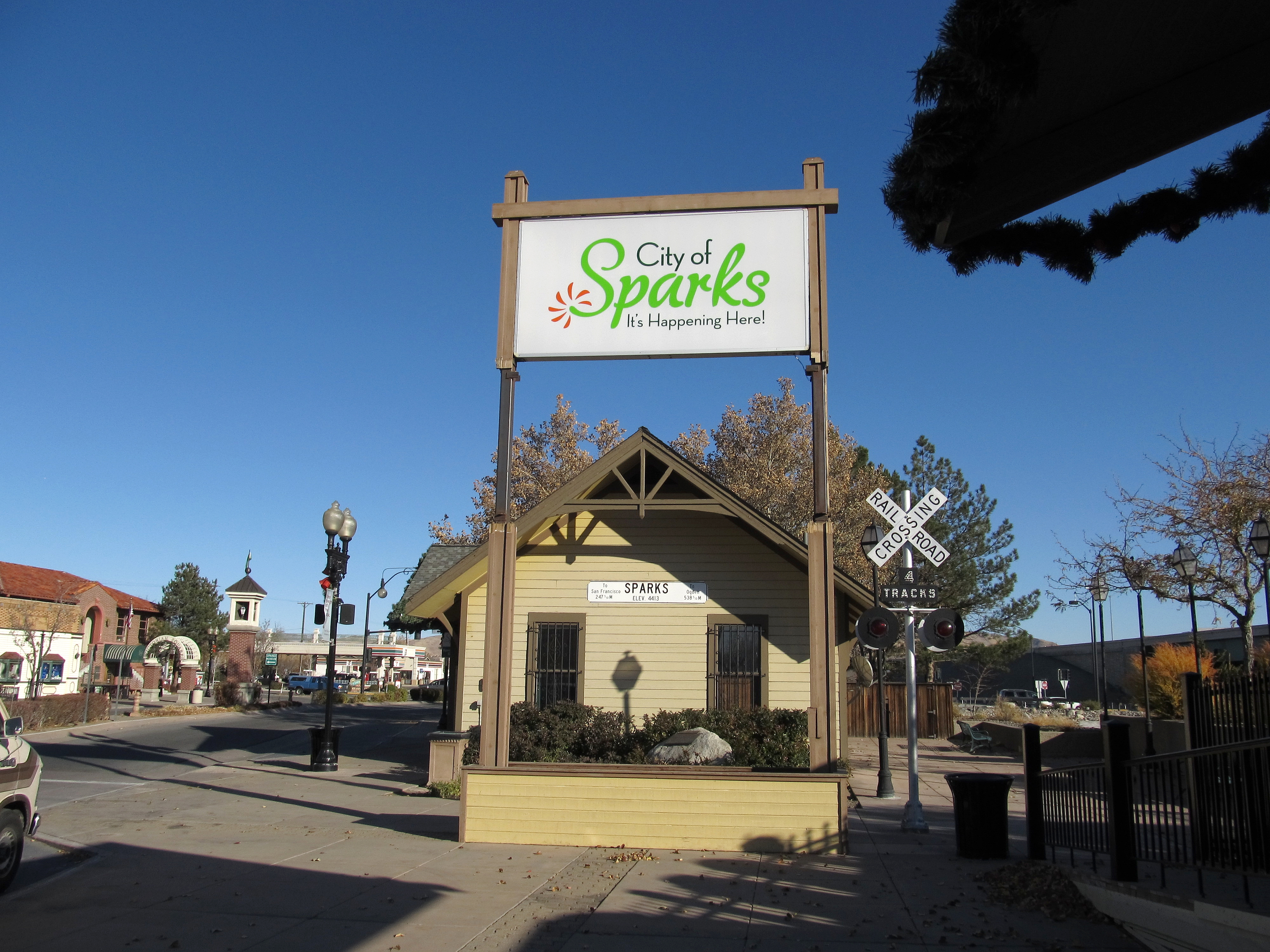
Sparks, suburb of Reno and Nevada's fifth most populous city

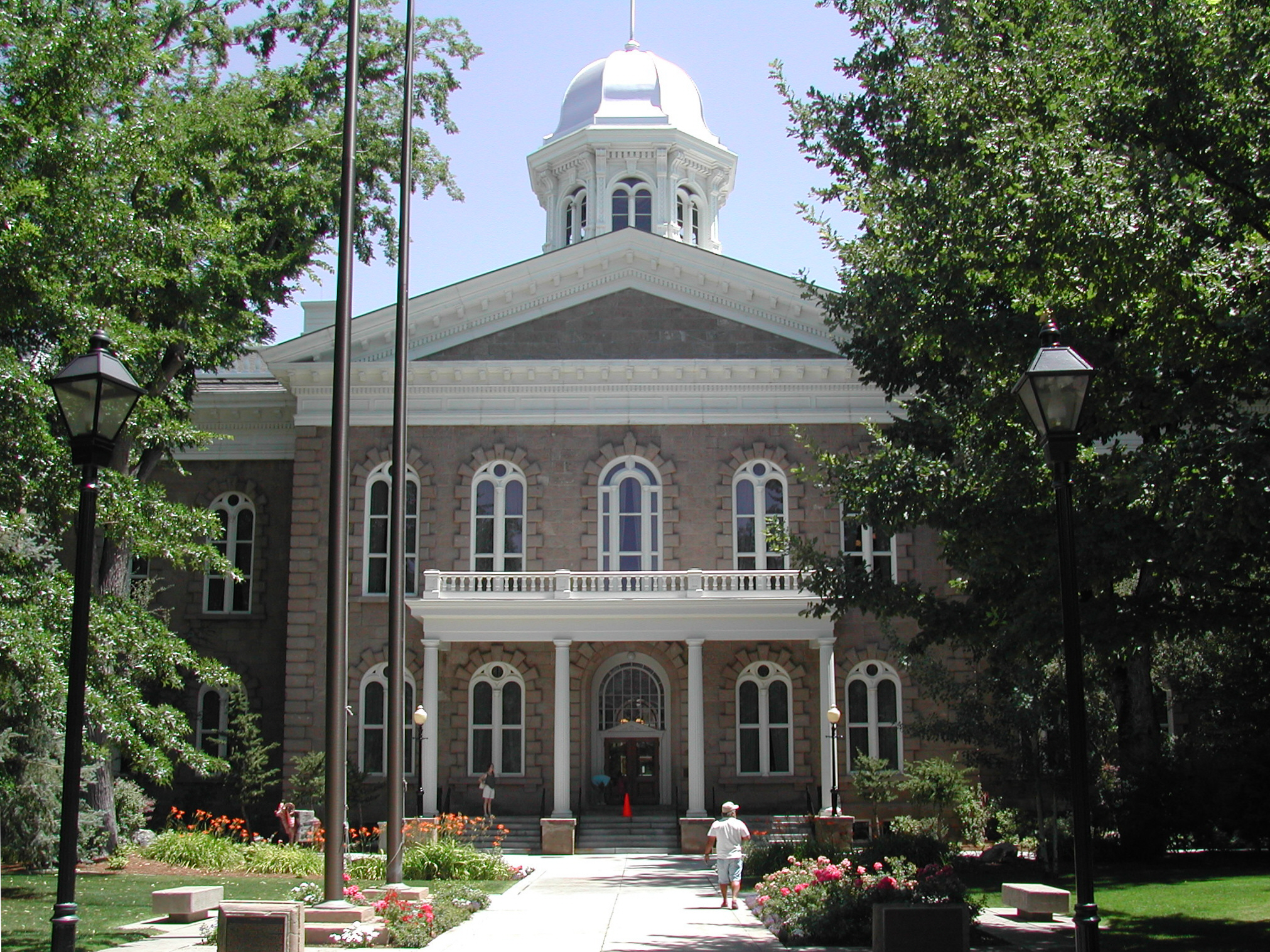
Carson City, Nevada's capital and sixth largest city by population

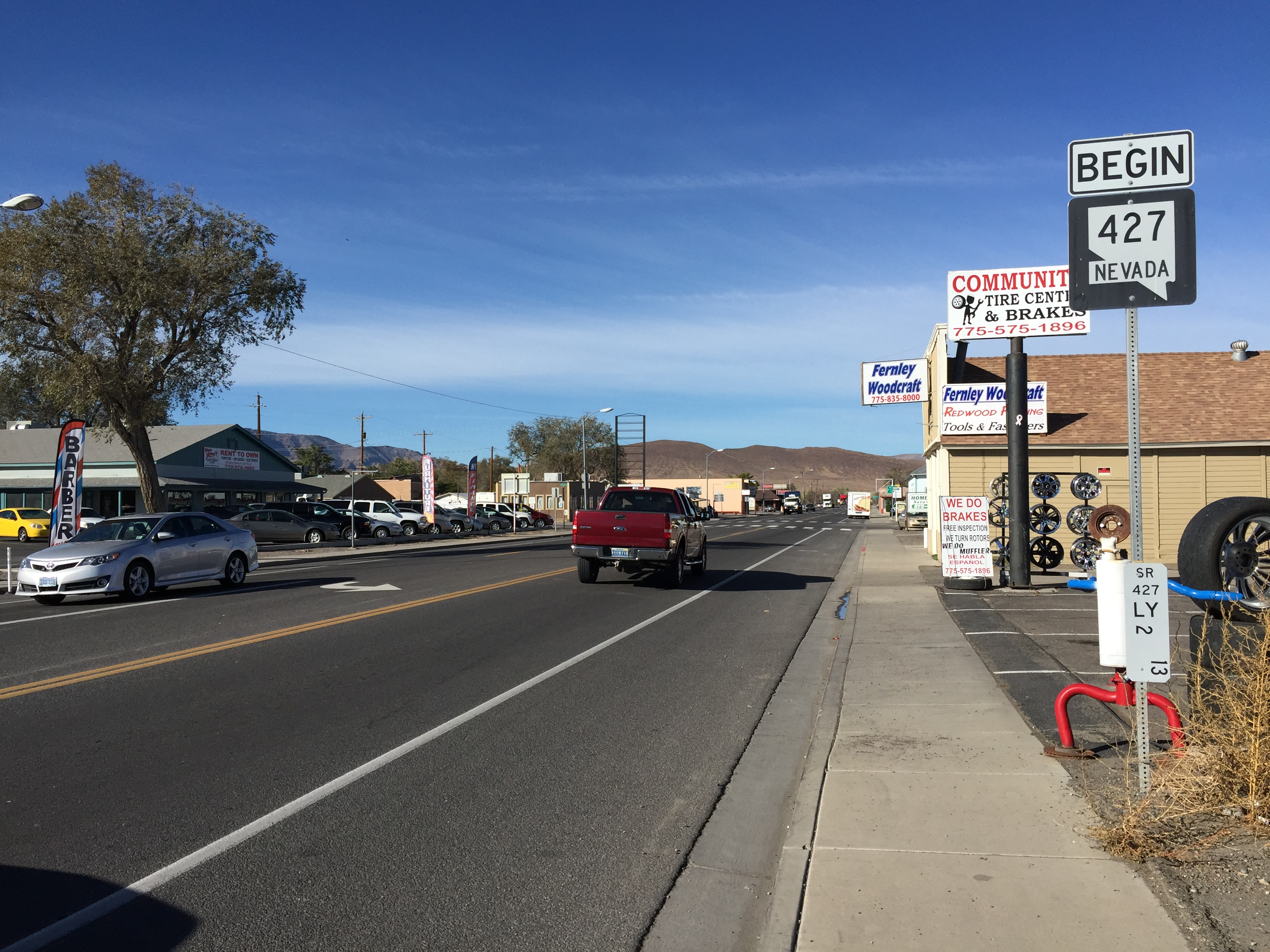
Main street of Nevada's newest city, Fernley

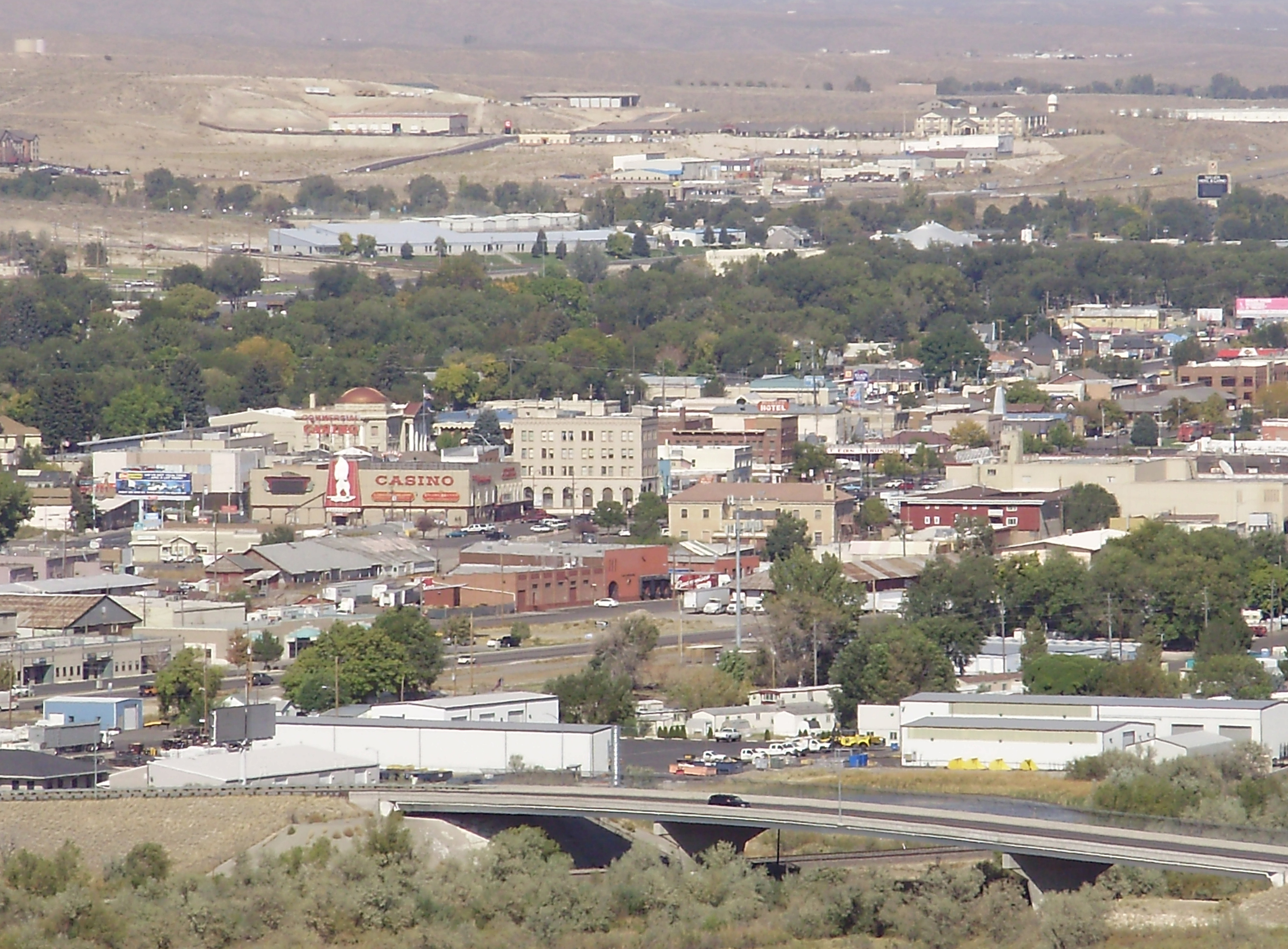
Downtown Elko, eighth most populous city in Nevada

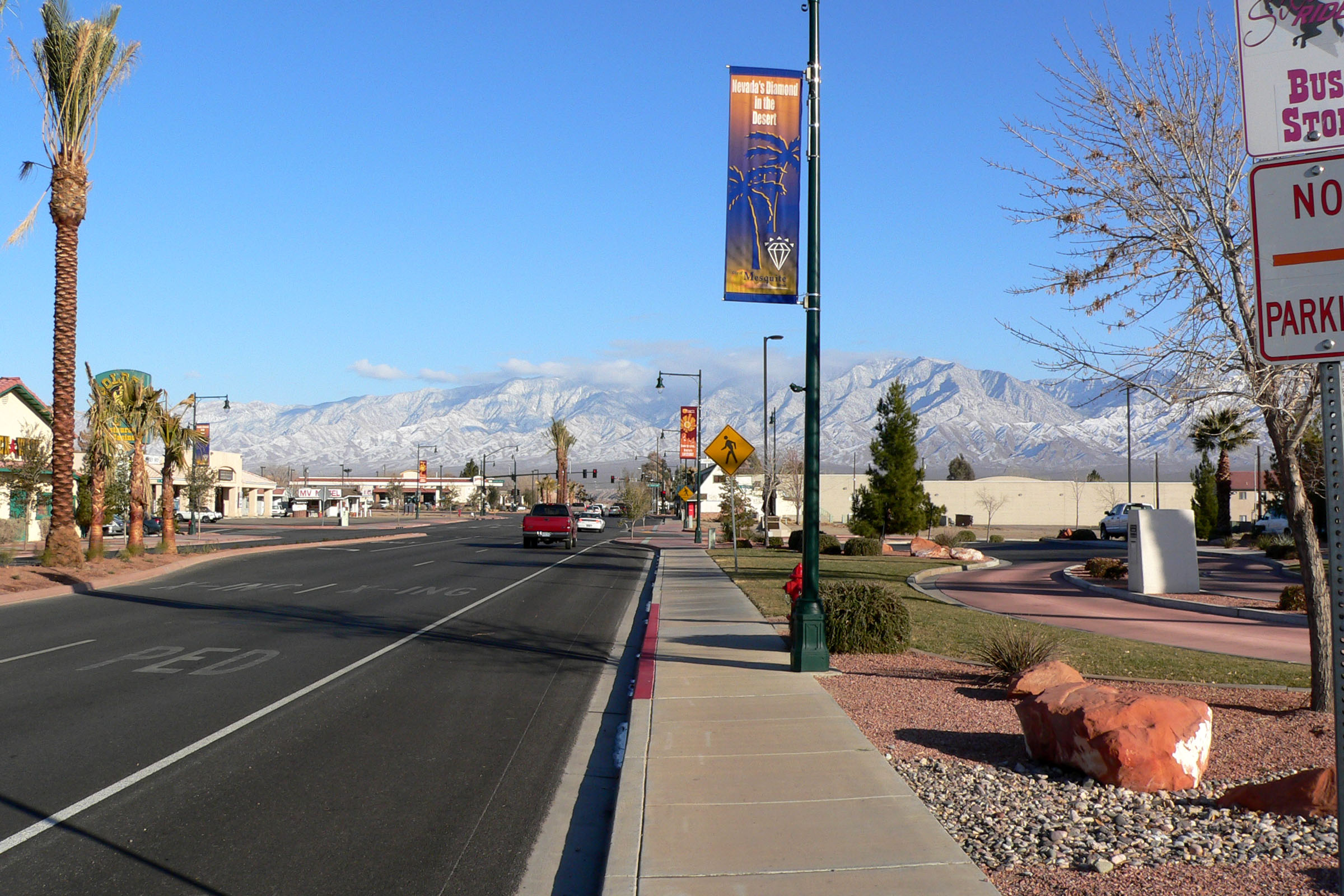
Downtown Mesquite, Nevada's ninth most populous city

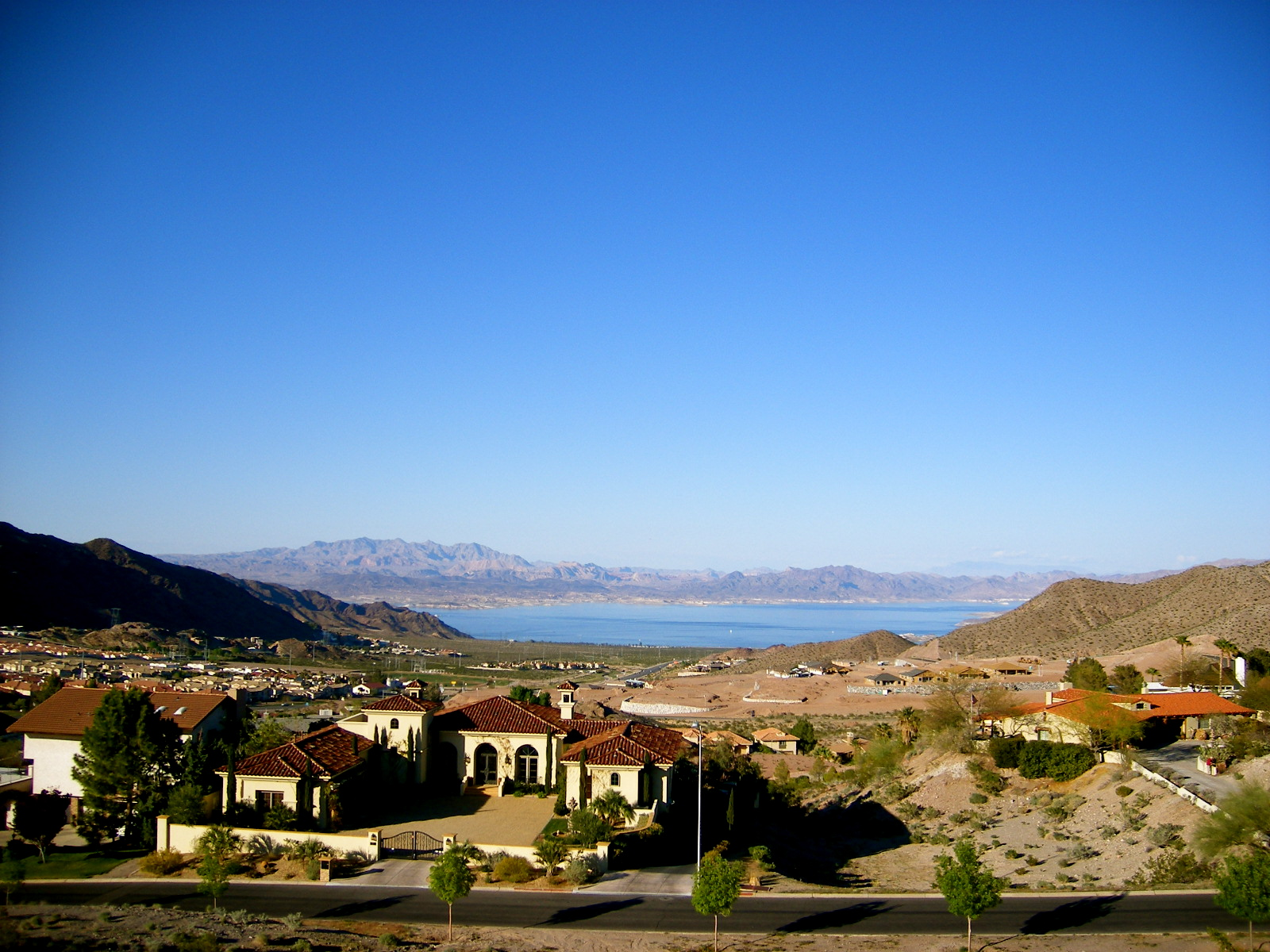
View of Boulder City, Nevada's tenth most populous city, and Lake Mead

‡ State capital and independent city

† County seat

Name	Type	County	Population (2020)	Population (2010)	Change	Land area (2020)		Population density	Incorporation date
Name	Type	County	Population (2020)	Population (2010)	Change	sq mi	km^{2}	Population density	Incorporation date
Boulder City	City	Clark	14,885	15,023	−0.9%	208.27	539.4	71.5/sq mi (27.6/km^{2})	October 1, 1959
Caliente	City	Lincoln	990	1,130	−12.4%	53.02	137.3	18.7/sq mi (7.2/km^{2})	October 1, 1959
Carlin	City	Elko	2,050	2,368	−13.4%	10.44	27.0	196.4/sq mi (75.8/km^{2})	October 22, 1925
Carson City‡	—	None	58,639	55,274	+6.1%	144.53	374.3	405.7/sq mi (156.7/km^{2})	March 1, 1875
Elko†	City	Elko	20,564	18,297	+12.4%	17.85	46.2	1,152.0/sq mi (444.8/km^{2})	March 14, 1917
Ely†	City	White Pine	3,924	4,255	−7.8%	7.63	19.8	514.3/sq mi (198.6/km^{2})	July 20, 1907
Fallon†	City	Churchill	9,327	8,606	+8.4%	3.72	9.6	2,507.3/sq mi (968.1/km^{2})	December 18, 1908
Fernley	City	Lyon	22,895	19,368	+18.2%	121.31	314.2	188.7/sq mi (72.9/km^{2})	July 1, 2001
Henderson	City	Clark	317,610	257,729	+23.2%	106.23	275.1	2,989.8/sq mi (1,154.4/km^{2})	June 8, 1953
Las Vegas†	City	Clark	641,903	583,756	+10.0%	141.83	367.3	4,525.9/sq mi (1,747.4/km^{2})	March 16, 1905
Lovelock†	City	Pershing	1,805	1,894	−4.7%	0.86	2.2	2,098.8/sq mi (810.4/km^{2})	September 26, 1917
Mesquite	City	Clark	20,471	15,276	+34.0%	31.76	82.3	644.6/sq mi (248.9/km^{2})	May 24, 1984
North Las Vegas	City	Clark	262,527	216,961	+21.0%	101.28	262.3	2,592.1/sq mi (1,000.8/km^{2})	May 1, 1946
Reno†	City	Washoe	264,165	225,221	+17.3%	108.77	281.7	2,428.7/sq mi (937.7/km^{2})	March 16, 1903
Sparks	City	Washoe	108,445	90,264	+20.1%	36.44	94.4	2,976.0/sq mi (1,149.0/km^{2})	March 15, 1905
Wells	City	Elko	1,237	1,292	−4.3%	6.90	17.9	179.3/sq mi (69.2/km^{2})	March 28, 1927
West Wendover	City	Elko	4,512	4,410	+2.3%	7.48	19.4	603.2/sq mi (232.9/km^{2})	July 1, 1991
Winnemucca†	City	Humboldt	8,431	7,396	+14.0%	9.78	25.3	862.1/sq mi (332.8/km^{2})	October 13, 1917
Yerington†	City	Lyon	3,121	3,048	+2.4%	29.46	76.3	105.9/sq mi (40.9/km^{2})	March 14, 1907
Total cities	—	—	1,767,501	1,531,568	+15.4%	1,147.56	2,972.2	1,540.2/sq mi (594.7/km^{2})	—
Nevada	—	—	3,104,614	2,700,551	+15.0%	109,781.18	284,332.0	28.3/sq mi (10.9/km^{2})	—

== See also ==
- Unincorporated towns in Nevada
- List of census-designated places in Nevada
- List of counties in Nevada
