= U.S. Route 95 Alternate (Schurz–Fernley, Nevada) =

U.S. Highway between Schurz and Fernley, Nevada, United States

U.S. Route 95 Alternate

Route information
- Maintained by NDOT
- Length: 105 mi (169 km) 71.268 miles (114.695 km) independent of I-80
- Existed: 1941–present

Major junctions
- South end: US 95 in Schurz
- US 50 in Silver Springs; I-80 in Fernley
- North end: I-80 / US 95 in Trinity

Location
- Country: United States
- State: Nevada
- Counties: Mineral, Lyon, Churchill

Highway system
- United States Numbered Highway System; List; Special; Divided; Nevada State Highway System; Interstate; US; State; Pre‑1976; Scenic

In the U.S. state of Nevada, U.S. Route 95 Alternate (US 95 Alt., sometimes referred to as US 95A) is an alternate route of U.S. Route 95 located in the western part of the state. It connects Schurz to Interstate 80 via the cities of Yerington and Fernley.

The highway is one of three routes in Nevada that has existed as US 95 Alt.

== Route description ==
The present US 95 Alt. begins at its junction with US 95 in Schurz and runs west to Yerington. From there, it runs north to Silver Springs (located at the junction with US 50 and Alternate US 50), then continues north to Fernley. Alternate US 95 is routed concurrently with Alternate US 50 from Silver Springs to Fernley.

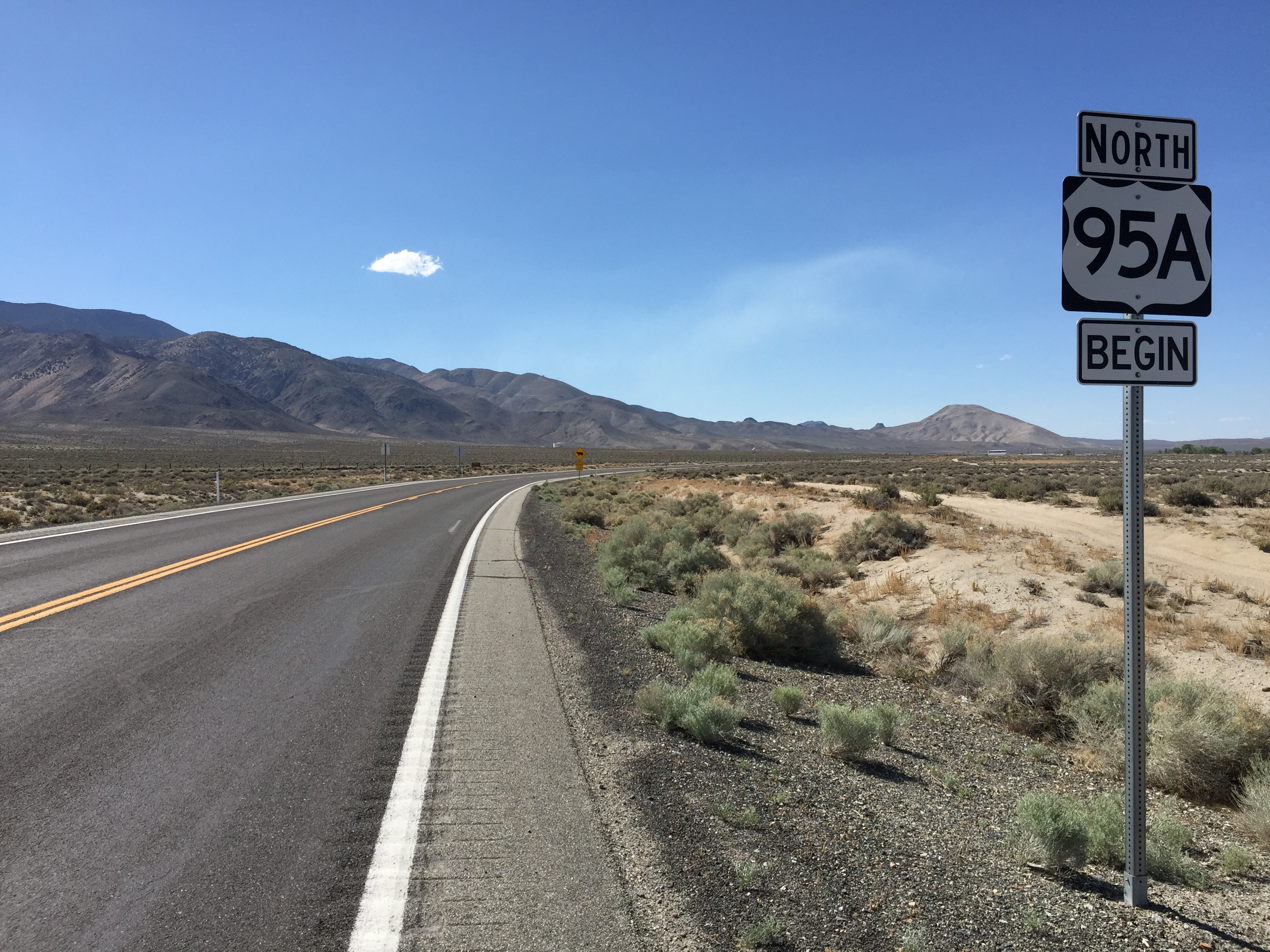
View north from the south end of US 95 Alt. in Schurz as seen in 2015

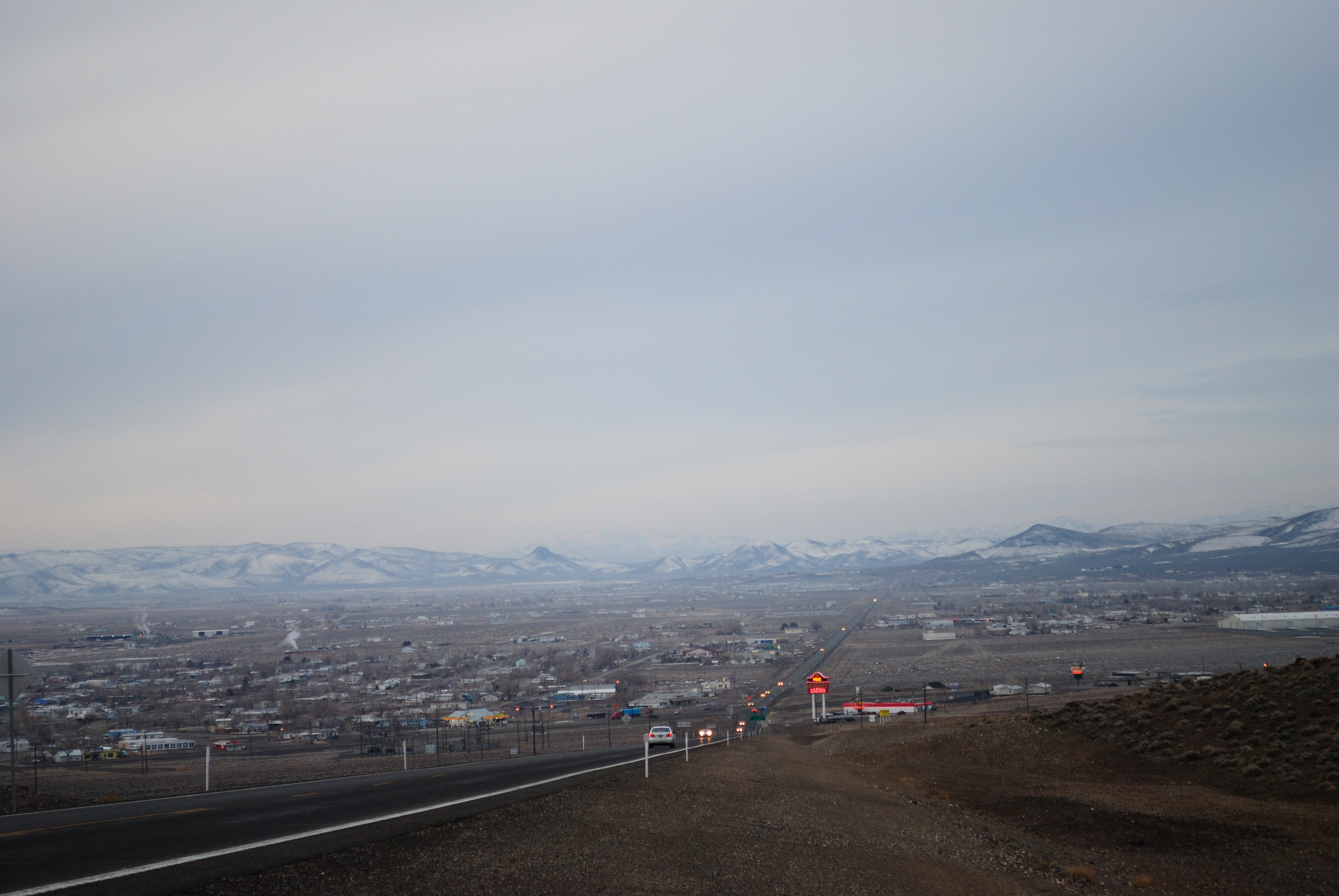
US 95 Alt/US 50 Alt southbound, overlooking Silver Springs and the junction of US 50 as seen in 2010

Nevada's official highway log lists the northern termination of the route at its junction with I-80 at Fernley. However, maps, including Nevada's own official state maps, show the route continuing northeast along I-80 to its junction with mainline US 95 at exit 83.

== History ==
Dates are based on when changes appear on official Nevada state highway maps unless otherwise noted.

The present US 95 Alt. was commissioned in 1941. It ran from its current southern terminus at Schurz to the junction with US 40 and US 95 at Fernley. However, it was displayed on the official 1941 Nevada highway map as US 95, making it appear as if there were two different highways with the same number. The error was corrected on the 1942 map. Alternate US 95 replaced part of SR 3 between Schurz and Yerington; SR 2B from Yerington to present-day Fort Churchill Road, south of Silver Springs; and State Route 1B from Fort Churchill Road to Fernley.

A second US 95 Alt. was created in 1960 due a realignment of mainline US 95. Mainline US 95 was extended due north from Fallon to US 40 over the former SR 1A. The former route of US 95 via Fernley was renumbered as Alternate US 95. Strangely, this placed two different routes numbered as US 95 Alt. in the same area of Nevada with the two meeting at Fernley. This lasted until around 1978, when the route from Fallon to Fernley was renumbered as US 50 Alt., except for the easternmost nine miles (14 km); they had been concurrently numbered as US 50 and retained that number.

== Major intersections ==
Note: Mileposts in Nevada reset at county lines; the start and end mileposts for each county are given in the county column. Mileposts are given only for those portions of US 95 Alternate not concurrent with Interstate 80.

County	Location	mi	km	Destinations	Notes
Mineral; MI 0.00-10.68	Schurz	0.00	0.00	US 95 – Fallon, Hawthorne, Las Vegas	Southern terminus
Lyon; LY 0.00-60.59	Yerington	12.65	20.36	SR 208 west (Main Street) – Wellington, Minden	Eastern terminus of SR 208
Lyon; LY 0.00-60.59	Yerington	13.65	21.97	SR 339 south (Nordyke Road) – Mason, Wellington	Northern terminus of SR 339
Lyon; LY 0.00-60.59	Silver Springs			To SR 439 north (USA Parkway) / Ramsey Weeks Cutoff – Clark, Reno	Serves Tahoe Reno Industrial Center
Lyon; LY 0.00-60.59	Silver Springs	44.25	71.21	US 50 – Carson City, Fallon US 50 Alt. begins	Southern end of US 50 Alt. concurrency
Lyon; LY 0.00-60.59	Fernley	58.36	93.92	I-80 BL west / SR 427 west – Wadsworth, Reno	Southern end of I-80 BL concurrency; eastern terminus of SR 427; former US 40 west
Lyon; LY 0.00-60.59	Fernley	59.70	96.08	US 50 Alt. east / SR 828 east (Farm District Road) – Fallon	Roundabout; northern end of US 50 Alt. concurrency; western terminus of SR 828; U.S. 50 Alt. east and SR 828 east were formerly part of US 95 south/US 95 Alt. south; SR 828 east was formerly part of US 50 Alt. east
Lyon; LY 0.00-60.59	Fernley	60.59	97.51	I-80 west / Truck Inn Way – Reno I-80 BL ends	Interchange; northern end of I-80 BL concurrency; southern end of I-80 concurrency
Lyon; LY 0.00-60.59	Fernley	60.59	97.51	Southern end of freeway	
see I-80 (exits 48 to 83)
Churchill	Trinity			I-80 east / US 95 – Winnemucca, Elko, Salt Lake City, Fallon	Northern end of I-80 concurrency; northern terminus; I-80 east was formerly part of US 40 east
1.000 mi = 1.609 km; 1.000 km = 0.621 mi: Concurrency terminus
