= U.S. Route 50 Alternate (Nevada) =

Alternate highway route in Nevada, United States

U.S. Route 50 Alternate

Route information
- Maintained by NDOT
- Length: 32.371 mi (52.096 km)
- Existed: November 12, 1976–present
- Tourist routes: Lincoln Highway

Major junctions
- West end: US 50 / US 95 Alt. in Silver Springs
- East end: Future I-11 / US 50 in Leeteville Junction

Location
- Country: United States
- State: Nevada
- Counties: Lyon, Churchill

Highway system
- United States Numbered Highway System; List; Special; Divided; Nevada State Highway System; Interstate; US; State; Pre‑1976; Scenic

In the U.S. state of Nevada, U.S. Route 50 Alternate (US 50 Alt., sometimes referred to as US 50A) is an east–west alternate route of U.S. Route 50. The highway splits from US 50 in Silver Springs, heading north to Fernley and then southeast to rejoin US 50 in Leeteville Junction west of Fallon. Over the years, the route has held several numerical highway designations.

== Route description ==
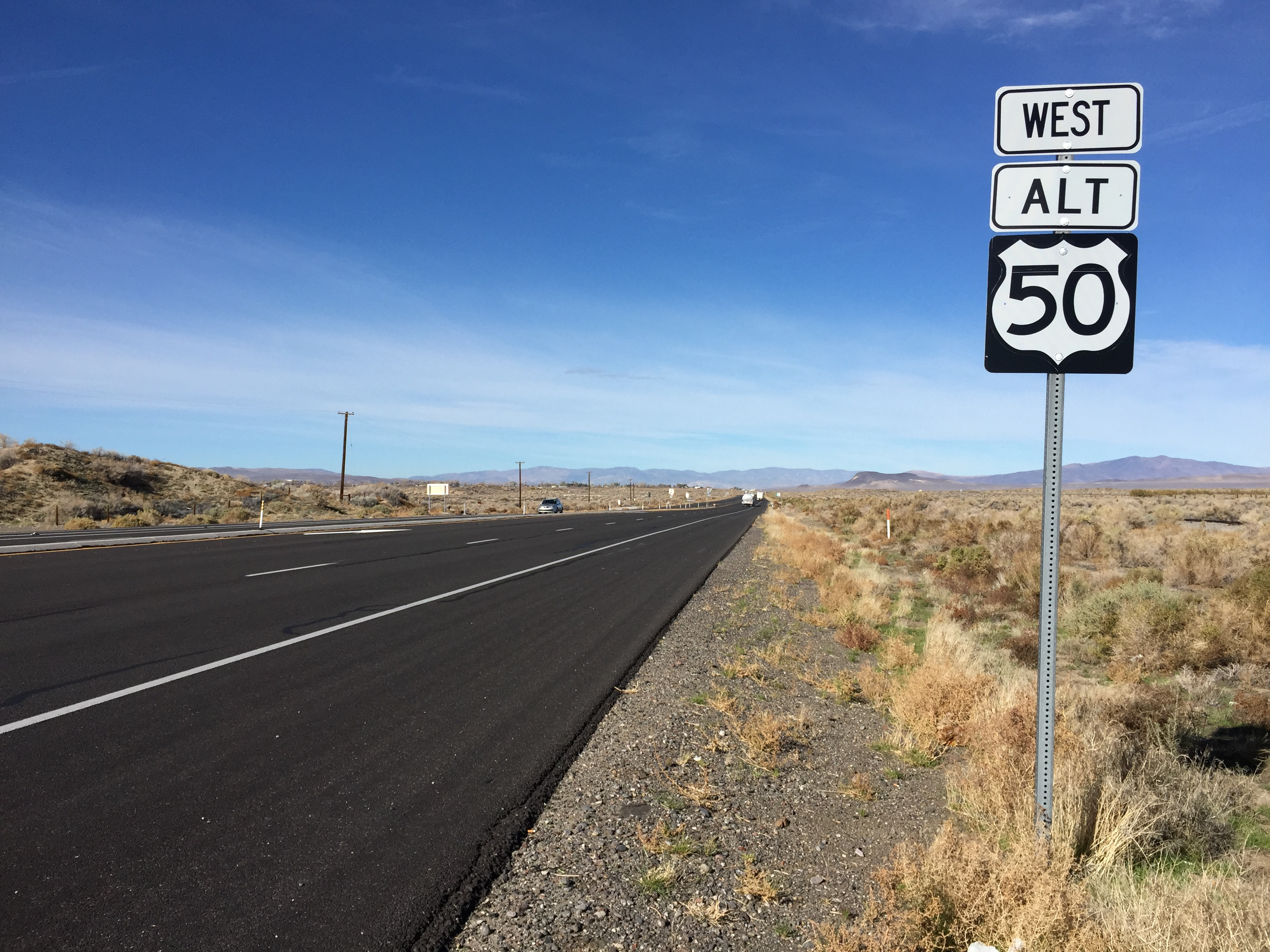
View west from the east end of US 50 Alt. as seen in 2015

Alternate US 50 begins in Silver Springs, at the junction of U.S. Route 50 and U.S. Route 95 Alternate. From there, the highway overlaps with US 95 Alt. for about 14 miles (23 km) as it heads north through Lyon County. Crossing over the Truckee Canal, US 50A/US 95A enter the city of Fernley on Commerce Way. Shortly afterwards, the two routes intersect State Route 427. As SR 427 heads west towards Interstate 80 and Wadsworth, US 50A/US 95A turn east to follow Main Street (old US 40) through Downtown Fernley. After approximately 1 mile (1.6 km), the two routes intersect Farm District Road (State Route 828) at a roundabout on the east end of town. The junction is the site of the former split of the Victory and Lincoln Highways; US 95A turns northeast to join Interstate 80 (old US 40) along the old Victory Highway while US 50A heads southeast following the north branch of the Lincoln Highway.

Outside of Fernley, Alternate US 50 travels about 10 miles (16 km) east to pass through the small community of Hazen. After that, the highway turns southeast and runs about 7 miles (11 km) more to its terminus with US 50 at the Leeteville Junction about 9 miles (14 km) west of downtown Fallon.

== History ==
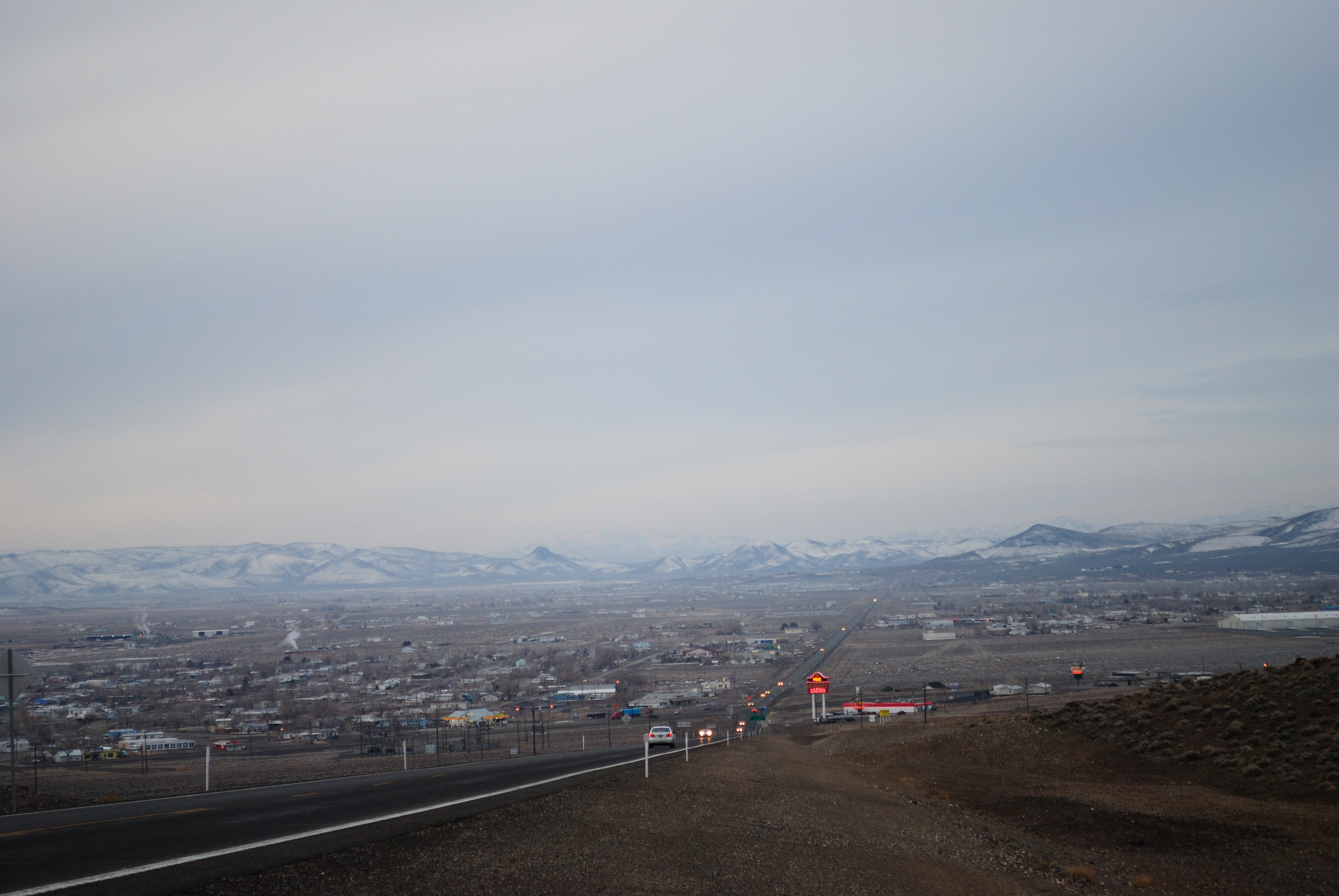
US 50 Alt/US 95 Alt southbound, overlooking Silver Springs and the junction of U.S. Route 50 as seen in 2010

The routing of US 50 Alternate between Fernley and Fallon dates back to the establishment of the Nevada's highway system. The road first became a numbered highway with the designation of State Route 2 in 1917, comprising the western end of the route. This highway had been paved by 1933.

In 1940, the route received a second numerical designation when U.S. Route 95 was extended into Nevada. US 95 followed US 40 (State Route 1) southwest from Winnemucca to Fernley, then backtracked to Fallon along State Route 2 before heading south. The alignment of US 95 was changed to overlap State Route 1A north of Fallon in 1959, rendering the circuitous route through Fernley obsolete. The highway that had been US 95 between Fernley and Fallon was rechristened as U.S. Route 95 Alternate. This action resulted in two separate highways simultaneously carrying the US 95 Alternate designation, as present-day US 95A south of Fernley had been created years earlier.

The dual instances of US 95A remained in place for several years. With Utah having discontinued its portions of US 50 Alternate in the early 1970s, Nevada officials were able to reassign the US 50A designation. Current US 50 Alternate came into existence around the time of Nevada's state highway renumbering in 1976.

While the new number was posted along the road circa 1977 and first seen on Nevada's state highway map in the 1978 edition, the designation had yet to be formally approved. The American Association of State Highway and Transportation Officials (AASHTO, which governs the assignment of U.S. Highway numbers) finally approved the routing at a highway numbering committee meeting held on April 25, 1997, nearly 20 years after US 50A was first signed.

=== Other former routes of US 50 Alternate ===
The current route of US 50 Alternate in Nevada is not the first alignment to bear the designation. The previous alignments are as follows:

- An alternate route may have previously existed in Fallon when US 50 was routed along State Route 119 (Berney Road) and US 95.
- US 50 Alternate was defined to run along what is now US 93 and US 93 Alternate between Ely and West Wendover. From there, it followed US 40 (now Interstate 80) east across the Great Salt Lake Desert in Utah, through Salt Lake City, south along US 91 (now Interstate 15) to rejoin US 50 south of Provo, Utah. This routing had been the former alignment of mainline US 50. Utah discontinued certain overlapping sections of US 50 Alternate in 1972.

== Major intersections ==
Note: Mileposts in Nevada reset at county lines. The start and end mileposts for each county are given in the county column.

County	Location	mi	km	Destinations	Notes
Lyon; LY 0.00–23.27	Silver Springs	0.00	0.00	US 50 / US 95 Alt. south – Carson City, Fallon, Yerington	Western end of US 95 Alt. concurrency; western terminus
Lyon; LY 0.00–23.27	Fernley			I-80 BL west / SR 427 west to I-80 – Wadsworth, Reno	Western end of I-80 BL concurrency; eastern terminus of SR 427; former US 40 west
Lyon; LY 0.00–23.27	Fernley			I-80 BL east / US 95 Alt. north / SR 828 east (Farm District Road) to I-80 – Reno, Winnemucca, Elko, Salt Lake City	Roundabout; eastern end of I-80 BL/US 95 Alt. concurrency; western terminus of SR 828; I-80 BL east/US 95 Alt. north was formerly part of US 40 east/US 95 north; SR 828 east was formerly part of US 50 Alt. east/US 95 south/US 95 Alt. south
Lyon; LY 0.00–23.27	Fernley			SR 828 west (Farm District Road)	Proposed interchange as part of I-11 extension; eastern terminus of SR 828; former US 50 Alt. west/US 95 north/US 95 Alt. north
Churchill; CH 0.00–9.29	Leeteville Junction	9.29	14.95	Future I-11 south / US 50 – Fallon, Carson City	Proposed interchange; eastern terminus; US 50 east was formerly part of US 95 south/US 95 Alt. south
1.000 mi = 1.609 km; 1.000 km = 0.621 mi: Concurrency terminus

== See also ==
Lincoln Highway
Previous state: California	Nevada	Next state: Utah
