= Nevada State Route 427 =

Highway in Nevada

State Route 427
- Interstate 80 Business, Main Street, Old US 40
- SR 427 highlighted in red

Route information
- Maintained by NDOT
- Length: 4.700 mi (7.564 km)
- Existed: July 1, 1976–present

Major junctions
- West end: I-80 in Wadsworth
- I-80 in Fernley
- East end: I-80 BL / US 50 Alt. / US 95 Alt. in Fernley

Location
- Country: United States
- State: Nevada
- Counties: Washoe, Lyon

Highway system
- Interstate Highway System; Main; Auxiliary; Suffixed; Business; Future; Nevada State Highway System; Interstate; US; State; Pre‑1976; Scenic
| ← SR 425 | → SR 430 |

State Route 427 (SR 427) is a 4.7-mile-long (7.6 km) state highway in the U.S. state of Nevada. It connects the community of Wadsworth in eastern Washoe County to the city of Fernley in western Lyon County. SR 427 comprises the former routing of U.S. Route 40 (US 40) through the towns it serves. SR 427 also provides an eastern link to Pyramid Lake via a junction with State Route 447 in Wadsworth.

== Route description ==
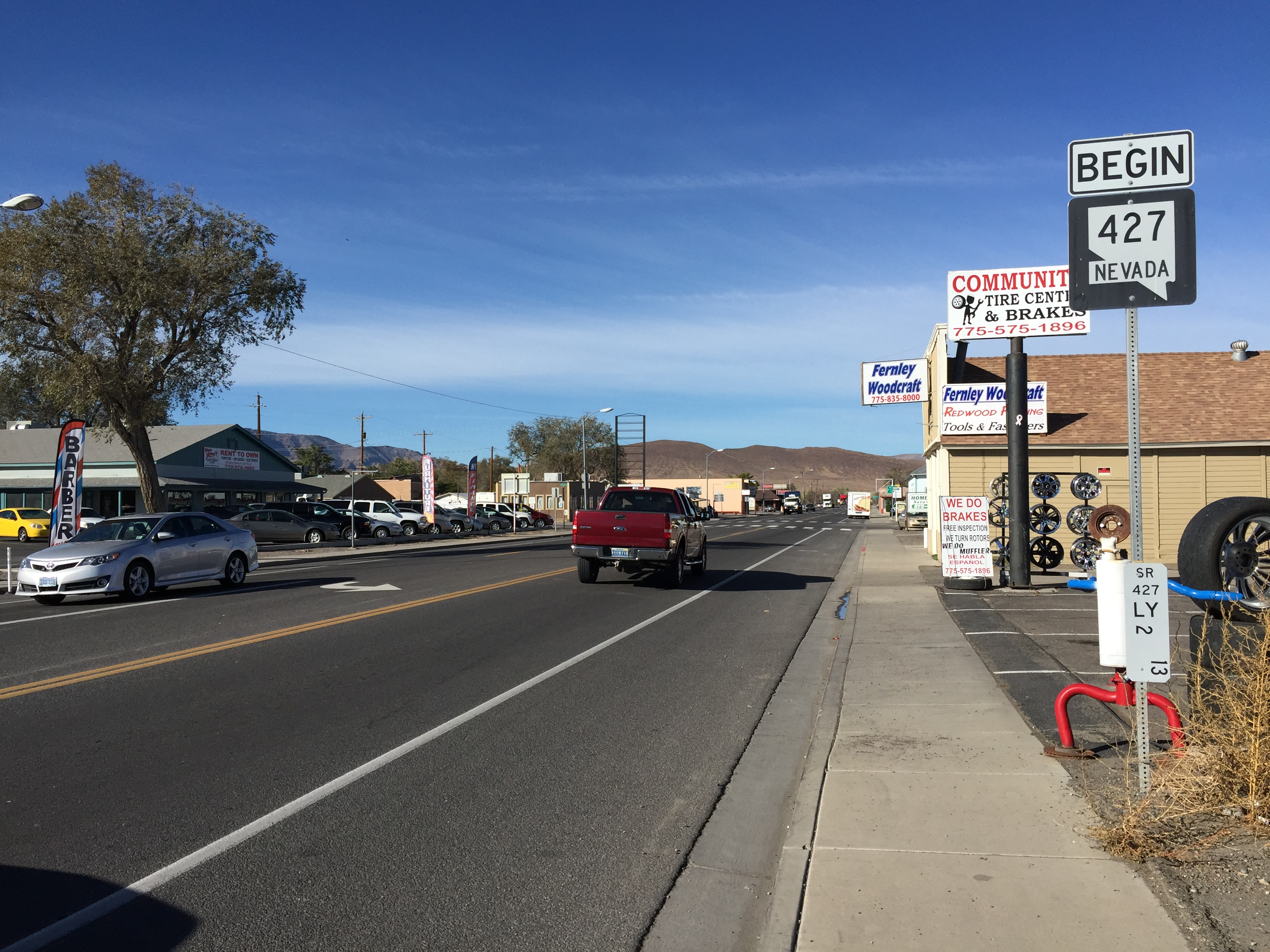
View from the east end of SR 427 looking westbound as seen in 2015

SR 427 begins at a cattleguard on Cantlon Drive just south of the Wadsworth/Pyramid Lake interchange (Exit 43) on Interstate 80 (I-80) in Washoe County. The highway proceeds northeast from there to meet State Route 447 in the middle of Wadsworth. The route curves southeast through the town and immediately enters Lyon County. Passing south under I-80 once again, as well as the Union Pacific railroad tracks, SR 427 curves east to follow Main Street/Truckee Lane into Fernley. The highway ends at the intersection with US 50 Alt. and US 95 Alt. in Downtown Fernley.

== History ==
Originally, US 40 followed the routing of SR 427 through Wadsworth and Fernley. Completion of I-80 around both cities (and many other northern Nevada cities) made the U.S. highway designation irrelevant and US 40 was later removed from the highway system.

== Major intersections ==
Note: Mileposts in Nevada reset at county lines; the start and end mileposts are given in the county column.

| County | Location | mi | km | Destinations | Notes |
|---|---|---|---|---|---|
| Washoe; 0.00–2.57 | Wadsworth | 0.000 | 0.000 | I-80 – Reno, Elko | Western end of I-80 Bus. overlap |
| Washoe; 0.00–2.57 | Wadsworth | | | SR 447 north (Washeim Street) – Gerlach, Pyramid Lake | |
| Lyon; 0.00–2.13 | Fernley | | | I-80 – Reno, Elko | |
| Lyon; 0.00–2.13 | Fernley | 4.700 | 7.564 | I-80 BL east / US 50 Alt. / US 95 Alt. – Elko, Fallon, Yerington | Eastern end of I-80 Bus. overlap |
1.000 mi = 1.609 km; 1.000 km = 0.621 mi: Concurrency terminus
