= Fernley Hills =

Mountain range in Nevada, United States

- Location within Nevada

Highest point
- Elevation: 1,536 m (5,039 ft)

Geography
- Country: United States
- State: Nevada
- District: Lyon County
- Range coordinates: 39°31′33.691″N 119°8′33.592″W
- Topo map: USGS Fernley East

The Fernley Hills are a mountain range southeast of Fernley in Lyon County, Nevada. Temperatures in this mountain range average summer highs around 94 °F (34 °C) and winter lows around 23 °F (−5 °C).
