= Schurz, Nevada =

- Census-designated place
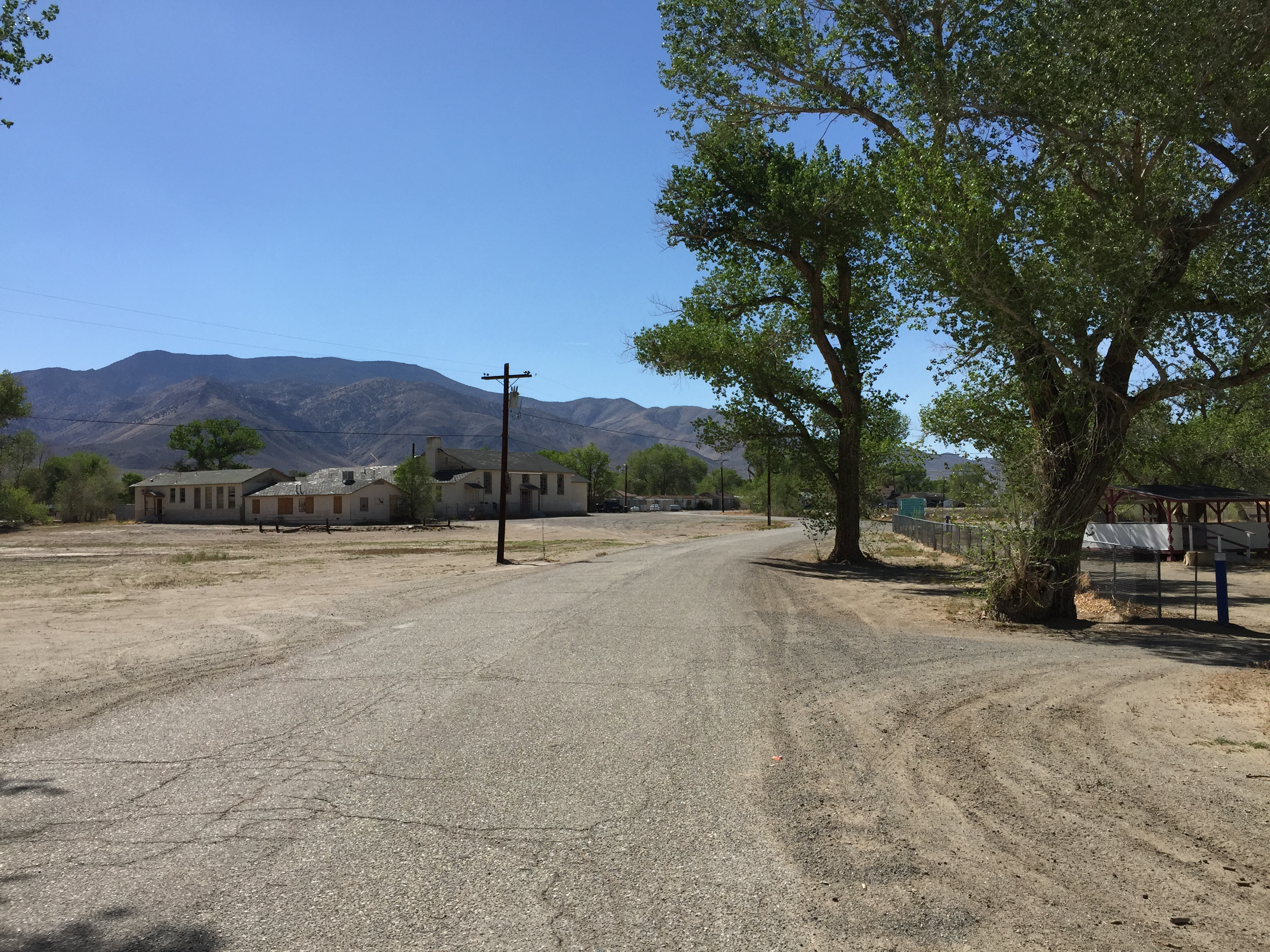
- Side road in Schurz

- Location in Mineral County and the state of Nevada
- Coordinates: 38°57′56″N 118°49′37″W
- Country: United States
- State: Nevada
- County: Mineral
- Founded: 1891; 135 years ago
- Named for: Carl Schurz

Area
  - Total: 11.46 sq mi (29.68 km^{2})
  - Land: 11.24 sq mi (29.10 km^{2})
  - Water: 0.22 sq mi (0.57 km^{2})
- Elevation: 4,127 ft (1,258 m)

Population (2020)
  - Total: 656
  - Density: 58.4/sq mi (22.54/km^{2})
- Time zone: UTC-8 (PST)
  - Summer (DST): UTC-7 (PDT)
- ZIP code: 89427
- Area code: 775
- FIPS code: 32-65400
- GNIS feature ID: 0858175

Schurz is an unincorporated community and census-designated place (CDP) in Mineral County, Nevada, United States, named after Secretary of the Interior Carl Schurz. The population was 656 at the 2020 census. It is located on the Walker River Indian Reservation and is the burial place of Wovoka, the Paiute messiah who originated the Ghost Dance movement.

== History ==
Schurz was founded in 1891. The town was named after Secretary of the Interior Carl Schurz. A post office has been in operation at Schurz since 1891.

== Geography ==
Schurz is located in northwestern Mineral County at the junction of U.S. Route 95 and U.S. Route 95 Alternate. U.S. 95 leads south 34 miles (55 km) to Hawthorne, the Mineral county seat, and north 37 miles (60 km) to Fallon, while U.S. 95A leads west 23 miles (37 km) to Yerington.

According to the U.S. Census Bureau, the Schurz CDP has a total area of 11.5 square miles (30 km^{2}), all land.

== Demographics ==
Historical population
Census	Pop.	Note	%±
2000	721		—
2010	658		−8.7%
2020	656		−0.3%
U.S. Decennial Census

As of the census of 2000, there were 721 people, 281 households, and 180 families residing in the CDP. The population density was 11.9 inhabitants per square mile (4.6/km^{2}). There were 312 housing units at an average density of 5.2 per square mile (2.0/km^{2}). The racial makeup of the CDP was 9.99% White, 0.69% African American, 83.63% Native American, 0.14% Asian, 0.14% Pacific Islander, 1.66% from other races, and 3.74% from two or more races. Hispanic or Latino of any race were 9.57% of the population.

There were 281 households, out of which 35.2% had children under the age of 18 living with them, 37.4% were married couples living together, 20.6% had a female householder with no husband present, and 35.6% were non-families. 28.8% of all households were made up of individuals, and 8.9% had someone living alone who was 65 years of age or older. The average household size was 2.57 and the average family size was 3.17.

In the CDP, the population was spread out, with 32.9% under the age of 18, 8.2% from 18 to 24, 25.4% from 25 to 44, 21.6% from 45 to 64 and 11.9% who were 65 years of age or older. The median age was 35 years. For every 100 females, there were 95.9 males. For every 100 females age 18 and over, there were 88.3 males.

The median income for a household in the CDP was $24,265, and the median income for a family was $26,964. Males had a median income of $29,375 versus $23,958 for females. The per capita income for the CDP was $10,886. About 19.8% of families and 26.5% of the population were below the poverty line, including 23.7% of those under age 18 and 30.6% of those age 65 or over.

== Climate ==
The Köppen Climate System classifies the weather in this area as semi-arid, abbreviated BSk. This climate type occurs primarily on the periphery of true deserts in low-latitude semiarid steppe regions.

Climate data for Schurz, Nevada
Month	Jan	Feb	Mar	Apr	May	Jun	Jul	Aug	Sep	Oct	Nov	Dec	Year
Mean daily maximum °C (°F)	8 (46)	12 (53)	16 (61)	20 (68)	24 (76)	29 (84)	34 (93)	33 (92)	29 (84)	22 (72)	15 (59)	9 (49)	21 (70)
Mean daily minimum °C (°F)	−8 (17)	−6 (22)	−3 (27)	1 (33)	5 (41)	8 (47)	12 (53)	10 (50)	5 (41)	0 (32)	−4 (24)	−7 (19)	1 (34)
Average precipitation mm (inches)	13 (0.5)	13 (0.5)	10 (0.4)	13 (0.5)	15 (0.6)	10 (0.4)	7.6 (0.3)	7.6 (0.3)	7.6 (0.3)	10 (0.4)	10 (0.4)	15 (0.6)	140 (5.4)
Source: Weatherbase
