= David Fernley =

South African cricketer (1934–2009)

Personal information
- Born: 29 May 1934; Murree, India
- Died: 28 April 2009 (aged 74); KwaZulu-Natal, South Africa
- Source: Cricinfo, 17 December 2020

David Fernley (29 May 1934 – 28 April 2009) was a South African cricketer. He played in eleven first-class matches from 1954/55 to 1963/64.
