= Alternate route =

Special route connecting a major highway to additional towns

Types of special routes in the United States

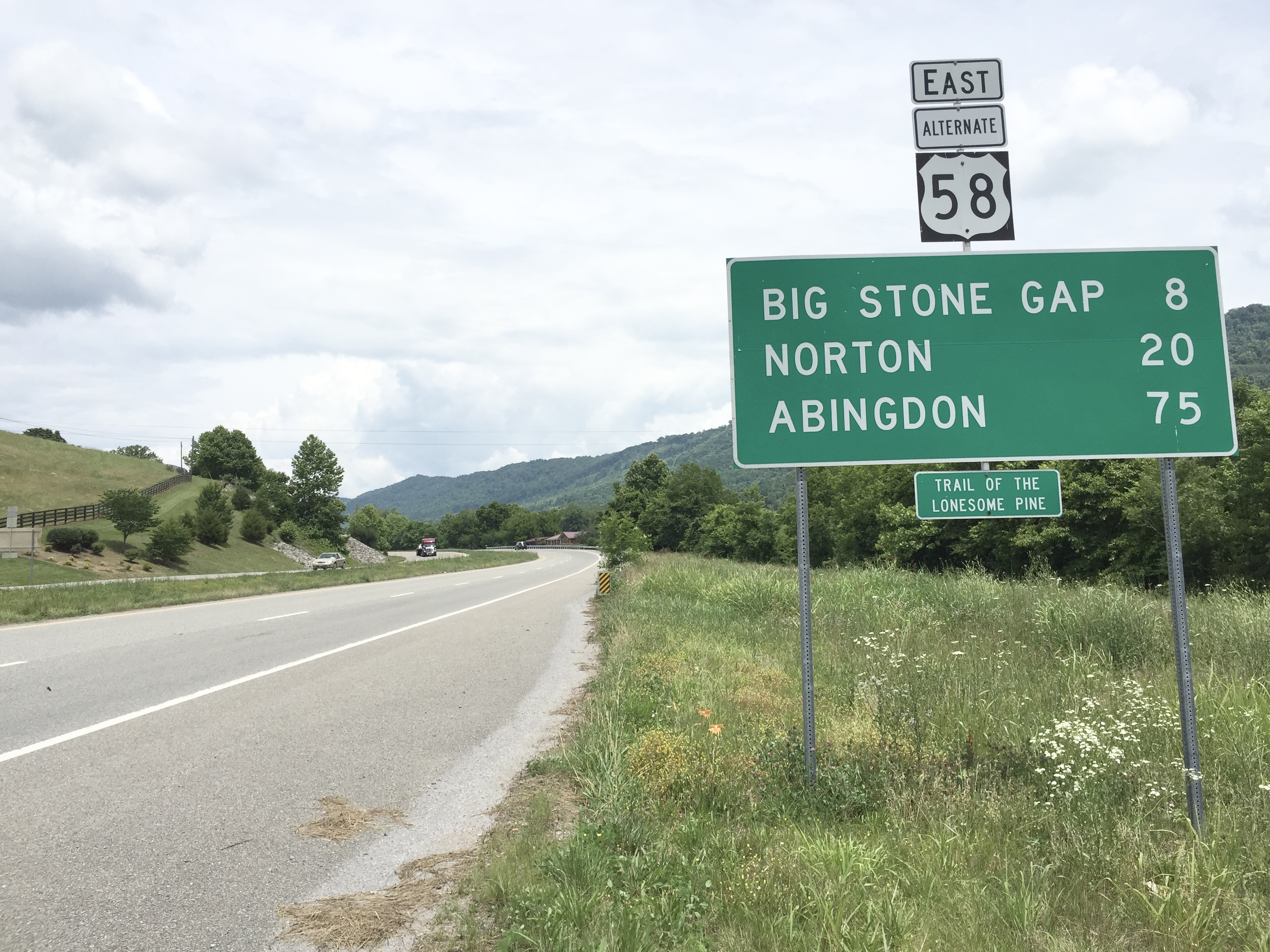
U.S. Route 58 Alternate serves as an alternate alignment to U.S. Route 58 in the western part of Virginia

GA 52 Alt. in Chatsworth, Georgia

An official alternate route is a special route in the United States that provides an alternate alignment for a highway. They are loop roads and found in many road systems in the United States including the U.S. Highway system and various state and county route systems. Alternate routes were created as a means of connecting a town (or towns) desired to be on a route that had been routed differently to put another important town or city on the route, or, in the case of the U.S. Highway system, as a means to eliminate divided routes.

The term "optional route" has also been used. In some cases, an additional business route exists as a third alignment, as with former U.S. Route 71 Alternate, which bypassed Joplin, Missouri.

AASHTO defines and specifies that alternate routes of the US Route system shall have the following behavior:

An "Alternate Route" shall be considered a route which starts at a point where it branches off from the main numbered route, may pass through certain cities and towns, and then connect back with the regular route some miles distant. Since it is the purpose of the U.S. numbered system to mark the best and shortest route available, an alternate route should be designated only where both routes are needed to accommodate the traffic demand, and when the alternate route has substantially the same geometric and structural design standards of the main marked routing. It is recommended that in case an alternate route is marked, that the shorter and better constructed route be given the regular number and the other section designated as the "Alternate Route". It is further recommended that the Highway Department erect signs at the junction points of the regular and alternate routes giving the distance between the cities or points concerned... In no instance should an alternate routing be used for the purpose of keeping an obsolete section on the U.S. numbered system after a new routing has been constructed and available to traffic.

In at least one case, the banner "Optional Route" was retained when a second alternate route existed. One example occurred in Kansas City, Missouri, with U.S. Route 40, which had an alternate and an optional route simultaneously.

In some US states, an alternate route will be designated by adding an "A" after the number instead of a sign marked "Alternate" above it: "US 69A" means "US 69 Alternate".

== See also ==
- List of business routes of the Interstate Highway System
- Bypass (road)
- List of special routes of the United States Numbered Highway System
