= Fernley, Nevada =

City in Nevada, United States

- City
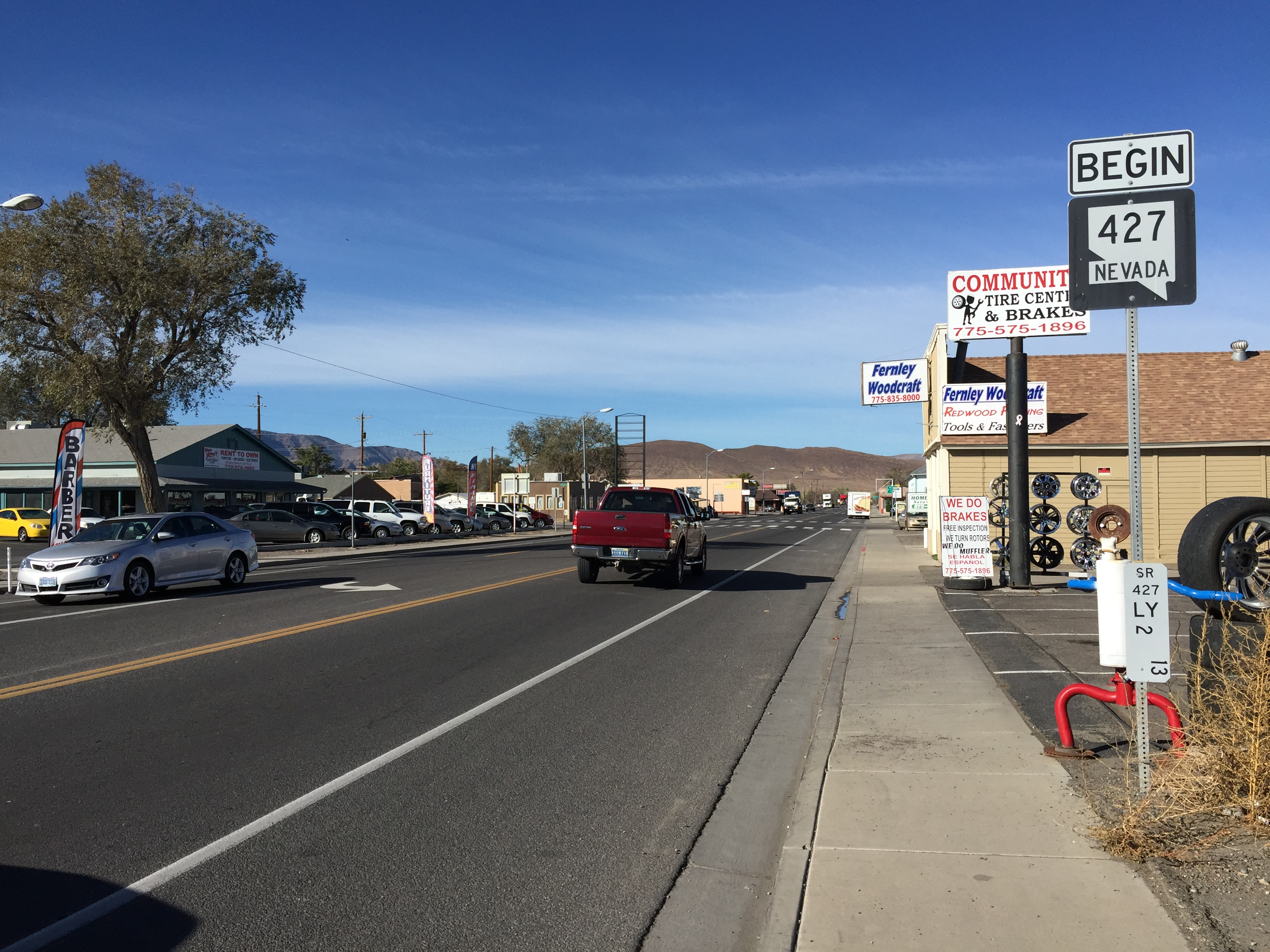
- Main Street in Fernley

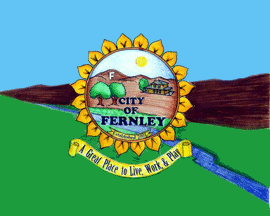
- Flag Seal
- Motto(s): "A Great Place to Live, Work, and Play"
- Location of Fernley, Nevada
- Coordinates: 39°35′55″N 119°12′54″W
- Country: United States
- State: Nevada
- County: Lyon
- Founded: 1904; 122 years ago
- Incorporated: July 1, 2001; 25 years ago

Government
  - Mayor: Tim Bickerton

Area
  - Total: 128.39 sq mi (332.52 km^{2})
  - Land: 121.65 sq mi (315.07 km^{2})
  - Water: 6.73 sq mi (17.44 km^{2})
- Elevation: 4,636 ft (1,413 m)

Population (2020)
  - Total: 22,895
  - Density: 188.2/sq mi (72.67/km^{2})
- Time zone: UTC-8 (PST)
  - Summer (DST): UTC-7 (PDT)
- ZIP code: 89408
- Area code: 775
- FIPS code: 32-24900
- GNIS feature ID: 2410499
- Website: www.cityoffernley.org

Fernley is a city in Lyon County, Nevada, United States, and part of the Reno–Tahoe–Sparks metropolitan area CSA. The city was incorporated in 2001. The population of the city was 22,895 at the 2020 census, making it the 7th most populous city in Nevada.

Fernley was home to the historic and one of the first Amazon.com centers in the world, which has since relocated within the metro area. Naval Air Station (TOPGUN), the U.S. Navy's Naval Strike and Air Warfare Center & TOPGUN training program since 1996, was moved nearby, to Fallon, from Naval Air Station Miramar. The city is home to the Reno-Fernley Raceway. The world's first Tesla Gigafactory, that produces battery packs, energy storage and electric vehicle components is nearby 15 miles west at the Tahoe Reno Industrial Center, and also there as of 2024 an under-construction lithium processing plant.

== History ==
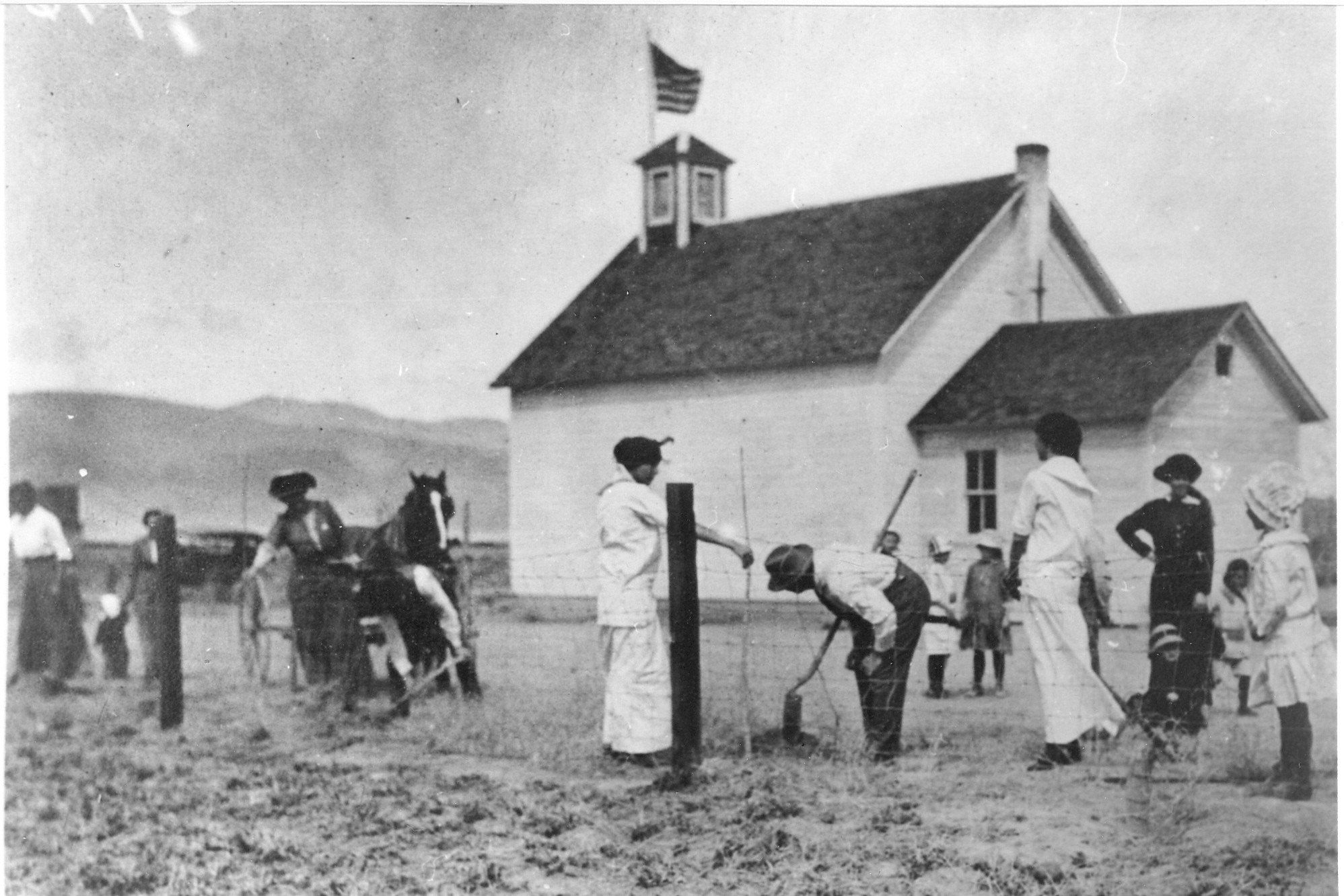
Fernley schoolhouse

Fernley, established in 1904, developed as primarily an agricultural and ranching community in proximity to Reno. It is unknown why the name "Fernley" was applied to this community. It, along with the defunct settlement of Fernley, California are the only two known places in the world to have the name Fernley.

Much of the farmland in the Fernley area was developed through the Newlands Irrigation Project, which was a result of the Newlands Reclamation Act of 1902. The project established an irrigation system that delivers water to an area stretching from Derby Dam, along the Truckee River, to the Lahontan Reservoir near Fallon, Nevada. Construction and expansion of the system took place from the inception through the 1960s. Many of the concrete irrigation headgates, still in use today, are embossed with the CCC (Civilian Conservation Corps) stamp and date of construction. In addition to the irrigation system in the Fernley area, a drainage system was also constructed to carry away excess water and mineral salts from the farmlands. This system consists of channels (5 to 15 feet (1.5 to 4.6 m) deep) dug adjacent to fields; it eventually terminates in the sink northeast of Fernley. The irrigation system is administered and maintained through the Truckee–Carson Irrigation District.

The Southern Pacific Railroad completed the Fernley and Lassen Railway in 1914. The transcontinental Lincoln/Victory Highways was built through town in the 1920s.

In 1965, the Nevada Cement Company started operation in a new plant built on the north side of the city between Fernley and Wadsworth. This was the first significant non-agricultural/ranching business to come to Fernley, aside from the railroad. Primary employment in Fernley began a steady transition to an industrial and commuter base. Beginning in the 1970s, parts of the formerly agricultural and ranching-based lands were transitioning to housing subdivisions to support the growing population, much of which was spilling over from rapid growth in the Reno-Sparks area. Close proximity to Interstate 80 and abundant land for housing made Fernley an attractive alternative to the increasingly congested and expensive Truckee Meadows housing market. Beginning near the established parts of the town, growth moved to the Fremont Street area in the mid to late 1970s, nearer farming areas in the 1980s, and has continued along the Farm District Road areas to the present. Numerous subdivisions were built along the Farm District Road, including an 18-hole golf course and a new elementary school.

In 1999, Amazon.com opened a 750,000-square-foot (70,000 m^{2}) order fulfillment center in the industrial park located in the northeast side of the city, following major initiatives and investments by investors from Seattle. Stanley Works had previously used the facility; Amazon.com moved west to Reno, NV and has redesigned the interior systems and greatly expanded the capacity in the years since. The investment has provided thousands of new jobs for the city and invigorated the economy in the metropolitan area. Since that time, more companies have opened facilities in the park, including Trex Inc., Allied Signal, UPS Worldwide Logistics (Honeywell), ARE Campers, Johns Manville. Sherwin Williams Paint and the newly constructed Polaris are part of the newer industrial area on the north east side of town, with more companies interested in relocating to the area.

On July 1, 2001, the city of Fernley was incorporated. Fernley was one of the worst hit towns in the Great Recession.

On January 5, 2008, a levee along the Truckee Canal broke, forcing the rescue and evacuation of 3,500 people from the town as 3 to 6 feet (0.91 to 1.83 m) of water filled houses. A 2021 lawsuit seeks to block the U.S. Bureau of Reclamation from lining the bottom of the Truckee Canal with concrete, on the grounds that Fernley's municipal water supply depends on seepage from the canal for groundwater recharge.

== Geography ==
Fernley is located at the intersection of Interstate 80, U.S. Route 50 Alternate and U.S. Route 95 Alternate (US 95A). Although it originally spanned the Lyon–Washoe county line, a county boundary change in 2005 left it entirely in Lyon County.

According to the United States Census Bureau, the city has a total area of 128.8 square miles (333.7 km^{2}), of which 122.1 square miles (316.3 km^{2}) is land and 6.7 square miles (17.4 km^{2}), or 5.22%, is water.

=== Climate ===
Fernley's climate is typical of high desert environments. The winter may bring cold temperatures and some snow, but nothing extreme is normally experienced. Summers are generally hot and very dry. Fernley's average annual rainfall is 5 inches (130 mm).

According to the Köppen climate classification, Fernley has a cold desert climate (abbreviated BWk).

Climate data for Fernley, 1991–2020 simulated normals (4170 ft elevation)
Month	Jan	Feb	Mar	Apr	May	Jun	Jul	Aug	Sep	Oct	Nov	Dec	Year
Mean daily maximum °F (°C)	45.9 (7.7)	51.1 (10.6)	58.6 (14.8)	64.8 (18.2)	73.8 (23.2)	84.2 (29.0)	93.6 (34.2)	91.9 (33.3)	83.1 (28.4)	69.4 (20.8)	55.6 (13.1)	45.1 (7.3)	68.1 (20.1)
Daily mean °F (°C)	34.5 (1.4)	38.7 (3.7)	44.8 (7.1)	50.2 (10.1)	58.8 (14.9)	67.8 (19.9)	76.3 (24.6)	74.5 (23.6)	66.0 (18.9)	53.2 (11.8)	41.7 (5.4)	33.6 (0.9)	53.3 (11.9)
Mean daily minimum °F (°C)	23.4 (−4.8)	26.2 (−3.2)	30.9 (−0.6)	35.6 (2.0)	44.1 (6.7)	51.3 (10.7)	59.0 (15.0)	57.0 (13.9)	48.9 (9.4)	37.0 (2.8)	28.0 (−2.2)	22.3 (−5.4)	38.6 (3.7)
Average precipitation inches (mm)	0.86 (21.96)	0.63 (15.92)	0.62 (15.75)	0.39 (9.86)	0.65 (16.42)	0.43 (10.96)	0.29 (7.49)	0.17 (4.31)	0.27 (6.81)	0.38 (9.76)	0.43 (11.00)	0.61 (15.50)	5.73 (145.74)
Average dew point °F (°C)	23.0 (−5.0)	23.4 (−4.8)	24.1 (−4.4)	24.6 (−4.1)	29.5 (−1.4)	32.0 (0.0)	35.8 (2.1)	33.8 (1.0)	30.4 (−0.9)	27.0 (−2.8)	23.7 (−4.6)	22.1 (−5.5)	27.5 (−2.5)
Source: PRISM Climate Group

== Demographics ==
Historical population
Census	Pop.	Note	%±
1990	5,164		—
2000	8,543		65.4%
2010	19,368		126.7%
2020	22,895		18.2%
U.S. Decennial Census

=== 2020 census ===
As of the 2020 census, Fernley had a population of 22,895. The median age was 36.9 years. 25.5% of residents were under the age of 18 and 16.4% were 65 years of age or older. For every 100 females there were 103.3 males, and for every 100 females age 18 and over there were 102.9 males age 18 and over.

79.8% of residents lived in urban areas, while 20.2% lived in rural areas.

There were 8,211 households in Fernley, of which 36.1% had children under the age of 18 living in them. Of all households, 51.8% were married-couple households, 19.6% were households with a male householder and no spouse or partner present, and 18.5% were households with a female householder and no spouse or partner present. About 20.5% of all households were made up of individuals and 9.4% had someone living alone who was 65 years of age or older.

There were 8,651 housing units, of which 5.1% were vacant. The homeowner vacancy rate was 2.3% and the rental vacancy rate was 5.3%.

Racial composition as of the 2020 census
Race	Number	Percent
White	17,050	74.5%
Black or African American	323	1.4%
American Indian and Alaska Native	442	1.9%
Asian	512	2.2%
Native Hawaiian and Other Pacific Islander	121	0.5%
Some other race	1,370	6.0%
Two or more races	3,077	13.4%
Hispanic or Latino (of any race)	4,084	17.8%

=== 2010 census ===
As of the 2010 census, there were 19,368 people, 7,048 households, and 5,206 families residing in the city. The population density was 158.6 inhabitants per square mile (61.2/km^{2}). There were 7,975 housing units at an average density of 65.3 per square mile (25.2/km^{2}). The racial makeup of the city was 84.5% White, 1.0% Black or African American, 1.8% Native American, 6.0% Asian, 0.4% Pacific Islander, 5.7% some other race, and 4.6% from two or more races. Hispanic or Latino of any race were 14.4% of the population.

There were 7,048 households, out of which 38.7% had children under the age of 18 living with them, 56.6% were headed by married couples living together, 10.8% had a female householder with no husband present, and 26.1% were non-families. 19.5% of all households were made up of individuals, and 6.7% were someone living alone who was 65 years of age or older. The average household size was 2.74, and the average family size was 3.13.

In the city, the population was spread out, with 27.7% under the age of 18, 7.0% from 18 to 24, 27.2% from 25 to 44, 26.3% from 45 to 64, and 11.8% who were 65 years of age or older. The median age was 36.3 years. For every 100 females, there were 101.1 males. For every 100 females age 18 and over, there were 100.4 males.

=== 2007–2011 American Community Survey ===
For the period 2007–2011, the estimated median annual income for a household in the city was $52,572, and the median income for a family was $55,188. Male full-time workers had a median income of $51,081 versus $36,720 for females. The per capita income for the city was $22,851. About 6.6% of families and 8.4% of the population were below the poverty line, including 13.2% of those under age 18 and 2.8% of those age 65 or over.

== Education ==
Fernley is home to Fernley High School.

Fernley High has extensive athletic programs, program centers and student clubs. It has a broad array of educational facilities including Fernley Adult Education Center. The school has drawn hundreds of international students since the 1990s.

The school has built a considerable number of sports facilities, including a football stadium, baseball field, track and field, basketball indoor arena, gymnasium, fitness center, etc. It has an extensive student meal program, dining hall and catering facilities.

Fernley High School was founded in the late 1950s. Its original buildings were located on the block now occupied by the In-Town Park, near the old downtown area between US 95A and Center Street; these were demolished in the early 1960s. Then until 1980, the high school was located at the current Fernley Intermediate School on Hardie Lane. Fernley High currently is located off US 95A on the south side of town.

Fernley is also home to Western Nevada College's satellite campus, providing vocational & college-level education.

== Places of interest ==
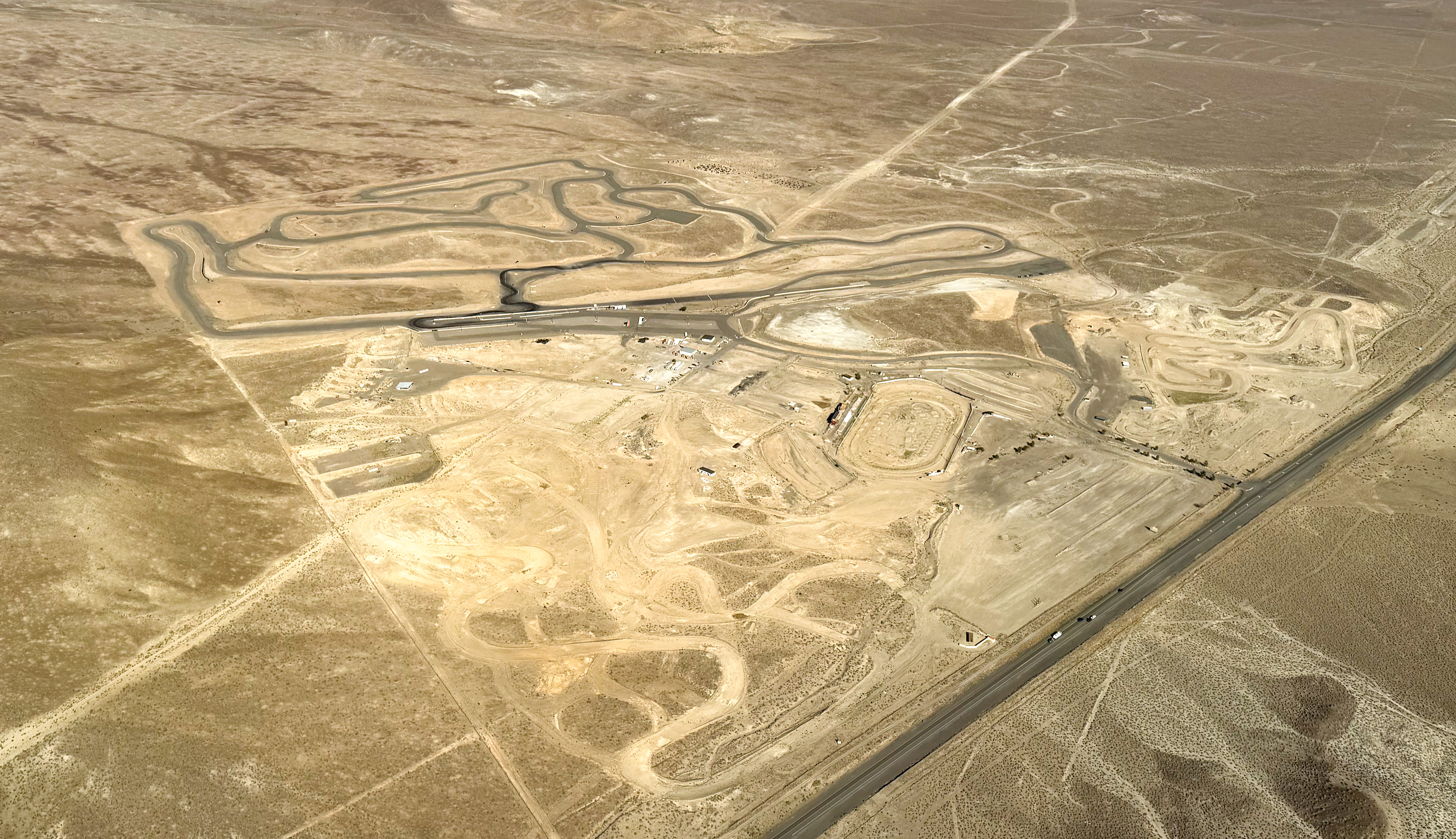
Reno-Fernley Raceway

Since 1990, Fernley has been the home of one of the two Nevada Veterans Memorial Cemeteries, the Northern Nevada Veterans Memorial Cemetery; with the other being the Southern Nevada Veterans Memorial Cemetery located in Boulder City.

== See also ==
- Fernley Hills
