= Mahogany Fire =

2020 wildfire in Nevada, U.S.

- Part of the 2020 Nevada wildfires
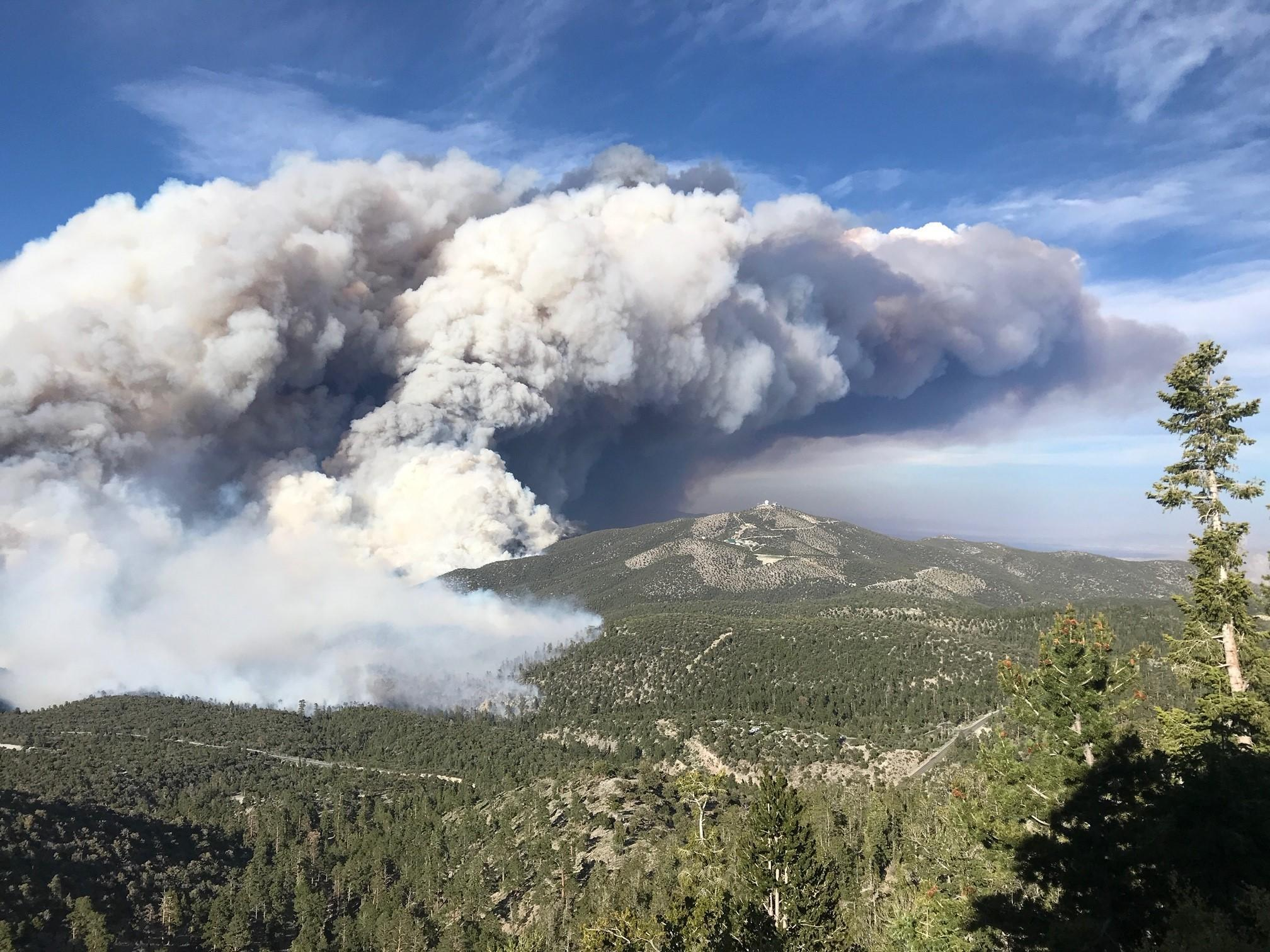
- The Mahogany Fire on June 29, 2020
- Date: June 28, 2020–July 7, 2020
- Location: Spring Mountains National Recreation Area, Nevada, United States
- Coordinates: 36.306°N 115.618°W

Statistics
- Burned area: 2,758 acres (1,116 ha)

Ignition
- Cause: Under investigation (human caused)

Map
- Location in Nevada

The Mahogany Fire was a wildfire that burned on Mount Charleston in the Spring Mountains National Recreation Area, approximately 50 miles (80 km) northwest of Las Vegas, Nevada in the United States. The fire was first reported on June 28, 2020. The fire burned a total of 2,758 acres (1,116 ha) and was contained on July 7, 2020. The cause of the fire remains under investigation. The fire impacted recreational activities and roadways in the area, including closing a children's summer camp and evacuating Lee Canyon. Additionally, three state highways were closed in the area to allow ease of access for crews and to limit the public's access to the fire area.

== Events ==
The Mahogany Fire was first reported on June 28, 2020, around 2:30 pm near the Mahogany Grove Campground on Mount Charleston in the Spring Mountains National Recreation Area, approximately 50 miles (80 km) northeast of Las Vegas, Nevada. Upon immediate investigation, incident crews reported it as being 15 acres (6 ha). The fire grew quickly, fueled by pinyon-juniper and brush, moving eastward and growing to an estimated 5,000 acres (2,000 ha). Spring Mountain Youth Camp was evacuated and by 7:15 pm mandatory evacuations were put in place for Lee Canyon. S.R. 156, S.R. 157 and S.R. 158 were closed. Despite strong winds gusting to 50 miles per hour (80 km/h), temperatures had decreased to 41 °F (5 °C) overnight and fire conditions supportive to suppression efforts. The acreage estimate for the fire was lowered from 5,000 acres (2,000 ha) to 2,794 acres (1,131 ha). An evacuation center was established by the American Red Cross at James H. Bilbray Elementary School in Las Vegas, however it closed by the afternoon of June 29. Power lines on Mount Charleston were de-energized by NV Energy, impacting 450 customers. An air quality alert was issued for the Las Vegas Valley.

Air support was brought in to fight the fire the next day, June 29. Updated mapping led to the actual acreage to be 3,040 acres (1,230 ha). Due to the rapid growth of the fire, fire crews asked the public to avoid Lee Canyon and Kyle Canyon. While the cause of the fire remains under investigation, the United States Forest Service shared that it was likely human caused. Mapping was once more updated and as of the morning of June 30, 2020, the footprint of the Mahogany Fire was lowered to 2,794 acres (1,131 ha). Highway 156 and 157 were re-opened.

=== July ===
On July 2, Highway 156 was closed at the intersection of Highway 158 to allow crews to cut hazardous trees and helicopters to work in the area. Helicopters sourced water from the Lee Canyon resort. Crews continued clean up work, including mopping up hot spots and completing handlines. Starting the week of July 6, Spring Mountain Youth Camp was reopened. Highway 156 beyond the Highway 158 interchange reopened on July 7. The fire was contained on July 7. It burned a total of 2,758 acres (1,116 ha).

== Impact ==
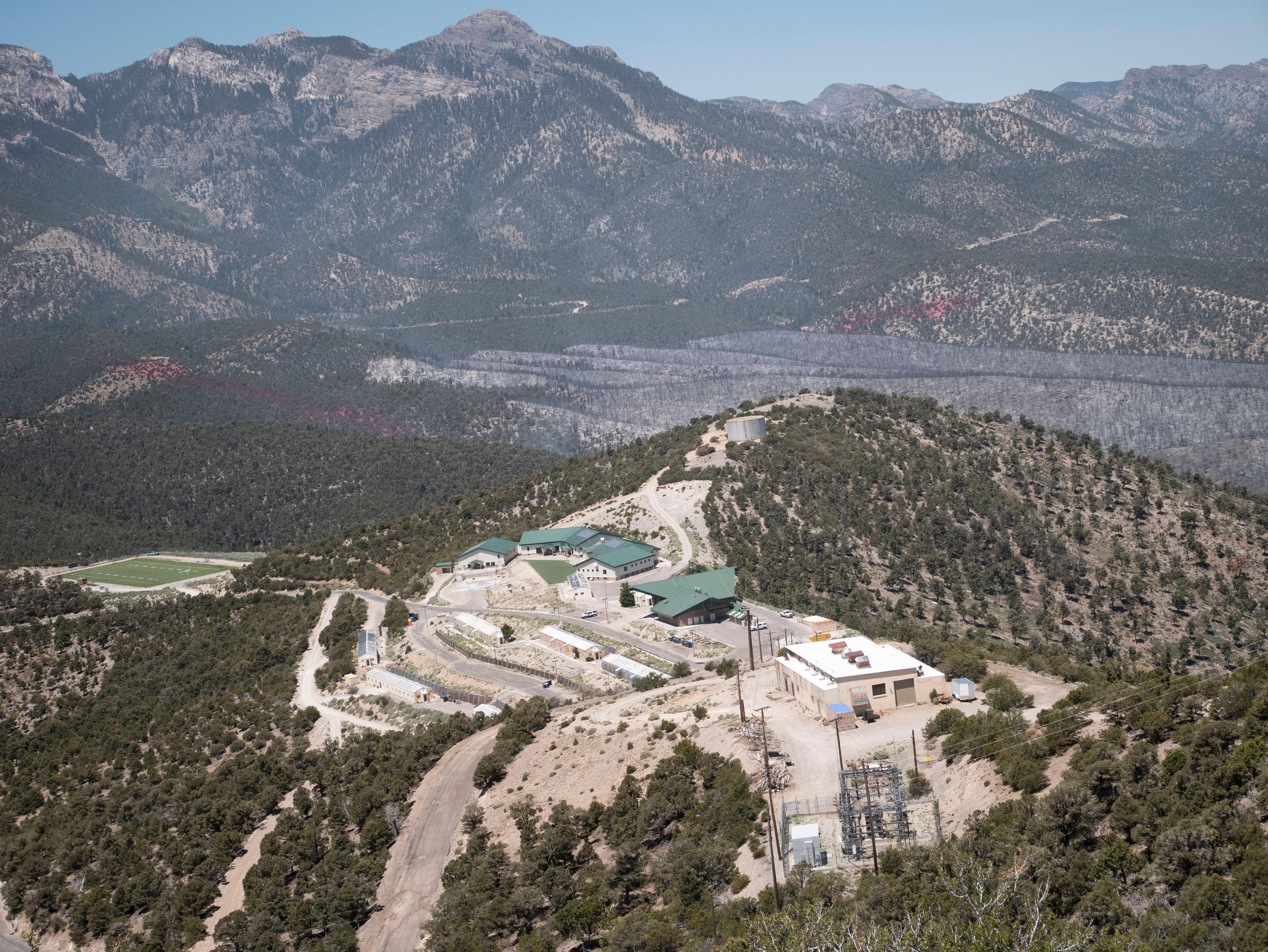
The Spring Mountain Youth Camp was evacuated and protected from the Mahogany Fire.

The Mahogany Fire impacted recreational activities in the Spring Mountains National Recreation Area. Spring Mountain Youth Camp was the first site evacuated, reopening for re-population on July 6. The fire caused the evacuation of Lee Canyon, a ski resort. People were allowed to return to Lee Canyon in the evening. However, fire officials asked members of the public to avoid Lee Canyon and Kyle Canyon during the duration of the fire.

Highway 156, Highway 157 and Highway 158, were closed on June 29. Highway 156 & 157 re-opened the following day. However, Highway 156 was closed again to allow crews to safely work in the area, reopening July 7. Power was turned off for 450 residents in the area from June 28 through June 29.

Air quality was negatively affected in the Las Vegas Valley.

== Investigation ==
While the cause of the Mahogany Fire remains under investigation, the fire was human caused.

== Gallery ==
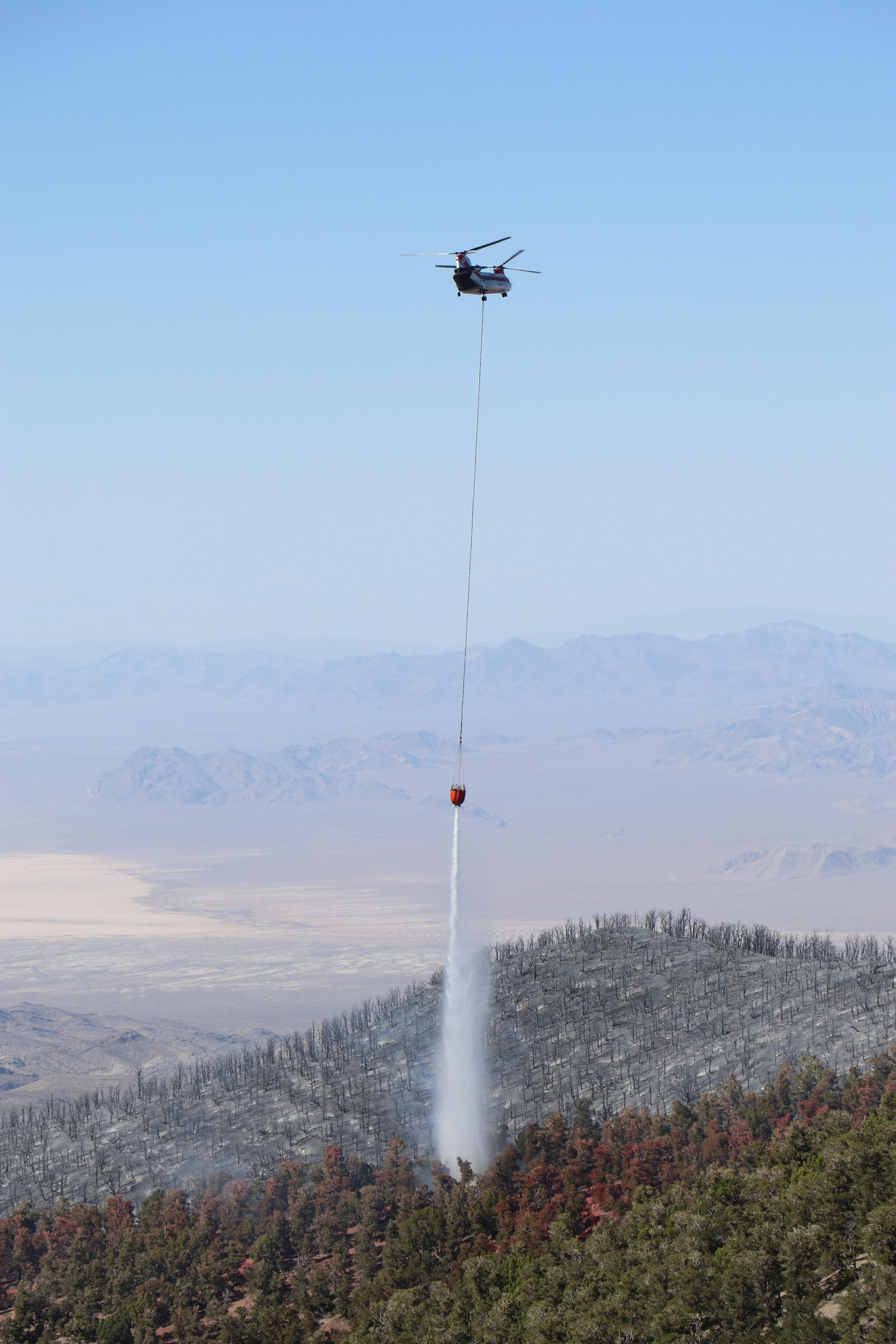
Helicopter dropping water near Angel Peak on July 1

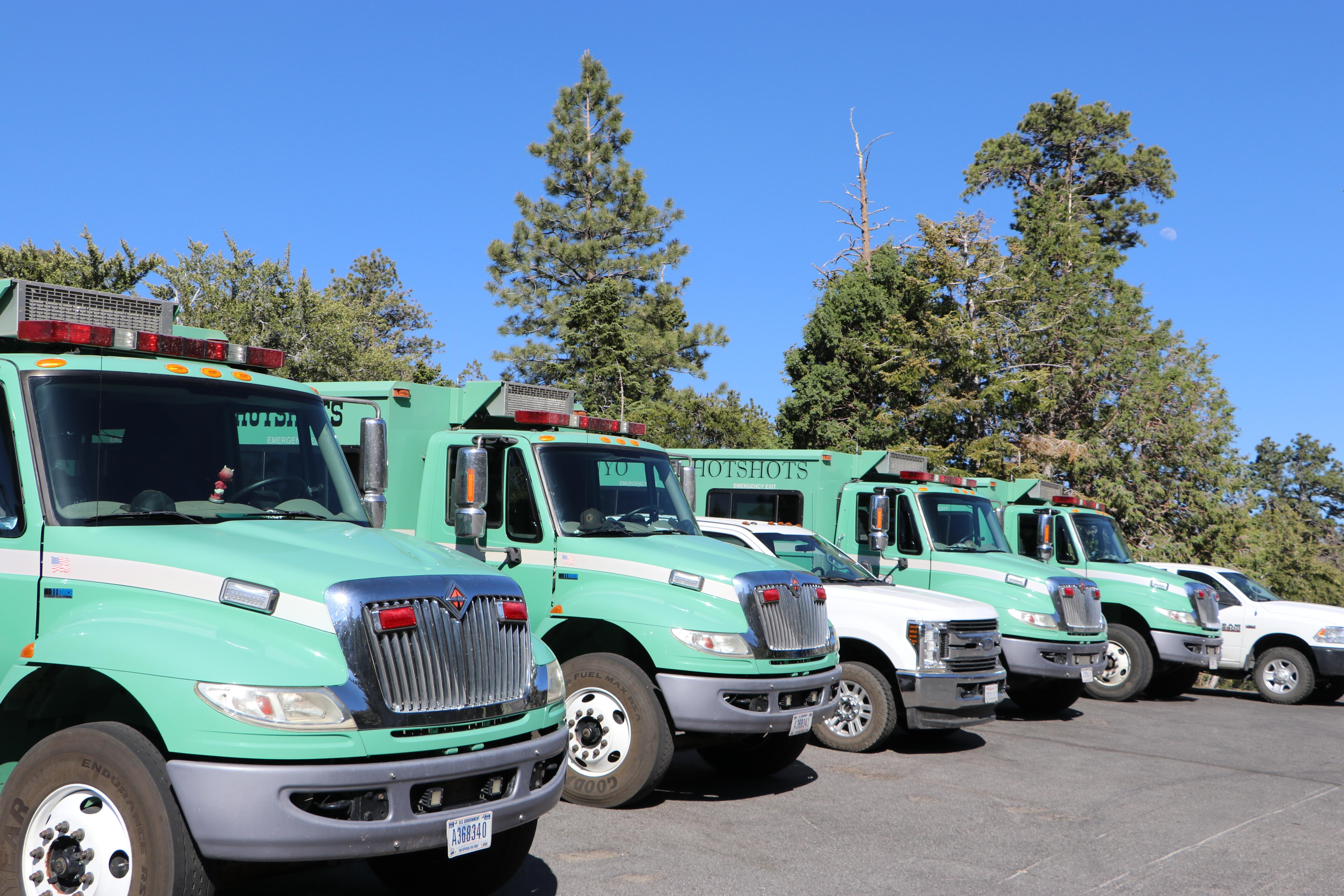
Hot shot trucks on July 1

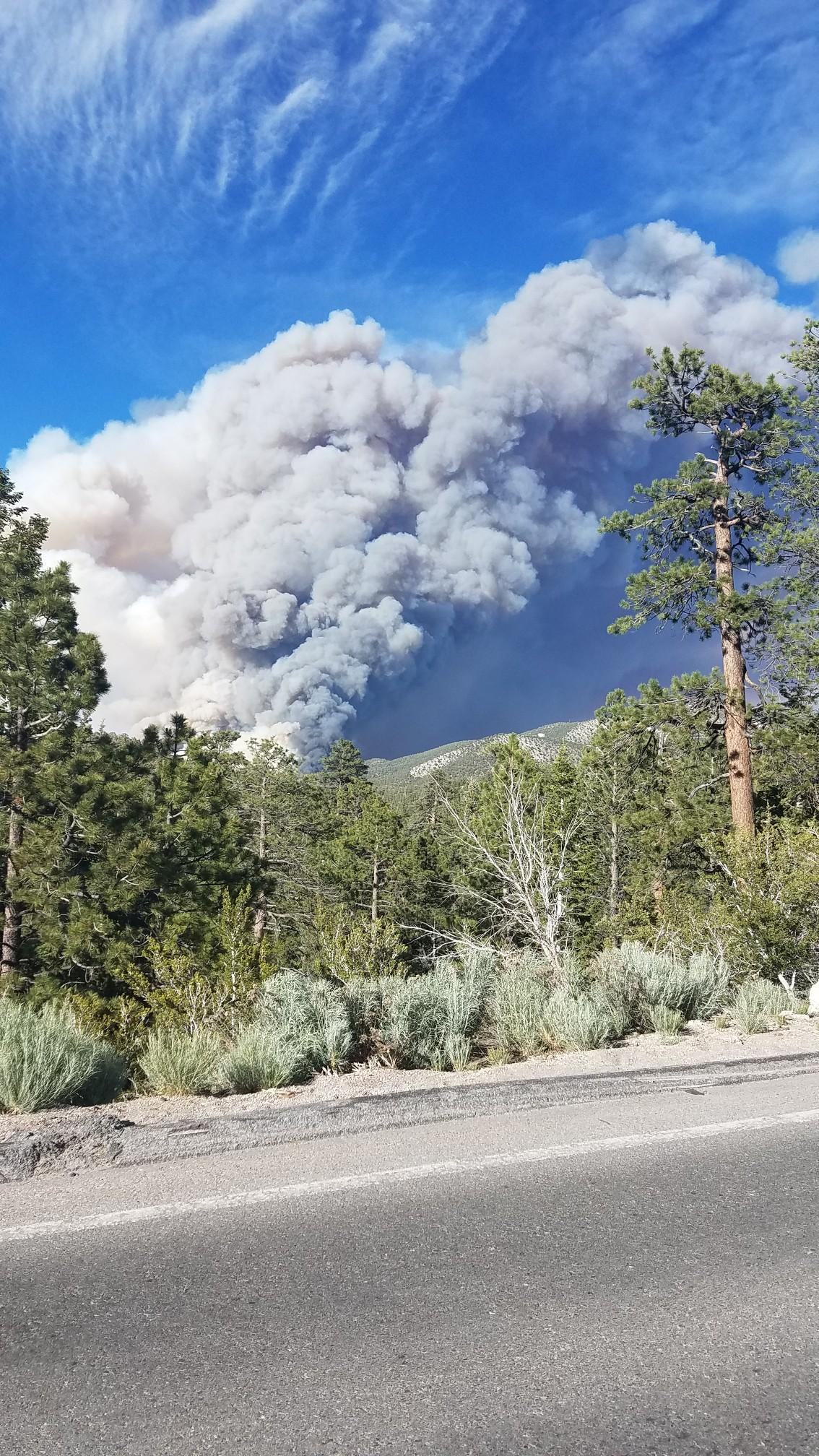
Fire on June 29

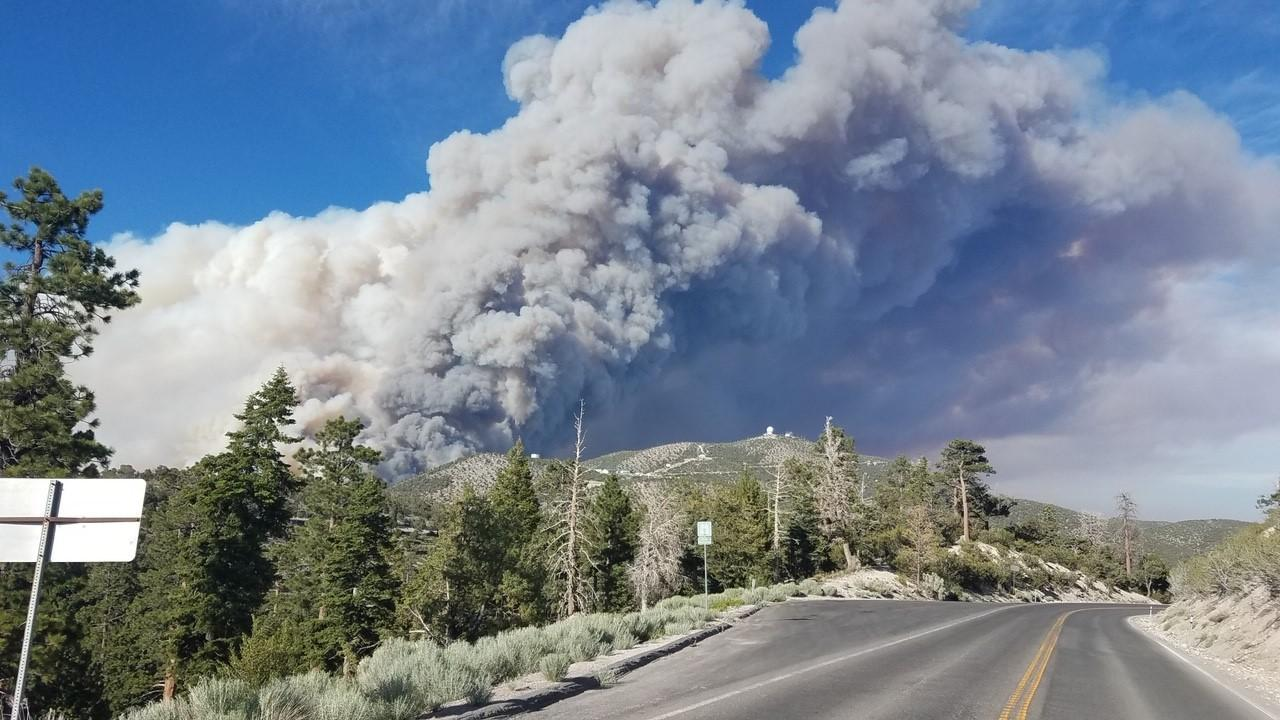
Fire on June 28

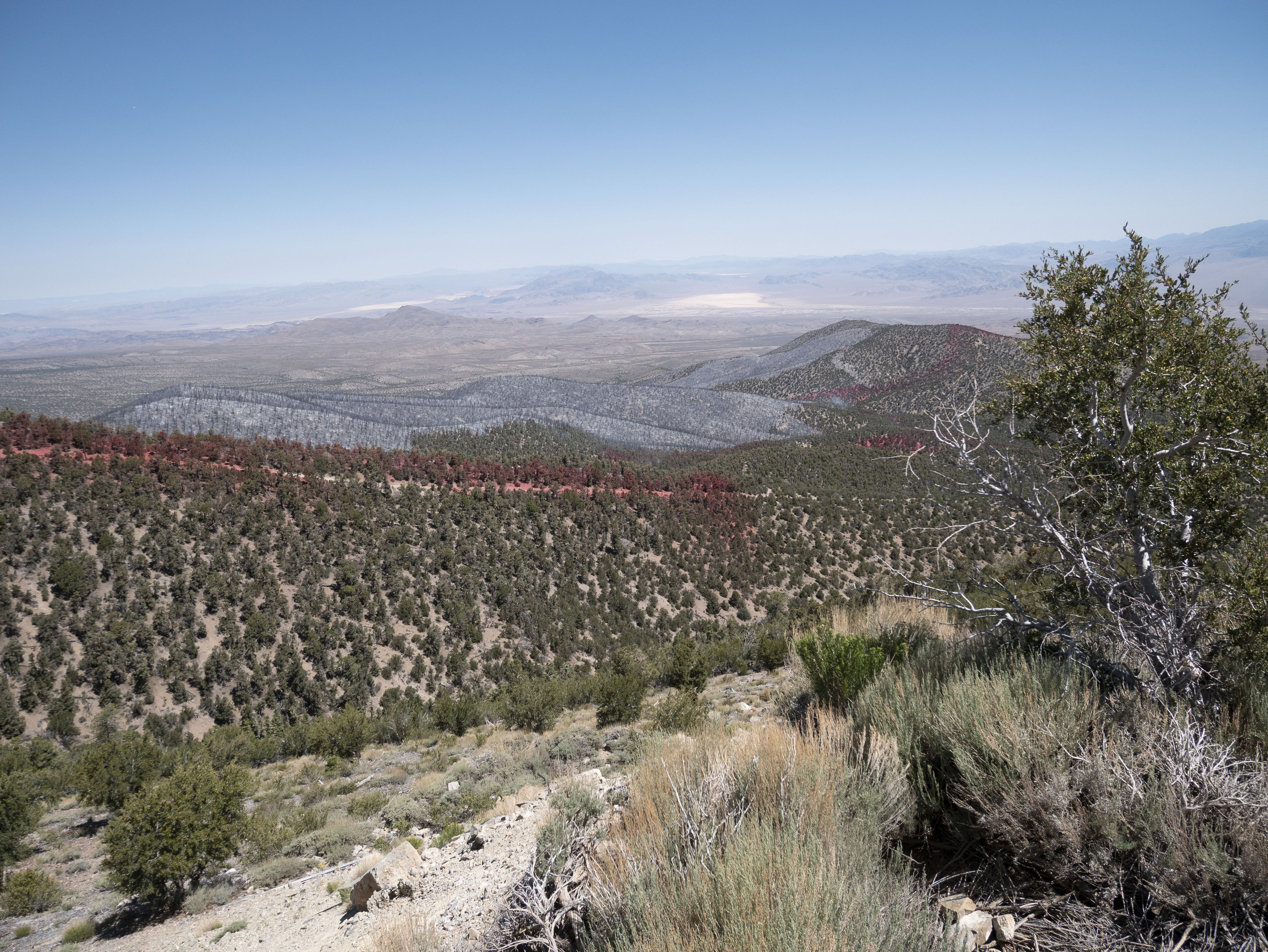
Fire retardant lines protecting power lines near Angel Mountain on July 1

== See also ==
- 2020 Nevada wildfires
