= List of highways numbered 157 =

The following highways are numbered 157:

== Canada ==
- Prince Edward Island Route 157 (DeBlois Road)
- Quebec Route 157

== Costa Rica ==
- National Route 157

== Japan ==
- Japan National Route 157

== United Kingdom ==
- A157 road
- B157 road

== United States ==
- Alabama State Route 157
- Arkansas Highway 157
- California State Route 157 (former)
- Colorado State Highway 157
- Connecticut Route 157
- Florida State Road 157
- Georgia State Route 157
- Illinois Route 157
- Indiana State Road 157
- K-157 (Kansas highway)
- Kentucky Route 157
- Louisiana Highway 157
- Maine State Route 157
- Maryland Route 157
- M-157 (Michigan highway)
- Missouri Route 157
- Nevada State Route 157
- New Jersey Route 157
- New Mexico State Road 157
- New York State Route 157
  - New York State Route 157A
- North Carolina Highway 157
- Pennsylvania Route 157
- South Carolina Highway 157
- Tennessee State Route 157
- Texas State Highway 157 (former)
  - Texas State Highway Loop 157
- Utah State Route 157
- Virginia State Route 157
- Wisconsin Highway 157
- Wyoming Highway 157

Territories

- Puerto Rico Highway 157

Preceded by 156	Lists of highways 157	Succeeded by 158
