= List of highways numbered 158 =

The following highways are numbered 158:

== Argentina ==
- National Route 158

== Brazil ==
- BR-158

== Canada ==
- Prince Edward Island Route 158 (Harper Road)
- Quebec Route 158

== Costa Rica ==
- National Route 158

== Japan ==
- Japan National Route 158

== United Kingdom ==
- A158 road
- B158 road

== United States ==
- U.S. Route 158
- Alabama State Route 158
- Arkansas Highway 158
- California State Route 158
- Florida State Road 158 (former)
- Georgia State Route 158 (former)
- Georgia State Route 158
- Illinois Route 158
- Indiana State Road 158
- Kentucky Route 158
- Louisiana Highway 158
- Maine State Route 158
- Maryland Route 158
- M-158 (Michigan highway) (former)
- Missouri Route 158
- Nevada State Route 158
- New Jersey Route 158 (former)
- New Mexico State Road 158
- New York State Route 158
- Ohio State Route 158
- Pennsylvania Route 158
- South Dakota Highway 158
- Tennessee State Route 158
- Texas State Highway 158
  - Texas State Highway Spur 158
- Utah State Route 158
- Virginia State Route 158
- Wisconsin Highway 158
- Wyoming Highway 158

Territories

- Puerto Rico Highway 158 (unbuilt)

Preceded by 157	Lists of highways 158	Succeeded by 159
