= List of highways numbered 155 =

Route 155 or Highway 155 may refer to:

== Canada ==
- Prince Edward Island Route 155 (Thompson Road)
- Quebec Route 155
- Saskatchewan Highway 155
- Winnipeg Route 155

== Costa Rica ==
- National Route 155

== Japan ==
- Japan National Route 155

== United Kingdom ==
- A155 road
- B155 road

== United States ==
- Interstate 155
- U.S. Route 155 (former proposal)
- Alabama State Route 155
- Arkansas Highway 155
- California State Route 155
- Connecticut Route 155
- Florida State Road 155
- Georgia State Route 155
- Illinois Route 155
- Kentucky Route 155
- Louisiana Highway 155
- Maine State Route 155
- Maryland Route 155
- M-155 (Michigan highway)
- New Hampshire Route 155
  - New Hampshire Route 155A
- New Jersey Route 155 (former)
- New York State Route 155
- Ohio State Route 155
- Pennsylvania Route 155
- Tennessee State Route 155
- Texas State Highway 155
  - Texas State Highway Loop 155
  - Farm to Market Road 155 (Texas)
- Utah State Route 155
- Vermont Route 155
- Virginia State Route 155
- Washington State Route 155
- Wisconsin Highway 155

Territories

- Puerto Rico Highway 155

Preceded by 154	Lists of highways 155	Succeeded by 156
