= List of highways numbered 156 =

The following highways are numbered 156:

== Brazil ==
- BR-156

== Canada ==
- Prince Edward Island Route 156 (Palmer Road)

== Costa Rica ==
- National Route 156

== India ==
- National Highway 156 (India)

== Japan ==
- Japan National Route 156

== United Kingdom ==
- A156 road
- B156 road

== United States ==
- U.S. Route 156 (former)
- Alabama State Route 156
- Arkansas Highway 156
- California State Route 156
- Connecticut Route 156
- Georgia State Route 156
- Illinois Route 156
- Indiana State Road 156
- Iowa Highway 156 (former)
- K-156 (Kansas highway)
- Kentucky Route 156
- Louisiana Highway 156
- Maine State Route 156
- Maryland Route 156
- M-156 (Michigan highway)
- Minnesota State Highway 156
- Missouri Route 156
- Nevada State Route 156
- New Hampshire Route 156
- New Jersey Route 156
- New Mexico State Road 156
- New York State Route 156
- Ohio State Route 156 (former)
- Oklahoma State Highway 156
- Pennsylvania Route 156
- Tennessee State Route 156
- Texas State Highway 156
  - Texas State Highway Spur 156
- Utah State Route 156
- Virginia State Route 156
- Wisconsin Highway 156
- Wyoming Highway 156

Territories

- Puerto Rico Highway 156

Preceded by 155	Lists of highways 156	Succeeded by 157
