= K152 =

K152 or K-152 may refer to:

- K-152 (Kansas highway), a Kansas highway numbered 152
- HMCS Sherbrooke (K152), a 1940 Canadian Navy Flower-class corvette
- Russian submarine K-152 Nerpa, a 2008 Project 971 Shchuka-B type nuclear-powered attack submarine
