= List of highways numbered 160 =

The following highways are numbered 160:

== Australia ==
- Glenelg Highway

== Canada ==
- New Brunswick Route 160
- Prince Edward Island Route 160 (Ascension Road)

== Costa Rica ==
- National Route 160

== India ==
- National Highway 160 (India)

== Japan ==
- Japan National Route 160

== United Kingdom ==
- A160 road
- B160 road

== United States ==
- U.S. Route 160
- Alabama State Route 160
- Arizona State Route 160 (former)
- Arkansas Highway 160
- California State Route 160
- Connecticut Route 160
- Georgia State Route 160 (former)
- Hawaii Route 160
- Illinois Route 160
- Indiana State Road 160
- Iowa Highway 160
- Kentucky Route 160
- Louisiana Highway 160
- Maine State Route 160
- M-160 (Michigan highway) (former)
- Nevada State Route 160
- New Jersey Route 160 (former)
- New York State Route 160
- North Carolina Highway 160
- Ohio State Route 160
- Pennsylvania Route 160
- South Carolina Highway 160
- Tennessee State Route 160
- Texas State Highway 160
  - Texas State Highway Loop 160
  - Farm to Market Road 160
- Utah State Route 160
- Virginia State Route 160
- Washington State Route 160
- Wisconsin Highway 160
- Wyoming Highway 160

Territories

- Puerto Rico Highway 160

Preceded by 159	Lists of highways 160	Succeeded by 161
