= List of highways numbered 153 =

The following highways are numbered 153:

== Brazil ==
- BR-153

== Canada ==
- Prince Edward Island Route 153 (Greenmount Road)
- Quebec Route 153

== Costa Rica ==
- National Route 153

== India ==
- National Highway 153 (India)

== Japan ==
- Japan National Route 153

== Korea, South ==
- Pyeongtaek–Siheung Expressway

== United Kingdom ==
- A153 road
- B153 road

== United States ==
- Alabama State Route 153
- Arizona State Route 153 (former)
- Arkansas Highway 153
- California State Route 153
- Connecticut Route 153
- Georgia State Route 153
- Illinois Route 153
- K-153 (Kansas highway)
- Kentucky Route 153
- Louisiana Highway 153
- Maine State Route 153
- M-153 (Michigan highway)
- Missouri Route 153
- Nevada State Route 153 (former)
- New Hampshire Route 153
- New Jersey Route 153 (former)
- New Mexico State Road 153
- New York State Route 153
- North Carolina Highway 153
- Ohio State Route 153
- Oklahoma State Highway 153
- Oregon Route 153
- Pennsylvania Route 153
- South Carolina Highway 153
- South Dakota Highway 153
- Tennessee State Route 153
- Texas State Highway 153
- Utah State Route 153
- Vermont Route 153
- Virginia State Route 153
- Washington State Route 153
- Wisconsin Highway 153
- Wyoming Highway 153

Territories

- Puerto Rico Highway 153

Preceded by 152	Lists of highways 153	Succeeded by 154
