= Lee Canyon =

Canyon in Clark County, Nevada, US

Coordinates: 36°24′00″N 115°34′03″W

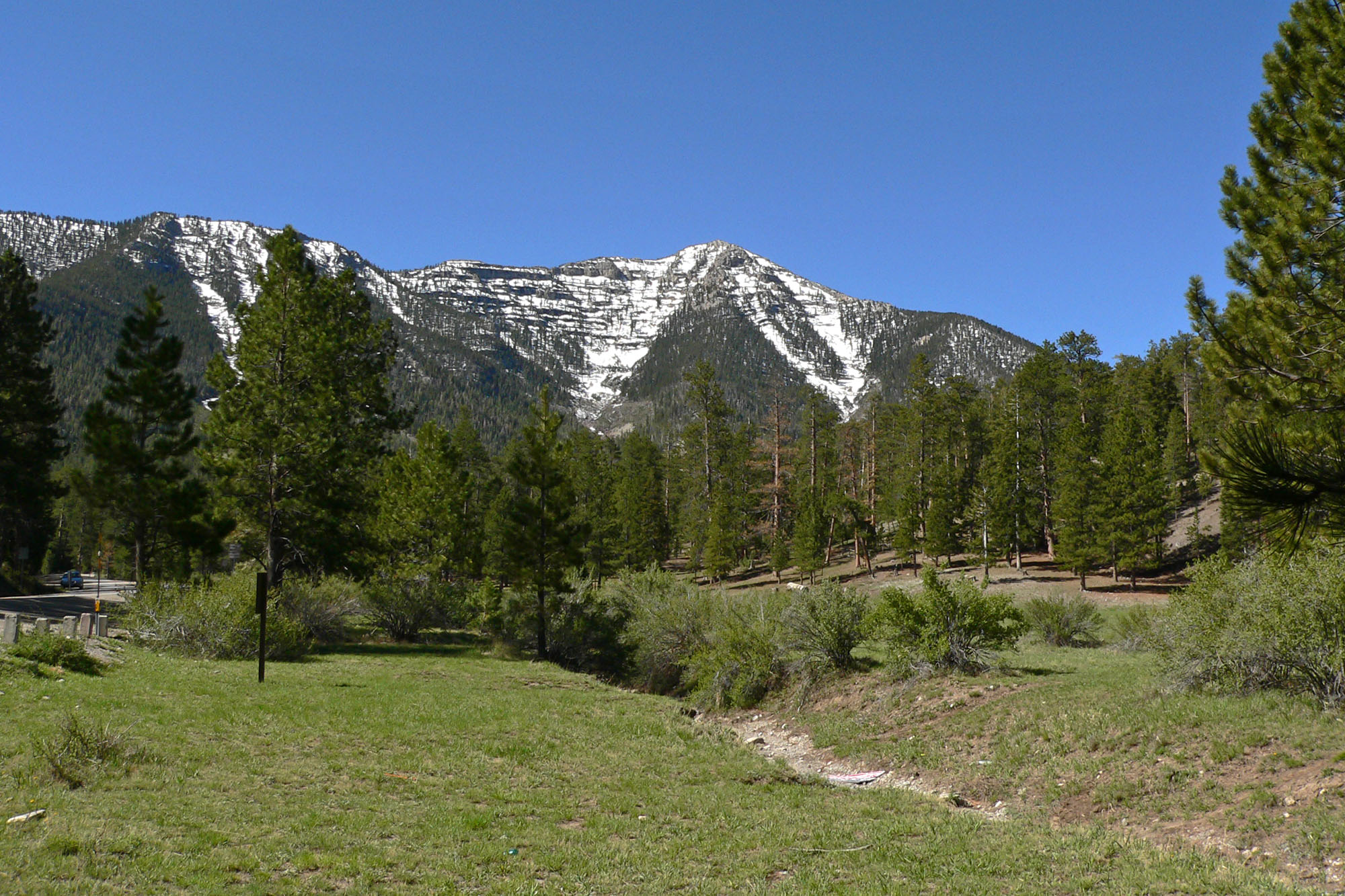
Lee Peak, seen from meadow in Lee Canyon

Lee Canyon is a canyon containing a small community and recreational area in the Spring Mountains located in Clark County, Nevada, United States. Primary access is via Lee Canyon Road. Access to the adjacent Kyle Canyon and Mount Charleston, Nevada, is via SR 158. It is 17 acres and is located at latitude: 36-18'31"N Longitude: 115-40'37"W. It is 8,510 ft above sea level.

== Services ==
- The Las Vegas Ski and Snowboard Resort is located at the top of Lee Canyon.
- Camp Lee Canyon
- Lee Canyon Fire Station staffed by the Nevada Division of Forestry with a single Type 3 Brush Engine.
- Bristlecone Trail Loop
- McWilliams Campground
- Dolomite Campground
- Old Mill Campground
