= List of highways numbered 159 =

The following highways are numbered 159:

== Canada ==
- Prince Edward Island Route 159 (Peter Road)
- Quebec Route 159

== Costa Rica ==
- National Route 159

== Japan ==
- Japan National Route 159

== United Kingdom ==
- A159 road
- B159 road

== United States ==
- U.S. Route 159
- Alabama State Route 159
- Arkansas Highway 159
- California State Route 159 (former)
- Colorado State Highway 159
- Connecticut Route 159
- Florida State Road 159
- Georgia State Route 159
- Illinois Route 159
- Indiana State Road 159
- Kentucky Route 159
- Louisiana Highway 159
- Maine State Route 159
- Maryland Route 159
- Massachusetts Route 159
- Nevada State Route 159
- New Jersey Route 159
- New Mexico State Road 159
- New York State Route 159
- North Carolina Highway 159
- Ohio State Route 159
- Pennsylvania Route 159 (former)
- Tennessee State Route 159
- Texas State Highway 159
  - Texas State Highway Spur 159
- Utah State Route 159
- Virginia State Route 159
- Wisconsin Highway 159
- Wyoming Highway 159

Territories

- Puerto Rico Highway 159

Preceded by 158	Lists of highways 159	Succeeded by 160
