= Lee Canyon (ski resort) =

Ski area in Nevada, United States

Las Vegas Ski and Snowboard Resort

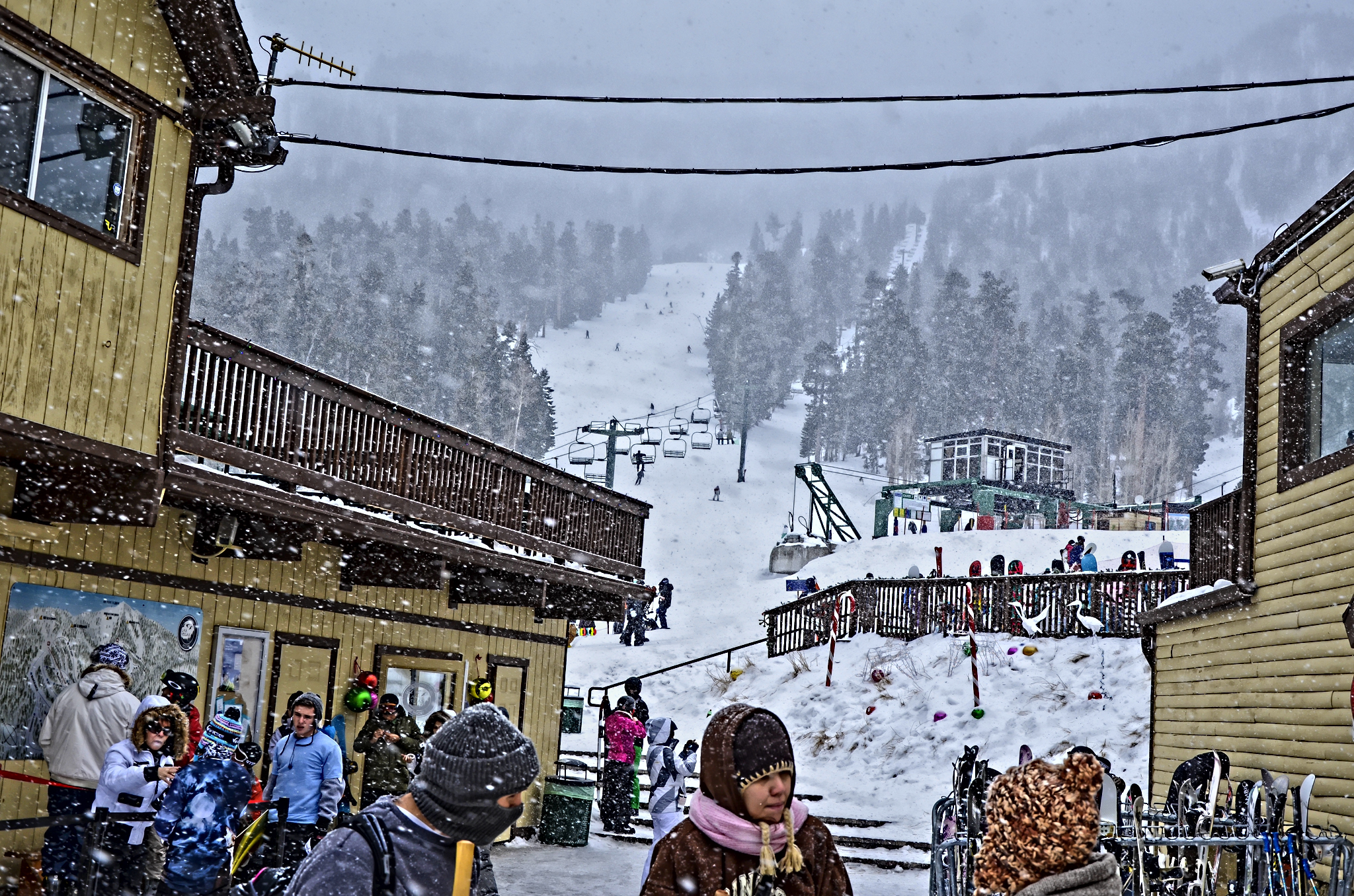
- Snowfall at the base of the area.

- Location in Nevada Las Vegas Ski and Snowboard Resort (the United States)
- Location: Clark County, Nevada
- Coordinates: 36.301638°N 115.680759°W
- Top elevation: 11,289 ft (3,441 m)
- Base elevation: 8,510 ft (2,590 m)
- Skiable area: 385 acres (156 ha)
- Trails: 24; 15% easiest 45% more difficult 40% most difficult
- Longest run: 3,000 ft (910 m)
- Lift system: 4 chairlifts 1 surface lift
- Terrain parks: 1
- Snowfall: 161 in (4,100 mm) Annual
- Snowmaking: 70 acres (28 ha)
- Night skiing: none

The Lee Canyon Ski and Snowboard Resort is located in Lee Canyon, 35 miles (56 km) northwest of Las Vegas, Nevada, United States in the Humboldt-Toiyabe National Forest and Spring Mountains National Recreation Area. The base lodge is situated at the base of Lee Peak (11,289 feet or 3,441 metres), to the north of Mount Charleston (11,916 feet or 3,632 metres), the eighth-highest peak in Nevada. The resort can be reached via US 95 to Nevada State Route 156.

== Ski-area information ==
The resort is owned and operated by Mountain Capital Partners in partnership with the United States Forest Service under a special-use permit.

The area's total of 385 skiable acres (0.6 sq mi; 1.6 km^{2}) offers 11 alpine skiing and snowboarding trails.

== History ==
People have been using the north-facing slopes of the area for winter recreation since the early 1930s. In the 1940s, the Las Vegas Ski Club operated a short rope tow and a warming hut.

Lee Canyon Ski Area was created in 1964, when the Forest Service issued a Special Use Permit in order to provide winter recreation options in Southern Nevada. In 1968 the first chairlift was installed. The main lodge building was completed in February, 1970.

In November 2003, POWDR bought Las Vegas Ski and Snowboard Resort.

On October 7, 2009, Lee Canyon was the second resort in the United States to open for the 2009-2010 season. It was the longest season on record at Lee Canyon, at over 180 days.

On April 13, 2023, an announcement was made stating that Lee Canyon Ski Area was sold to Mountain Capital Partners.
