= List of highways numbered 154 =

The following highways are numbered 154:

== Brazil ==
- BR-154

== Canada ==
- Prince Edward Island Route 154 (Pridham Road)

== Costa Rica ==
- National Route 154

== India ==
- National Highway 154 (India)

== Japan ==
- Japan National Route 154

== United Kingdom ==
- A154 road
- B154 road

== United States ==
- U.S. Route 154 (former)
- Alabama State Route 154
- Arkansas Highway 154
- California State Route 154
- Connecticut Route 154
- Georgia State Route 154 (former)
- Georgia State Route 154
- Illinois Route 154
- Indiana State Road 154
- K-154 (Kansas highway)
- Kentucky Route 154
- Louisiana Highway 154
- Maine State Route 154
- M-154 (Michigan highway)
- Missouri Route 154
- New Jersey Route 154
- New Mexico State Road 154
- New York State Route 154 (former)
- Ohio State Route 154
- Oregon Route 154
- Pennsylvania Route 154
- South Carolina Highway 154
- Tennessee State Route 154
- Texas State Highway 154
- Utah State Route 154
- Virginia State Route 154
- Wisconsin Highway 154
- Wyoming Highway 154

Territories

- Puerto Rico Highway 154

Preceded by 153	Lists of highways 154	Succeeded by 155
