= Nevada State Route 157 =

Highway in Nevada

State Route 157
- Kyle Canyon Road
- SR 157 highlighted in red

Route information
- Maintained by NDOT
- Length: 21.562 mi (34.701 km)
- Existed: July 1, 1976–present

Major junctions
- West end: Charleston Recreational Area in Mount Charleston
- SR 158 in Mount Charleston
- East end: I-11 / US 95 / Sunstone Parkway in Las Vegas

Location
- Country: United States
- State: Nevada
- County: Clark

Highway system
- Nevada State Highway System; Interstate; US; State; Pre‑1976; Scenic
← SR 156	→ SR 158

State Route 157 (SR 157), also known as Kyle Canyon Road, is a U.S. state highway in Clark County, Nevada. The highway connects the Las Vegas area to the recreational areas of Mount Charleston in the Spring Mountains.

Located in the Humboldt-Toiyabe National Forest, a portion of SR 157 has been designated a Nevada Scenic Byway. The route was originally State Route 39 and has origins dating back to the 1930s.

== Route description ==
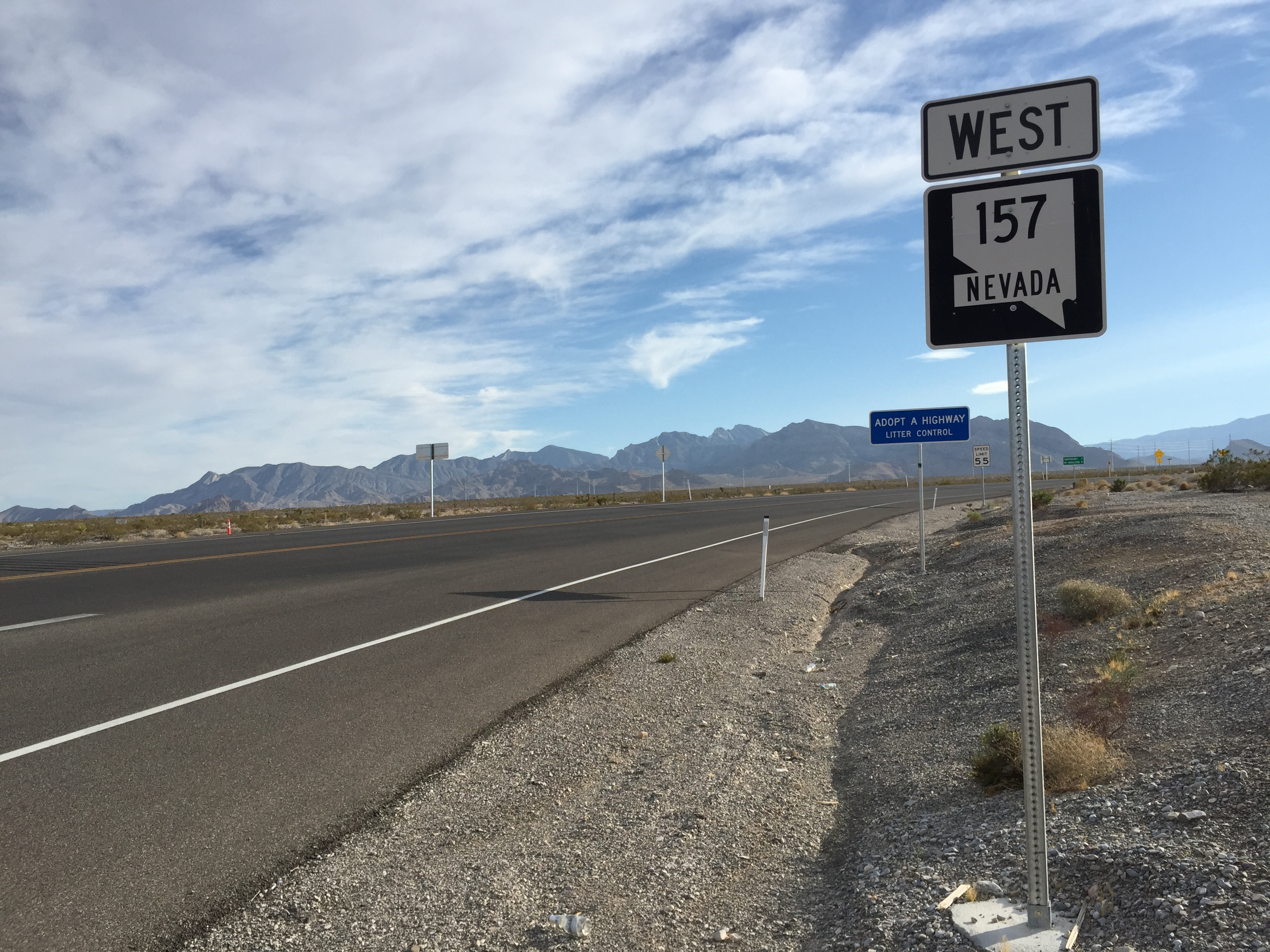
View from the east end of SR 157 looking westbound in 2015

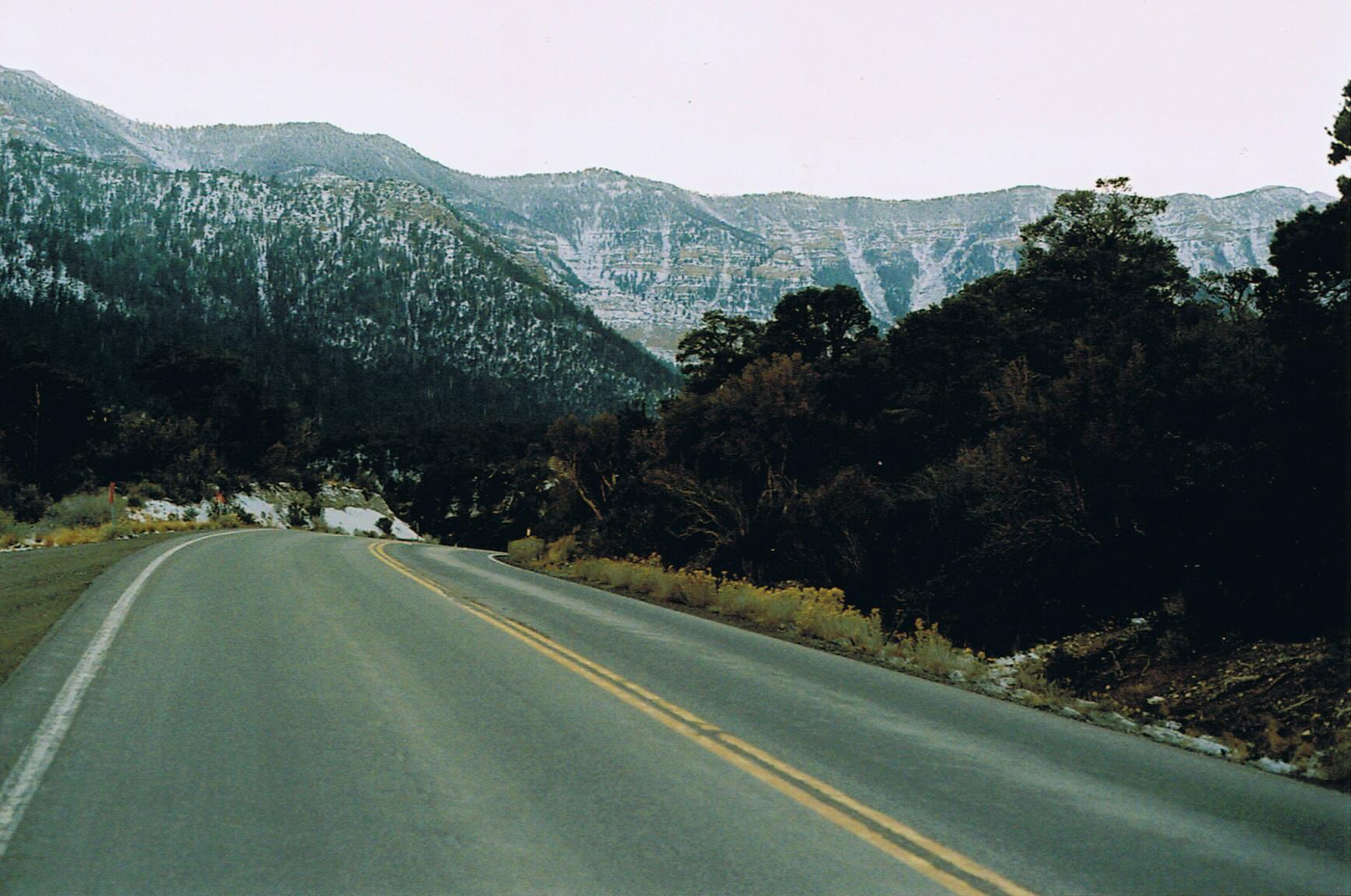
SR 157 in the Spring Mountains in 2007

The highway begins at a dead end near Mount Charleston before descending downwards to the village of Mount Charleston. SR 157 then heads east, rapidly losing elevation. Within a span of 20 miles (32 km), an elevation of 3,000 feet (910 m) is lost with a noticeable difference: temperatures increase, trees and shrubs become less green and numerous, and lasting snow cover during winter months is no longer present. Part of the route is designated as a Nevada Scenic Byway. SR 157 then meets Interstate 11 (I-11)/U.S. Route 95 (US 95) at a diverging diamond interchange before ending at Sunstone Parkway in northwest Las Vegas.

== History ==
SR 157 was originally State Route 39

Kyle Canyon Road has existed since at least 1933, having been established as a county road connecting Charleston Peak (in what was then Dixie National Forest) to State Route 5 (now US 95) at Tule to the east. By 1935, the entire 21 miles (34 km) of the highway had been paved and designated as State Route 39 by the state.

SR 39 appears to have remained unchanged for several years after being included in the state highway system. Its first major change occurred on July 1, 1976, when the route was renumbered to State Route 157 in the mass renumbering of Nevada's state highways. This change was first reflected on official state maps in 1978.

In July 1998, the Nevada Department of Transportation designated SR 157 as a Nevada Scenic Byway. The scenic route encompasses the westernmost 13 miles (21 km) of the highway within the national forest area.

On June 20, 2019, NDOT celebrated the completion of the diverging diamond interchange at the SR 157 junction with US 95, which later opened on June 24, 2019. The interchange was a component of a $78 million project which improved a 6-mile (9.7 km) stretch of US 95 in northwest Las Vegas between Ann Road and SR 157, and replaced what was previously an at-grade intersection. The interchange serves as the current northern terminus of Interstate 11.

== Major intersections ==
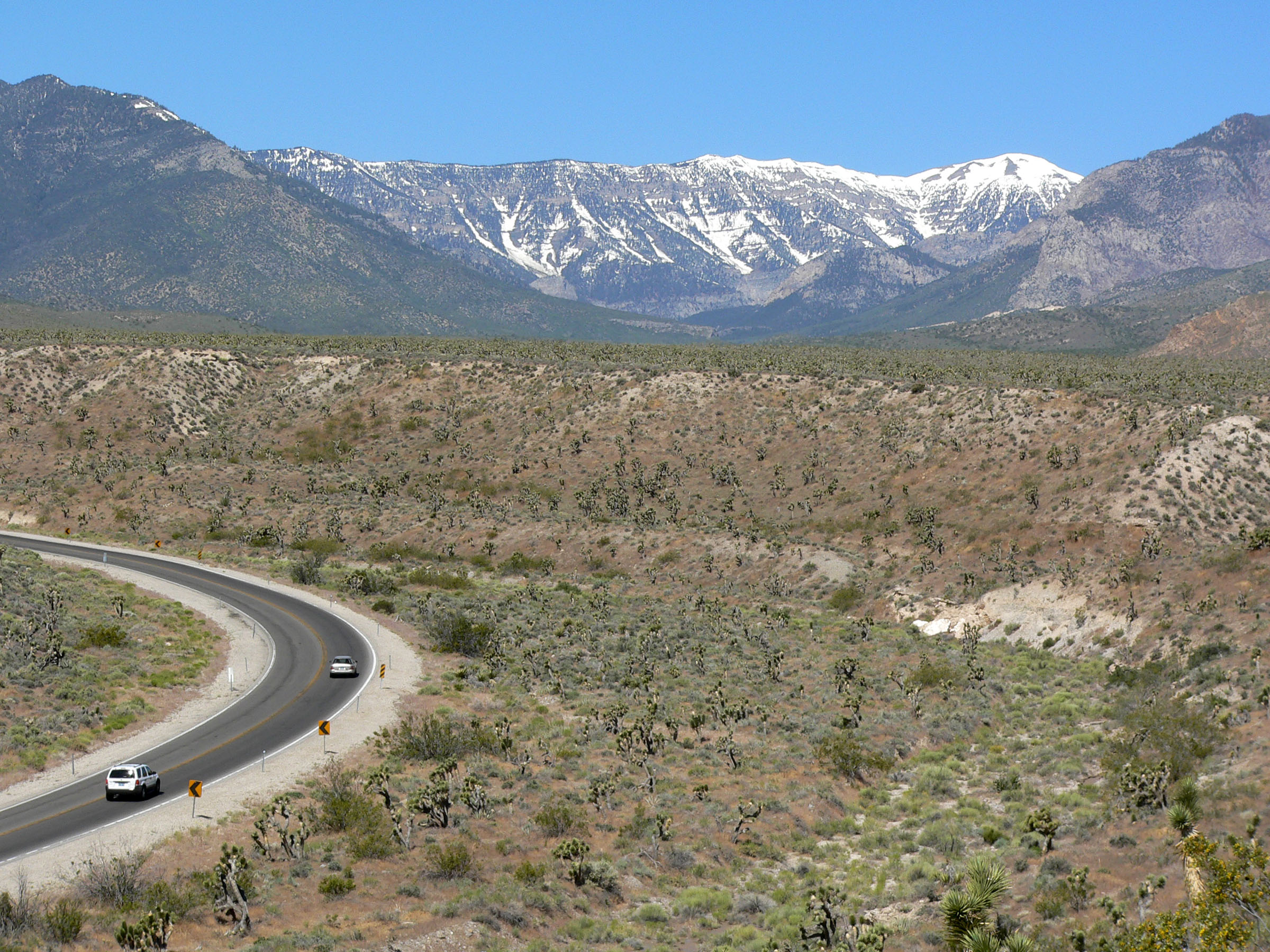
View of Kyle Canyon with SR 157 in the foreground in 2005

The entire route is in Clark County.

Location	mi	km	Destinations	Notes
Mount Charleston	0.000	0.000	Charleston Recreational Area	Western terminus
Mount Charleston	3.61	5.81	SR 158 north (Deer Creek Road) – Lee Canyon, Indian Springs	Southern terminus of SR 158
Las Vegas	21.562	34.701	I-11 / US 95 (Purple Heart Highway, Veterans Memorial Highway) – Downtown Las Vegas, Tonopah, Reno	Diverging diamond interchange; current northern terminus of I-11; exit 96 on I-11/US 95
Las Vegas	21.562	34.701	Sunstone Parkway	Continuation beyond eastern terminus
1.000 mi = 1.609 km; 1.000 km = 0.621 mi
