= Interstate 155 =

Interstate 155 is the designation for two Interstate Highways in the United States, both of which are related to Interstate 55:

- Interstate 155 (Illinois), a spur to Peoria
- Interstate 155 (Missouri–Tennessee), a spur to Dyersburg, Tennessee
