= Mount Charleston, Nevada =

- Unincorporated town
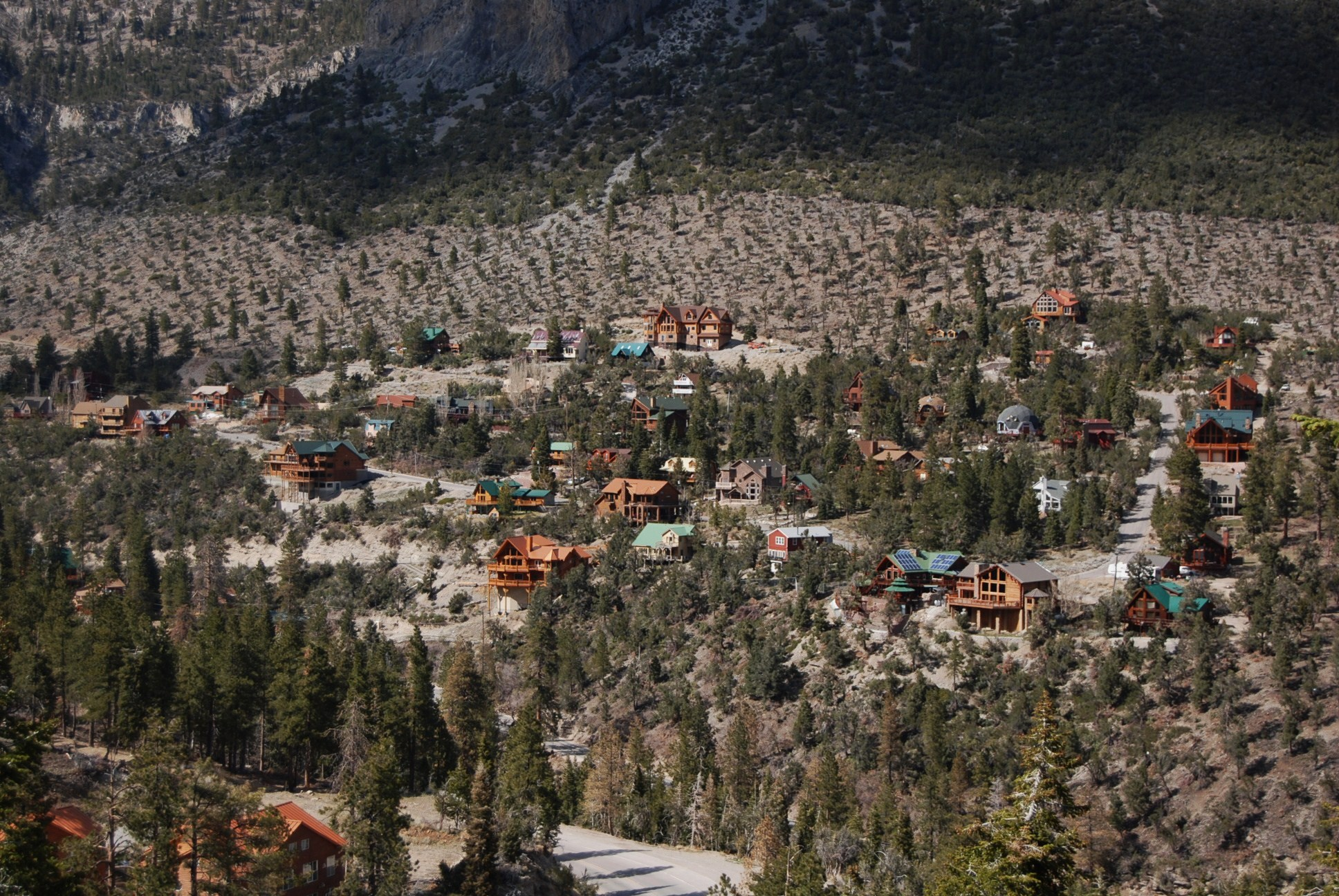

- Location of Mount Charleston in Clark County, Nevada

- Location in the United States
- Coordinates: 36°15′29″N 115°38′6″W
- Country: United States
- State: Nevada
- County: Clark
- Named for: Mount Charleston

Area
  - Total: 29.32 sq mi (75.93 km^{2})
  - Land: 29.32 sq mi (75.93 km^{2})
  - Water: 0 sq mi (0.00 km^{2})
- Elevation: 7,510 ft (2,289 m)

Population (2020)
  - Total: 314
  - Density: 10.7/sq mi (4.14/km^{2})
- Time zone: UTC-8 (PST)
  - Summer (DST): UTC-7 (PDT)
- ZIP code: 89124
- Area codes: 702 and 725
- FIPS code: 32-49310
- GNIS feature ID: 0859202
- Website: Mount Charleston Town Advisory Board

Mount Charleston is an unincorporated town and census-designated place in Clark County, Nevada, United States. The population was 357 at the 2010 census.

The town of Mount Charleston is named for nearby Mount Charleston whose Charleston Peak at 11,916 feet (3,632 m) is the highest point in Clark County. The town of Mount Charleston is in a valley of the Spring Mountains to the northwest of Las Vegas, noted for its hiking trails. It is also known for its Retreat on Charleston Peak, a 64-room hotel. At an elevation of approximately 7,500 feet, temperatures are much lower than in Las Vegas, which has an elevation of about 2,000 feet, making it a popular place for Las Vegans to vacation. The mean high temperature is 20.4 degrees (Fahrenheit) cooler than in Las Vegas. The area is also known as a vacation village for wealthy Las Vegas residents.

== Geography ==
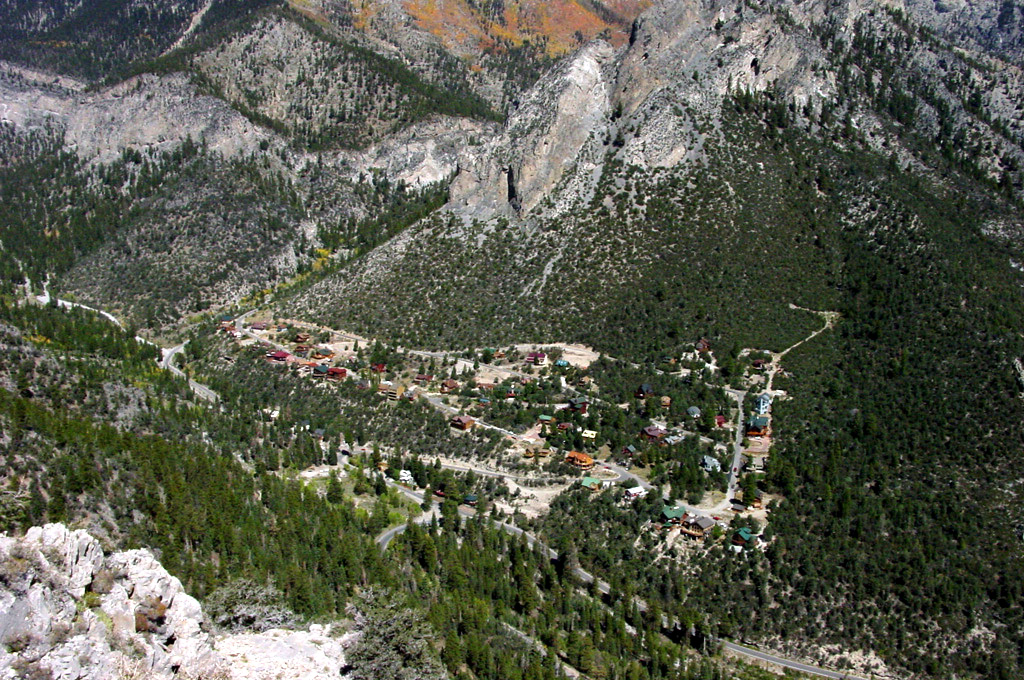
A view of Mt. Charleston

According to the United States Census Bureau, the census-designated place (CDP) of Mount Charleston (which may not coincide exactly with the town boundaries) has a total area of 29.4 square miles (76 km^{2}), all of it land. The communities comprising Mt. Charleston are made up of four subdivisions: Echo, Cathedral, Old Town and Rainbow, as well as a condominium complex next to the US Forest Service's Kyle Gateway.

== Demographics ==
Historical population
Census	Pop.	Note	%±
2000	285		—
2010	357		25.3%
2020	314		−12.0%
U.S. Decennial Census

As of the census of 2000, there were 285 people, 133 households, and 80 families residing in the CDP. The population density was 9.7 inhabitants per square mile (3.7/km^{2}). There were 362 housing units at an average density of 12.3 units per square mile (4.7 units/km^{2}). The racial makeup of the CDP was 97.54% White, 1.05% African American, 0.35% Pacific Islander, 0.70% from other races, and 0.35% from two or more races. Hispanic or Latino of any race were 2.46% of the population.

There were 133 households, out of which 18.0% had children under the age of 18 living with them, 52.6% were married couples living together, 4.5% had a female householder with no husband present, and 39.8% were non-families. 29.3% of all households were made up of individuals, and 2.3% had someone living alone who was 65 years of age or older. The average household size was 2.14 and the average family size was 2.69.

In the CDP, the population was spread out, with 15.8% under the age of 18, 3.9% from 18 to 24, 21.8% from 25 to 44, 45.3% from 45 to 64, and 13.3% who were 65 years of age or older. The median age was 49 years. For every 100 females, there were 119.2 males. For every 100 females age 18 and over, there were 124.3 males.

The median income for a household in the CDP was $63,125, and the median income for a family was $67,625. Males had a median income of $75,471 versus $35,938 for females. The per capita income for the CDP was $38,821. None of the population or families were below the poverty line.

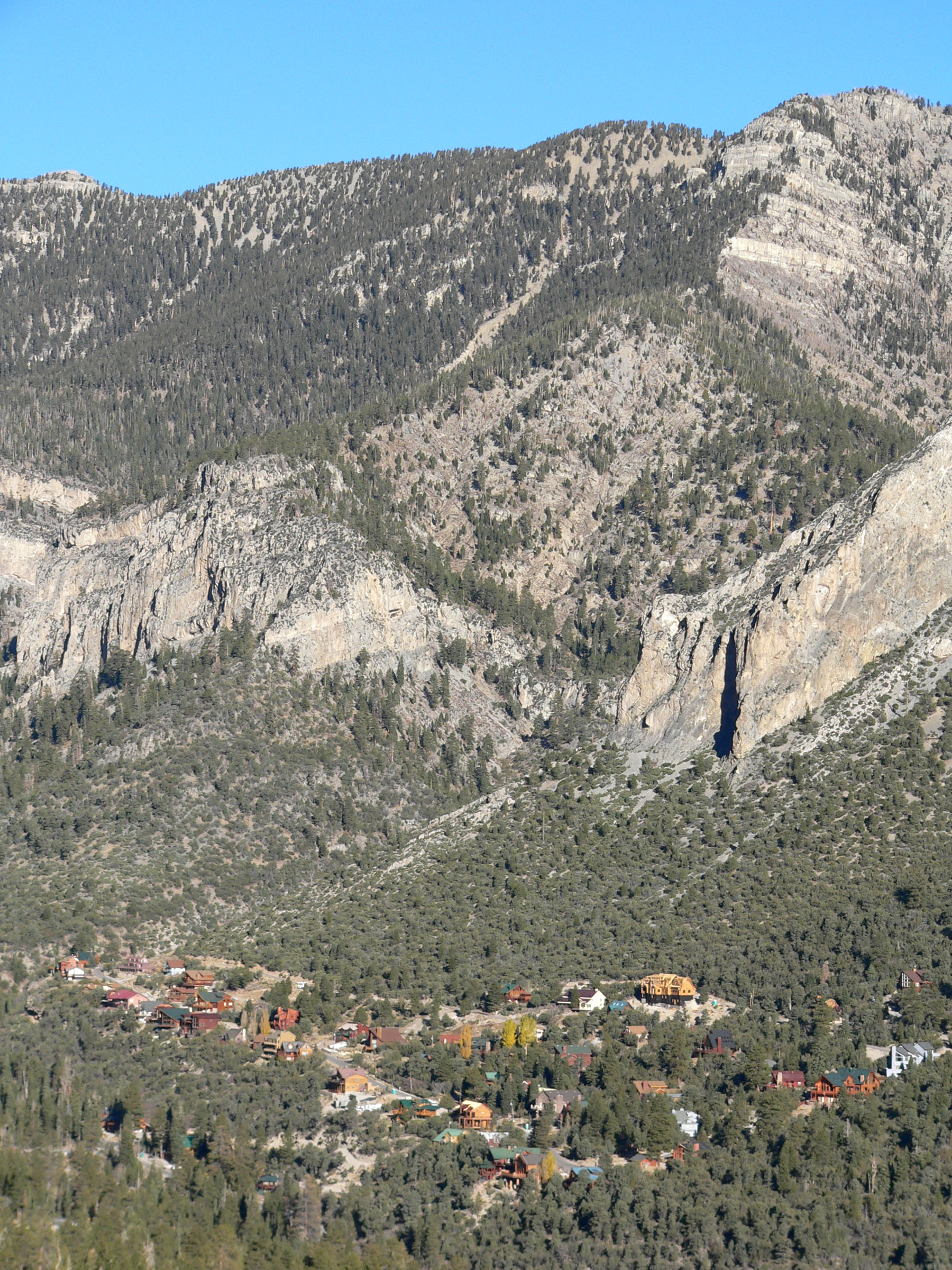
A view of some homes in Mt. Charleston.

== Transportation ==
Access to the community is from State Route 156, State Route 157 and State Route 158.

== Education ==
There is a two classroom elementary (K-5) school. Originally named in 1966 as the Mt. Charleston Elementary School, it was renamed in 2001 by the Clark County School District to the Earl B. Lundy Elementary School, in honor of its long time custodian. Mount Charleston has a public library, a branch of the Las Vegas-Clark County Library District.

== Climate ==
Mount Charleston has a cool Mediterranean climate (Köppen Csb), with some continental influence (Dsb) by 0 °C isotherm. The climate is very similar to that of Flagstaff, Arizona though with rather less frequent and abundant monsoonal storms. In contrast to the arid climate of the rest of Nevada, precipitation as rain and melted snow is sufficient to support coniferous forests, with typically 11 inches or 0.28 meters of snow on the ground in February and a maximum monthly snowfall in a limited record of 89 inches or 2.26 meters in December 2010. Summers are markedly cooler than in the lower deserts, with the average July high being only 79.0 °F or 26.1 °C and minima often below 50 °F or 10 °C. On average, over half of all nights are below 32 °F or 0 °C and in extreme cold waves, temperatures may fall below 0 °F or −17.8 °C, with −18 °F (−27.8 °C) reached during a cold wave in December 1990.

Climate data for Mount Charleston, Nevada, 1991–2020 normals, extremes 1949–present
Month	Jan	Feb	Mar	Apr	May	Jun	Jul	Aug	Sep	Oct	Nov	Dec	Year
Record high °F (°C)	70 (21)	69 (21)	73 (23)	79 (26)	86 (30)	93 (34)	98 (37)	93 (34)	90 (32)	83 (28)	79 (26)	69 (21)	98 (37)
Mean maximum °F (°C)	57.2 (14.0)	57.9 (14.4)	62.6 (17.0)	69.7 (20.9)	76.1 (24.5)	84.6 (29.2)	87.9 (31.1)	85.6 (29.8)	81.0 (27.2)	73.9 (23.3)	65.4 (18.6)	58.7 (14.8)	88.7 (31.5)
Mean daily maximum °F (°C)	44.2 (6.8)	44.4 (6.9)	49.1 (9.5)	54.7 (12.6)	63.3 (17.4)	73.8 (23.2)	79.0 (26.1)	77.9 (25.5)	71.6 (22.0)	61.6 (16.4)	51.4 (10.8)	43.9 (6.6)	59.6 (15.3)
Daily mean °F (°C)	32.9 (0.5)	33.2 (0.7)	37.4 (3.0)	42.2 (5.7)	50.2 (10.1)	59.7 (15.4)	65.6 (18.7)	65.0 (18.3)	57.9 (14.4)	48.2 (9.0)	39.0 (3.9)	32.5 (0.3)	47.0 (8.3)
Mean daily minimum °F (°C)	21.5 (−5.8)	21.9 (−5.6)	25.7 (−3.5)	29.8 (−1.2)	37.1 (2.8)	45.5 (7.5)	52.2 (11.2)	52.2 (11.2)	44.3 (6.8)	34.7 (1.5)	26.5 (−3.1)	21.1 (−6.1)	34.4 (1.3)
Mean minimum °F (°C)	4.8 (−15.1)	6.2 (−14.3)	9.7 (−12.4)	15.7 (−9.1)	23.7 (−4.6)	30.6 (−0.8)	41.3 (5.2)	41.0 (5.0)	30.8 (−0.7)	20.3 (−6.5)	11.4 (−11.4)	5.2 (−14.9)	0.4 (−17.6)
Record low °F (°C)	−12 (−24)	−15 (−26)	−4 (−20)	7 (−14)	16 (−9)	17 (−8)	31 (−1)	30 (−1)	17 (−8)	7 (−14)	−5 (−21)	−18 (−28)	−18 (−28)
Average precipitation inches (mm)	3.70 (94)	5.12 (130)	2.91 (74)	1.01 (26)	0.82 (21)	0.31 (7.9)	2.21 (56)	2.34 (59)	1.71 (43)	1.79 (45)	1.32 (34)	3.16 (80)	26.40 (671)
Average snowfall inches (cm)	20.5 (52)	29.3 (74)	17.2 (44)	6.2 (16)	1.6 (4.1)	0.3 (0.76)	0.0 (0.0)	0.0 (0.0)	0.0 (0.0)	1.0 (2.5)	7.7 (20)	16.3 (41)	100.1 (254.36)
Average extreme snow depth inches (cm)	15.8 (40)	21.1 (54)	17.4 (44)	5.7 (14)	0.6 (1.5)	0.0 (0.0)	0.0 (0.0)	0.0 (0.0)	0.0 (0.0)	0.8 (2.0)	4.0 (10)	11.8 (30)	21.8 (55)
Average precipitation days (≥ 0.01 in)	5.6	7.0	5.7	4.0	4.1	1.6	5.9	5.8	3.9	3.3	3.2	5.6	55.7
Average snowy days (≥ 0.1 in)	4.8	6.2	4.6	2.3	0.8	0.1	0.0	0.0	0.0	0.7	2.3	4.5	26.3
Source 1: NOAA
Source 2: National Weather Service

== History ==
=== Charleston Park ===
According to historian Stanley W. Paher, Conrad Keil (a.k.a. Kyle) built a sawmill and cabin in Kyle Canyon circa 1870–1880. It is shown on a 1881 plat map as being across from Fletcher Canyon, where the historic US Forest Service Administrative Site is located. A 1929 plat map shows that area was serviced by a water pipeline from Fletcher Spring. The Civilian Conservation Corps Camp Charleston Mountain was based there beginning in 1933. According to NVCRIS archaeological records in the Nevada State Historical Preservation Office, another pipeline originating from Fletcher Spring was run to three water tanks on present day Mt. Charleston Church property, which serviced the 1950s-1980s era Young Ranch. The historic Young Ranch property is presently the Retreat on Charleston Peak and Spring Mountains Visitor Gateway.

Edmund W. Griffith initially established a campground in Kyle Canyon around 1905, concurrent with establishment of the Tule Station on the Las Vegas & Tonopah Railroad. His development, shown on the 1929 plat map to be in the present day Old Town Subdivision, was named Charleston Park. Griffith's Charleston Park Lodge (a.k.a. Griffith's Lodge) was built around 1915. A casino was later added to the lodge, which burned down in 1961. Historical postcards in the Pomona, Calif. Public Library show that lodge was at the present location of the Mt. Charleston Library and Volunteer Fire Department

== Amenities ==
=== Mt. Charleston Lodge ===
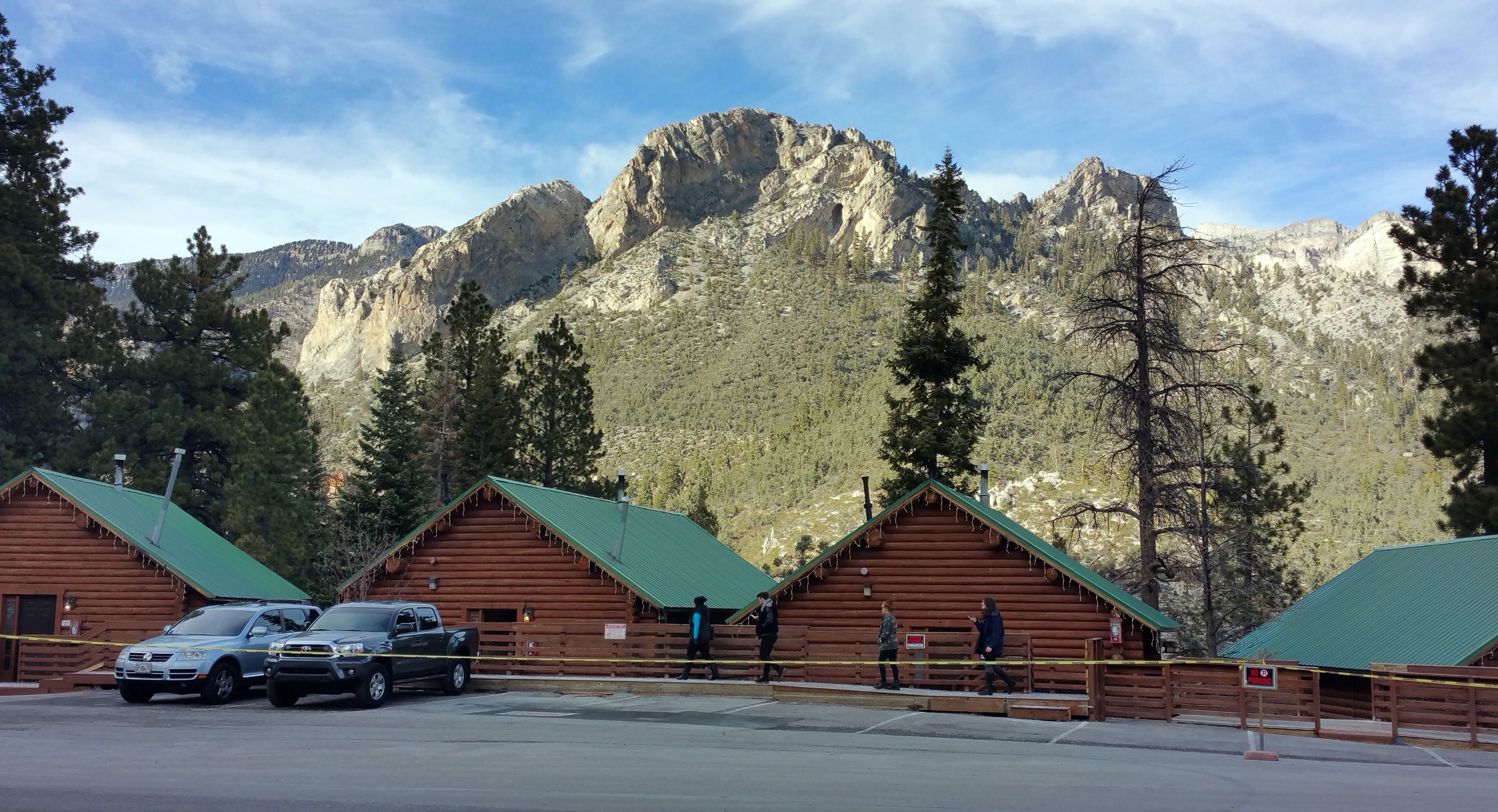
Cabins at Mt. Charleston Lodge (2015)

The Mt. Charleston Lodge was a longtime restaurant located adjacent to Cathedral Subdivision at the end of Nevada Rte. 157 Kyle Canyon Road. By 1948, the Mt. Charleston Lodge included a rustic 25-room lodge and 13 cottages, and was owned by the owners of the Frontier casino in Las Vegas.

A fire destroyed the Mt. Charleston Lodge on December 28, 1961. It took firefighters from Las Vegas more than an hour to reach the site, and a fire station was later built in Old Town to help stop any future fires. The Bailey family, owners of the Hacienda resort in Las Vegas, also owned the Mt. Charleston Lodge at the time of the fire, and they announced plans to rebuild it. Construction began in 1962. Four years later, a 150-person restaurant was added to the Mt. Charleston Lodge, which also had a 100-person lounge and 15 slot machines. The Orcutt family took over operations in 1974, and in 1994 added over a dozen cabins, located next to the restaurant. In 2018, it was sold to the Ellis family, which also owned the Ellis Island casino in Las Vegas.

On September 17, 2021, at approximately 4:45 a.m., a large fire destroyed the Mt. Charleston Lodge again. None of the adjacent cabins were damaged. The fire originated in a storage area under an exterior deck, and was not considered suspicious, although firefighters deemed the lodge a total loss. The Ellis family plans to rebuild the lodge, which was a local landmark and a popular gathering spot for the community. The cabins reopened a week after the fire.

In mid-2022, the Ellis family opened a temporary restaurant on the site known as Pine Dining, housed in a tent structure. Later that year, the family unveiled plans for a new Mt. Charleston Lodge that could include a hotel with more than 30 rooms.

=== Hotel ===
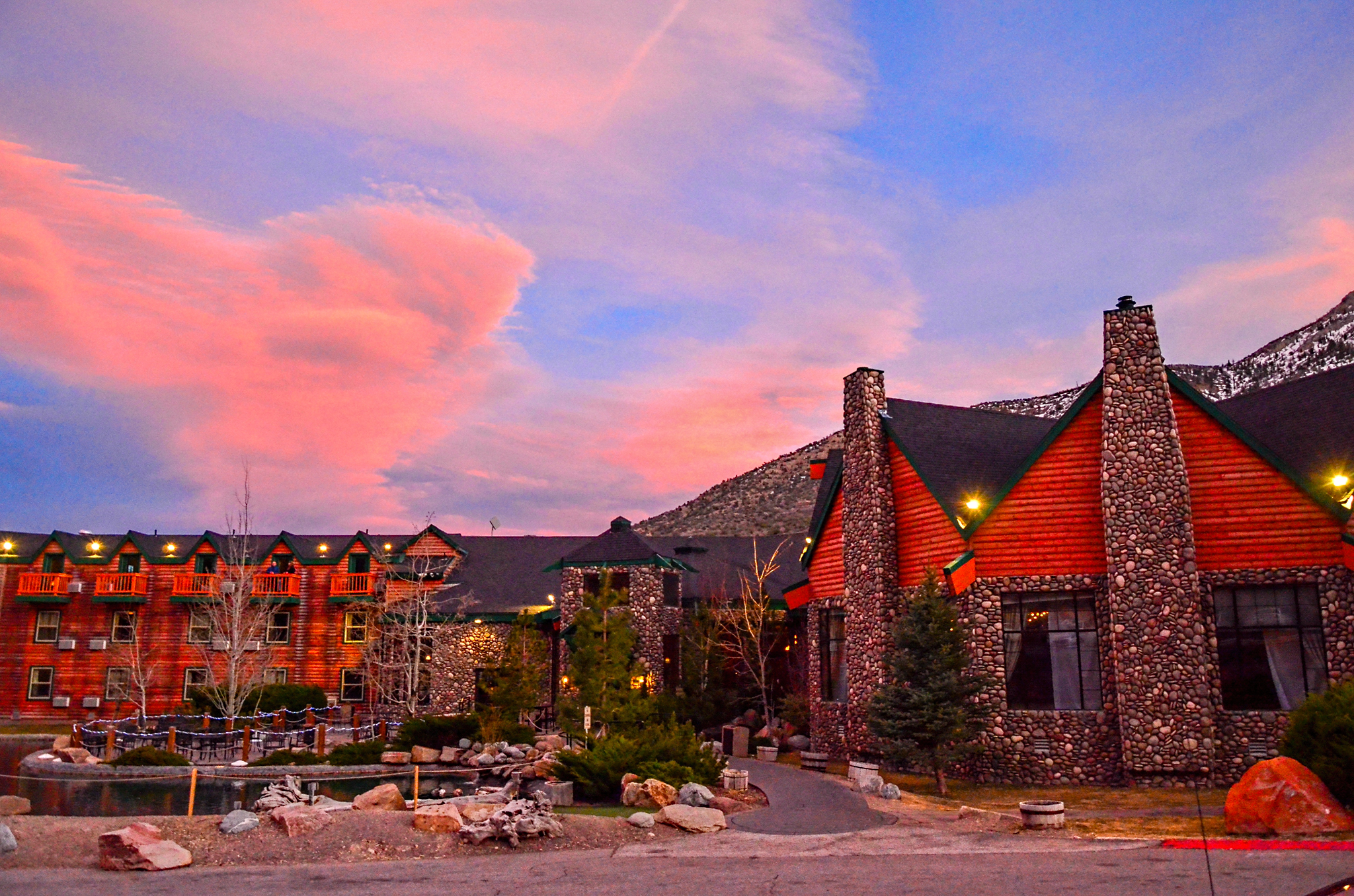
The Resort on Mount Charleston (2016)

The Mount Charleston Hotel was built along Kyle Canyon Road in 1984. It has 64 rooms and a restaurant. In 2008, it was purchased by The Siegel Group, which renovated and renamed it as the Resort on Mount Charleston. In 2018, it was sold and renovated again, rebranded as the Retreat on Charleston Peak.

=== Canceled project ===
In 1996, plans were announced for the Mount Charleston Golf Resort to be built in the area, as part of a project known as Alpine Village. The golf course opened in July 1997, next to the Mount Charleston Hotel. Later that year, the golf course was put up for sale. A hotel had been planned to accompany the course, but it was never built. Mount Charleston residents opposed plans for a shopping center that would also accompany the project. The shopping center was eventually rejected by the Clark County Commission.

The developer then started negotiations to swap the entire property with the federal government, which eventually purchased the site in 2004. The golf course had never been a popular attraction, and the U.S. Forest Service intended to restore the land to its natural state. Unfinished buildings from the project would be demolished, and the Forest Service planned to build a recreational complex on the site.
