= Wyoming Highway 157 =

State highway in Wyoming, United States

Wyoming Highway 157
- WYO 157 highlighted in red

Route information
- Maintained by WYDOT
- Length: 7.99 mi (12.86 km)

Major junctions
- West end: US 26 southeast of Fort Laramie
- East end: WYO 156 in Lingle

Location
- Country: United States
- State: Wyoming
- Counties: Goshen

Highway system
- Wyoming State Highway System; Interstate; US; State
← WYO 156	→ WYO 158

Wyoming Highway 157 (WYO 157) is a 7.99-mile-long (12.86 km) Wyoming State Road located in central Goshen County west of Lingle.

== Route description ==
Wyoming Highway 157 is an L-shaped route 7.99 miles (12.86 km) in length, and is located west of the town of Lingle. Approximately the first 2 miles (3.2 km) run north–south and the remaining 5 miles (8.0 km) east–west. WYO 157 travels from US Route 26 southeast of Fort Laramie south across the North Platte River before turning east and heading toward Lingle. WYO 157 serves the southern side of the river between its two ends. Highway 157 ends at Wyoming Highway 156 just south of the WYO 156/US 26/US 85 junction in Lingle.

Mileposts along Highway 157 increase from east to west.

== Major intersections ==
The entire route is in Goshen County.

Location	mi	km	Destinations	Notes
	0.00	0.00	US 26	
Lingle	7.99	12.86	WYO 156	
1.000 mi = 1.609 km; 1.000 km = 0.621 mi
