= List of highways numbered 152 =

The following highways are numbered 152:

== Canada ==
- Prince Edward Island Route 152

== Costa Rica ==
- National Route 152

== Cuba ==
- Road to San Luis (1–152)
- Bayamo–Las Tunas Road (6–152)

== India ==
- National Highway 152 (India)

== Japan ==
- Japan National Route 152

== United Kingdom ==
- A152 road
- B152 road

== United States ==
- U.S. Route 152 (former)
- Alabama State Route 152
- Arkansas Highway 152
- California State Route 152
- Connecticut Route 152
- Florida State Road 152
- Georgia State Route 152
- Illinois Route 152
- Indiana State Road 152
- Iowa Highway 152
- K-152 (Kansas highway)
- Kentucky Route 152
- Louisiana Highway 152
- Maine State Route 152
- Maryland Route 152
- Massachusetts Route 152
- M-152 (Michigan highway)
- Minnesota State Highway 152
- Missouri Route 152
- New Hampshire Route 152
- New Jersey Route 152
- New Mexico State Road 152
- New York State Route 152 (former)
- North Carolina Highway 152
- Ohio State Route 152
- Oklahoma State Highway 152
- Pennsylvania Route 152
- Rhode Island Route 152
- Tennessee State Route 152
- Texas State Highway 152
  - Texas State Highway Spur 152
- Utah State Route 152
- Virginia State Route 152
- West Virginia Route 152
- Wisconsin Highway 152
- Wyoming Highway 152

Territories

- Puerto Rico Highway 152
  - Puerto Rico Highway 152R

Preceded by 151	Lists of highways 152	Succeeded by 153
