= Nevada State Route 156 =

State highway in Nevada, United States

State Route 156
- Lee Canyon Road
- Nevada State Route 156, highlighted in red

Route information
- Maintained by NDOT
- Length: 17.544 mi (28.234 km)
- Existed: July 1, 1976–present

Major junctions
- West end: Dead end in Lee Canyon
- SR 158 (Deer Creek Road) in Spring Mountains National Recreation Area
- East end: Future I-11 / US 95 southeast of Indian Springs

Location
- Country: United States
- State: Nevada
- County: Clark

Highway system
- Nevada State Highway System; Interstate; US; State; Pre‑1976; Scenic
← SR 147	→ SR 157

State Route 156 (SR 156), also known as Lee Canyon Road, is a state highway in Clark County, Nevada. The road is one of two highways connecting U.S. Route 95 (US 95) to the Humboldt-Toiyabe National Forest and Spring Mountains area northwest of Las Vegas and its entire length is designated a Nevada Scenic Byway.

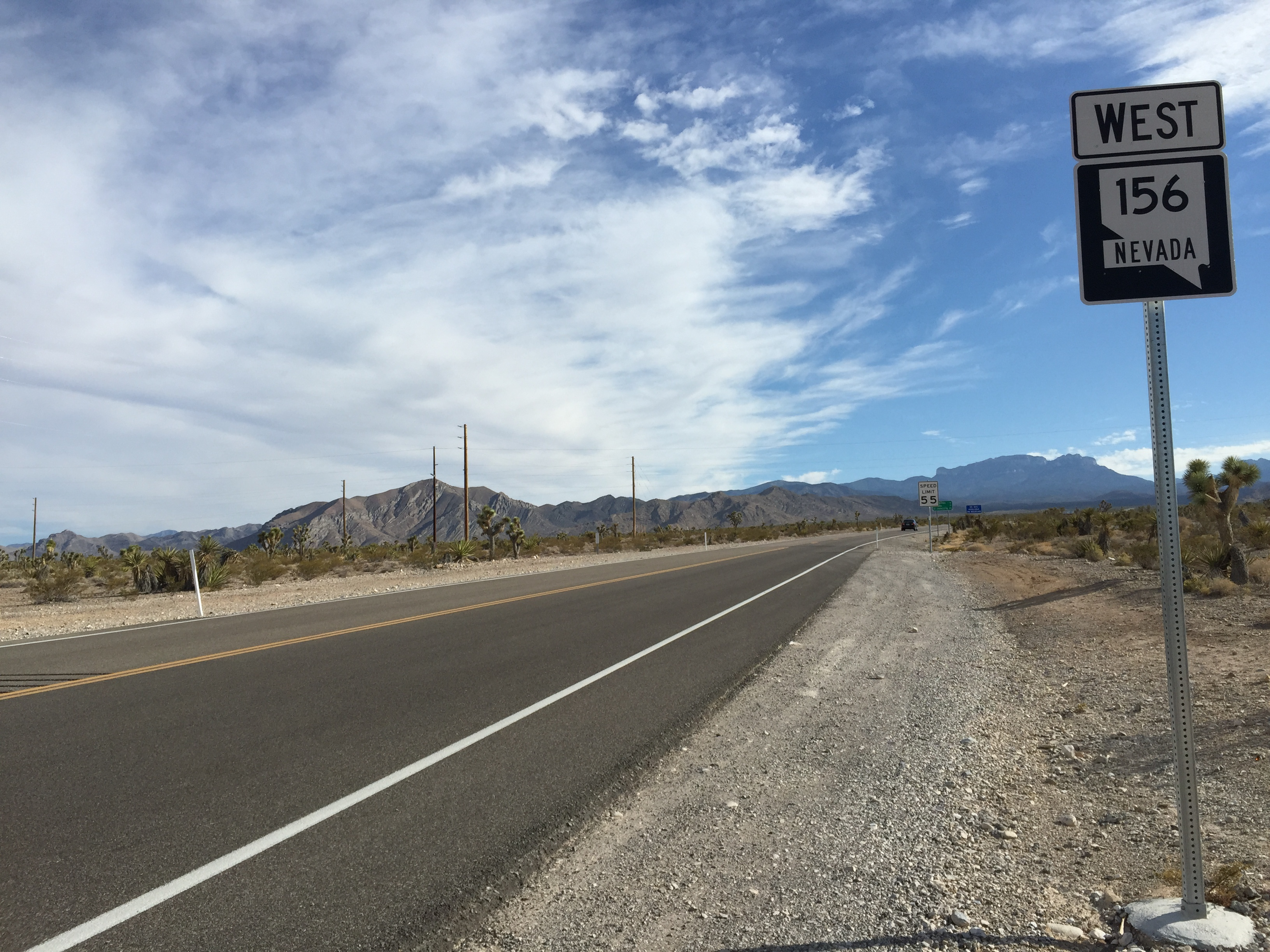
View from the east end of SR 156 looking westbound in 2015

When first created in the 1930s, the highway followed a slightly different path that formed State Route 52. The SR 52 designation was later realigned and extended west to the California state line via Pahrump, but was discontinuous through the national forest. The route was ultimately split into separate highways in the 1970s.

== History ==
SR 156 was originally part of State Route 52

The road now known as State Route 156 has origins dating to at least 1933. At that time, it was an unimproved county road that ran from State Route 5 (now US 95) at Indian Springs to the northern border of what was then called the Nevada National Forest. By 1935, this road had been designated as State Route 52, and apparently extended through the national forest (along what may now be State Route 158) ending at State Route 39 (now SR 157) east of Charleston Peak.

The routing of SR 52 had been changed by 1937. The highway was moved to the current alignment of Lee Canyon Road, beginning on State Route 5 several miles southeast of Indian Springs and ending in Lee Canyon. Around the same time, the highway designation was extended further west. SR 52 now traveled southwest through the national forest lands, crossing State Route 16 (now SR 160) in Pahrump to end at the California state line (on what is now California State Route 178) en route to Shoshone, resulting in approximately 47 miles (76 km) of unimproved highway. By 1940, the eastern end of the route between US 95 and the Nevada National Forest had been fully paved. However, a gap now existed between the paved portion of the highway within the national forest and the unimproved road southwest of the western forest boundary. A trail through the Spring Mountains would connect the two segments of State Route 52 in later years. While improvements were made to the western portion of the route in the 1950s and 1960s, the trail through Clark Canyon was never improved to a full roadway.

On July 1, 1976, Nevada began the process of renumbering all of the state's numbered highways. The Lee Canyon Road portion of SR 52 was redesignated as State Route 156, while the portion between Pahrump and the California state line was renumbered to State Route 372. The remainder of the route, from Pahrump to the Toiyabe National Forest, was removed from the state highway system. The changes in route numbering were reflected on official state highway maps beginning in 1978.

By 2017, the first 0.627 miles (1.009 km) of SR 156 at the Lee Canyon ski area had been removed from the routing.

The Nevada Department of Transportation designated State Route 156 as a Nevada Scenic Byway in July 1998. The "Mount Charleston/Lee Canyon Road" scenic route encompasses the entire 17.5 miles (28.2 km) of highway.

== Major intersections ==
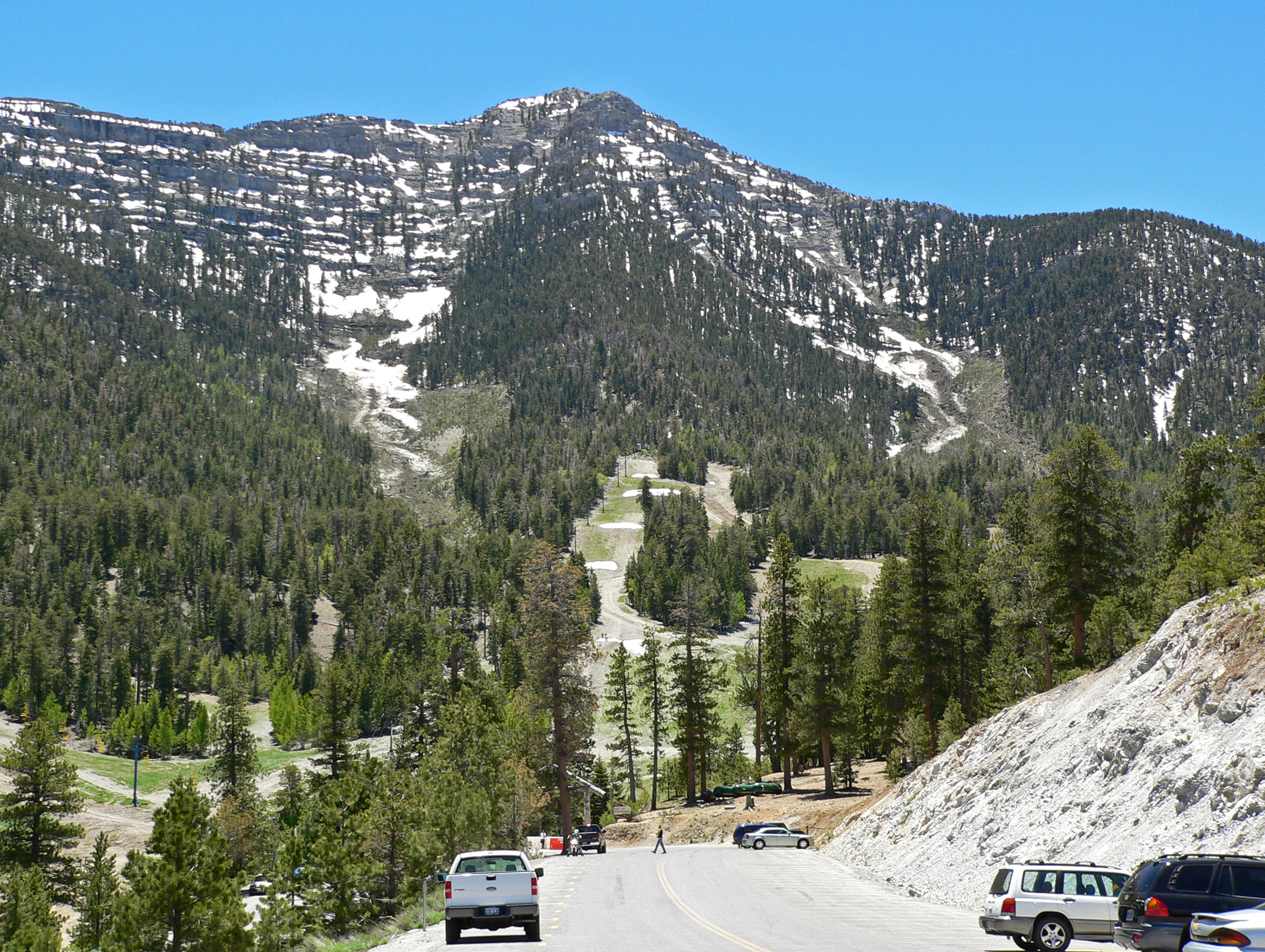
The former end of SR 156 in Lee Canyon in 2005

The entire route is in Clark County.

Location	mi	km	Destinations	Notes
Lee Canyon	0.000	0.000	Lee Canyon Ski Area	Loop; Lee Canyon Road continues 0.627 mi (1.009 km) to a dead end
Lee Canyon			SR 158 south (Deer Creek Road) – Mount Charleston, Las Vegas	Northern terminus of SR 158
Tule Springs Fossil Beds National Monument	17.544	28.234	Future I-11 / US 95 – Las Vegas, Tonopah, Reno	Proposed interchange; eastern terminus
1.000 mi = 1.609 km; 1.000 km = 0.621 mi
