= Nevada State Route 158 =

Highway in Nevada

State Route 158
- Deer Creek Road
- Nevada State Route 158, highlighted in red

Route information
- Maintained by NDOT
- Length: 8.853 mi (14.248 km)
- Existed: July 1, 1976–present

Major junctions
- South end: SR 157 in Mount Charleston
- North end: SR 156 in Lee Canyon

Location
- Country: United States
- State: Nevada
- County: Clark

Highway system
- Nevada State Highway System; Interstate; US; State; Pre‑1976; Scenic
← SR 157	→ SR 159

State Route 158 (SR 158), also known as Deer Creek Road, is a state highway in Clark County, Nevada. The route connects Kyle Canyon Road to Lee Canyon Road in the Spring Mountains, in the Humboldt-Toiyabe National Forest.

State Route 158 is a designated a Nevada Scenic Byway.

== Route description ==
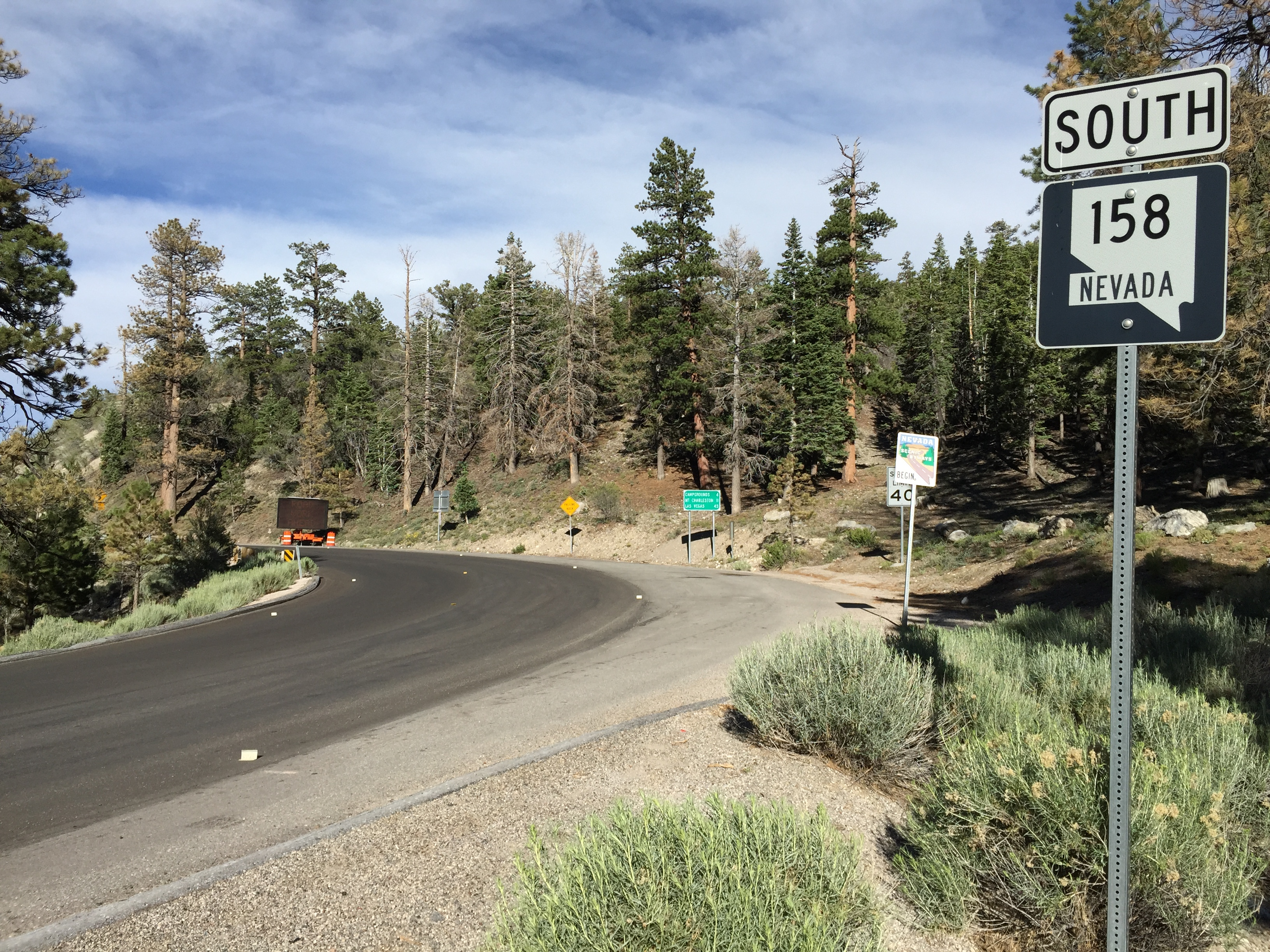
View from the north end of SR 158 looking southbound in 2015

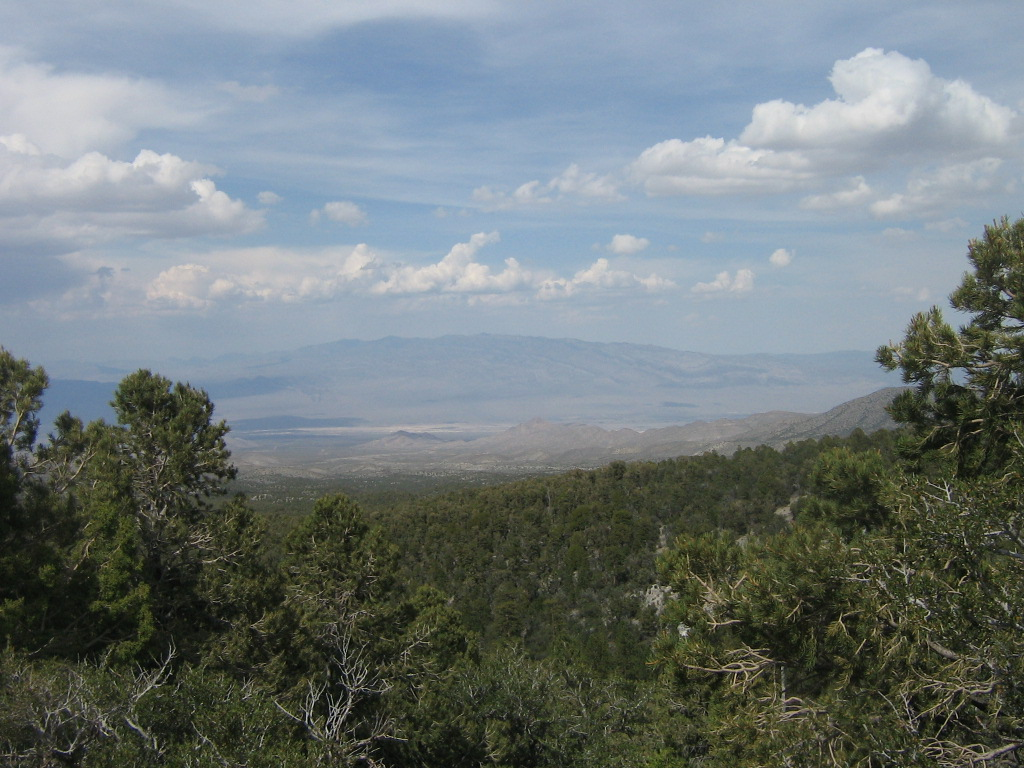
View from the summit of SR 158, at an elevation of 8437 feet in 2009

The route begins at an intersection with Kyle Canyon Road (SR 157) east of Mount Charleston. Heading north as the Deer Creek Road, SR 158 parallels the Humboldt-Toiyabe National Forest boundary before entering the forest. The highway ends at a junction with Lee Canyon Road (SR 156).

== History ==
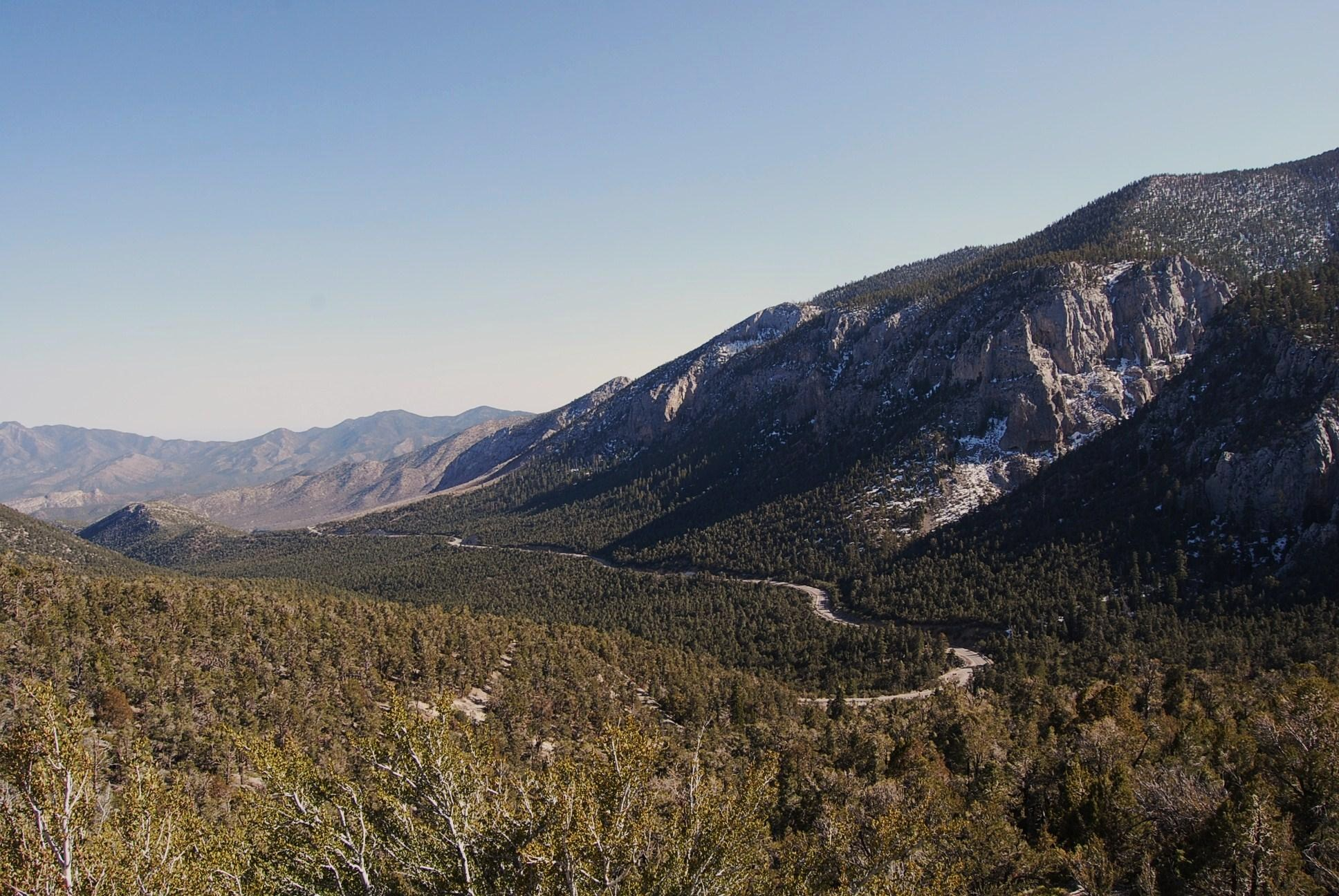
SR 158 winding through the Spring Mountains in 2012

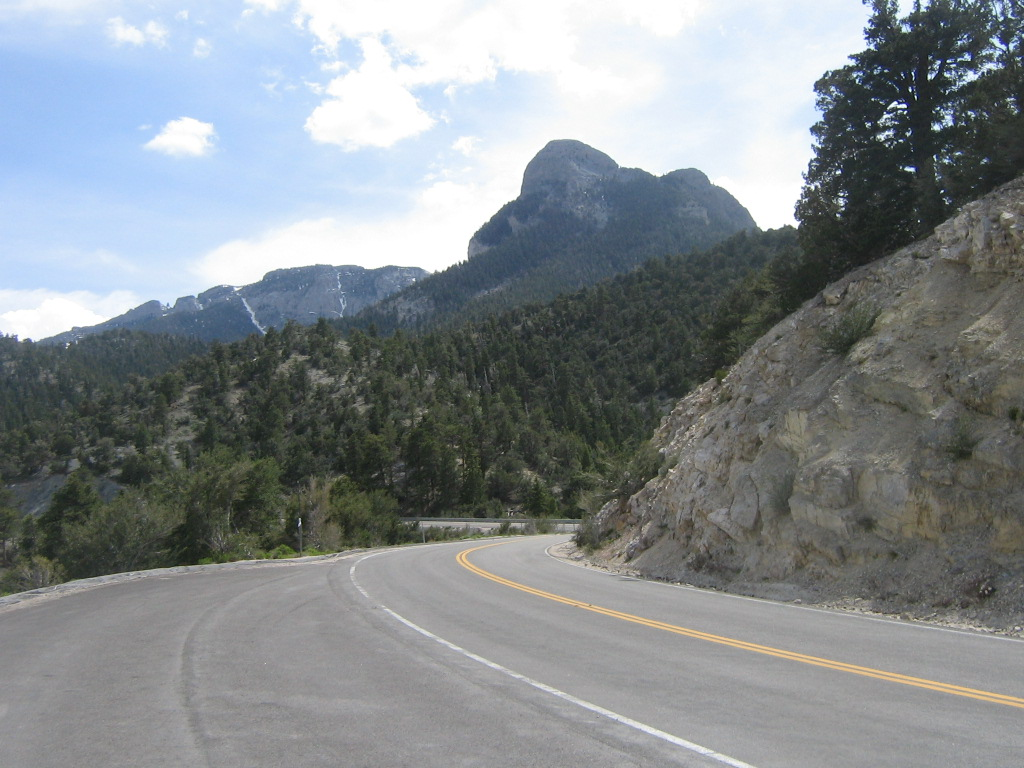
A bend in SR 158 at the summit of the highway in 2009

The Nevada Department of Transportation designated State Route 156 as a Nevada Scenic Byway in July 1998. The "Deer Creek Road" scenic route encompasses the entire 8.8-mile (14.2 km) highway.

== Major intersections ==
The entire route is in Clark County.

Location	mi	km	Destinations	Notes
Mount Charleston	0.000	0.000	SR 157 (Kyle Canyon Road) – Las Vegas	Southern terminus
Lee Canyon	8.853	14.248	SR 156 (Lee Canyon Road) – Indian Springs	Northern terminus
1.000 mi = 1.609 km; 1.000 km = 0.621 mi
