= Spring Mountains National Recreation Area =

Recreation area in Nevada, United States

- IUCN category V (protected landscape/seascape)
- Location within Nevada Location within the United States
- Location: Clark / Nye counties, Nevada, United States
- Nearest city: Las Vegas, Nevada
- Coordinates: 36°16′18″N 115°41′40″W
- Area: 316,000 acres (494 sq mi; 1,280 km^{2})
- Established: August 4, 1993
- Governing body: United States Forest Service
- Website: Spring Mountains National Recreation Area

The Spring Mountains National Recreation Area (SMNRA) is a U.S. national recreation area, administered by the U.S. Forest Service, west of Las Vegas, Nevada. It covers over 316,000 acres (494 sq mi; 1,280 km^{2}). The area runs from low meadows (around 3,000 feet or 910 meters above sea level), to the 11,918-foot (3,633 m) Mount Charleston. The SMNRA is a part of the Humboldt-Toiyabe National Forest. It adjoins the Red Rock Canyon National Conservation Area, which is administered by the Bureau of Land Management.

Spring Mountains National Recreation Area is home to several plant and animal species that are threatened. This was the driving force to create the Mount Charleston Wilderness area.

The SMNRA offers activities such as hiking, picnicking, and skiing at the Las Vegas Ski and Snowboard Resort.

== History ==
The area was first named the Charleston Forest Reserve in 1906.

Additional land was added in 1989 to bring the area up to the current 316,000+ acres (1,279 km^{2}). The area was designated as Spring Mountains National Recreation Area by the U.S. Congress in 1993.

== Activities ==
=== Mountain Biking ===
- Bristlecone Trail
- Lower Bristlecone Trailhead
- Sawmill Trailhead
- Upper Bristlecone Trailhead

=== Campgrounds ===
- Fletcher View Campground
- Hilltop Campground
- Kyle Canyon Road
- McWilliams Campground
- Mt. Charleston Scenic Byway

=== Backpacking ===
- Kyle Canyon Road
- Mt. Charleston National Recreation Trail (S. Loop)
- Mt. Charleston Scenic Byway
- North Loop Trail

=== Hiking ===
- Bonanza Trail
- Cathedral Rock Connector Trail
- Cathedral Rock Trail
- Cathedral Rock Trailhead
- Echo Trailhead
- Fletcher Canyon Trail
- Fletcher Canyon Trailhead
- Griffith Peak Trail
- Griffith Peak Trailhead
- Kyle Canyon Road
- Lower Bristlecone Trailhead
- Mary Jane Falls Trail
- Mary Jane Trailhead
- Mt. Charleston National Recreation Trail (S. Loop)
- Mt. Charleston Scenic Byway
- North Loop Trail
- North Loop Trailhead
- Robbers Roost Trailhead
- Sawmill Loop Trail
- Sawmill Ridge Route Trail
- Sawmill Trailhead
- Trail Canyon Trail
- Trail Canyon Trailhead
- Upper Bristlecone Trail
- Upper Bristlecone Trailhead

=== Picnicking ===
- Cathedral Rock Picnic Site
- Deer Creek Picnic Site
- Kyle Canyon Picnic Area
- Kyle Canyon Road
- Mt. Charleston Scenic Byway
- Old Mill Picnic Site
- Sawmill Trailhead

Areas for Group Picnicking at Spring Mountains National Recreation Area Office

- Foxtail Group Picnic Site
- Kyle Canyon Picnic Area

=== Winter Sports ===
- Lee Canyon (Ski and Snowboard Resort)
- Mt. Charleston Scenic Byway

== Gallery ==
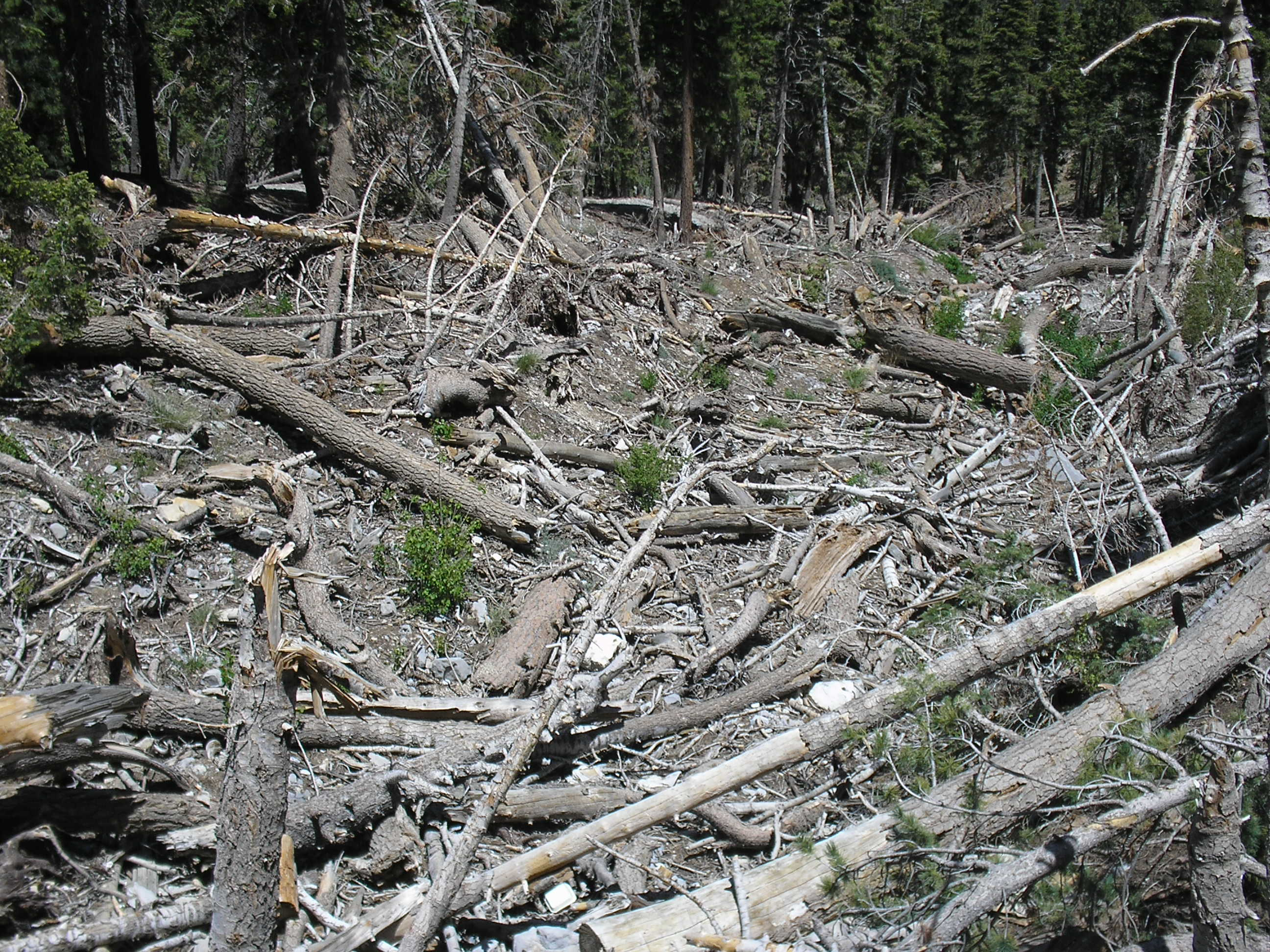
Cathedral Rock Trail Avalanche chute: Destruction of trees taken on June 1, 2008

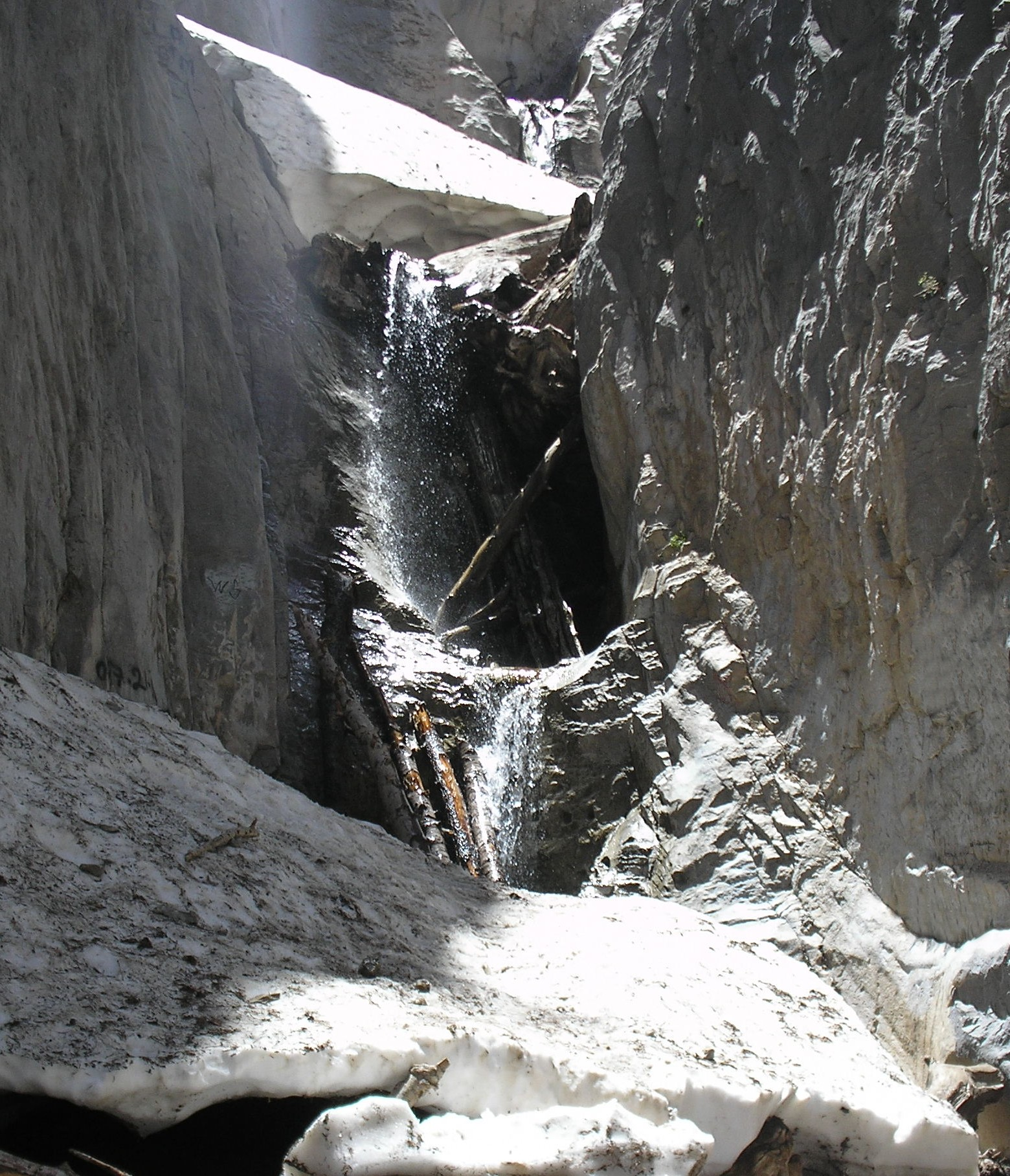
Little Falls on June 1, 2008

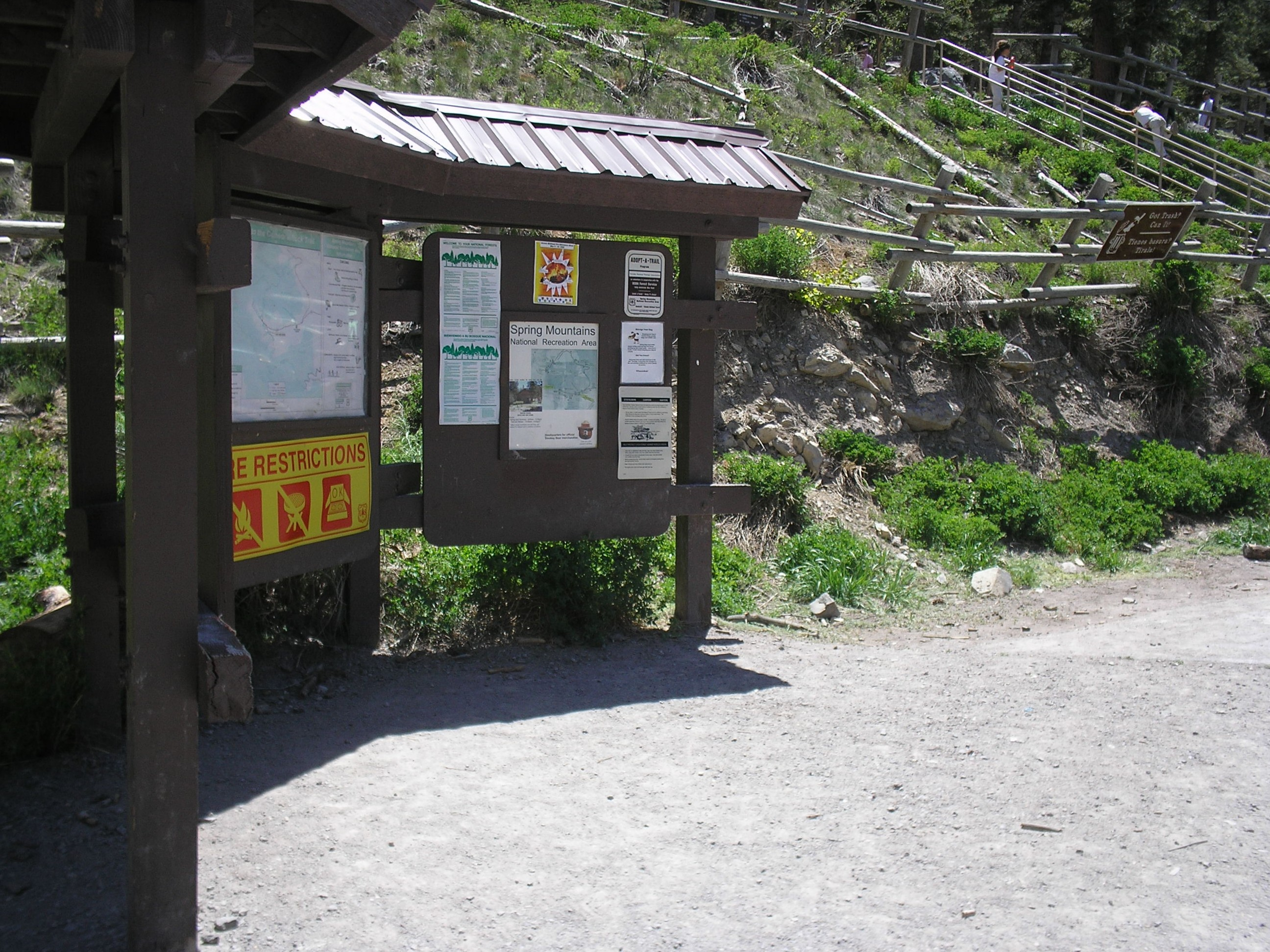
Entrance and Sign

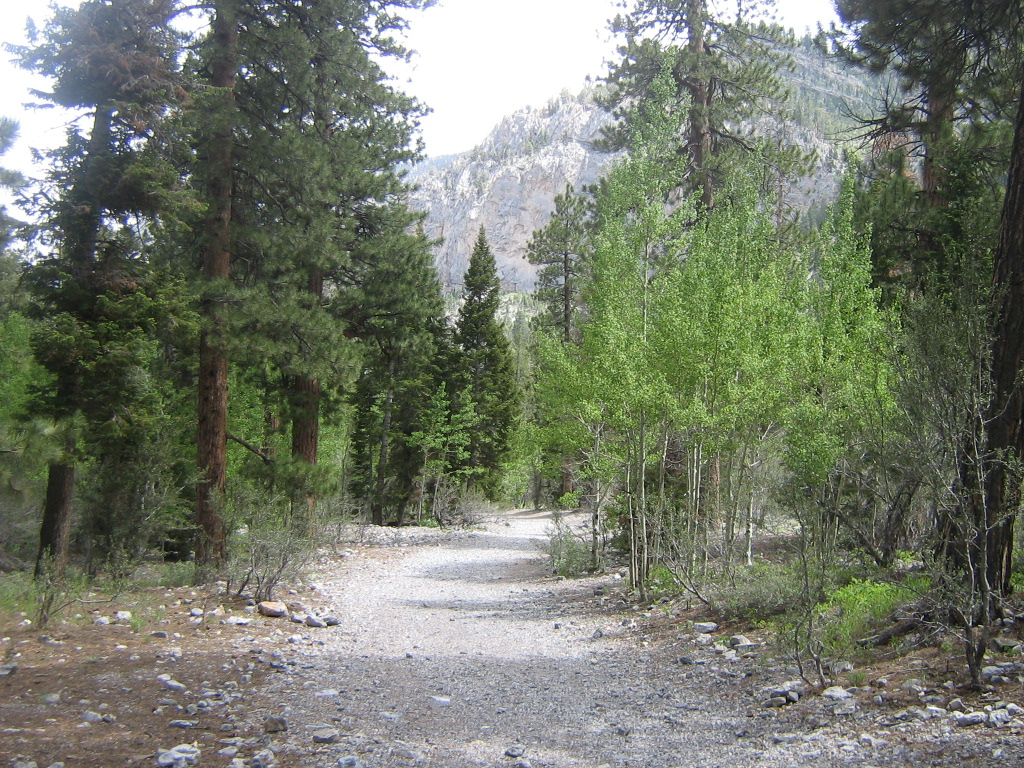
A hiking trail in the mountains.

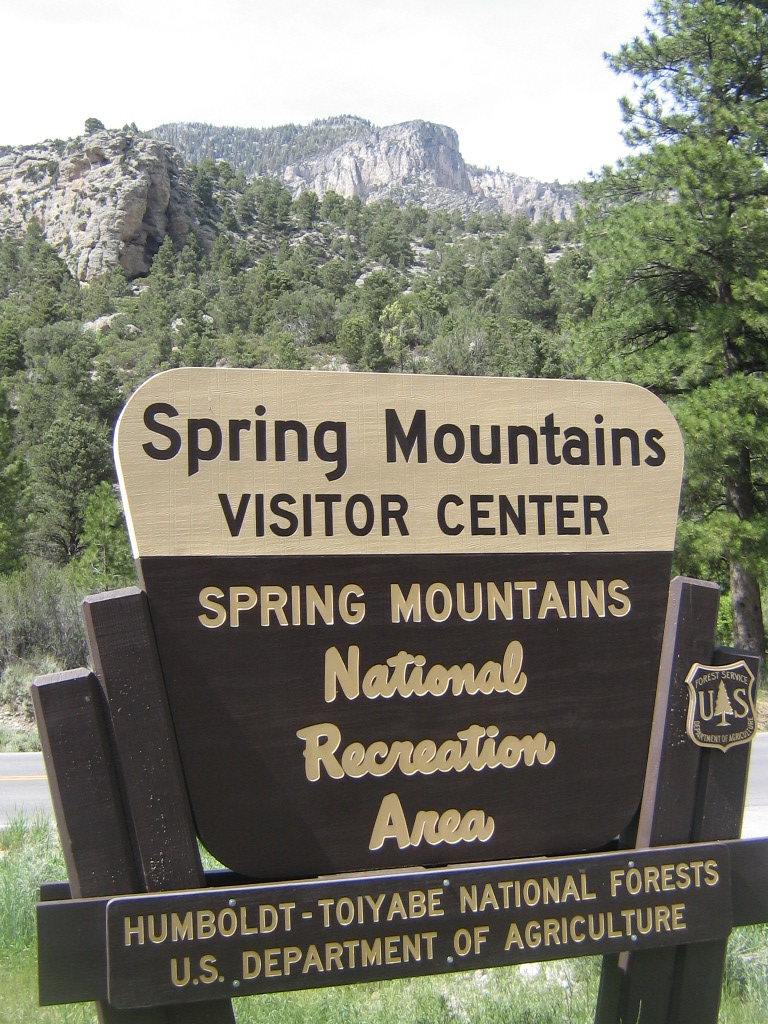
Forest Service sign at the Visitor center

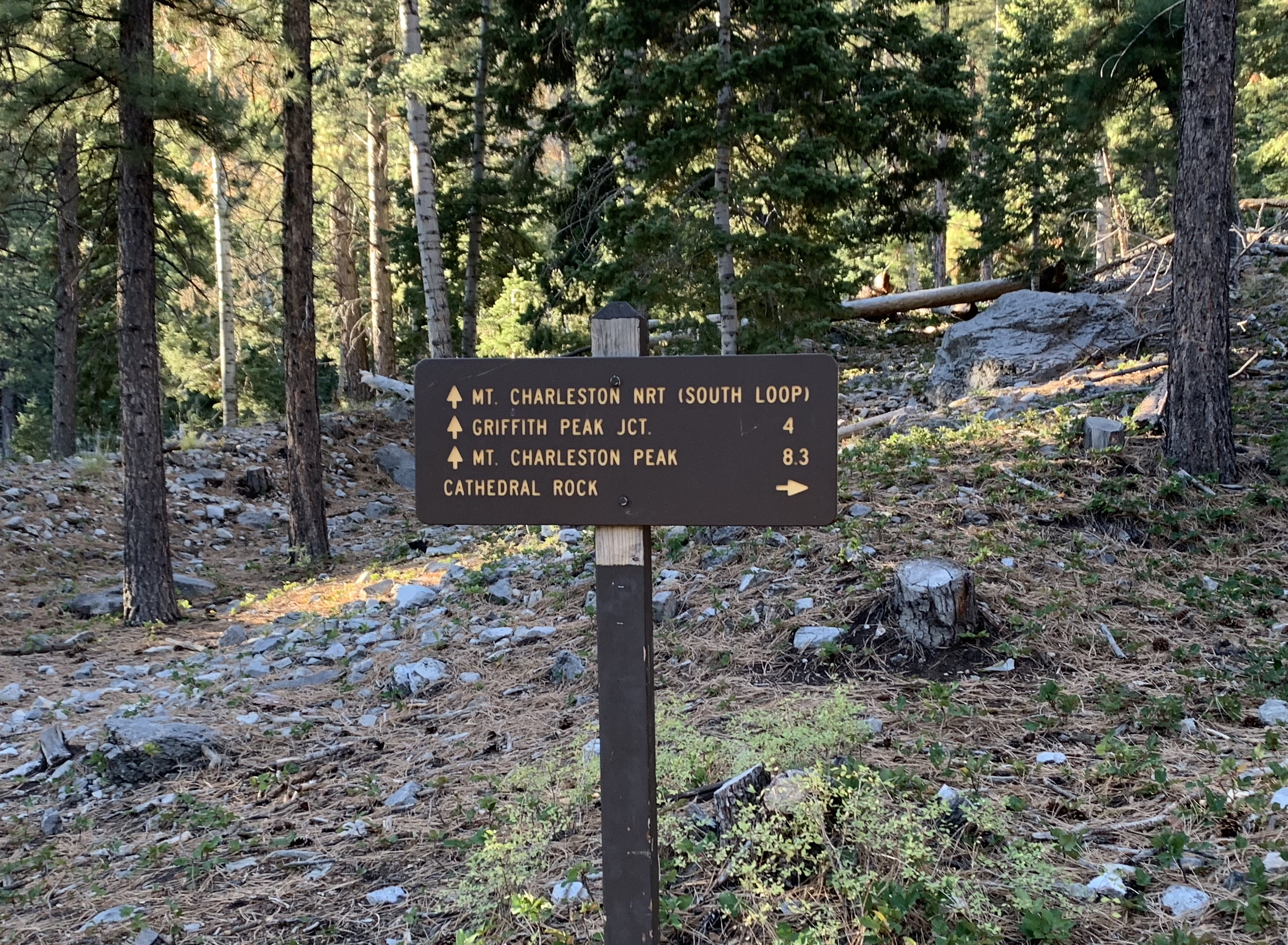
Charleston Peak South Loop Trail Sign

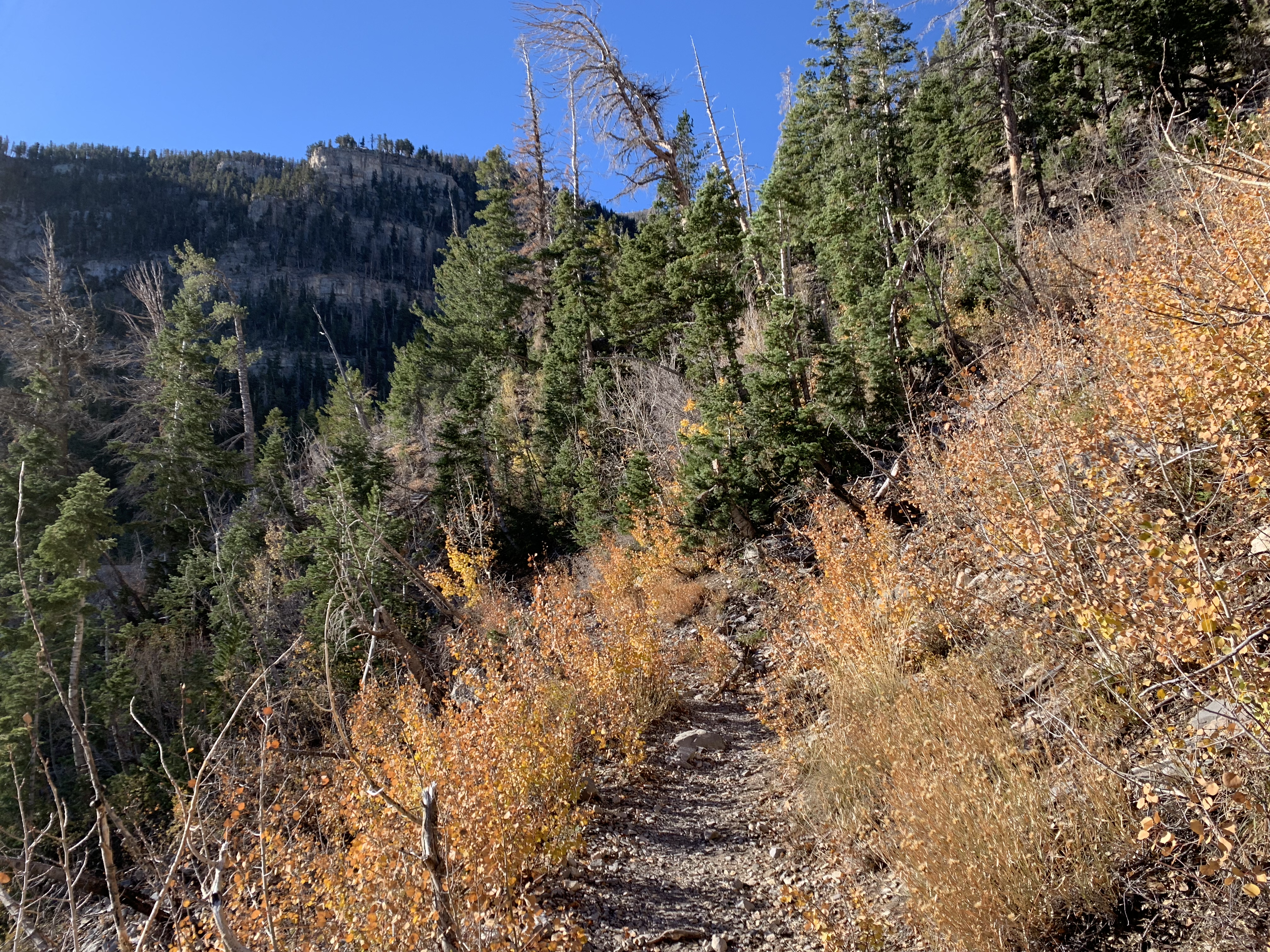
Fall Colors on South Loop Trail to Charleston Peak
