= Moon Valley, Phoenix =

Neighborhood in Phoenix, AZ

Moon Valley
- Neighborhood
- Interactive map of Moon Valley
- Coordinates: 33°37′00″N 112°04′41″W
- City: Phoenix, Arizona

Moon Valley is a neighborhood of approximately 1,600 homes located in the northern part of Phoenix, Arizona. The neighborhood, which comprises 29 separate subdivisions, was established in the early 1960s and is centered on the Moon Valley Country Club, a private country club. It is bounded by 7th Street to the east, Thunderbird Road to the south, and Coral Gables Drive to the west and north. Lookout Mountain Preserve and North Mountain and Shaw Butte Preserves, two city parks that are part of the Phoenix Mountains Preserve, lie adjacent to the south and east of the neighborhood.

== Moon Valley Country Club ==
The Moon Valley Country Club is located in the geographic center of the Moon Valley neighborhood. The Club offers an 18-hole Championship golf course, a driving range, and an 18-hole par-3 golf course called the "MoonWalk". The Club also offers tennis courts, an aquatic center, a fitness center, a restaurant and bar, a pro shop, and event space. The club went through a noteworthy bankruptcy in 2013, but was reorganized after financial support from the community prevented redevelopment of the course into condominiums.

== Neighborhood association ==
Although two smaller homeowner associations exist in Moon Valley, the entire neighborhood is represented by the Moon Valley Neighborhood Association (MVNA). The MVNA collects voluntary dues each year to fund community events, organize neighborhood improvements, and advocate for the neighborhood to local elected officials. The MVNA also hires a security service to patrol the neighborhood throughout the year.

== Notable residents ==
- John Shadegg, former US Congressman for Arizona's 3rd District from 1995 to 2011
