= Mummy Mountain =

Mummy Mountain is the name of several mountains in the United States:

- Mummy Mountain (Arizona)
- Mummy Mountain (Colorado)
- Mummy Mountain (Michigan) in Michigan
- Mummy Mountain (Nevada)
- Mummy Mountain (Wyoming) in Wyoming
