= Piestewa Peak =

Landform in Phoenix, Arizona

- Vainom Do'ag
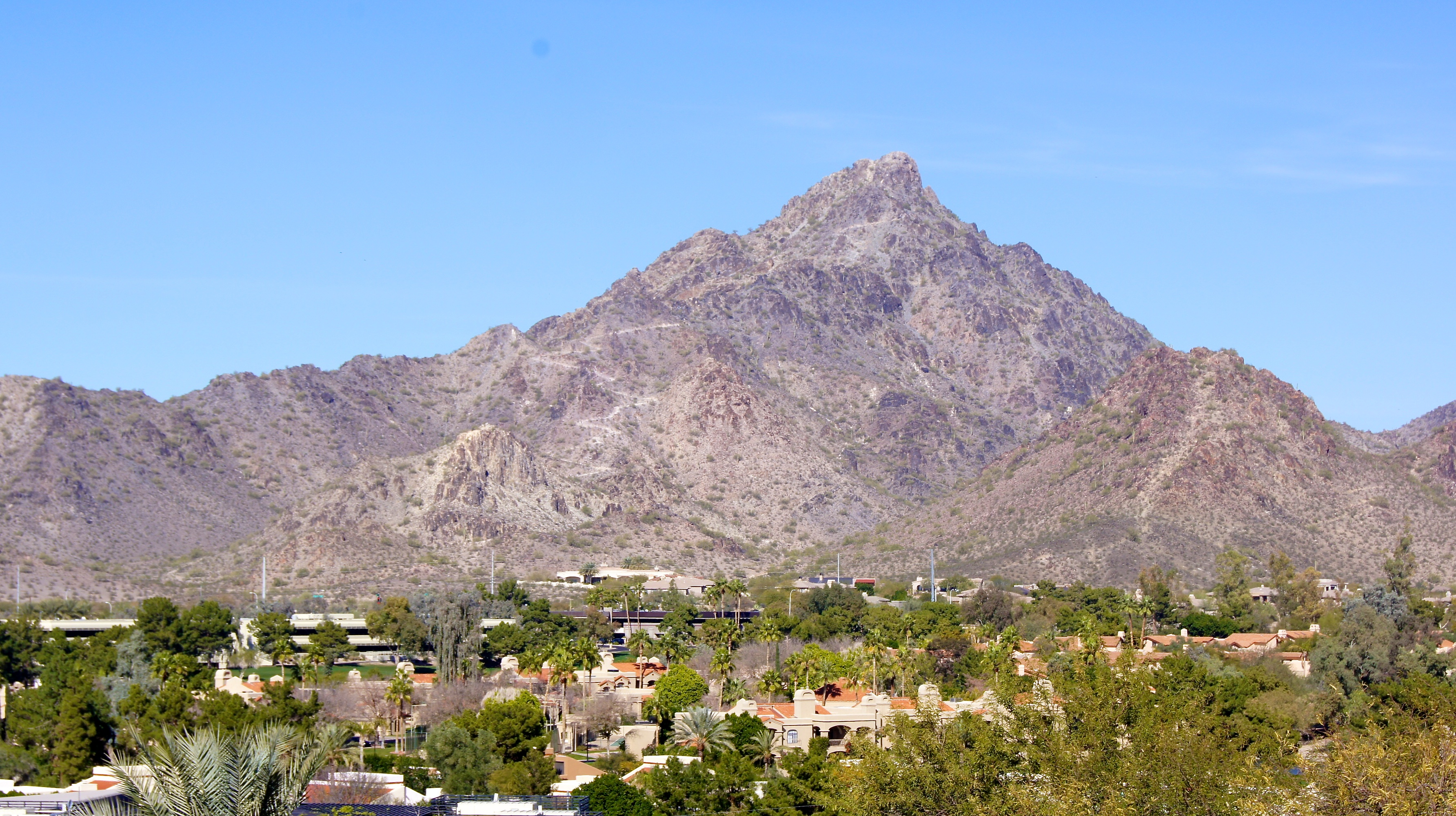
- Piestewa Peak viewed from Wrigley Mansion

Highest point
- Elevation: 2,610 ft (796 m) NAVD 88
- Prominence: 1,176 ft (358 m)
- Coordinates: 33°32′50″N 112°01′16″W

Geography
- Location within Maricopa County, Arizona Location within Arizona Location within the United States
- Location: Maricopa County, Arizona, U.S.
- Parent range: Phoenix Mountains
- Topo map: USGS Sunnyslope

Geology
- Rock age: Precambrian
- Mountain type: Schist

Climbing
- Easiest route: Walk up, class 1s3

Piestewa Peak (/paɪˈɛstəwɑː/ py-ES-tə-wah; O'odham: Vainom Do'ag, formerly Squaw Peak), at 2,610 feet (796 m) is the second highest point in the Phoenix Mountains, after Camelback Mountain, and the third highest in the city of Phoenix, Arizona. It is located in the Piestewa Peak Recreation Area within the Phoenix Mountain Preserve, near Piestewa Freeway (Arizona State Highway 51). Piestewa Peak is named in honor of Army Spc. Lori Ann Piestewa, the first known Native American woman to die in combat in the U.S. military, and the first female soldier to be killed in action in the 2003 Iraq War.

== Name ==
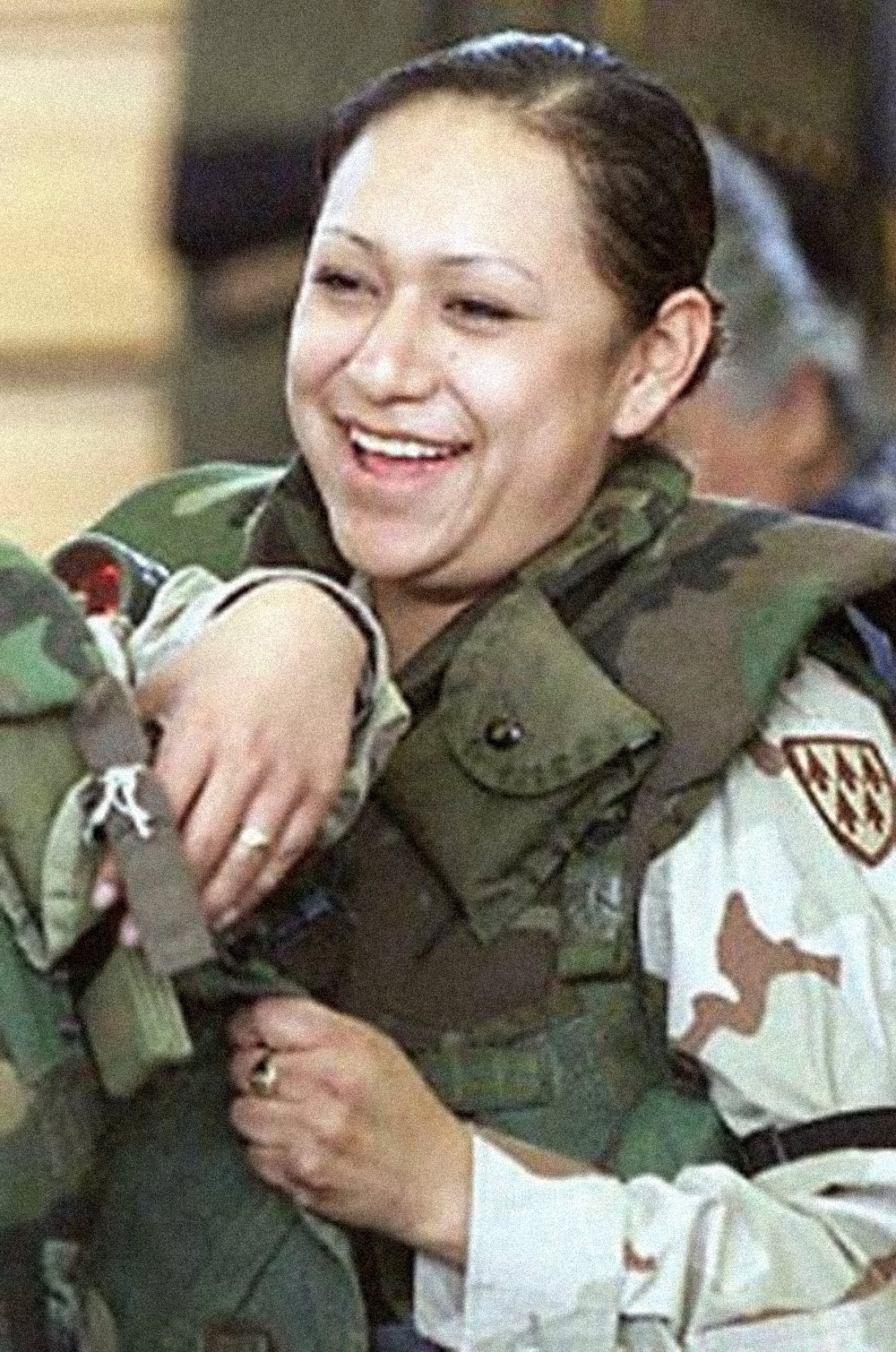
Lori Piestewa, namesake of the mountain

Since at least 1910, the name Squaw Peak had been used in reference to the mountain. Other historic names included Squaw Tit Mountain, Phoenix Mountain and Vainom Do'ag, the Pima name for the mountain. As the term "squaw" is considered derogatory by many, numerous efforts to change the name of the mountain were made through the years. State Representative Jack Jackson, himself a Navajo, submitted a bill to change the name annually beginning in 1992, which generated repeated and often raw debates in Arizona.

In 1997, the local youth group of the American Indian Movement filed a petition with the State Board on Geographic and Historic Names to change the name to Iron Mountain, the English translation of the mountain's native Pima name. The board researched the issue for nearly a year before ruling in July 1998 that too much doubt existed as to whether the name Vainom Do'ag actually referred to the mountain in question or another nearby peak and the petition was rejected, although the board left the door open to alternative possible name-changes.

U.S. Board on Geographic Names policy is to consider changes to features using the word "squaw" when approved by local authorities, but petitioners are strongly urged to choose new names that relate to Native American women and/or culture. In 2003, newly elected Governor Janet Napolitano petitioned the state board to rename the mountain for Lori Piestewa. The Governor's lobbying, while ultimately successful, proved to be controversial. The controversy stemmed in part from the fact that governor's request violated a required waiting period of five years after a person's death prior to renaming a geographic feature; Piestewa had been killed earlier that year while deployed on active military duty in Iraq. Tim Norton, a Phoenix police officer who at the time was serving as the director of the Arizona State Board on Geographic and Historic Names, refused to place the request on the board's agenda, citing the five-year requirement. Mario Diaz, an aide to Napolitano, subsequently contacted Norton's supervisor with the police department in an attempt to pressure Norton into changing his mind, but the supervisor refused, stating it was not a police department issue and was outside of his authority. Diaz' actions were picked up on by the press and resulted in strong criticism from both the public sector as well as fellow politicians, with some politicians considering a formal inquiry. Napolitano herself publicly admonished Diaz, but the controversy dogged Napolitano during her reelection campaign and throughout her tenure as governor.

The state board, absent its director, approved the name change to Piestewa Peak on April 17, 2003, less than a month after Piestewa's death. The U.S. Board on Geographic Names, however, refused to accept a similar petition at the time, citing their own five-year waiting rule. Five years later the board agreed to review the request as the waiting period had passed. The board also considered other potential alternatives, including Swilling Peak for area pioneer Jack Swilling. Ultimately, the national board voted 11–2 to approve the name change to Piestewa Peak, while indicating that the original name of Squaw Peak might still be used in publications as a secondary reference.

== Natural history ==
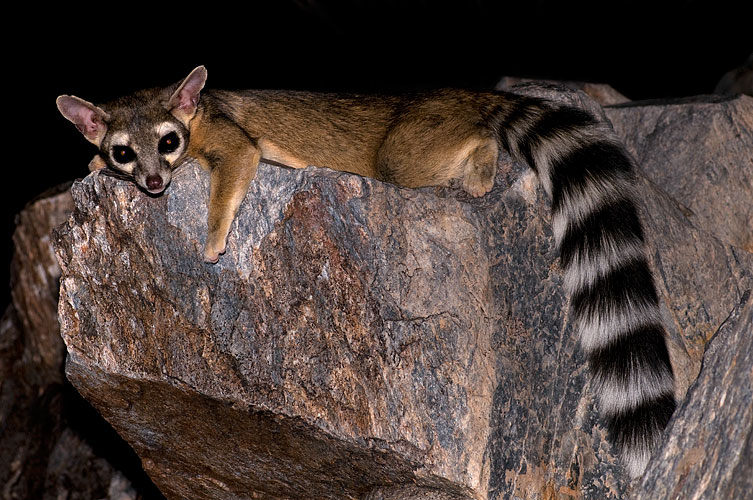
Ringtail at Piestewa Peak

As a landform, Piestewa Peak is relatively young, formed roughly 14 million years ago. However, it is composed of much older rock, primarily schist.

Flora in this area is typical of the lower Sonoran Desert and includes almost all varieties of Arizona cactus such as saguaro, barrel, hedgehog, pincushion, jumping cholla and prickly pear. Trees and colorful shrubbery include palo verde, mesquite, ironwood trees, creosote (dominate), ocotillo, brittle bush, desert lavender and giant sage shrubs.

Wildflowers are abundant in the early spring and include Mexican gold poppies (deep yellow), brittlebush (yellow), lupine (purples), desert globemallow (orange) and scorpionweed (purple). Fiddleneck and bladderpod also are blooming in some areas. These are in addition to the many varieties of flowering cacti.

Many species of reptiles thrive in the preserve, including gila monster, horned lizard, chuckwalla, and western diamondback rattlesnake. The mammal population includes coyote, bobcat, jackrabbit, cottontail rabbit, ground squirrel and kit fox. There are several species of birds that inhabit the preserve, including turkey vultures, mockingbirds, cactus wrens, Gambel's quail and several species of owls and hawks.

== Hiking ==
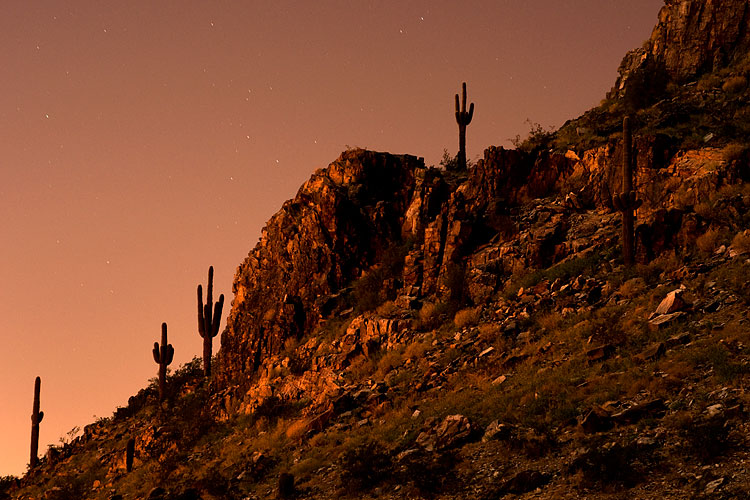
Along the Summit Trail

The Piestewa Peak Summit Trail (elevation gain = 1,208 feet (368 m) in 1.2 miles (1.9 km)), a National Recreation Trail, is climbed thousands of times per week by locals and visitors seeking a cardio-vascular workout, great views, or a family outing. However, quite a few hikers do not actually reach the top due to the fact that this trail is more difficult than it looks, especially in the summer when temperatures are well over 100 °F (40 °C). No water is available on the trail and dehydration is a common and serious problem with hikers who come unprepared. Water is only available at the trailhead, and at several ramadas along squaw peak road, uphill from the summit trail parking lot. Views from the summit include, in clear weather, Pinnacle Peak, the McDowell Mountains, Four Peaks, the Superstition Mountains, Tabletop Mountain, the Sierra Estrella, Woolsey Peak, the White Tank Mountains, the Harquahala Mountains, the Papago Mountains, the Hieroglyphic Mountains, and the Bradshaw Mountains.

The hike itself takes anywhere from 25 to 60 minutes in fair weather, depending on each hiker's capabilities (higher temperatures and sunny conditions may force the hiker to take up to twice as long). A beginning hiker should allow 60 minutes for a leisurely ascent and 40 for descent. The path is mostly well marked. There are 4 spots that are confusing and hikers who are not familiar with the path will be forced to look around for the designated route. There are a few sections that are technically difficult as they are steep and there are no guard rails.

There are approximately fifteen miles of interconnecting trails in the Preserve, ranging from easy to difficult. There are several differences in regulation between the Piestewa Peak summit trail and the rest of the interconnected Phoenix mountain preserve trail system. The greater trail system allows horseback riding, biking, and foot traffic, including dogs. Piestewa peak summit trail allows foot traffic only: no bicycles, dogs, or horses. The greater trail system is generally open to the public from sunrise to sunset. Piestewa peak (summit trail only) is open from sunrise until 11:00 PM. This unique late availability combined with proximity to city lights, and a light-colored rock translates to a popular location for night hikes.

== See also ==
- Squaw Peak Inn – historic inn near the mountain
