= Crown Canyon =

Coordinates: 33.5417°N 111.9955°W

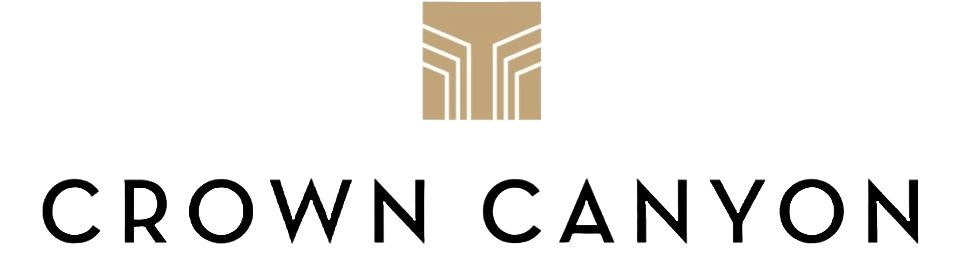
- Company type: Private
- Founder: Kevin Groman
- Headquarters: Paradise Valley, Arizona, U.S.
- Website: www.crowncanyon.com

Crown Canyon is a planned residential community located in Paradise Valley, Arizona. It is considered as one of the most expensive communities in Arizona. The project is a joint venture between BedBrock Development and Crown Canyon Capital.

== History ==
Kevin Groman, the founder of Crown Canyon Capital, acquired the land in Phoenix Mountain Preserve for the development of the community called Crown Canyon. After acquiring the land, Groman contracted Rich Brock and his company, BedBrock Developers, to construct the homes.

== Architecture ==
The homes in Crown Canyon have been designed in the Sonoran Contemporary style, influenced by Frank Lloyd Wright's Prairie-style architecture.

Within Crown Canyon, the site known as Amethyst includes an 18,000-square-foot residence.
