= Carpenter 1 Fire =

2013 wildfire in Nevada, United States

Carpenter 1 fire
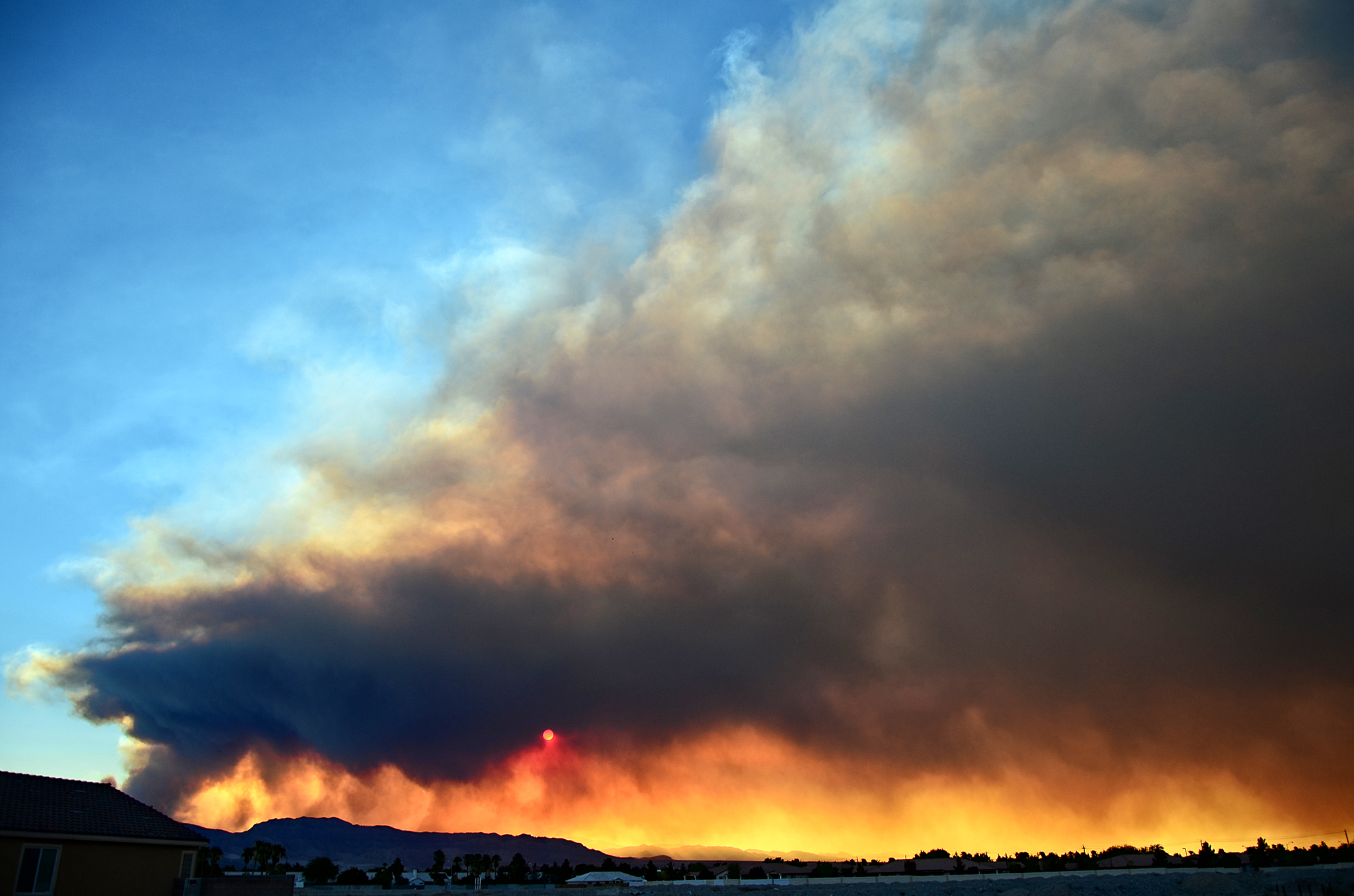
- Spring Mountains, Mount Charleston Fire, July 8, 2013
- Date: July 1, 2013 – August 18, 2013
- Location: Mount Charleston, Nevada, U.S.

Statistics
- Burned area: 28,000 acres (11,000 ha)

Impacts
- Deaths: 0
- Structures lost: 6

Ignition
- Cause: Lightning

The Carpenter 1 Fire was a large wildfire on Mount Charleston, 25 miles (40 km) northwest of Las Vegas, Nevada. The fire began on July 1, 2013, near Pahrump, Nevada, before spreading eastward. Carpenter 1 was seen for miles across the Las Vegas metropolitan area, and was the largest fire to occur on Mount Charleston in decades.

== Containment ==
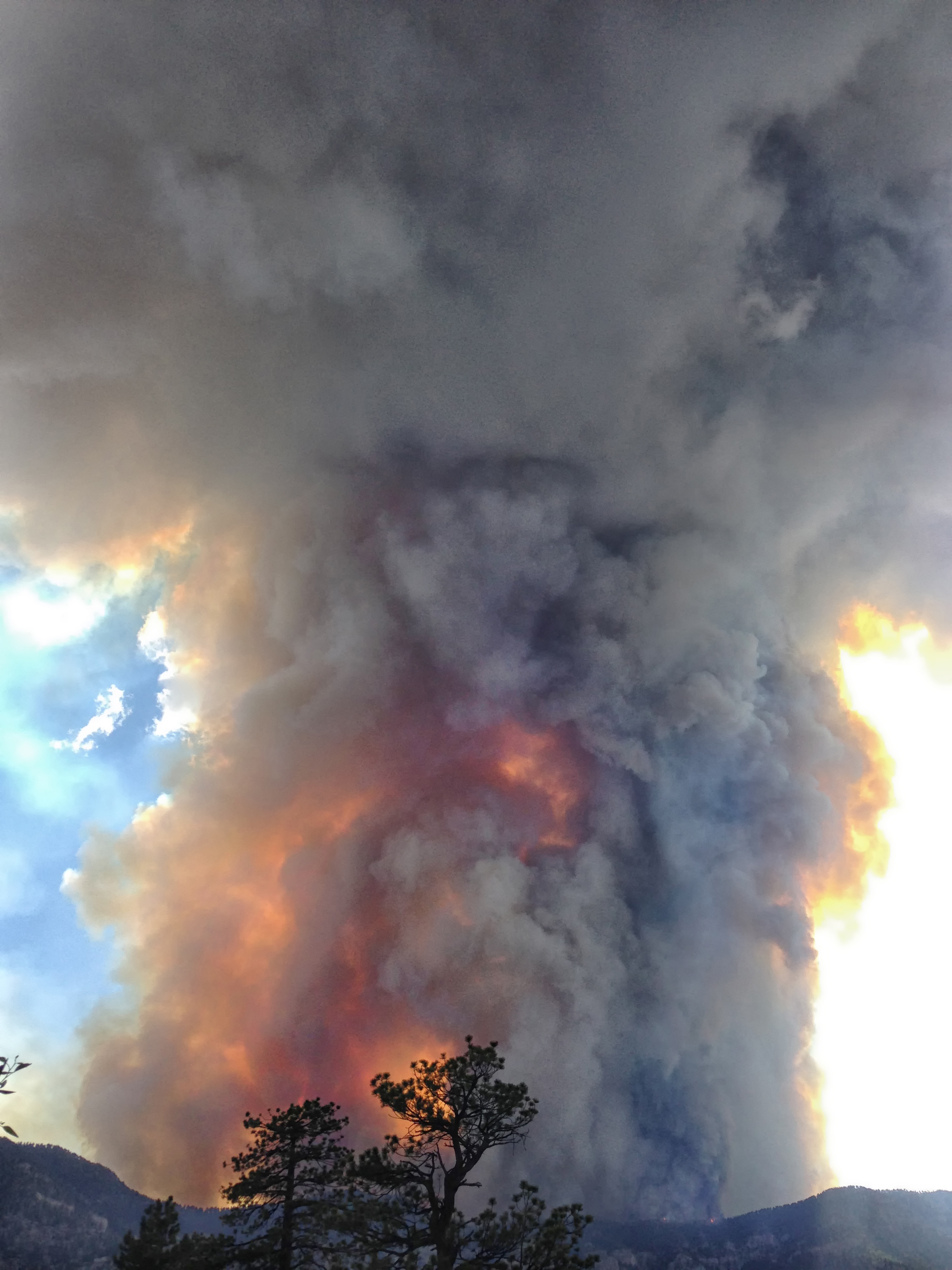
Close Image of Carpenter 1 Fire

After eight weeks of battling the fire, Carpenter 1 was fully contained on August 18, 2013. The fire consumed nearly 28,000 acres (11,000 ha), causing parts of Nevada State Route 156 and 157 to be closed. This resulted in the evacuation of residents and closure of businesses and portions of the Spring Mountains National Recreation Area.

The fire, stretching between 5,000–11,000 feet (1,500–3,400 m) elevations, was fought by hundreds of firefighters and eight hotshot crews, as well as helicopters, fire engines, water tenders, and a DC-10 tanker plane.

According to the National Interagency Fire Center, the Carpenter 1 fire was considered "the highest ranked priority fire in the nation" at the time of its occurrence. Evidence of the damage can still be seen on the South Loop Trail to Charleston Peak.

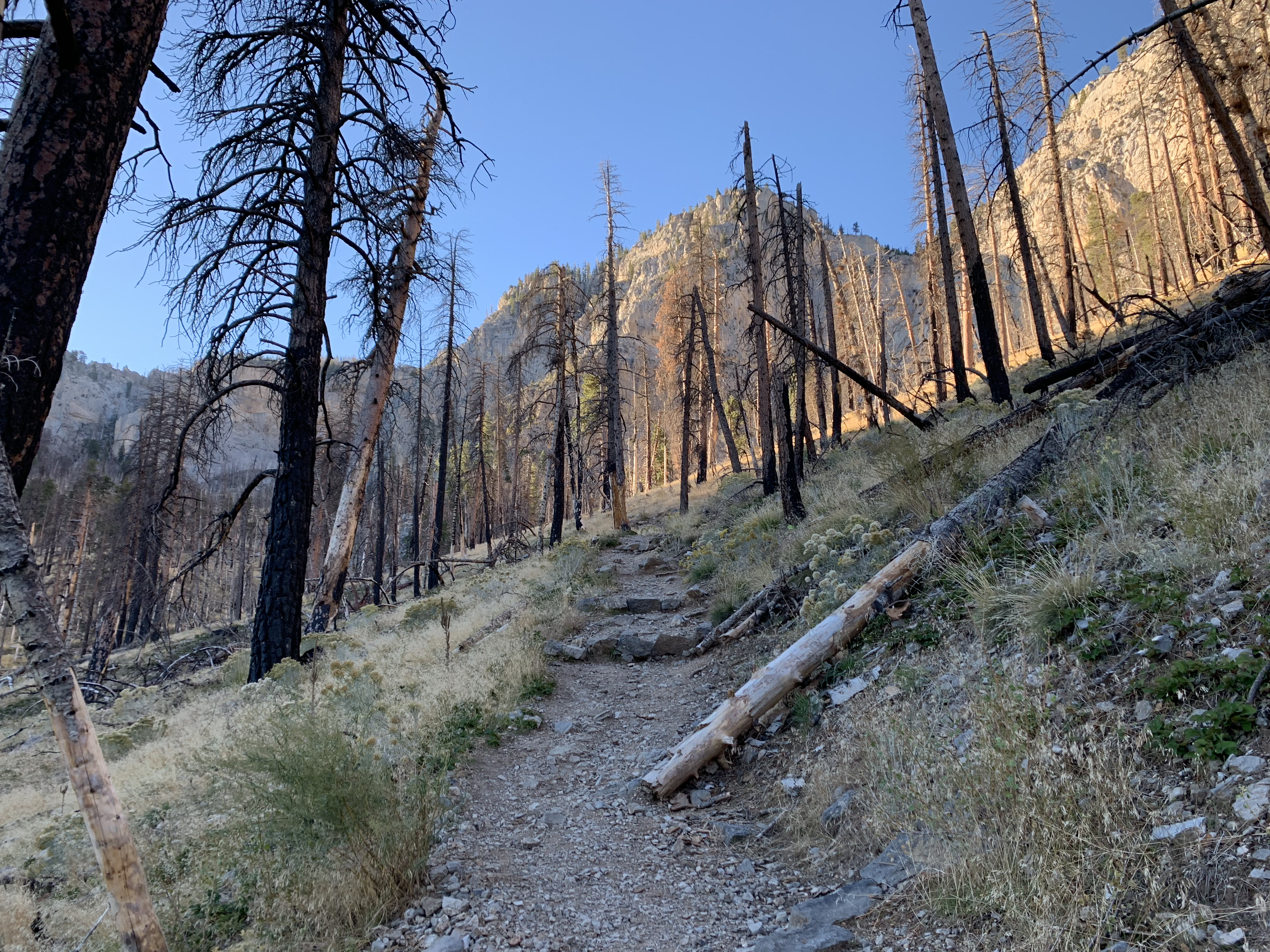
Burned trees from the Carpenter 1 fire on the South Loop Trail to Charleston Peak outside of the Cathedral Rock Picnic Area, in the Spring Mountains National Recreation Area.

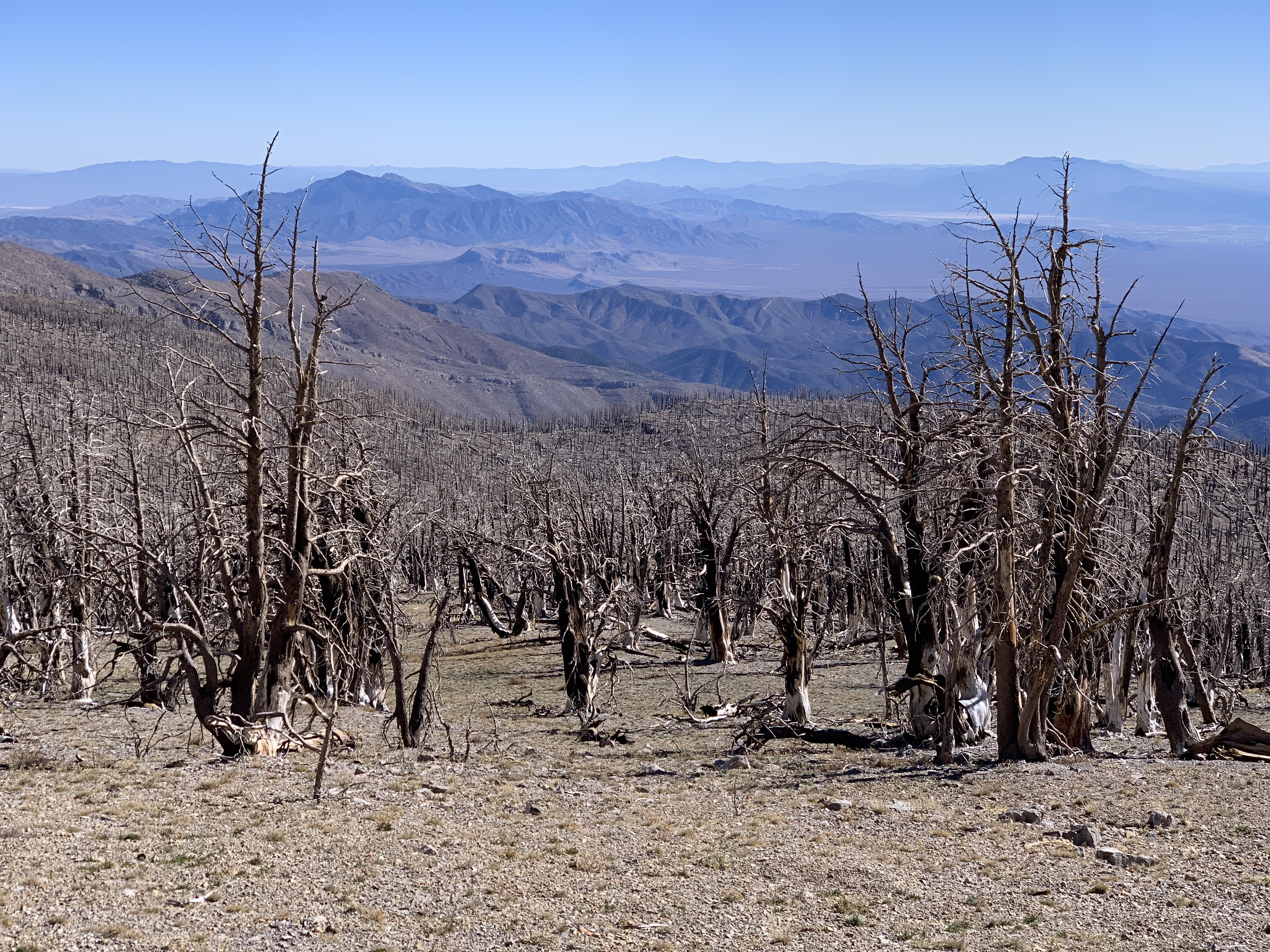
Burned trees from the Carpenter 1 fire on the upper slopes of the South Loop Trail to Charleston Peak.

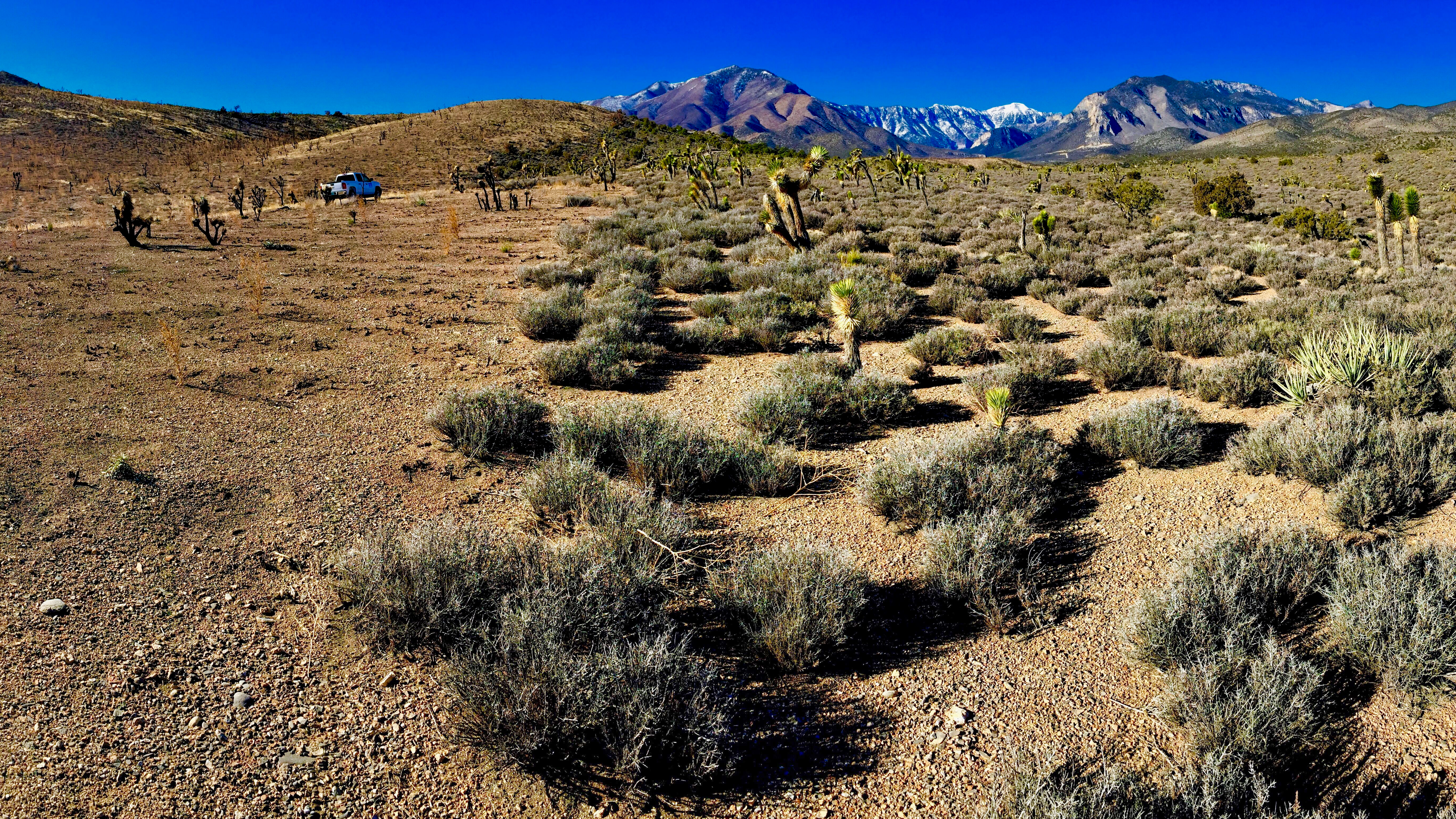
Boundary of the Carpenter One Fire in January 2015
