= Mummy Mountain (Arizona) =

Landform in Maricopa County, Arizona

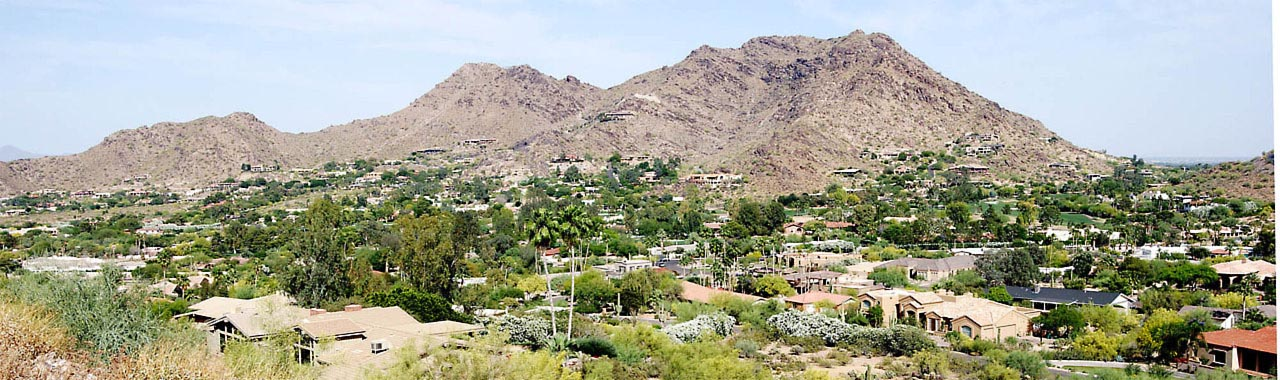
- Mummy Mountain

Highest point
- Elevation: 2,260 ft (689 m)
- Prominence: 820 ft (250 m)
- Coordinates: 33°32′37″N 111°57′38″W

Geography
- Location within Arizona
- Location: Maricopa County, Arizona, U.S.
- Topo map: USGS Paradise Valley

Mummy Mountain is a mountain situated in Paradise Valley, Arizona, United States. The slopes of the mountain incorporate primarily suburban residential development while the upper summit areas are conservation sites. Camelback Inn has been located on the southern slope since 1936. As the only part of the Phoenix Mountains not held within the Phoenix Mountain Preserve, portions of Mummy Mountain are protected by the Mummy Mountain Preserve Trust and the town of Paradise Valley.

== Name ==
The formation originally was known as Windy Gulch and Horseshoe Mountain but was later renamed by miner and businessman Charles Mieg, who purchased most of the property in the 1940s for $12,000. He observed that the mountain's profile resembled an Egyptian mummy lying down. When he began selling parcels for development, Mieg marketed the land using the name Mummy Mountain.

== Conservation ==
The Mummy Mountain Preserve Trust is a 501 (c)(3) charitable trust established in 1997 to preserve the natural landscape of approximately 320 acres (1.3 km^{2}) along the mountain ridge. Local celebrities including Marshall Trimble, Joe Garagiola, Clive Cussler and Bil Keane supported a campaign asking property owners for donations of land. Through private donations and transfer of public land from Maricopa County, 218 acres (0.88 km^{2}) were controlled by the trust by August 1999.
