= Phoenix Mountains =

Mountain range in the Southwestern United States

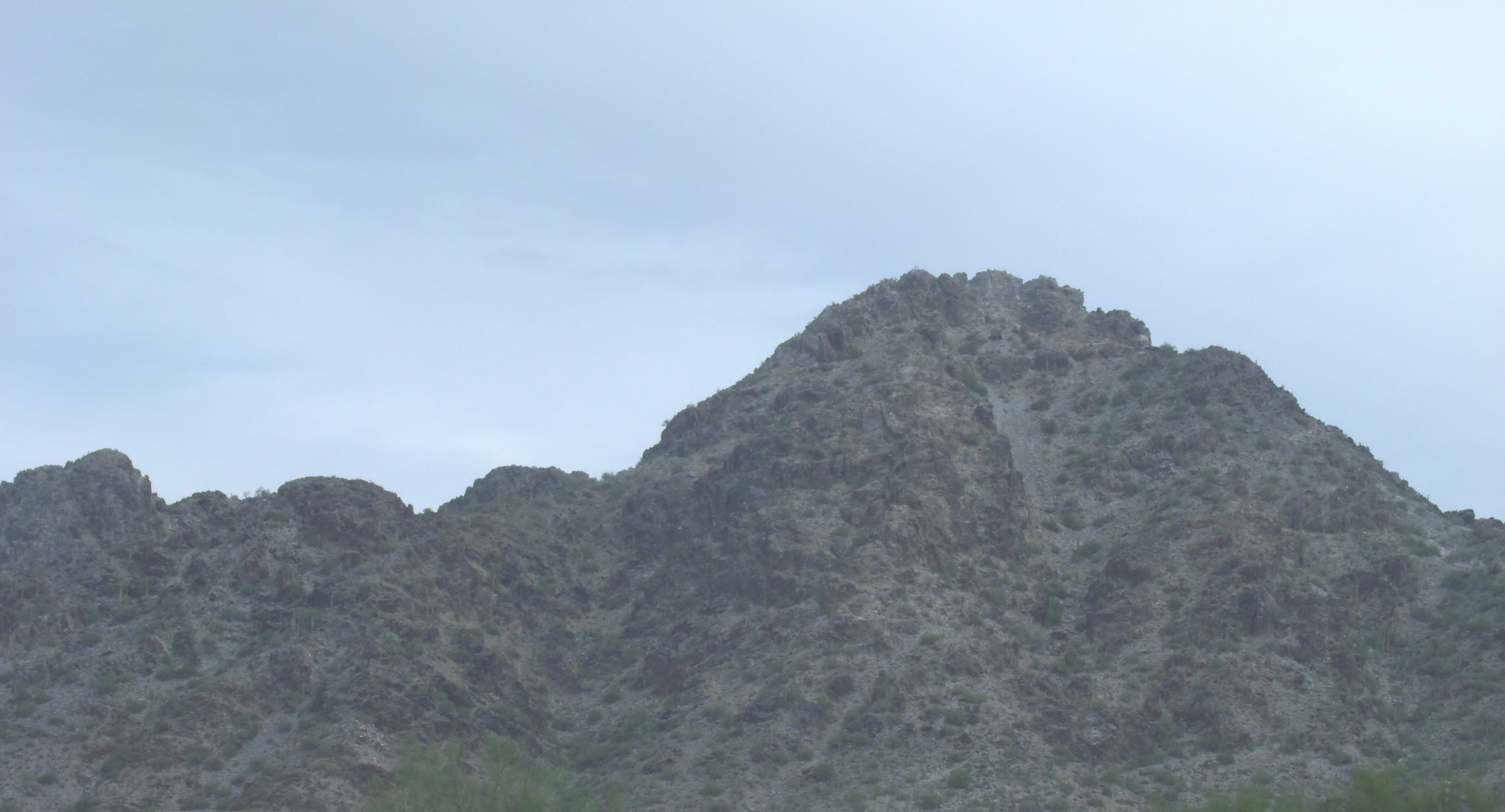
- View of the Phoenix Mountains, looking north

Highest point
- Peak: Camelback Mountain
- Elevation: 2,546 ft (776 m)
- Coordinates: 33°32′51″N 112°01′15″W

Dimensions
- Length: 10 mi (16 km)

Geography
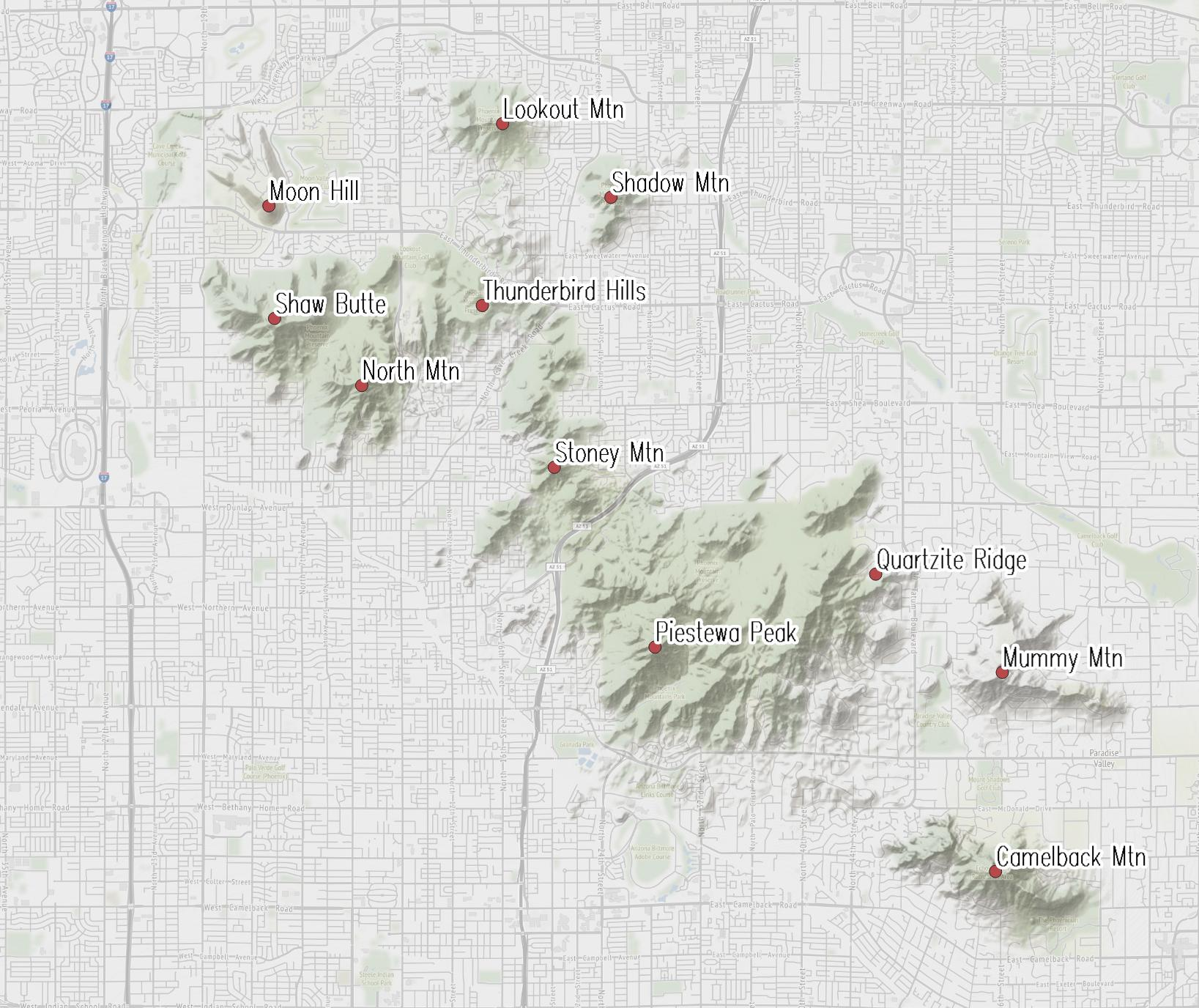
- Country: United States

Geology
- Orogeny: Mazatzal
- Rock age: Paleozoic–Neogene

The Phoenix Mountains are a mountain range located in central Phoenix, Arizona. With the exception of Mummy Mountain, they are part of the Phoenix Mountain Preserve. They serve as a municipal park and offer hiking, mountain biking and equestrian trails at a variety of different access points.

== Peaks ==
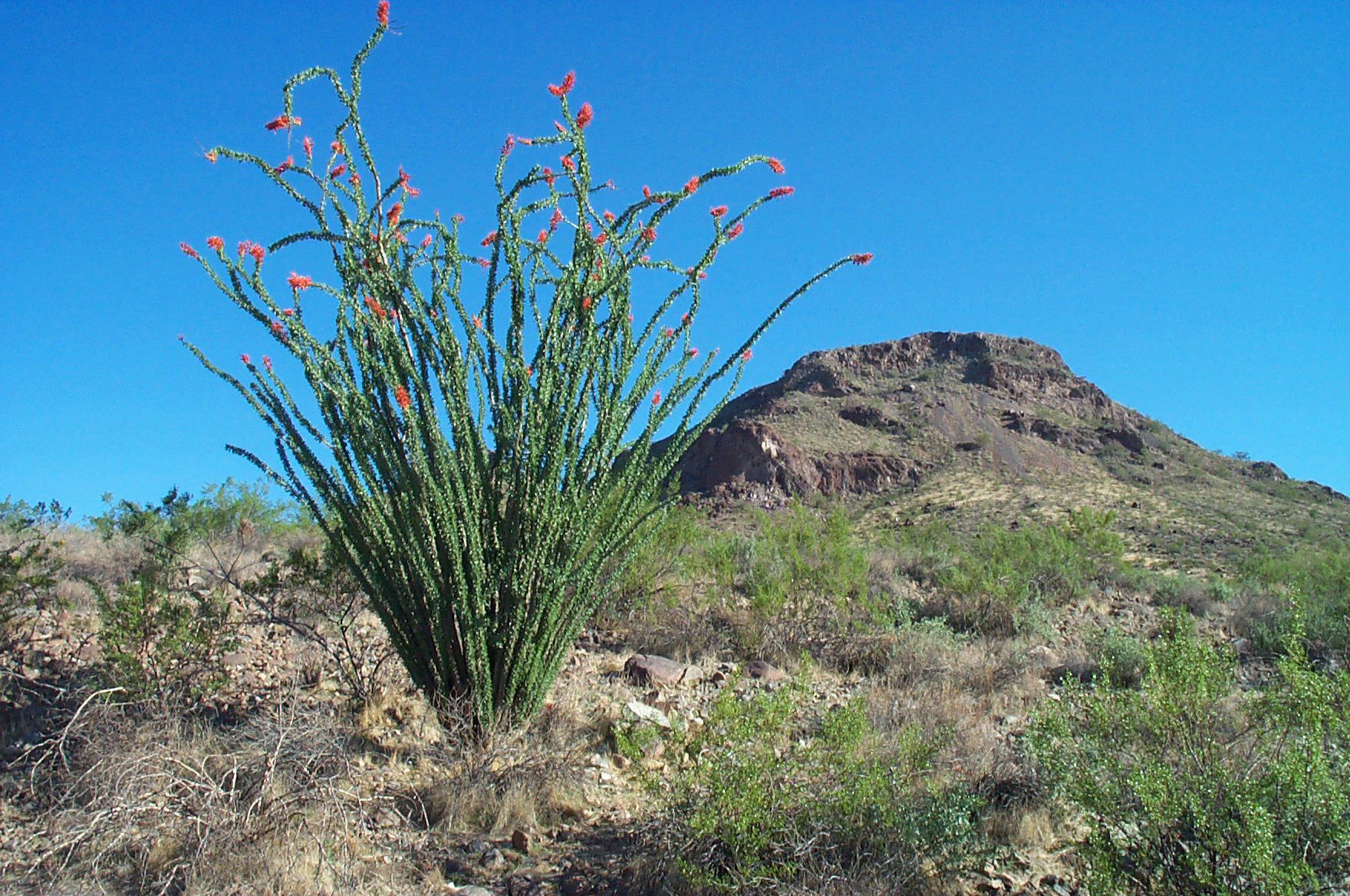
Ocotillo below Lookout Mountain, Phoenix

The major peaks of the Phoenix Mountain complex are:

- Moon Mountain
- Lookout Mountain
- Shadow Mountain
- Shaw Butte
- North Mountain
- Echo Mountain
- Stony Mountain
- South Mountain
- Piestewa Peak (formerly named Squaw Peak)
- Mummy Mountain
- Camelback Mountain
- Sunnyslope Mountain

== Geology ==
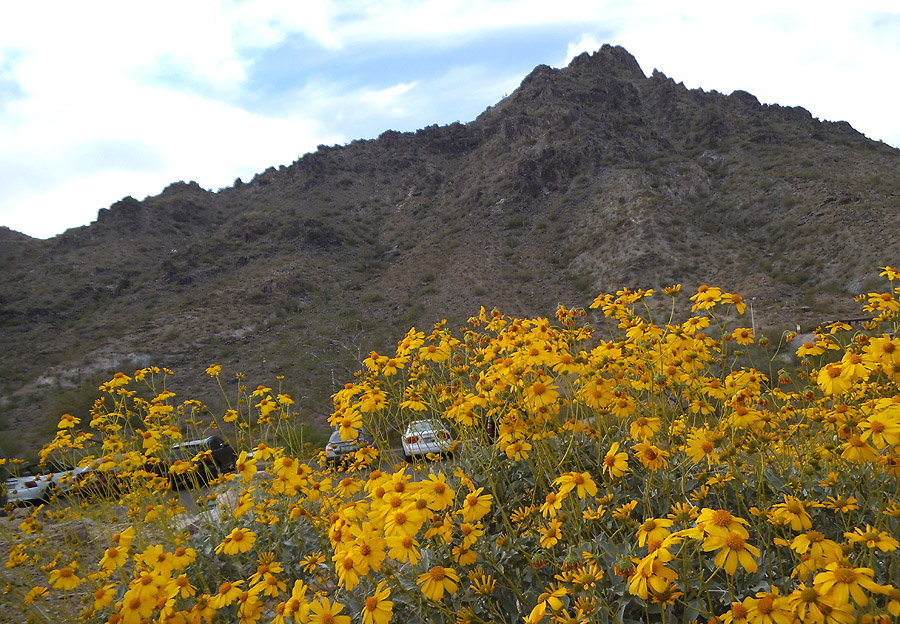
Brittlebush blooming near the base of Piestewa Peak

The nearly 1.7 billion year (1.7 Gya) history of the formation of the Phoenix Mountains is defined by distinctive episodes intensive submarine volcanism and orogeny in the Proterozoic, erosion in the Mesozoic, and lastly, Basin and Range development.

Generally speaking, the entire Phoenix Mountain structure is an exposed remnant of northeast-striking Proterozoic low-grade metamorphic rock that is thought to be nearly 12-km thick. The first deposits from 1.7 Gya were in an oceanic volcanic arc setting which gradually changed to sub-aerial volcanic and near-shore deposits. This large section of crust was subjected to long scale crustal shortening during the Mazatzal orogeny which formed isoclinal folds and shear zones. North Mountain and Shaw Butte, which are composed of fine to medium grained greenstone and intruded granodiorite respectively, are the oldest mountain exposures in the area. Moving southeast the mountains become increasingly younger in geologic age. Stoney Mountain is also composed of similar greenstone. The Arizona State Route 51, near Dreamy Draw, exposes rock that has distinctly slaty cleavage or schistosity which is characteristic of gray metasedimentary phyllite. Piestewa Peak is part of a larger synclinal fold of conglomeratic and cross-bedded quartzite and volcaniclastic rocks that extend toward Quartzite Ridge. No geologic record is retained in the Phoenix area regarding what happened between the Proterozoic until the Late Tertiary sedimentary deposits that exist such as the upper portion of Camelback Mountain (which is an Oligocene aged red sandstone). This contact is known as an angular unconformity. The mountains of Lookout Mountain and the Moon Hill areas are formed from thick sequences of basaltic lava and conglomerate. This period of wide-scale volcanism and tectonic activity evidences how active Basin and Range development was roughly 20 million years ago. The Basin and Range extension which pulled the crust in the ancient Phoenix area helped to form the parallel mountain ranges seen throughout the Southwest.

== Other features ==
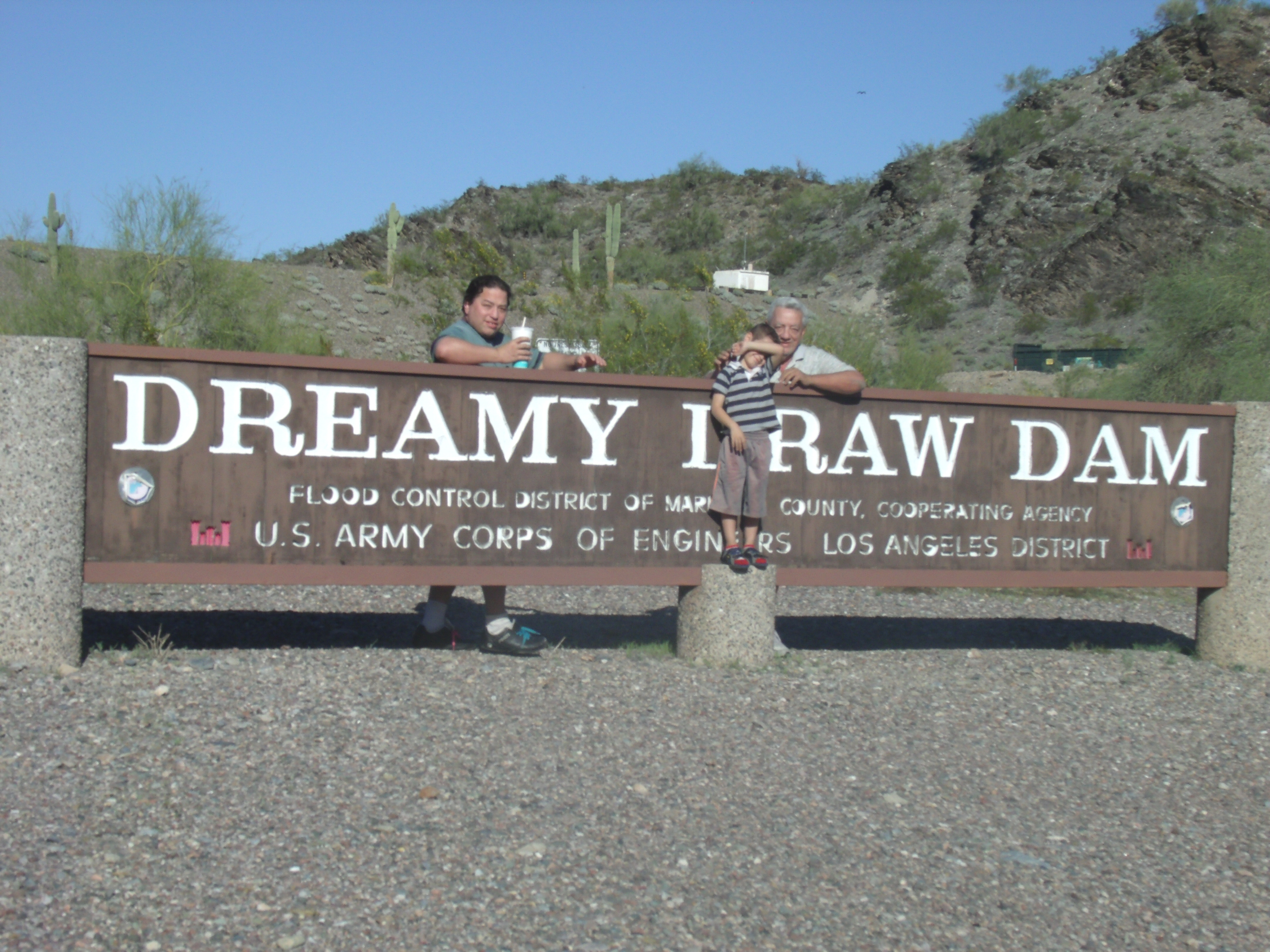
Dreamy Draw Dam According to local legend Dreamy Draw Dam is supposedly a UFO crash site where in 1947 the Army Corps. of Eng. used rock to cover up the crash site.

The mountains contain the Phoenix Mountain Preserve, which includes the Dreamy Draw Recreation Area, Lookout Mountain Preserve, North Mountain Preserve and Piestewa Mountain Park.

The Dreamy Draw Recreation Area is located in the pass between the Stoney/Echo mountain ridge and Piestewa Peak known as Dreamy Draw. The name originated from the neurological effects suffered by miners who worked the area's cinnabar (mercury sulfide) mine. There is a flood prevention dam in the Dreamy Draw area.

== Trails ==
=== Charles M. Christiansen Memorial Trail ===
The trail was dedicated in 1986 to Charles Milo Christiansen, the former director of Phoenix Parks and Recreation who led efforts to preserve the Phoenix Mountains. There is a memorial plaque at the western trailhead at Mountain View Park. The trail is 10.7 miles (17.2 km) long and has a total elevation gain of 200', though the elevations at both trailheads are the same. It connects North Mountain Park with Stony Mountain and Piestewa Peak Park.
