= Mount Charleston =

Mountain in Nevada, United States

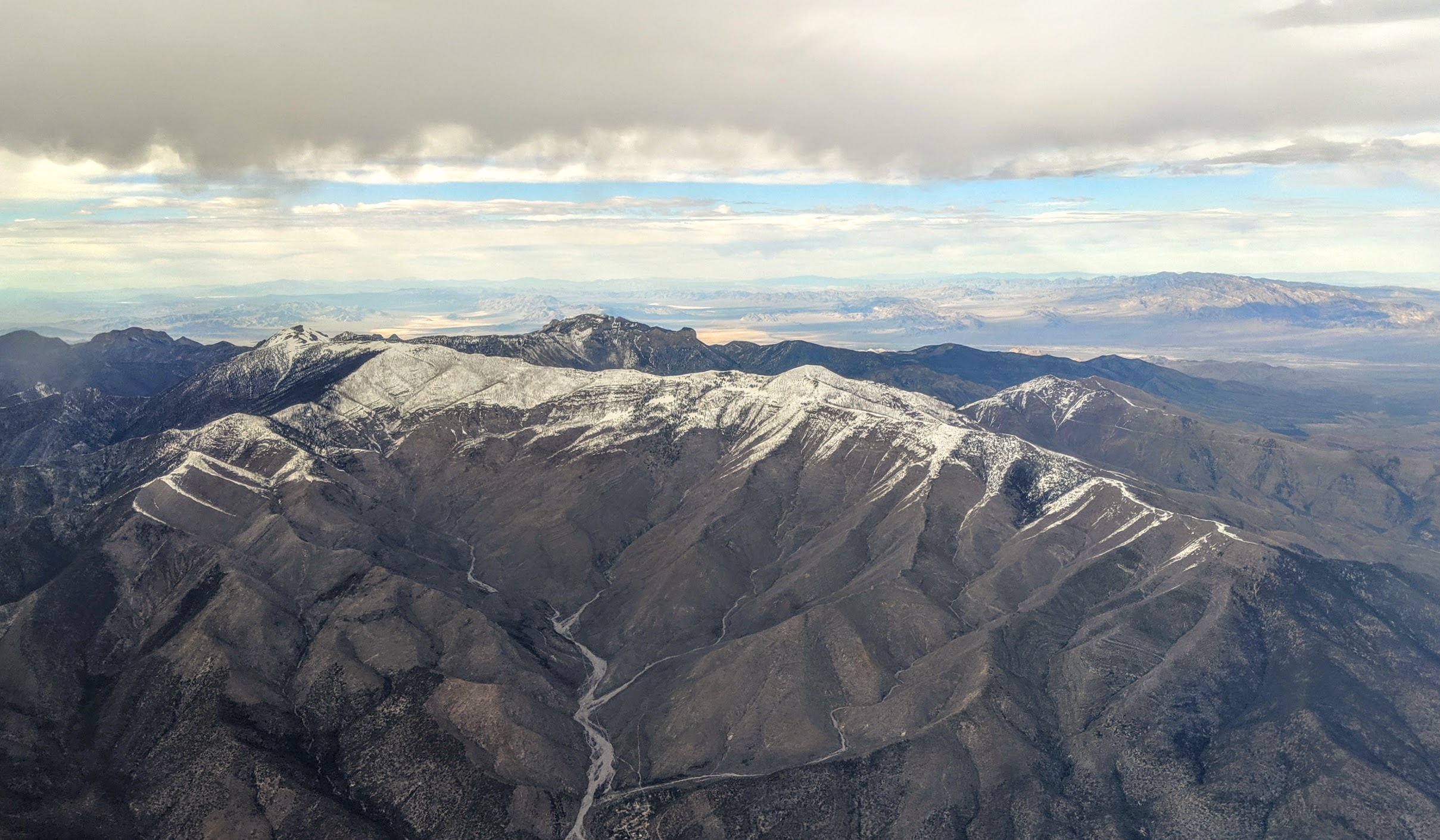
- Mount Charleston, with Trout Canyon in the foreground, Charleston peak at left rear

Highest point
- Elevation: 11,916 ft (3,632 m)
- Parent peak: Mount Jefferson
- Listing: North America prominent peaks 34th; North America isolated peaks 93rd; Nevada county high points 4th; DPS Emblem Peak; Great Basin Peaks List Star Peak
- Coordinates: 36°16′18″N 115°41′44″W

Geography
- Location within Nevada
- Location: Clark County, Nevada, U.S.
- Parent range: Spring Mountains
- Topo map: USGS Charleston Peak

Climbing
- Easiest route: Trail hike, class 1

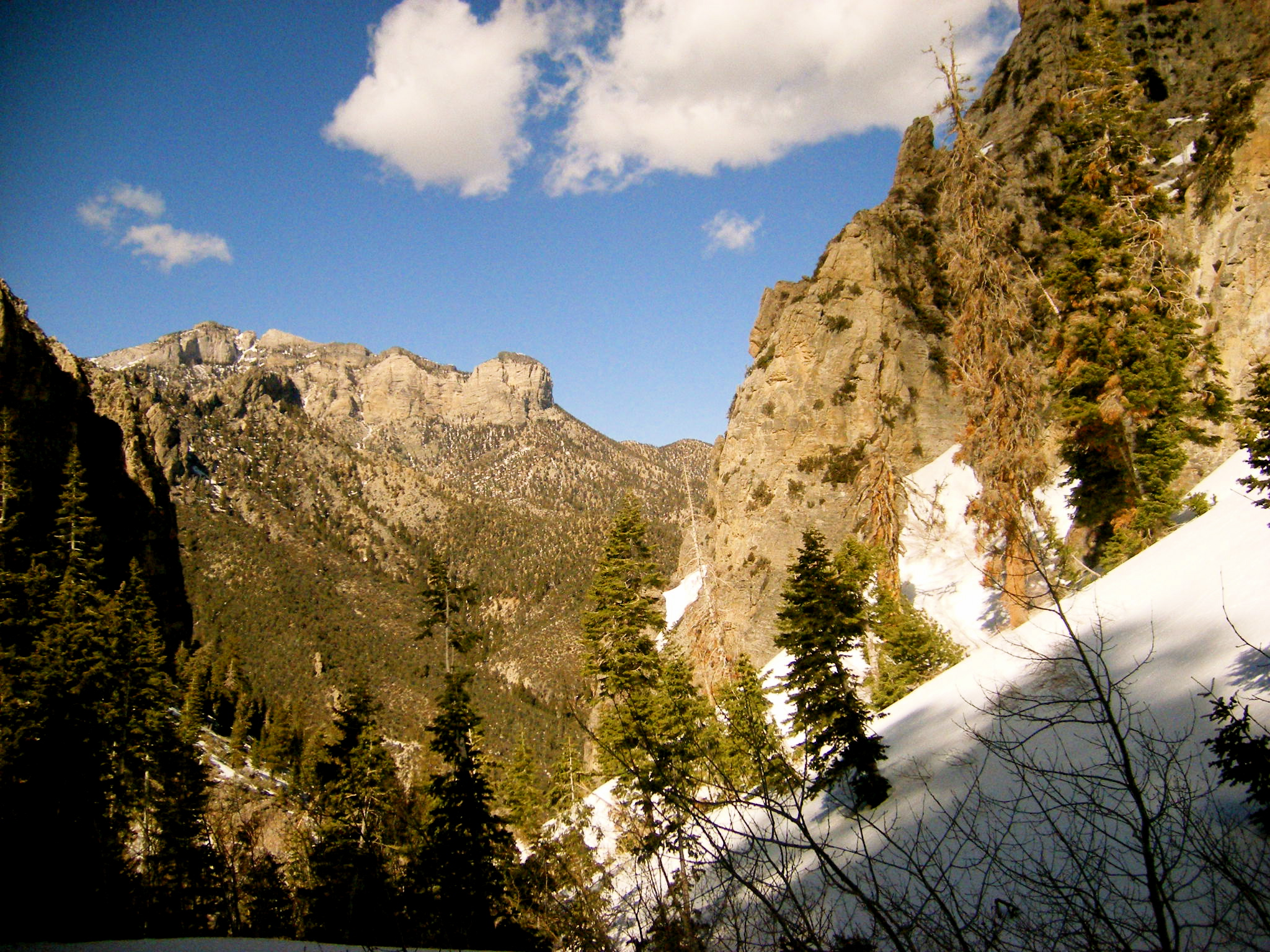
View of Mummy Mountain from Cathedral Rock trail

Mount Charleston, including Charleston Peak (Nuvagantu, literally "where snow sits", in Southern Paiute or Nüpakatütün in Shoshoni) at 11,916 feet (3,632 m), is the highest mountain in both the Spring Mountains and Clark County, in Nevada, United States. It is the eighth-highest mountain in the state. Well separated from higher peaks by large, low basins, Charleston Peak is the most topographically prominent peak in Nevada, and the eighth-most-prominent peak in the contiguous United States. It is one of eight ultra-prominent peaks in Nevada. It is located about 35 miles (56 km) northwest of Las Vegas within the Mount Charleston Wilderness, which is within the Spring Mountains National Recreation Area of the Humboldt–Toiyabe National Forest.

== Overview ==
Mount Charleston is a year-round getaway for Las Vegas's residents and visitors, with a number of hiking trails, a modest ski area, a hotel and a small restaurant. The mountain, which is snow-capped more than half the year, can be seen from parts of the Las Vegas Strip when looking toward the west. Mount Charleston has nearly 200 camp sites and over 150 picnic areas, some of which are RV-accessible.

The village of Mount Charleston, Nevada, lies at its base to the east.

The state of Nevada issues license plates with the caption "Mt. Charleston" and an image of the peak in the background. Sales of the plate supports the natural environment of the Mount Charleston area through grants administered by the Nevada Division of State Lands.

According to the Federal Writers' Project, Mount Charleston was named for Charleston, South Carolina by Southerners.

== Climate ==
Climate data for Mount Charleston 36.2677 N, 115.6984 W, Elevation: 11,148 ft (3,398 m) (1991–2020 normals)
Month	Jan	Feb	Mar	Apr	May	Jun	Jul	Aug	Sep	Oct	Nov	Dec	Year
Mean daily maximum °F (°C)	32.9 (0.5)	31.9 (−0.1)	35.2 (1.8)	40.4 (4.7)	49.1 (9.5)	60.5 (15.8)	66.6 (19.2)	65.1 (18.4)	59.0 (15.0)	49.3 (9.6)	39.6 (4.2)	32.9 (0.5)	46.9 (8.3)
Daily mean °F (°C)	23.0 (−5.0)	21.4 (−5.9)	24.4 (−4.2)	28.4 (−2.0)	36.4 (2.4)	46.6 (8.1)	52.9 (11.6)	51.7 (10.9)	45.8 (7.7)	37.0 (2.8)	29.0 (−1.7)	23.1 (−4.9)	35.0 (1.6)
Mean daily minimum °F (°C)	13.2 (−10.4)	11.0 (−11.7)	13.6 (−10.2)	16.4 (−8.7)	23.6 (−4.7)	32.7 (0.4)	39.3 (4.1)	38.4 (3.6)	32.5 (0.3)	24.6 (−4.1)	18.5 (−7.5)	13.4 (−10.3)	23.1 (−4.9)
Average precipitation inches (mm)	3.51 (89)	3.76 (96)	3.31 (84)	1.29 (33)	1.00 (25)	0.32 (8.1)	2.24 (57)	2.02 (51)	1.79 (45)	1.93 (49)	1.69 (43)	2.96 (75)	25.82 (655.1)
Source: PRISM Climate Group

== Plane crash ==
Near its summit are the remnants of the 1955 crash of a CIA C-54 Military Air Transport Service plane. The plane was on route on November 17, 1955, from Burbank (location of Lockheed's Skunkworks), to Groom Lake (Area 51) (then known as Watertown Strip) to work on the secret U-2 plane development. Fourteen men (a mix of military staffers and civilian subcontractors, engineers, and technicians) were on board when it crashed during a blizzard, all of whom died. There are still remains from the plane that can be hiked to just off the main southern loop trail to the peak.

The Silent Heroes of the Cold War Memorial was installed at the Spring Mountains Visitor Gateway in 2015. It features a propeller from the downed aircraft (which was recovered decades later from the crash site) and a granite monument.

== Hiking ==
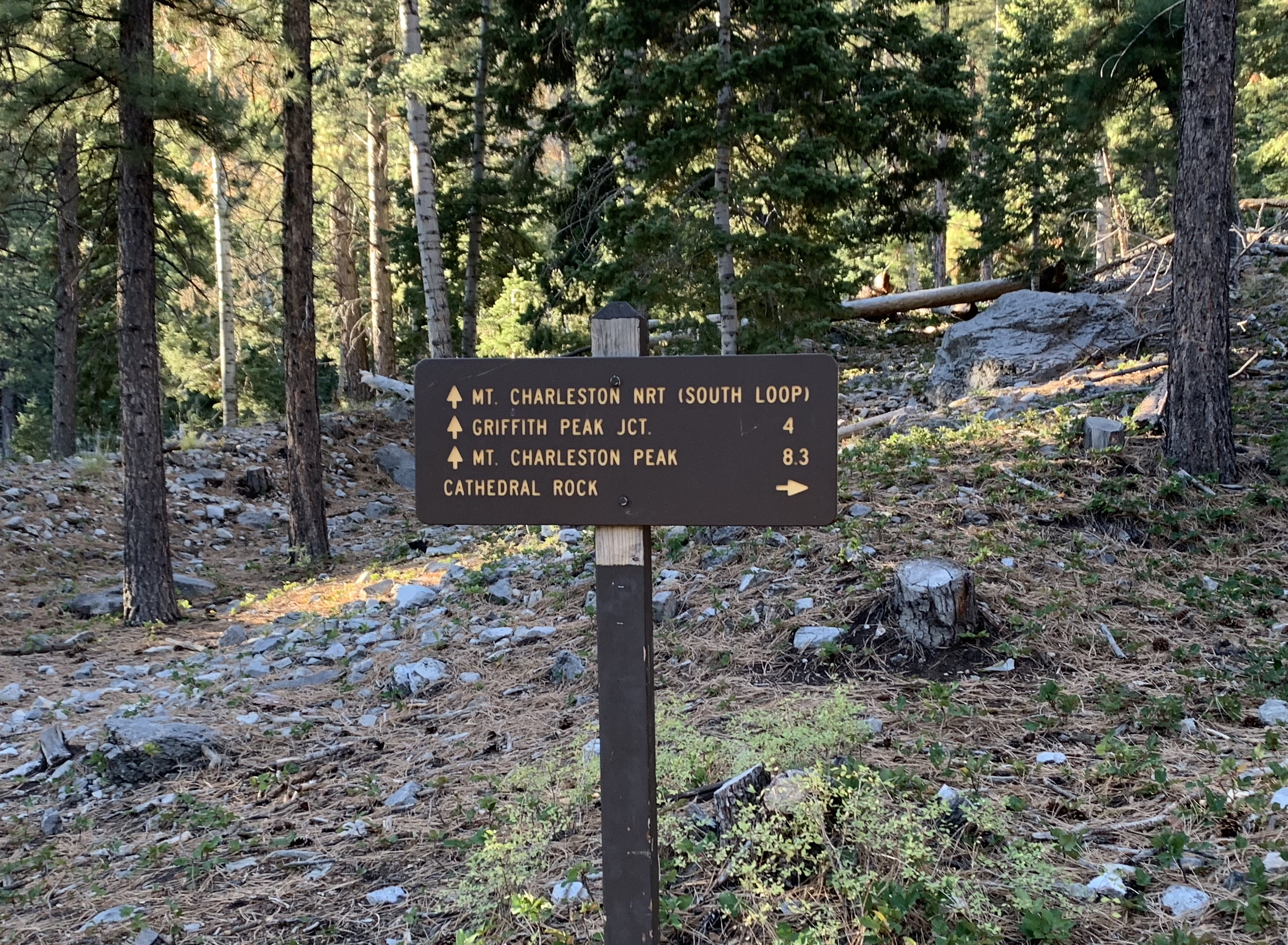
The start of the South Loop Trail to Charleston Peak

Charleston Peak is a popular destination for hikers. The summit offers panoramic views of the Sierra Nevada range, Death Valley, and Las Vegas. There are two well-marked and well-maintained trails to the summit: South Loop Trail and North Loop Trail. The trails can be done on their own as an out-and-back hike, or combined as a loop. Both approaches involve a strenuous 16-mile+ round trip with over 4000 feet of climbing. The hike often takes all day. The hike is most accessible in the snow-free months of summer and fall.

== See also ==
- List of Ultras of the United States
- Carpenter 1 Fire
- Mahogany Fire
