= Squaw Peak Inn =

- U.S. National Register of Historic Places
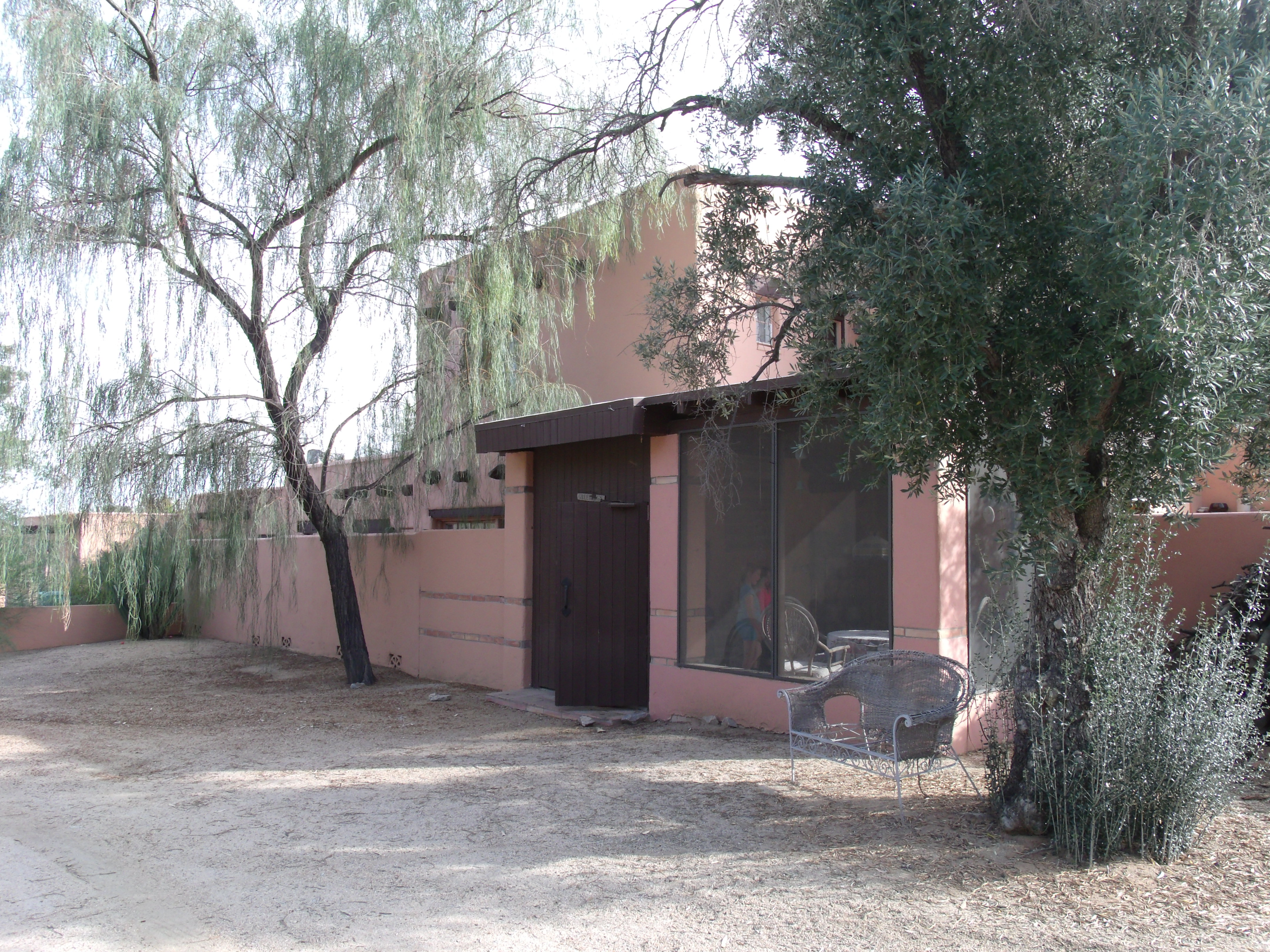
- Front view of the Squaw Peak Inn

- Location within Arizona Location within the United States
- Location: 4425 E. Horseshoe Road, Phoenix, Arizona
- Coordinates: 33°32′50″N 112°01′16″W
- Built: 1937
- Built by: Malcom D. Seashore
- NRHP reference No.: 96000760
- Added to NRHP: January 12, 1995

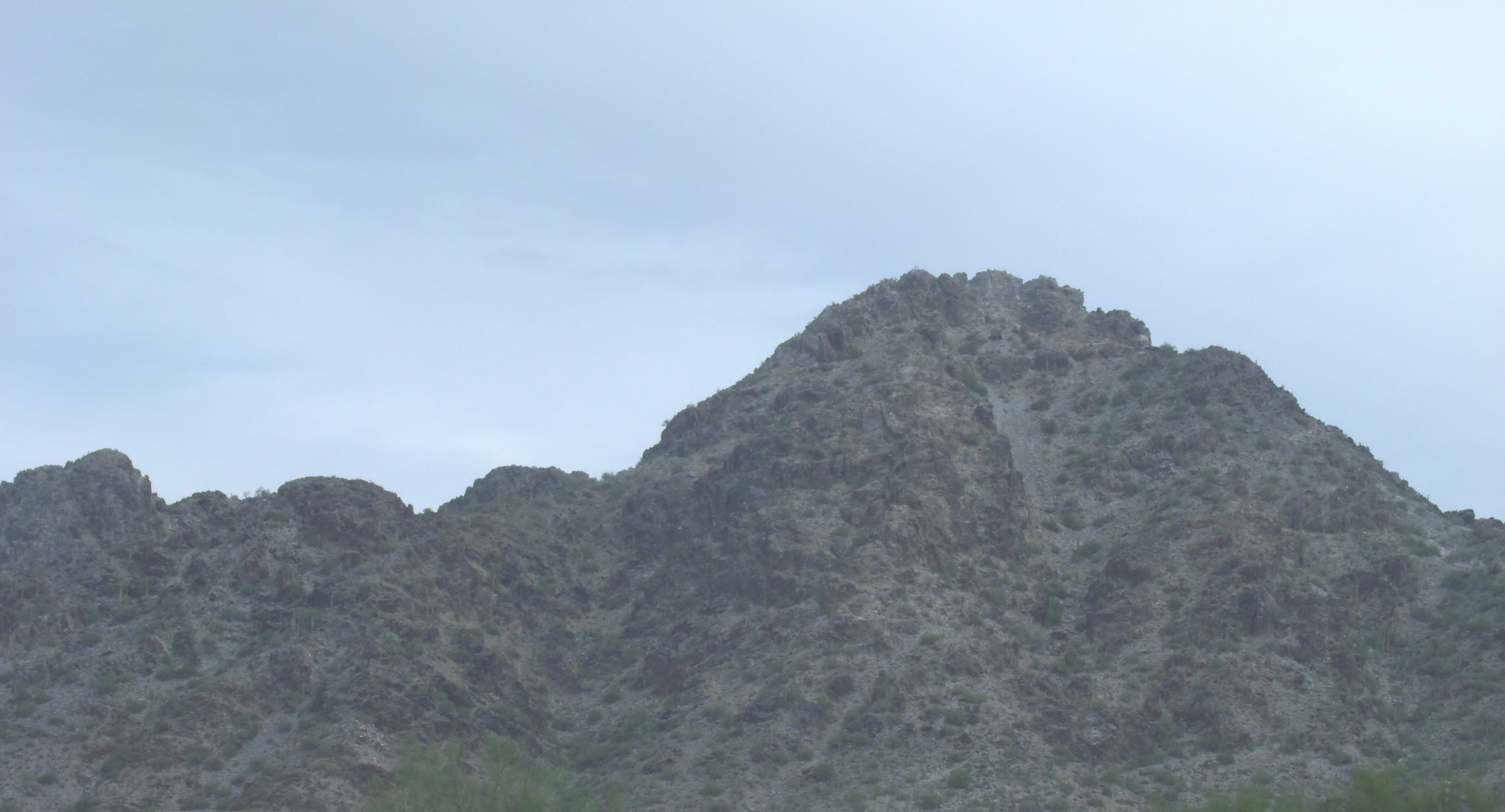
Piestewa Peak Mountain

Squaw Peak Inn is a historic structure located at 4425 E. Horseshoe Road in the east end of Piestewa Peak Mountain, formerly known as Squaw Peak Mountain. The inn, which has served as the lodging for various celebrities, was listed in the National Register of Historic Places on January 1, 1995.

== Squaw Peak Ranch and the Stopford family ==
In 1929, William Eugene D'Allemund built the first building constructed on the property which was to become known as the Squaw Peak Ranch. It was a two-bedroom, one-bathroom frame-and-stucco house. D'Allemund used it as a residence. The house featured a flat roof with parapet, a large fireplace constructed of mortared native stone (with the exterior of the front entry also framed in stone), and high ceilings in the living room and two bedrooms.

In 1937, William A. and Emily Stopford purchased an 800-acre (320 ha) parcel near the east end of the mountain for $25.00 an acre. They built a home, designed by Stopford, in the center of their parcel. The ranch house consisted of a living room, two bedrooms and two baths. Adobe bricks were used and the labor force included local Native Americans. By 1943, they converted the house into a guest ranch which they named the Squaw Peak Ranch. The ranch did not have telephones or electricity. The rooms were lit by kerosene lanterns. The water was supplied by a well which was drilled into the hard rock beneath the ranch. The Stopfords also built outhouses for the domestic help.

Frank Lloyd Wright, who was a friend of Stopford, often brought architectural students to the ranch to point out an example of appropriate architecture for the Southwest. On 6. 1944, The Stopfords sold the property to George A. and Patty D. Judson.

== Squaw Peak Inn and the Jenks family ==
The Judsons continued to operate the ranch and added slot machines. Even though the ranch was visited by celebrities such as Dick Powell and June Allyson, the Judson's decided to sell the ranch in 1946, to Davidson and Jane Jenks.

The Jenks removed the slot machines and made additions and improvements to the property and its surrounding areas. The ranch was renamed in 1946, becoming the "Squaw Peak Inn". Inns are generally establishments or buildings where travelers can seek lodging and, usually, food and drink. They are typically located along a highway or in the country. According to the local news of that time, several celebrities were guests of the Inn. Among those mentioned were Clark Gable, Robert Taylor, Dr. William Vaughn and Mamie Eisenhower. In 1961, the O'Malley Investment and Realty Co. purchased the property.

== Change of ownership ==
The O'Malleys rented the property to Willis and Margery Betts. The Betts did not accept renewal rental agreements and discontinued operating the Inn. On July 1, 1976, the property was purchased by Dr. Ted Diethrick, who wanted to convert the property into a site for the Arizona Heart Institute. However, his plan was not realized due to opposition by the neighbors in the growing residential subdivision that surrounded the Squaw Peak Inn. The property changed hands several times during the following years until it was purchased by the Malouf Brothers. The Malouf Brothers developed the Doubletree Canyon subdivision in the area and sold off 720 acres (290 ha) of land. Only 80 acres (32 ha), including where the Inn was located, remained.

== The Epley family ==
The abandoned property fell into disrepair. Only two of the original houses remained, the rest were destroyed. Water had eroded the sun-dried adobe bricks of the original structure. The entire north face of the building was significantly damaged by the erosion. The Malouf Brothers intended to destroy the remaining buildings. This did not happen because on October 21, 1980, the developers sold a parcel of just under two acres (0.81 ha) with the two remaining buildings to William "Bill" and Ann Epley.

Both historic buildings were in bad shape. However, after consulting structural engineers, the Epleys decided to restore it. The Epleys modernized the kitchen and bathrooms and built a garage. Ann Epley has added some of her hand made tile and a wall of one of the rooms has the pieces and mirror which survived a tornado that destroyed Ann's childhood house in Kansas. The main historic building is used by the Epleys as their home.

In 1987, the Inn was the major focal point for the made-for-TV movie entitled, "Probe: Plan Nine from Outer Space." The movie is about aliens who resurrect dead humans as zombies and vampires to stop humankind from creating the Solaranite (a sort of sun-driven bomb). The structure was also used on May 27, 1993, as a backdrop for an interview of then future Basketball Hall of Famer Charles Barkley for ABC's Prime Time Live.

== National Register of Historic Places ==
Squaw Peak Inn, also known as Squaw Peak Ranch, was listed on the National Register of Historic Places in 1995.

== Gallery ==
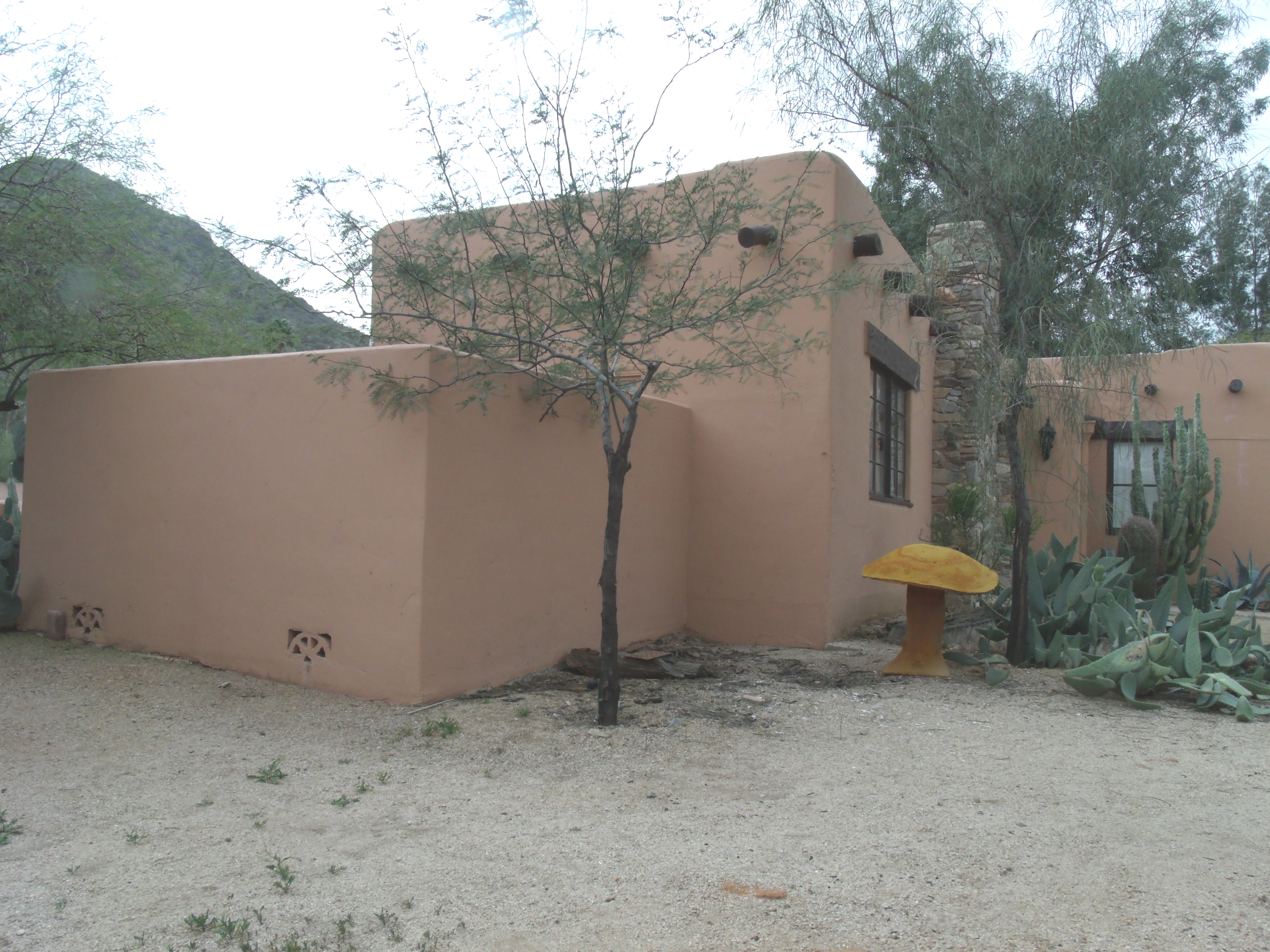
The first building built in 1929 by William Eugene D'Allemund

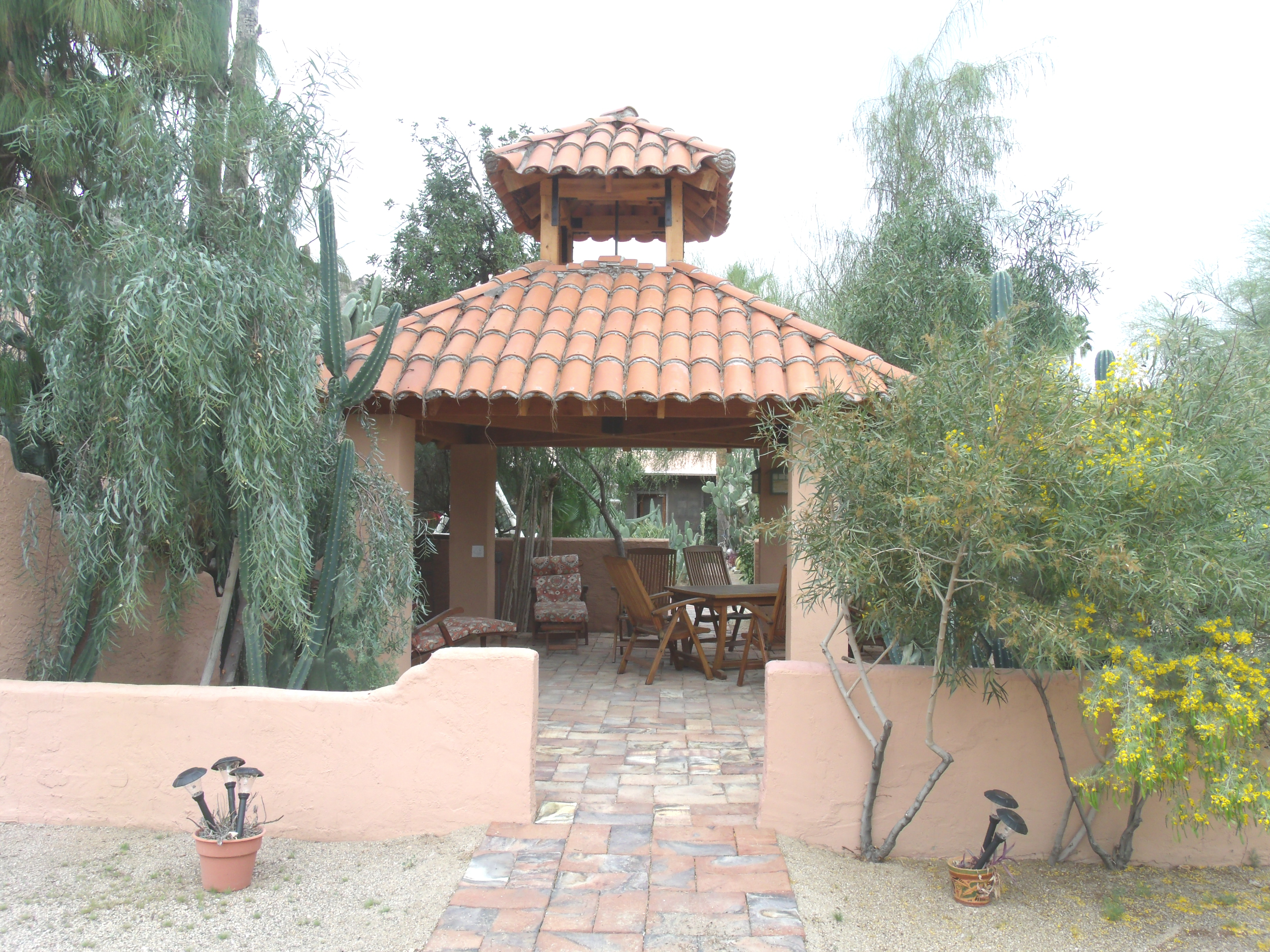
A gazebo on the property of Squaw Peak Inn built by William “Bill” Epley.

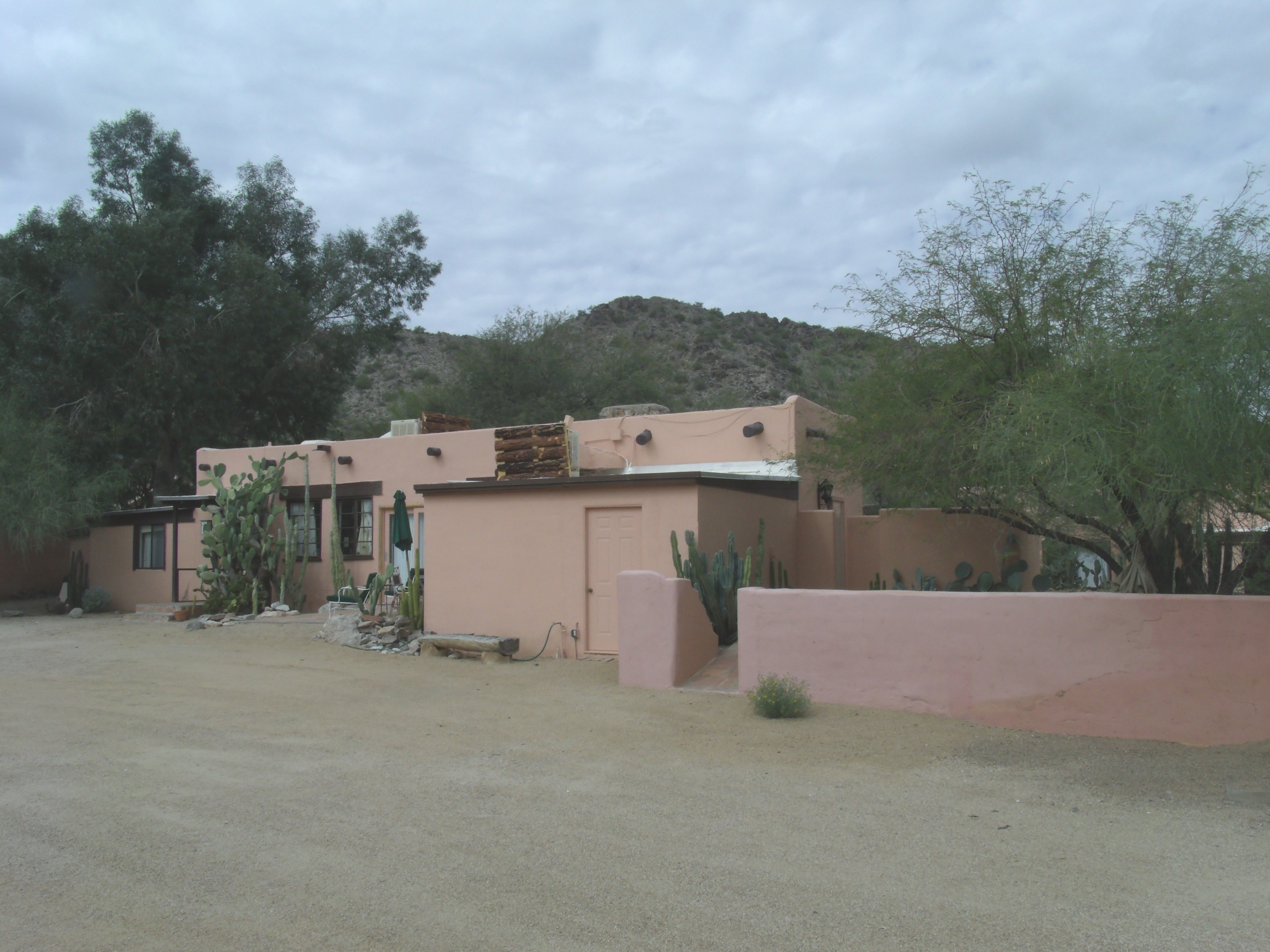
Another view of the first adobe building built in 1929 by William Eugene D’Allemund.

== See also ==
- History of Phoenix, Arizona
