= Lookout Mountain Preserve =

Municipal park in Phoenix, Arizona, United States

Coordinates: 33.624°N 112.050°W

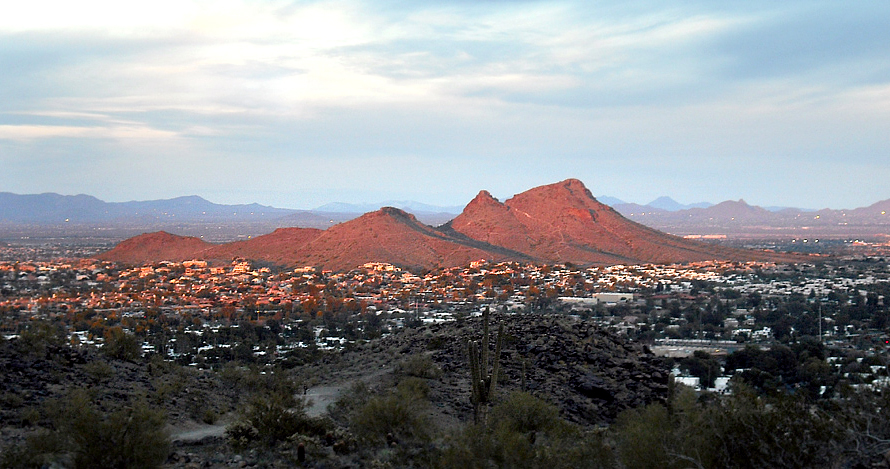
Lookout Mountain Preserve as seen from the Shaw Butte Trail of the North Mountain Park in Phoenix, Arizona, United States.

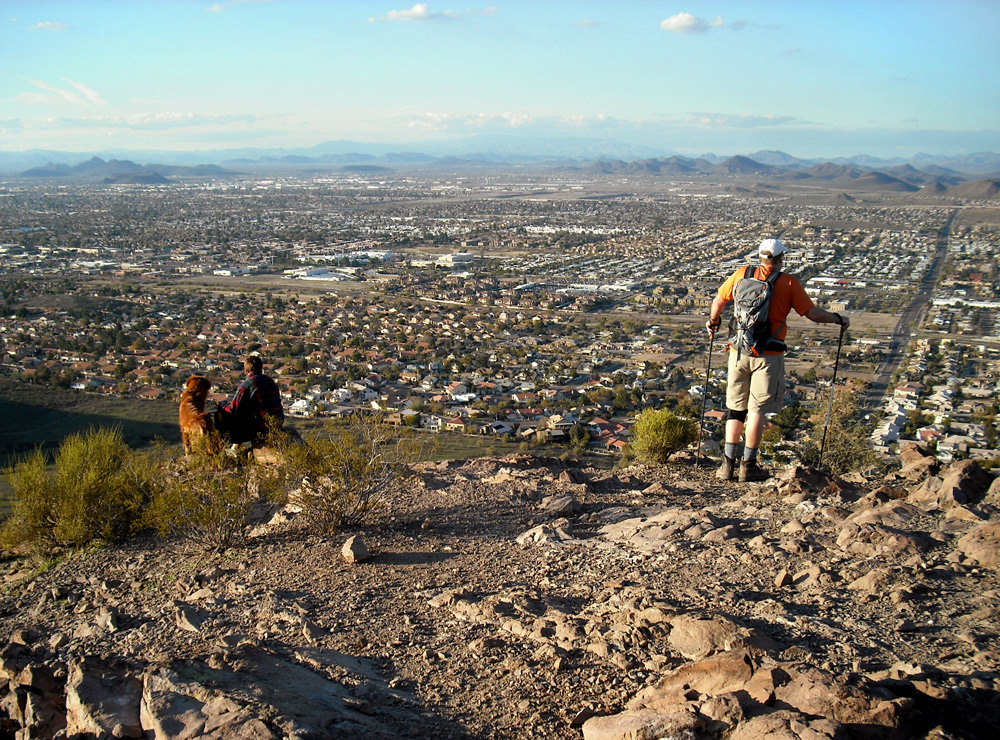
Hikers viewing the northern area of Phoenix, Arizona from the summit of Lookout Mountain.

Lookout Mountain Preserve is a municipal park in the northern part of Phoenix, Arizona. It is supervised and maintained by the Parks and Recreation Department of the City of Phoenix as part of the Phoenix Mountains Preserve system of parks. The preserve offers scenic vistas and trails for hiking and mountain biking.

Geologically, Lookout Mountain is composed of Tertiary basalt flows, Tertiary sediments and basalt breccia.
