= Mummy Mountain (Nevada) =

Mountain in Nevada, United States

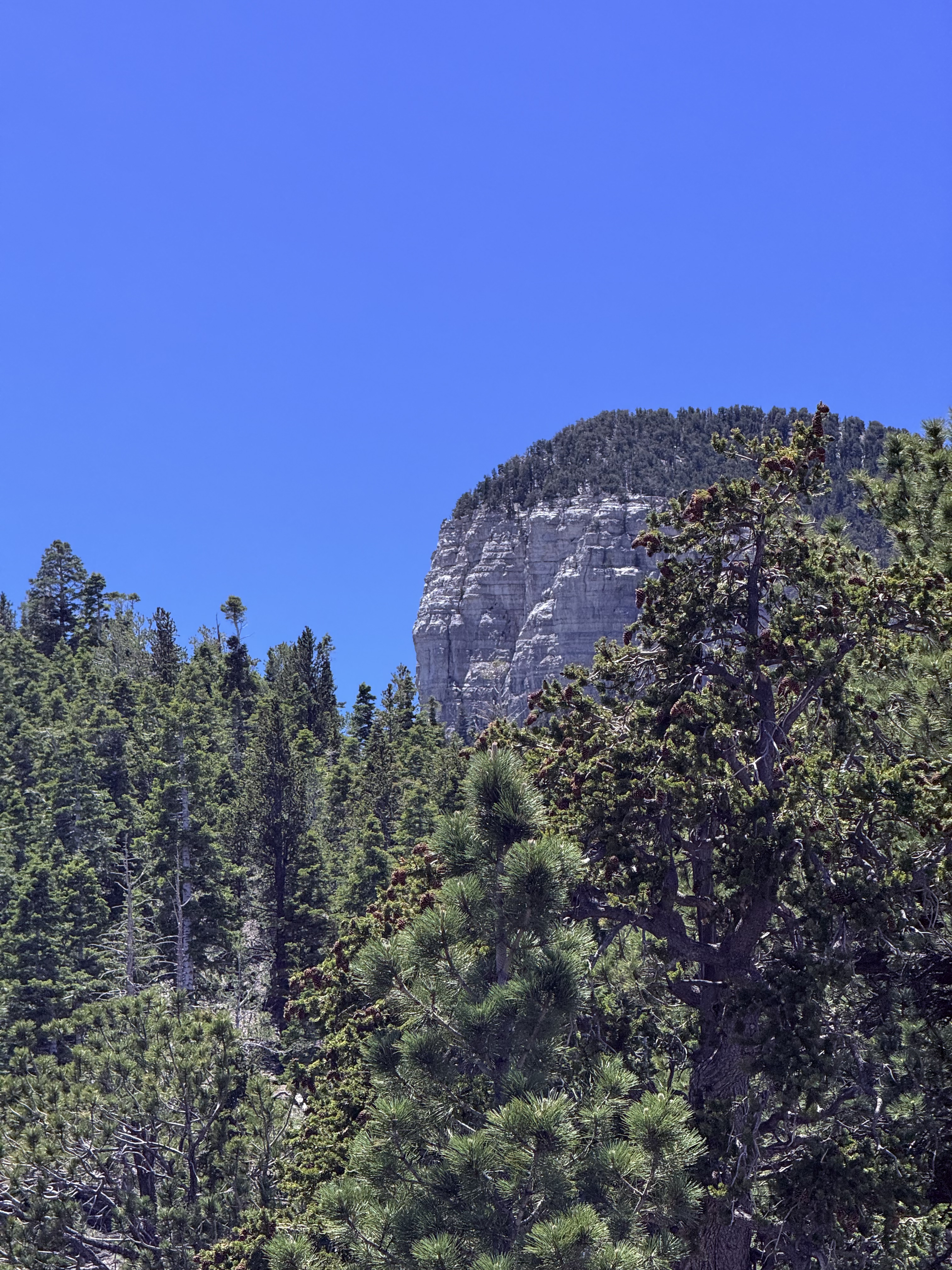
- The mountain as seen from Wild Horse Canyon

Highest point
- Elevation: 11,533 ft (3,515 m) NAVD 88
- Prominence: 801 ft (244 m)
- Coordinates: 36°17′58″N 115°38′55″W

Geography
- Location: Clark County, Nevada, U.S.
- Parent range: Spring Mountains
- Topo map: USGS Charleston Peak

Climbing
- Easiest route: Scramble

Mummy Mountain is the second highest peak of the Spring Mountains in Clark County, Nevada, United States. It is the twentieth highest mountain in the state. The mountain is located within the Mount Charleston Wilderness and the Humboldt-Toiyabe National Forest.

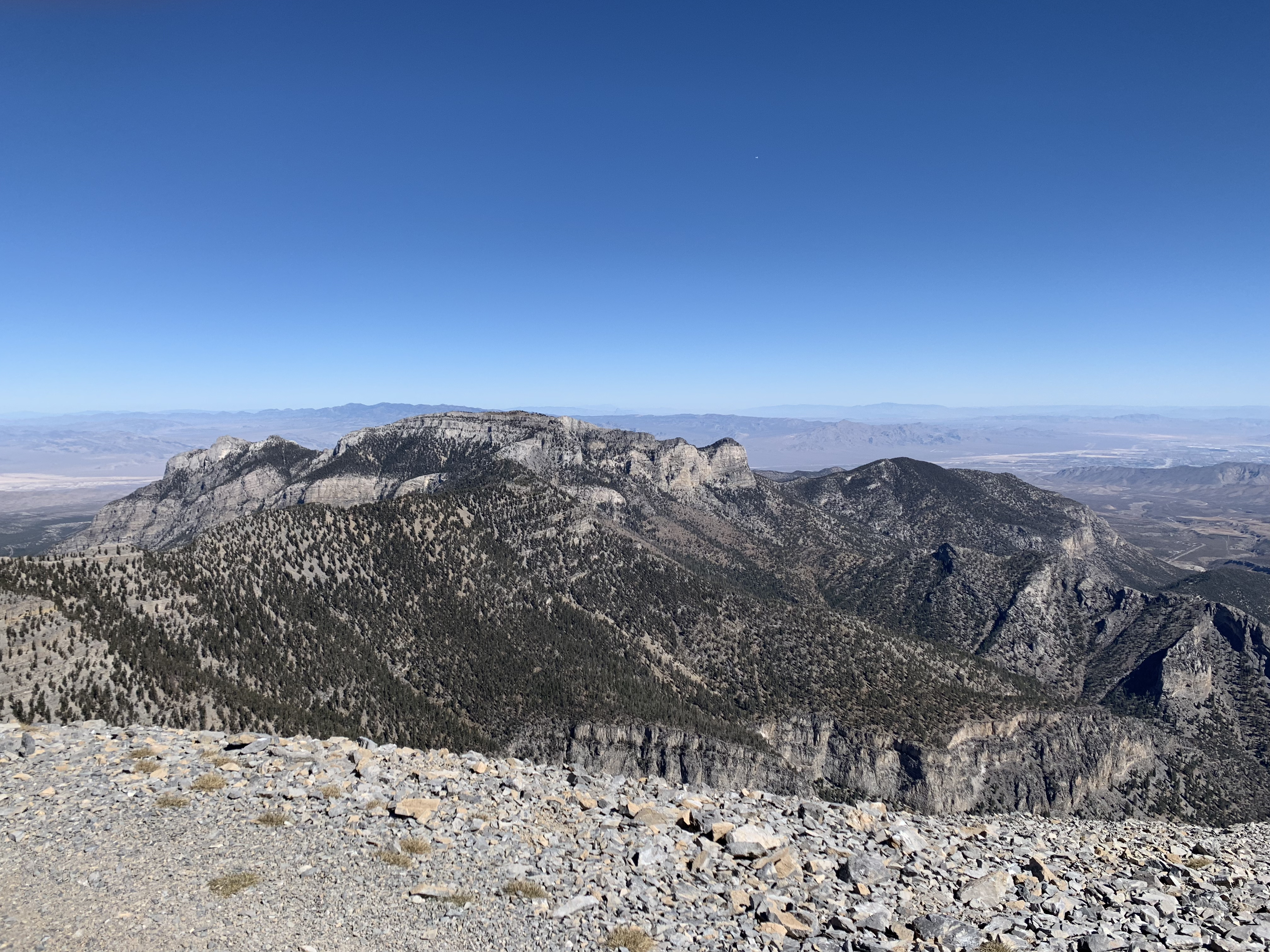
Mummy Mountain as seen from Charleston Peak

It takes its name from its vague resemblance to a mummy, or perhaps more accurately an Egyptian sarcophagus seen in profile, with the "head" to the north formed by outcropping above Lee Canyon, the gently rounded main summit forming the "body", and a southern rise and cliffs forming the "feet", called "Mummy's Toe". This appearance is especially prominent from U.S. Route 95, which passes by the mountain to the east.

The most common route to the summit is from the North Loop Trail or Trail Canyon to Mount Charleston, starting from where it reaches close to the top of the ridge between Mummy Mountain and Mount Charleston. After the first two switchbacks, a steep scramble up a scree slope reaches the top of the ridge, where a faint climber's trail leads east to the base of the summit cliffs. The route then jogs north to a class 3 chute leading to the broad and flat summit plateau.
