= North Mountain and Shaw Butte Preserves =

Mountains in Phoenix, Arizona

Coordinates: 33.5935°N 112.0800°W

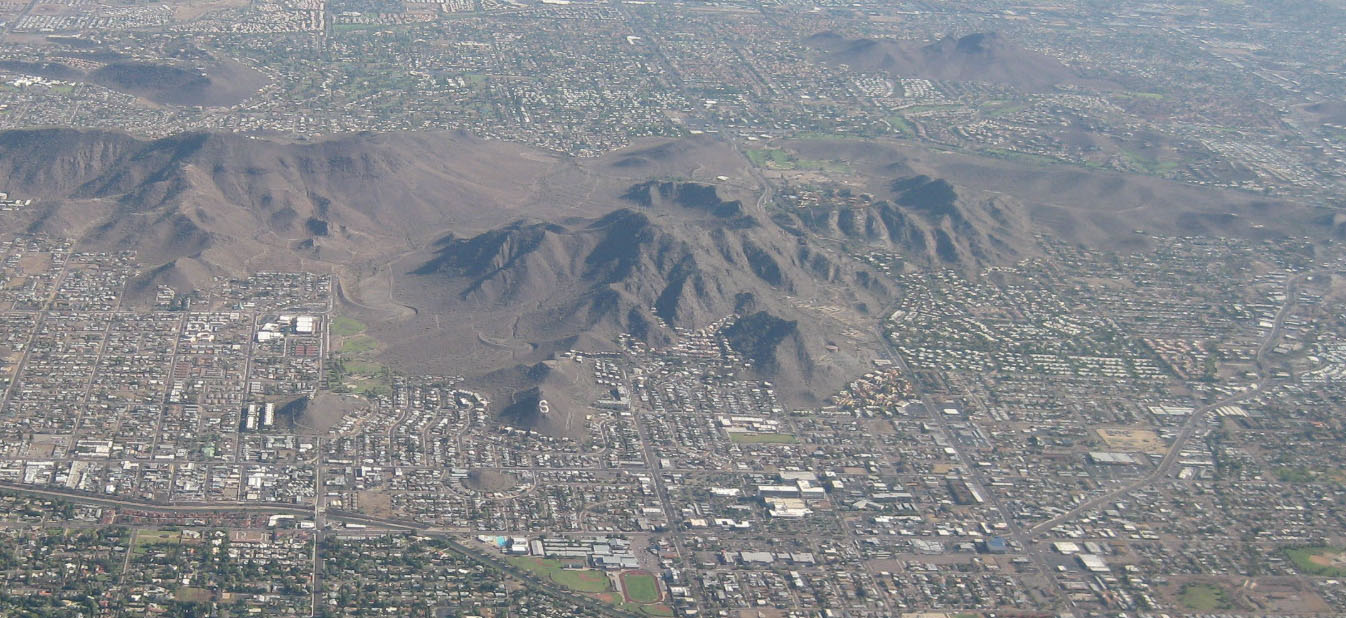
The Preserves in August 2011

North Mountain and Shaw Butte are two adjacent mountains in the Phoenix Mountains Preserve in Phoenix, Arizona. The two mountains lie to the south of Thunderbird Road, north of Hatcher Road, east of North 19th Avenue, and west of North Cave Creek Road.

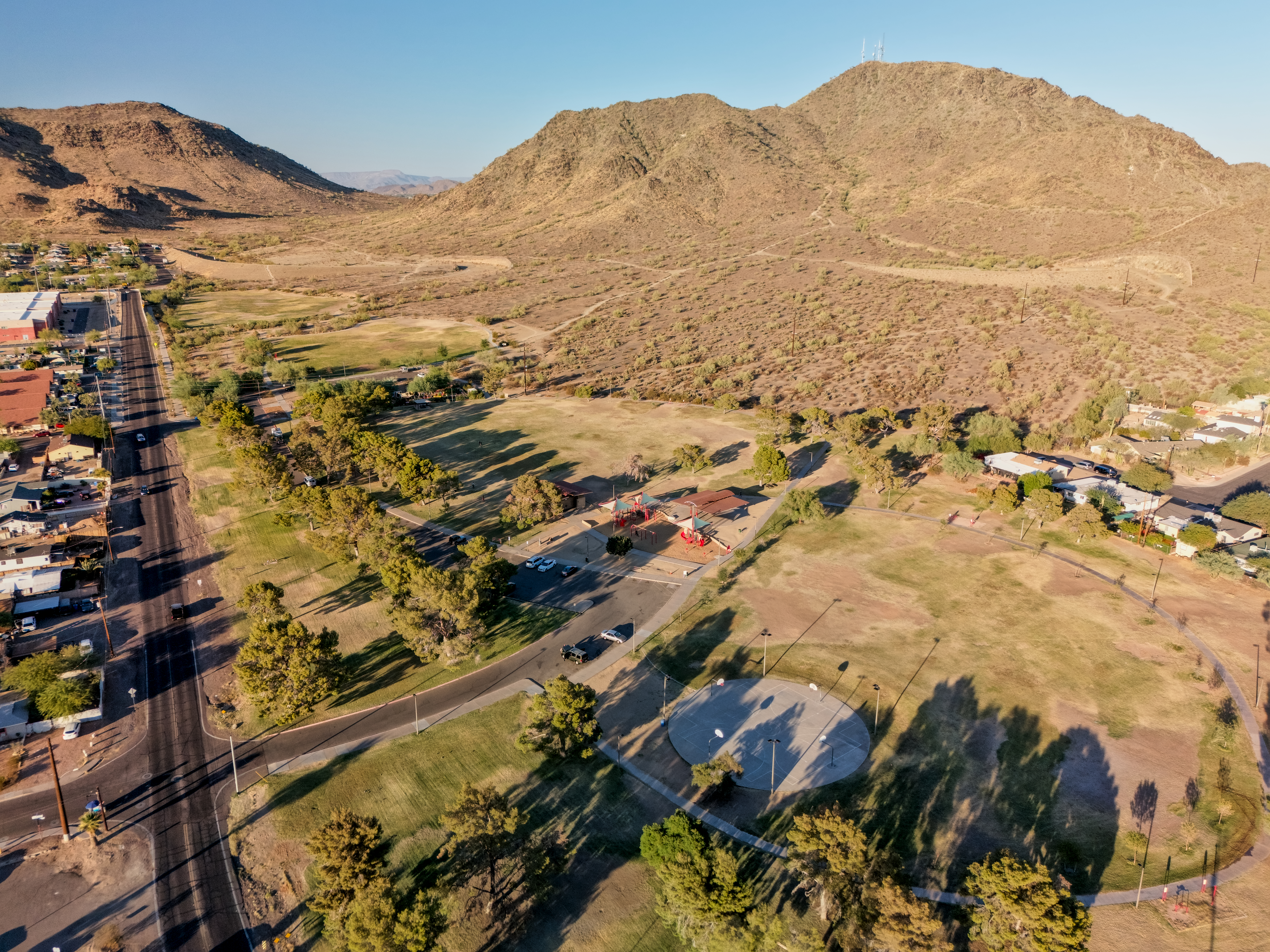
North Mountain as seen behind Mountain View Park, Phoenix, AZ.

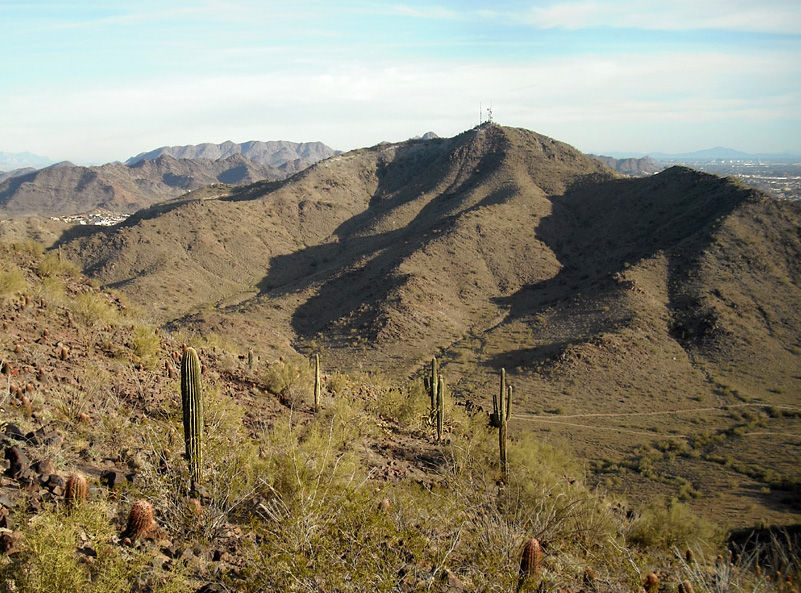
North Mountain as seen from the summit trail of Shaw Butte, Phoenix, AZ.

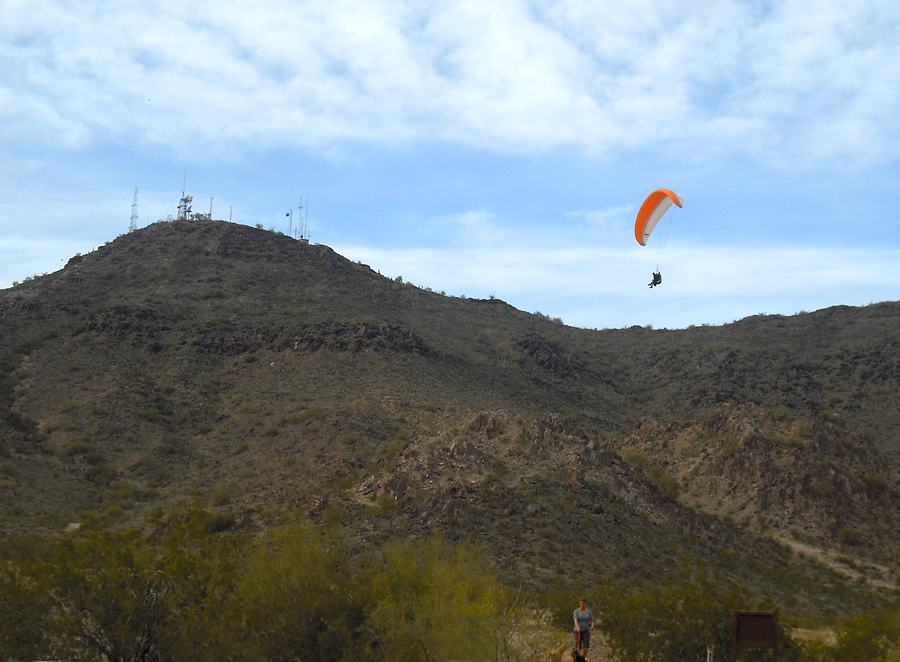
Shaw Butte in north Phoenix, Arizona. Transmission towers are found at the summit. An area of Shaw butte is also used as a launching ground for hang gliding and paragliding.

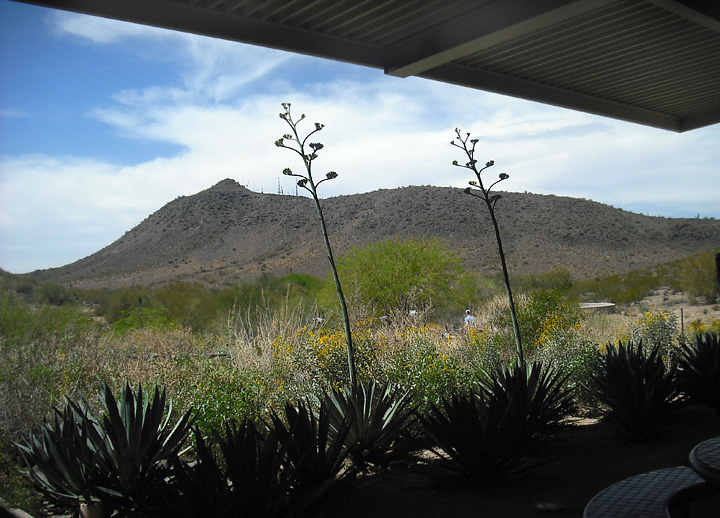
Shaw Butte as seen from the Visitor Center of the North Mountain Preserve in Phoenix.
