= Phoenix Mountains Preserve =

Public parks in Phoenix, Arizona

Coordinates: 33.55°N 112.01°W

The Phoenix Mountains Preserve (sometimes called the Phoenix Mountain Preserve) is a group of parks located among the Phoenix Mountains in Phoenix, Arizona, United States. The Phoenix Mountains Park and Recreation Area (better known as Piestewa Peak; formerly Squaw Peak), the first of these parks to be preserved, has been designated as a Phoenix Point of Pride.

Two of the parks rank among the world's largest city parks (along with McDowell Sonoran Preserve in Scottsdale, Arizona).

== Parks ==
The parks include:

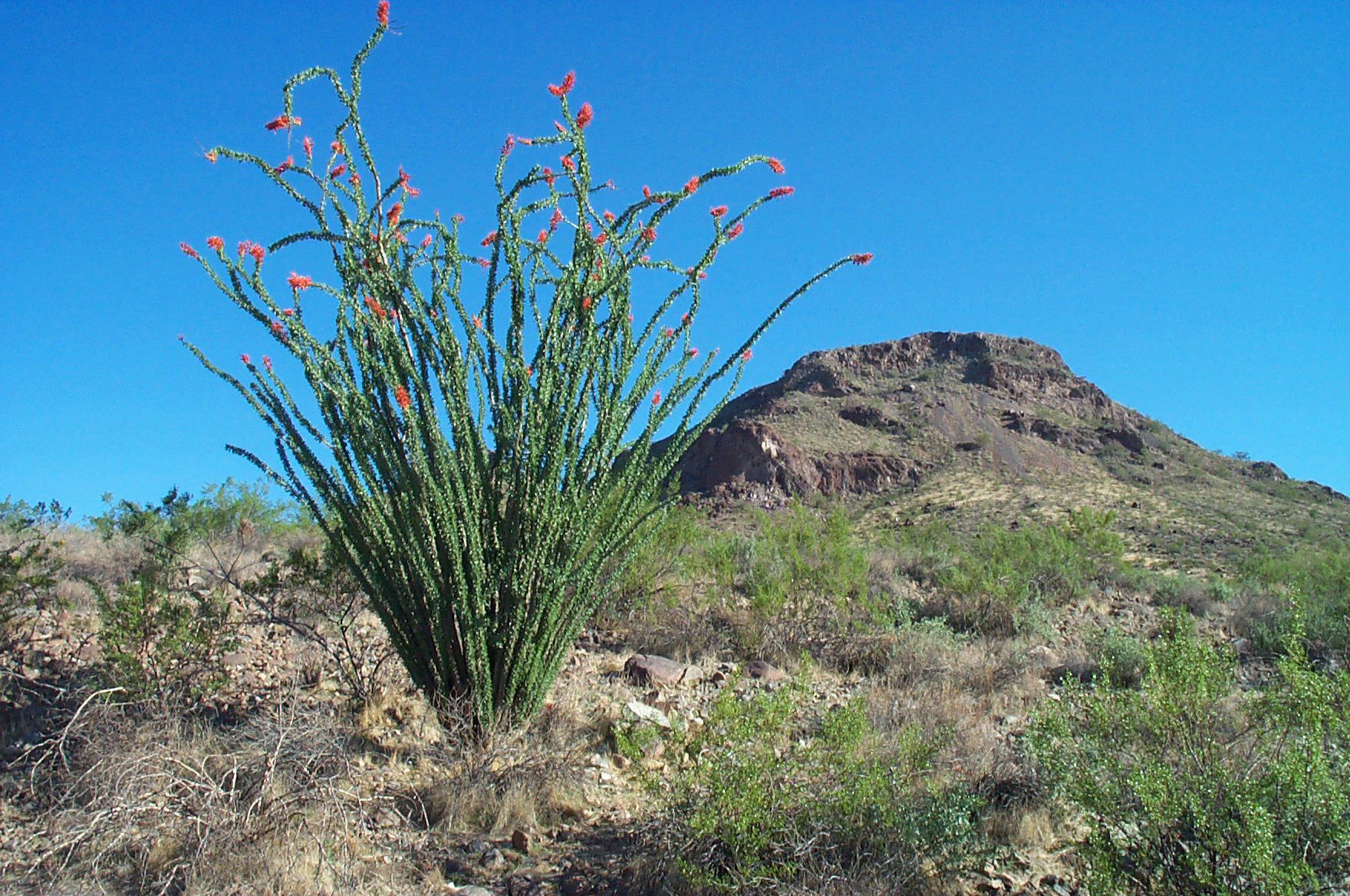
Lookout Mountain Preserve

- Piestewa Peak recreation area (formerly known as Squaw Peak; officially named the Phoenix Mountains Park and Recreation Area)

- Dreamy Draw Recreation Area, the trailhead and northern part of this park

- Camelback Mountain Park
- Papago Park
- Lookout Mountain Preserve
- North Mountain and Shaw Butte Preserves
- Phoenix Sonoran Preserve (under development)

Additionally, South Mountain Park is sometimes included in this group.

These parks largely consist of small mountains and adjacent foothills that reach about 2,000 feet (roughly 600 meters) above the desert floor. They also interrupt the checkerboard pattern of Phoenix's built environment and are quite prominent, especially since most of the city is flat and gridded. Since the largest part of the Phoenix metropolitan area sits at just over 1,000 feet (around 300 meters) above sea level, that means most of the peaks reach about 3,000 feet (under 1,000 meters) above sea level.

Originally, the park system began with Piestewa Mountain Park and North Mountain Park as county parks. However, most of the existing municipal park system was acquired in the early 1970s when Phoenix's ever-expanding development threatened to encroach on these mountainous areas. All feature extensive hiking trails and many have public access areas with parking, ramadas (picnic tables) and restrooms. Some offer nearby horse stables where horses can be rented and ridden into the park.

== See also ==
- List of historic properties in Phoenix, Arizona
- Lake Pleasant Regional Park, a Maricopa County park
- Spur Cross Ranch Conservation Area, a Maricopa County park
