= Camelback Mountain =

Landform in Maricopa County, Arizona

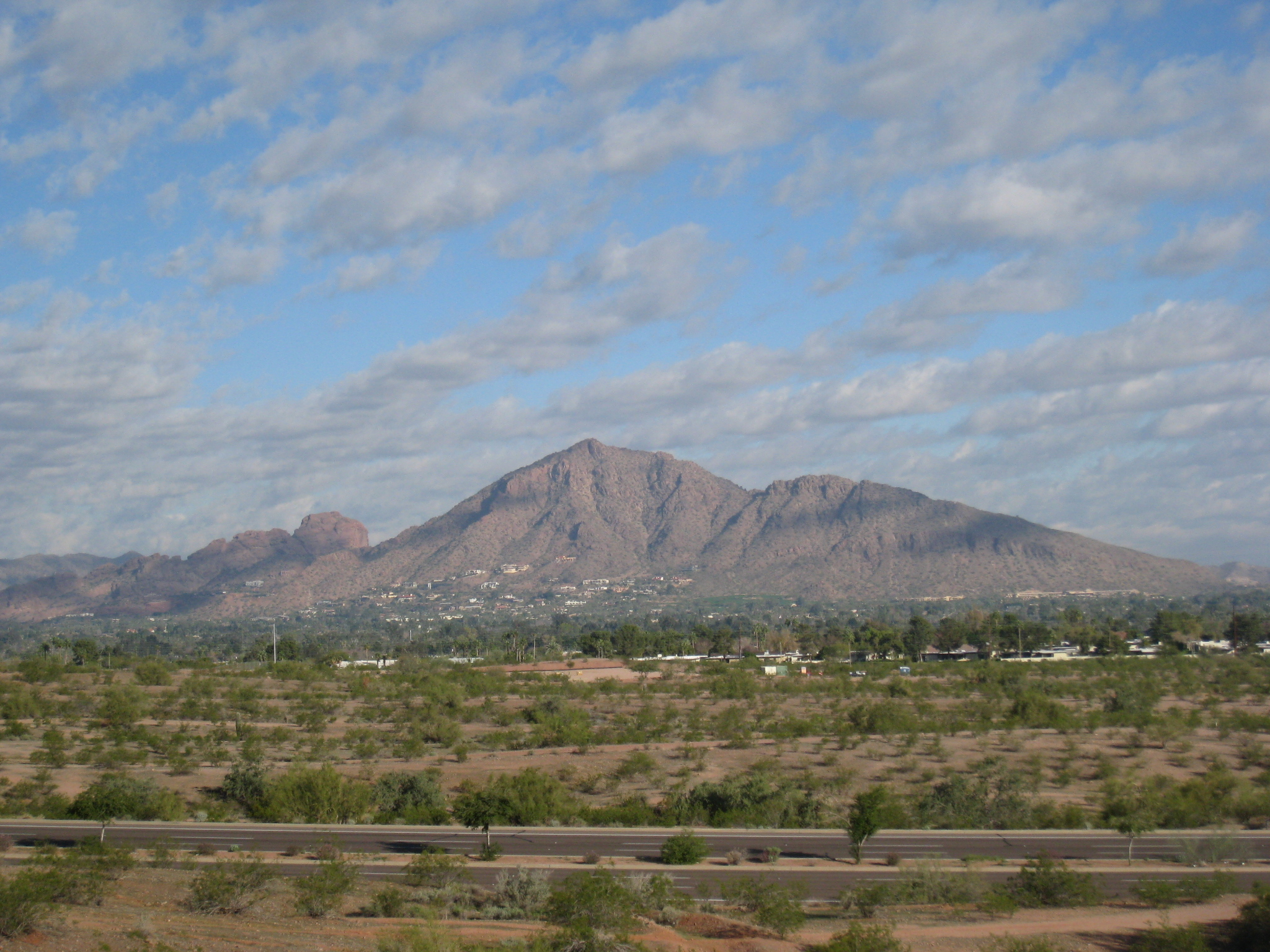

Highest point
- Elevation: 2,706 ft (825 m) NAVD 88
- Prominence: 1,334 ft (407 m)
- Coordinates: 33°30′53″N 111°57′42″W

Geography
- Location within Arizona
- Location: Maricopa County, Arizona, U.S.
- Parent range: Phoenix Mountains
- Topo map: USGS Paradise Valley

Geology
- Mountain type(s): granite, sandstone

Climbing
- Easiest route: Echo Canyon trail, Cholla trail

Camelback Mountain is a mountain in Phoenix, Arizona, United States. The name is derived from its shape, which resembles the hump and head of a kneeling camel. The mountain, a prominent landmark, is the highest peak in the Phoenix metropolitan area and located between the Arcadia neighborhood of Phoenix and the town of Paradise Valley. The Phoenix Parks and Recreation Department maintains the mountain's access, trails, and public facilities as the Echo Canyon Recreation Area, a popular recreation destination for hiking and rock climbing.

== History ==
A cave discovered on the north side of Camelback Mountain indicates that it was used as a sacred site by the prehistoric Hohokam culture before they abandoned the area in the 14th century.

In January 1879, United States President Rutherford B. Hayes included Camelback Mountain as part of a one million acre (4,000 km^{2}) reservation for the Salt River Pima and Maricopa American Indian tribes. Six months later, at the behest of Charles Poston, the Arizona Territorial Legislature reversed the decision in order to ensure the primacy of the 5,000 non-Indian area residents as well as their continued access to Salt River water.

Efforts to protect Camelback Mountain as a natural preserve began in the early 1910s. However, by the 1960s, nearly all of the area had been sold to private interests. Federal and state authorities attempted to stop development above the one thousand and six hundred feet level. They failed to halt development, and in 1963, efforts to arrange a land exchange failed in the Arizona State legislature. In 1965, United States Senator Barry Goldwater took up the cause and helped to secure the higher elevations against development. The area became a Phoenix city park in 1968.

The peak lends its name to a major east-west street in the Phoenix area called Camelback Road that runs about 34 miles (55 km) starting from the eastern border of Scottsdale through the Phoenix metropolitan area to the westside suburb of Litchfield Park.

Camelback Mountain is designated as a Phoenix Point of Pride.

== Geology ==
At 2,704 feet, the peak of the mountain is the highest point in the Phoenix area. The mountain is composed of a geologic unconformity between two separate rock formations. The higher part of the peak is Precambrian granite (ca. 1.5 billion years old). The head of the camel is predominantly red sedimentary sandstone from the Chattian stage of the Oligocene epoch (ca. 25 million years old).

== Climate ==
Climate data for Camelback Mountain (33.5147°N 111.9616°W), elevation 1,821 ft (555 m), 1991-2020 normals
Month	Jan	Feb	Mar	Apr	May	Jun	Jul	Aug	Sep	Oct	Nov	Dec	Year
Mean daily maximum °F (°C)	64.8 (18.2)	67.9 (19.9)	74.5 (23.6)	82.1 (27.8)	90.9 (32.7)	100.6 (38.1)	103.0 (39.4)	101.8 (38.8)	97.3 (36.3)	86.7 (30.4)	73.8 (23.2)	63.6 (17.6)	83.9 (28.8)
Daily mean °F (°C)	54.3 (12.4)	56.7 (13.7)	62.0 (16.7)	68.4 (20.2)	76.7 (24.8)	86.3 (30.2)	91.2 (32.9)	90.4 (32.4)	85.3 (29.6)	74.4 (23.6)	62.6 (17.0)	53.2 (11.8)	71.8 (22.1)
Mean daily minimum °F (°C)	43.8 (6.6)	45.5 (7.5)	49.6 (9.8)	54.7 (12.6)	62.6 (17.0)	72.0 (22.2)	79.4 (26.3)	79.0 (26.1)	73.4 (23.0)	62.0 (16.7)	51.2 (10.7)	42.7 (5.9)	59.7 (15.4)
Average precipitation inches (mm)	1.11 (28)	1.17 (30)	1.08 (27)	0.31 (7.9)	0.16 (4.1)	0.05 (1.3)	0.83 (21)	1.15 (29)	0.68 (17)	0.63 (16)	0.64 (16)	1.06 (27)	8.87 (224.3)
Source: PRISM Climate Group

== Recreation ==
Sunset from Camelback Mountain

The Echo Canyon Recreation Area is a public park for Camelback Mountain trails and facilities maintained by the City of Phoenix Parks and Recreation Department. Facilities include a parking area, restrooms and some water. In 2024, the city approved closure of park trails between 8 a.m. and 5 p.m. during extreme heat conditions.

Two hiking trails ascend 1,280 feet (390 m) to the peak of Camelback Mountain. The Echo Canyon Trail is 1.14 miles (1900 m) and the Cholla Trail is 1.4 mi (2300 m). Both trails are considered strenuous with steep grades. The hiking path has dirt, gravel, boulders, and some handrail-assisted sections. The average hike requires a round trip time of 1.5 to 3 hours.

The Praying Monk is a red sandstone rock formation which is used for rock climbing. Located on the northern slope, the formation resembles the silhouette of a person kneeling in prayer. It rises approximately 100 feet (30 m) and the eastern face has several permanent anchor bolts for attaching a belay rope.

== See also ==
- List of historic properties in Phoenix, Arizona
