= Lomatium eastwoodiae =

- With ripening fruits

Scientific classification
- Kingdom: Plantae
- Clade: Tracheophytes
- Clade: Angiosperms
- Clade: Eudicots
- Clade: Asterids
- Order: Apiales
- Family: Apiaceae
- Genus: Lomatium
- Species: L. eastwoodiae

Binomial name
- Lomatium eastwoodiae (J.M.Coult. & Rose) J.F.Macbr.

Synonyms
- Aletes eastwoodiae; Cogswellia eastwoodiae; Cynomarathrum eastwoodiae

Plant species in the family

Lomatium eastwoodiae, the Eastwood desert parsley or Eastwood's desertparsley is a plant in the parsley family that is only found in a small area of western Colorado, mostly in Mesa County.

== Description ==
Eastwood desert parsley is a green, herbaceous plant that grows its leaves and inflorescences directly from the top of the caudex, lacking a large visible stem, but growing to a height of about 10 to 15 centimeters (4–6 in). The caudex can be branched or unbranched and is covered in the gray remains of leaf bases from previous years. Underground it has a thick taproot.

The petioles, the leaf stems, sheath at the base and the leaves do not form just one rosette. They are divided once or twice into compound leaves with an overall narrow-oblong shape that is 2.5–7 centimeters (1–3 in) long and 1–2 cm (0.4–0.8 in) wide and are more or less blue-green in color with a rough surface. The primary leaflets, the first ones divided off the main vein of the leaf, usually have distinct petioles. The total number of distinct leaflets will be 40 to 100. They are elliptic to narrowly elliptic and 3–6.5 millimeters long and 0.5–1.5 mm wide with a smooth edge without teeth. When crushed the leaves have a soapy or celery like odor, not like anise or citronella.

It blooms early in the spring in March or April and is only rarely observed when flowering. Each plant produces 1–15 peduncles, the stalk supporting a group of flowers, that grow straight upwards or lean outwards before curving upwards. They are 4–9 centimeters (1.5–3.5 in) in length and are always longer than the leaves. The flowers are in an umbrella shaped group 1.5–3 cm wide atop the stalk. The petals of the many flower and anthers with their pollen are yellow.

The flattened seeds 8–11 mm long and usually 4–5 mm wide, but occasionally will reach 6 mm.

== Taxonomy ==
Lomatium eastwoodiae was first described by Joseph Nelson Rose and John Merle Coulter in 1900 as member of the genus Cynomarathrum named Cynomarathrum eastwoodiae. The accepted name was published in 1918 by James Francis Macbride and along with the rest of Lomatium it is classified in the Apiaceae family. Although it is listed as an accepted species in Plants of the World Online, World Plants, and the Flora of North America, the authors of the FNA treatment note in their description of the genus that, "This treatment is very much a 'splitter's' treatment, accepting nearly all the taxa that have been recognized by recent authors." Previously it has been considered as a synonym of Lomatium parryi in the Intermountain Flora. In addition to the basionym it has two other homotypic synonyms.

Table of Synonyms
Name	Year
Aletes eastwoodiae (J.M.Coult. & Rose) W.Weber	1984
Cogswellia eastwoodiae (J.M.Coult. & Rose) M.E.Jones	1908
Cynomarathrum eastwoodiae J.M.Coult. & Rose	1900

=== Names ===
The species name, eastwoodiae, references the botanist Alice Eastwood. It is known by the similar common names Eastwood's desertparsley, Eastwood's desert-parsley, Eastwood desert parsley, and Eastwood's biscuitroot.

== Range and habitat ==
Eastwood desert parsley is endemic to a small area of western Colorado. There it is known from just three counties, Mesa, Delta, and Montrose at elevations of 1,400 to 2,200 meters (4,600–7,200 ft). There are a total of 39 popultaions of the species, most of them found in Mesa County.

The plants grow in sandy soils in pinyon–juniper woodlands.

=== Conservation ===
The Eastwood desert parsley was evaluated by NatureServe in 2008 and rated as vulnerable at the global level and in Colorado (G3, S3). The threats to the species are not reported to be high and the there are over one-million individuals in just 12 of its populations, but its limited range makes the species vulnerable.
