= Bonnie Springs Ranch =

Attraction near Blue Diamond, Nevada

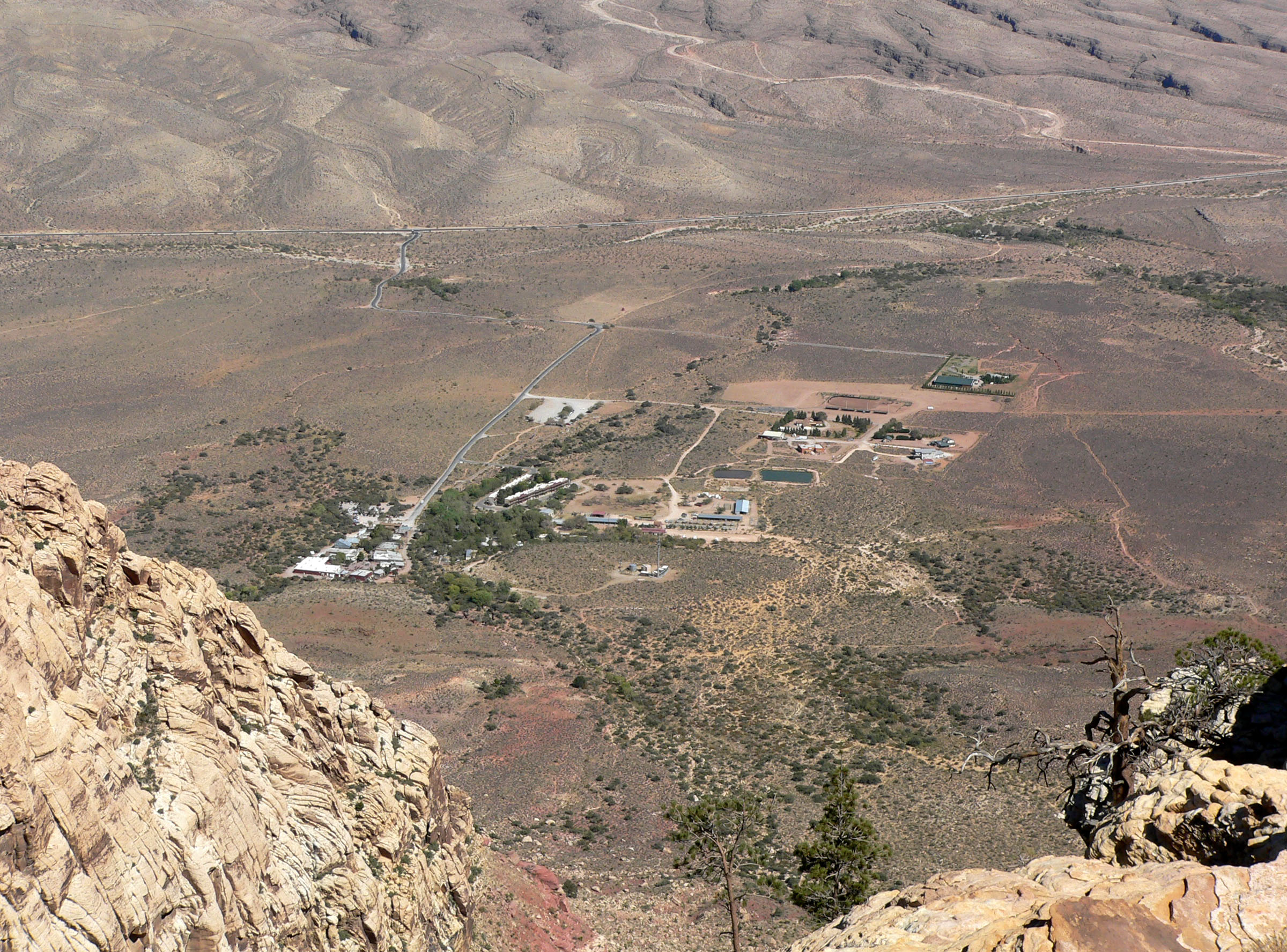
- Bonnie Springs, seen from the Spring Mountains in 2006
- Interactive map of Bonnie Springs Ranch
- Location: 16395 Bonnie Springs Road, Red Rock Canyon, Clark County, Nevada, United States
- Coordinates: 36°03′34″N 115°27′15″W
- Opened: 1958
- Closed: March 17, 2019
- Attendance: 130,000 (2007)
- Area: 63.86 acres (25.84 ha)

Bonnie Springs Ranch was an attraction near Blue Diamond, Nevada that included an 1880s Western town replica and a zoo. It is located on 63.86 acres (25.84 ha) in the Mojave Desert, below the Spring Mountains in the Red Rock Canyon area, 20 miles west of Las Vegas. The ranch has natural oasis habitat because of the spring water surfacing there.

The ranch was originally created in the 1840s, as a stopover for wagon trains heading to California. Bonnie McGaugh purchased the ranch in 1952, and it was subsequently named Bonnie Springs Ranch after her. Horseback riding and a restaurant were added by the mid-1960s. Old Nevada, the western town replica, was opened at the ranch in 1974, followed by the zoo and a motel in the 1980s. In January 2019, plans were announced to demolish the ranch and replace it with approximately 20 custom homes, a new restaurant and motel, and a barn to be used for events. Bonnie Springs closed on March 17, 2019. Its replacement, The Reserve at Red Rock Canyon, began construction three years later, after a delay caused by the COVID-19 pandemic.

== Early history ==
The site is located at approximately 4,000 feet elevation, and includes natural springs, which were within the Paiute peoples homeland for centuries. They moved their dwellings into small enclaves in the rocky cliffs to the west after settlers moved in.

The site was established in 1843 as a watering stopover for wagon trains going to California on the Old Spanish Trail. The site included a ranch house. In 1846, General John C. Frémont, on his way to Alta California, stopped at the springs to prepare for the trip through Death Valley to the Pueblo de Los Angeles. By 1860, the site consisted of a blacksmith shop and a cabin with one room.

== Bonnie Springs Ranch ==
Bonnie Springs Ranch was named after Bonnie Levinson (née McGaugh; July 30, 1921 – January 29, 2016), the daughter of western film actor and assistant director Wilbur McGaugh. In her youth, McGaugh performed as a Las Vegas dancer and showgirl. She also performed as an ice skater, eventually touring with figure skater Sonja Henie. In the 1940s, McGaugh and her mother began a turkey farm in Twentynine Palms, California. Bonnie McGaugh would deliver the live turkeys to restaurants and hotels in Las Vegas.

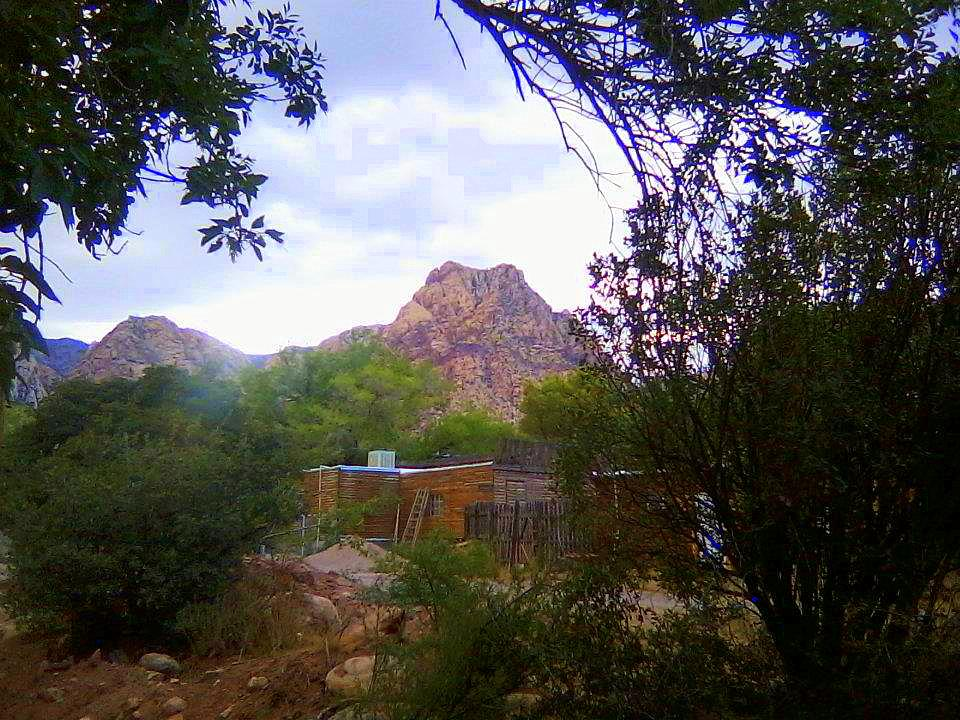
Bonnie Springs Ranch scenery

In 1952, Bonnie McGaugh delivered turkeys to a friend who owned a diner in Las Vegas and a ranch in the nearby Red Rock Canyon. The friend showed the ranch to Bonnie McGaugh, who liked the nearby mountain scenery. McGaugh leased and subsequently purchased the ranch that year. The 115-acre ranch – located 20 miles west of Las Vegas near Blue Diamond, Nevada – included a broken-down bar and a three-room house. McGaugh lived on the ranch from that point on, and Bonnie Springs Ranch would ultimately grow to occupy 63.86 acres (25.84 ha) of the ranch land. Initially, McGaugh re-opened the bar in 1952 and operated it for the next 12 years without electricity, instead relying on kerosene lamps. A dirt road provided the only access to the bar, which had previously operated as the Red Rock Tavern, opened in 1939.

Al Levinson (1924–1994) came to Las Vegas from New York in 1949; he and McGaugh met in 1952, after McGaugh re-opened the bar. According to McGaugh, they met "because someone told him he should meet the dizzy blond running the bar in the desert." The couple married in 1954, and they would stay married for 40 years until his death. Al Levinson operated a car dealership. The bar became popular among the Levinsons' friends, including Las Vegas showgirls and other celebrities who performed in shows on the Las Vegas Strip. The bar also received patronage from residents of nearby Blue Diamond. In the 1950s, Bonnie Levinson added two horses to the ranch to satisfy customer interest in horseback riding. A man subsequently traded two horses for a car at Al Levinson's dealership, and the couple later had a total of six horses. Bonnie Springs Picnic Ranch received a business license in 1958.

By 1962, the ranch included a swimming pool. A stable, Red Rock Riding Stables, was added to the ranch in 1963, followed by a restaurant in 1964. During the 1960s, Al Levinson planned to develop a housing community on 34 acres of vacant land located a half mile east of the ranch. The community was to include an airplane runway for homeowners, but the entire project was cancelled. By 1966, Bonnie Springs Recreation Ranch included picnic areas and playgrounds, as well as 28 horses for riding. Bonnie Springs became popular among Las Vegas families while remaining mostly unknown to city tourists. During the early 1970s, composer Don Swander played a piano at the ranch on weekends. In May 1974, a western town replica known as Old Nevada was added to the ranch. The following month, a fire at the ranch destroyed a barn, a trailer, and a corral.

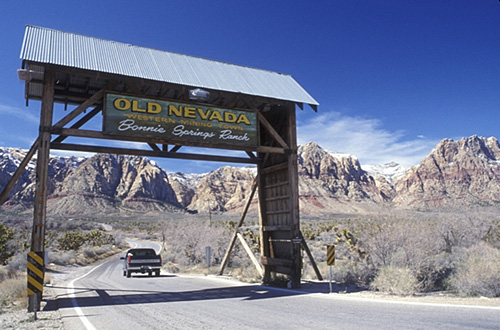
Roadside entrance

Businessman Howard Hughes owned the adjacent Sandstone Ranch. Before his death in 1976, Hughes made an offer to purchase Bonnie Springs; his offer and others up to that point were rejected by Bonnie Levinson, who did not want to sell it. A zoo had been added to the ranch by 1985. During the mid-1980s, Al Levinson had a three-year disagreement with Clark County officials over who would pay for 1.3 miles of flood-damaged road leading to the ranch. After Levinson sued county officials to repair the road, the county declined to issue him a building permit for a motel addition to the ranch, due to undecided zoning issues. In August 1986, Levinson received a building permit for a 150-room motel, after a District Judge ordered the county to issue the permit. At the time, Al Levinson also planned to eventually add a golf course to the ranch, although it never materialized. A 50-room motel was added in 1989.

The Levinsons' children, Alan Levinson and April Hopper, took over the ranch's operations after the death of their father Al Levinson, who died in December 1994. A copper and fiberglass statue of the Levinson couple was added in the mid-1990s, after approximately 18 months in the making. As of 2004, the ranch averaged 8,000 visitors during holiday weeks such as spring break and Memorial Day. In mid-2005, Alan Levinson had plans to develop a 17-house neighborhood as part of Bonnie Springs, with each house located on two acres of land, in accordance with local zoning laws. The property was one of the few sites in the Red Rock area with zoning for housing, and the development would be a joint project between Levinson and developer Randy Black Jr. The project was to be built on 34 acres of vacant property located a half mile east of the ranch, where Al Levinson previously planned a housing community in the 1960s. There were no plans to close the ranch. The ranch-style housing project received little opposition, and was approved by the Red Rock Citizens Advisory Council and the Clark County Planning Commission. The Nature Conservancy and the Sierra Club, environmental organizations, did not believe the project would have a large impact on the Red Rock Canyon area. However, it never began construction and the land remained vacant.

As of August 2005, the ranch had 86 employees, and approximately 32 of them lived there at the motel. At the time, the ranch averaged 1,000 to 1,500 visitors on Saturdays, and an average minimum of 2,000 visitors on Sundays. The clientele generally consisted of state residents and tourists. As of 2006, Bonnie Springs included the only restaurant and lodging in the Red Rock Canyon area. As of 2007, the ranch received an annual 130,000 visitors. Bonnie Levinson, at 94 years old, died in January 2016 following a brief illness. Alan Levinson and April Hopper continued to operate the ranch following her death.

=== Redevelopment plans ===
In early 2018, the ranch was put up for sale, at a cost of $31 million. Upon learning that the site was for sale, Joel Laub, a housing developer, contacted his friend, attorney J. Randall Jones; they partnered to purchase the 63-acre property, under the name BSR6276 LLC. After four months of negotiations, they beat out several other prospective buyers, including one developer who planned for a hotel and casino on the site. The partners announced redevelopment plans for the site in January 2019. New plans included the addition of approximately 20 custom homes, as well as new amenities similar to the current ranch, including a new restaurant and motel, and an "event barn" that would be used for weddings. The event barn would include 5,400 sq ft (500 m^{2}), while the new motel would include 25 rooms. The ranch's western town and zoo would need to be demolished to make room for the new development. In addition, Jones stated that he and Laub were not licensed to operate a zoo. Under the agreement, construction of the project would not begin until the ranch's animals were relocated, a task that would be handled by the Levinsons, who were supportive of the redevelopment plans. Hopper stated that the ranch was being sold because the family was ready to retire.

Laub headed the local Nature Conservancy group at the time, and stated that his goal was to develop the land "in a very conscientious way that takes into consideration the environment and conservation." Regarding Bonnie Springs, Laub said, "What's there now is not environmentally friendly." For the new project, Laub consulted with wildlife experts and arborists for a design that would include native plants and encourage movement of desert animals. Laub also planned to rehabilitate the property's natural springs as a water source for plants and animals. One of the springs had been dynamited years earlier. The project would include 8.5 to 10 acres of public space, while the remainder would be used for the housing project, with each home being built on two to three acres. The proposed houses would be designed and built to blend in with the natural environment of the Red Rock area. Jones said the houses would not be "giant McMansions with only 5 feet between them. We want it to feel like a rural area." Each house would have a maximum of 5,000 square-feet and would be allowed to occupy only 10 percent of each lot. Most of the existing trees and plants, including yuccas, would be retained, and the ranch's parking lot would be re-vegetated with plants. To drivers along Red Rock Canyon's loop road, the project's houses would be obscured by landscaping. Jones and Laub would be among residents in the new project. Zoning laws allowed for up to 31 houses to be built on the land. Jones stated that while additional homes and a larger motel could have been added to the redevelopment plans, they chose not to do so, to keep the area as similar to Bonnie Springs as possible. A water company, CSR Water Cooperative, ultimately had to be created to serve the needs of the future community. It includes a 375,000-gallon storage tank.

The sale was expected to be finalized in mid-March 2019, at which point demolition would begin on the ranch. The partners wanted to retain the Bonnie Springs name for the new project, although negotiations with the Levinson family had yet to be held regarding the transfer of naming rights. Visitation increased by hundreds of people in the days following the announcement of the redevelopment plans, which received backlash from the public, as expected by Laub and Jones. Two petitions were started to save the ranch and have it declared a historic landmark, although such a designation would not prevent the ranch from being sold or demolished. In addition, there were no government agencies that had the necessary funds to purchase the ranch. Within several days of the redevelopment announcement, the petitions had garnered more than 25,000 signatures, and had reached 51,000 signatures within two weeks. Jones acknowledged that "people are emotionally attached to Bonnie Springs," including himself and Laub, as well as their families. Jones further stated that the new project would be "different for sure. A transition, no question. Sometimes transitions make people sad. I understand that. Our hope is to make a transition that everybody feels good about in the end."

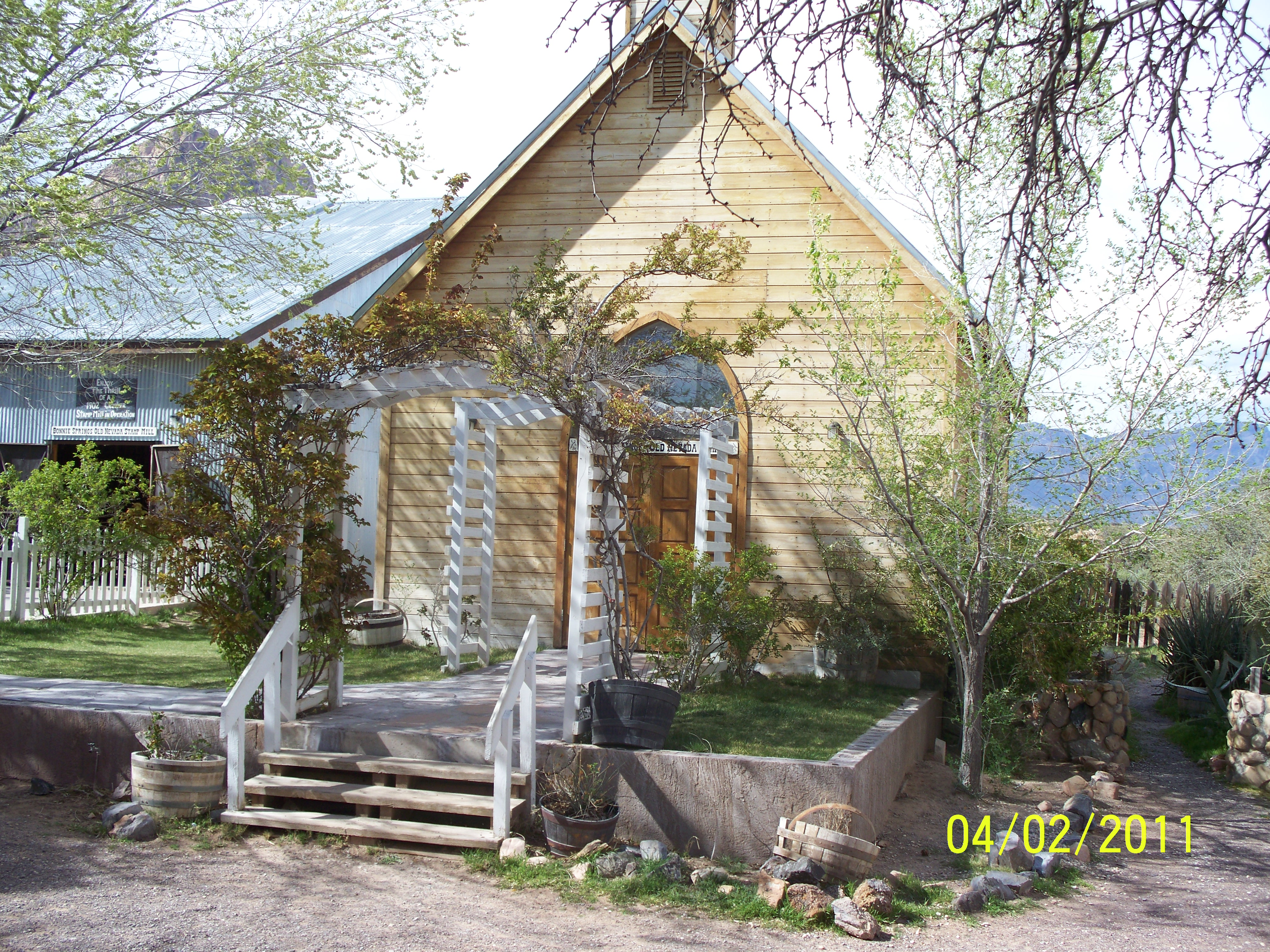
The western town's wedding chapel

Later in January 2019, it was announced that a third party buyer was interested in fully relocating the ranch's western town to a new site to continue its operations as an attraction. The new owners also considered ways to incorporate the property's history and artifacts into the redevelopment project. It was later announced that a local woman, Sharon Linsebardt, wanted to relocate the western town's wedding chapel to her farm animal sanctuary in northwest Las Vegas, which also conducted weddings. The Levinsons agreed to donate the chapel to Linsebardt on the condition that she pay to have the 20-foot-wide building relocated.

In February 2019, the Clark County Planning Commission unanimously approved the redevelopment plans, including 22 homes and a bed and breakfast, despite some opposition. Opponents included Nevada's Center for Biological Diversity, which believed that the homes – referring to them as "McMansions" – would "fundamentally alter the character of Red Rock." The commission stated that the project would not set a precedent for more homebuilders to develop in the area. Planning commissioner Nelson Stone said the new project would allow for a restoration of the natural environment, and believed that noise in the area would "all but disappear". The Red Rock Citizens Advisory Council and Clark County staff also recommended approval of the project. At the time, nearly 54,000 people had signed one of the petitions to declare the ranch a historical landmark, although the commission stated that no part of the ranch had been deemed historic. An appeal against the new project was filed with the Clark County Commission, by a Las Vegas resident who cited unanswered questions about the new project's public facilities.

Bonnie Springs closed on March 17, 2019. The ranch endured long lines during its final two days, with wait times up to 40 minutes to enter. Kathy Espin, an opinion writer for Las Vegas Review-Journal, believed that Bonnie Springs' closure was not a significant loss for the community. Three days after the closure, the Clark County Commission upheld the new project's approval against the appeal, with Laub stating that the public facilities did not require county approval through a public hearing. The sale was finalized on April 2, 2019, at a cost of $25 million. By that time, the ranch's animals had been relocated to other zoos and habitats. A live auction of various Bonnie Springs memorabilia took place at the ranch's outdoor arena area later that month, followed by online auctions. The first phase of demolition, including the motel and restaurant, was approved by the county on June 17, 2019.

Twenty residential parcels went on sale in February 2020, when it was announced that the new project would be named The Ranch at Red Rock. Laub and Jones were unable to work out a deal with the Levinsons to acquire the rights to use the "Bonnie Springs" name. The residential lots ranged from 2 to 4 acres each, with prices from $3 million to $6.5 million. The homes would be accessed through a guard-gated community entrance. The future owners of each lot would be responsible for building their own homes. Design and construction guidelines were created to limit the size of the homes and to ensure that they blend in with the surrounding environment. Seven of the parcels were reserved within the first week. At the time, many of the buildings at Bonnie Springs had been demolished, with the exception of the Old Nevada buildings. Laub said he was giving away wood and other materials from the buildings to anyone who was interested "before we just demo it and send it to the dump."

The project was put on hold in March 2020, due to the COVID-19 pandemic in Nevada. During this time, the project was redesigned, and the number of home lots was reduced to 16, allowing for more public space, totaling nearly 14 acres. The project will incorporate a biophilic design, and houses are now limited to 7,500 sq ft (700 m^{2}). New amenities include a boutique hotel and spa, as well as an amphitheater. Groundbreaking for the project, now known as The Reserve at Red Rock Canyon, took place on March 15, 2022. The remaining structures at Bonnie Springs had been demolished by that point. The 15,000 sq ft (1,400 m^{2}) event hall is the first phase of the project's commercial element, and will not be completed until at least 2024. The next phase would include the restaurant, followed by a third phase consisting of the hotel and pool.

== Features ==
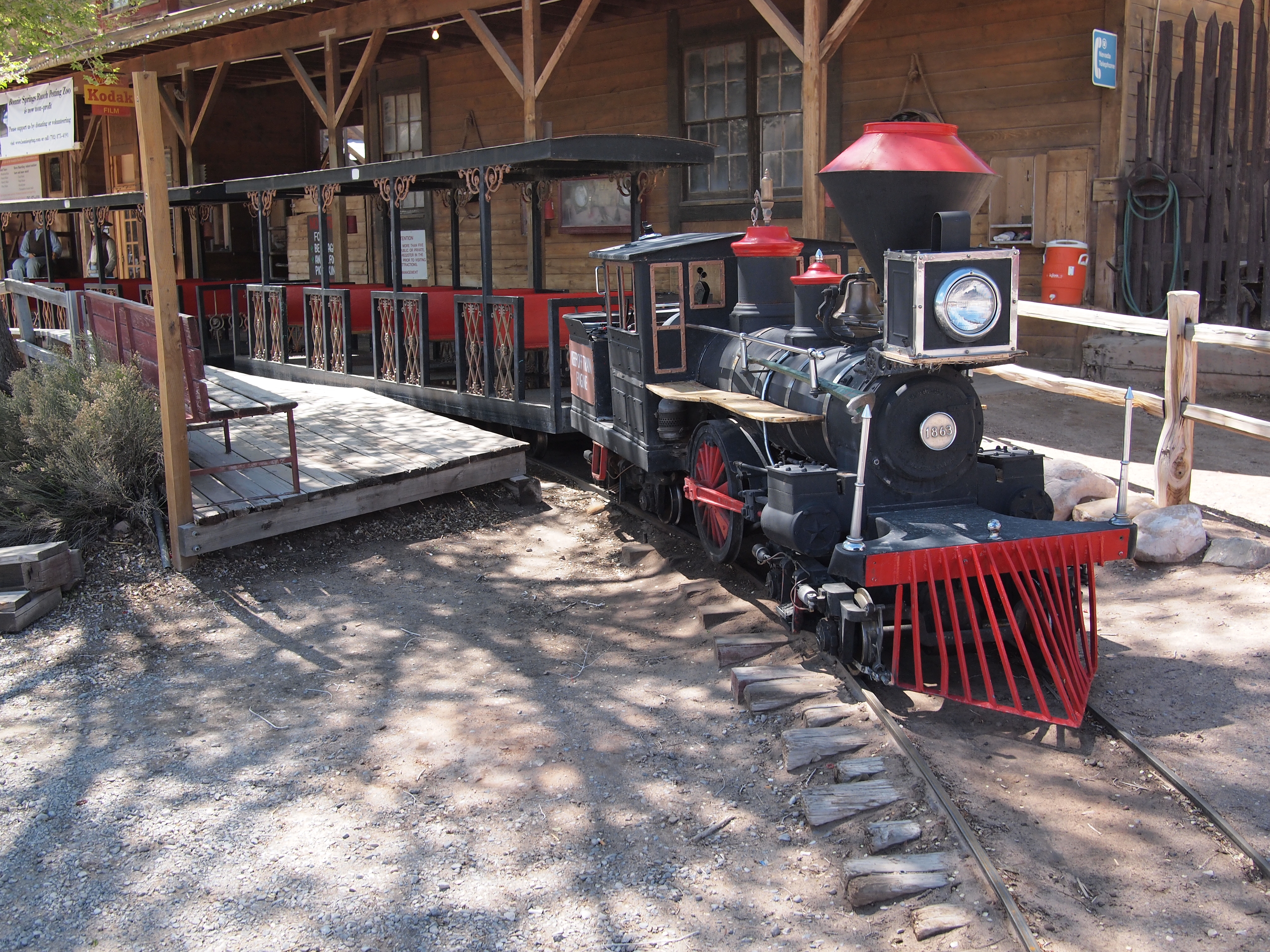
Miniature train ride at the entrance to Old Nevada

The two-story Bonnie Springs motel included a swimming pool and themed rooms such as Chinese, Spanish, and American Indian. The motel had 48 rooms, some of which include a jacuzzi. The ranch also included the Red Rock Riding Stables, with pony and horseback riding. The ranch's outdoor arena included bleacher seating used for events such as rodeos. On weekends, a miniature train provided optional transportation from a large parking lot to the ranch's motel and the Old Nevada western town. A smaller parking lot was located near the entrance to Old Nevada. In February 2018, after a year of negotiations, the ranch was expected to begin offering helicopter tours of Red Rock Canyon.

=== Bar and restaurant ===
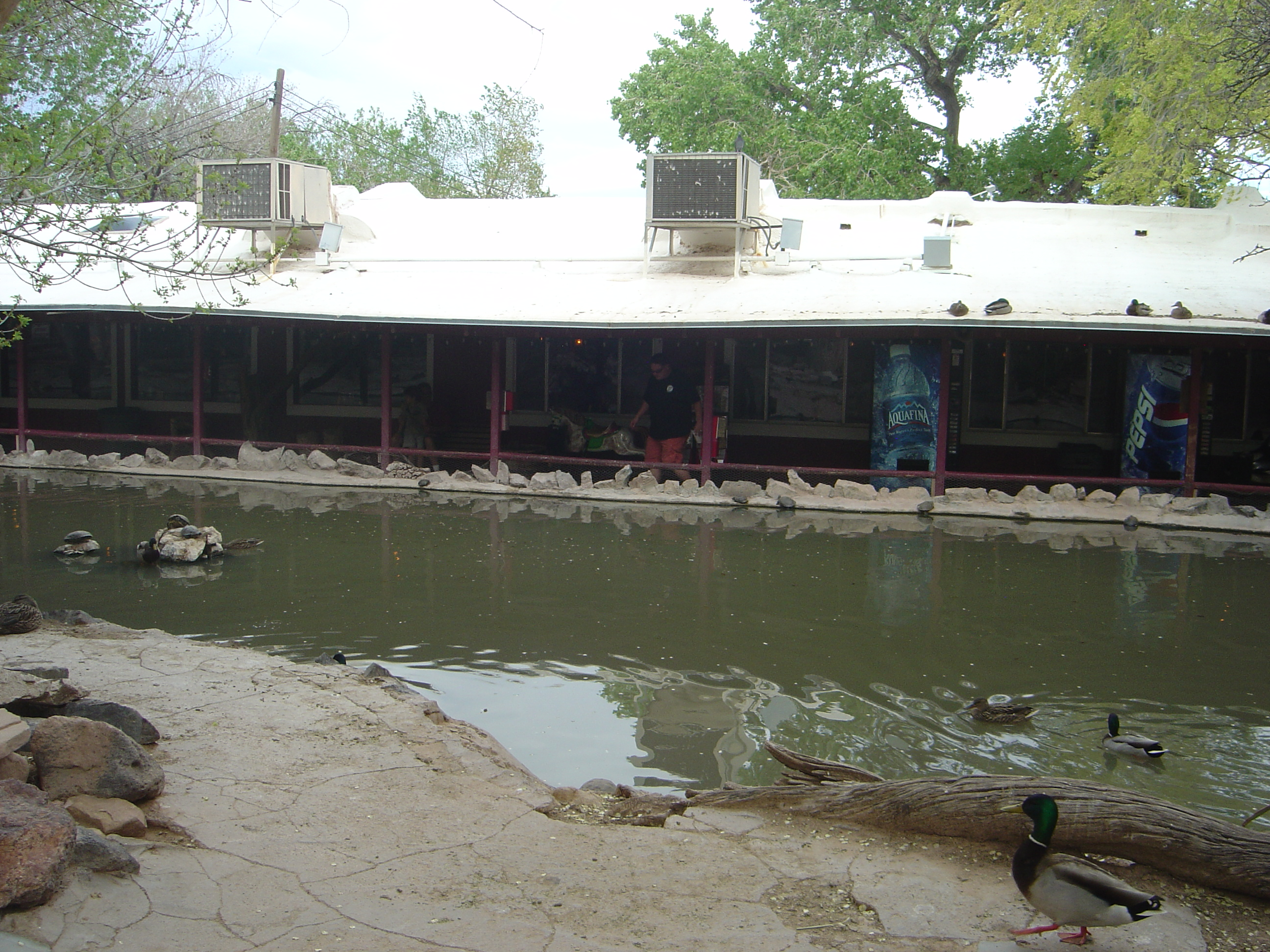
Restaurant and pond

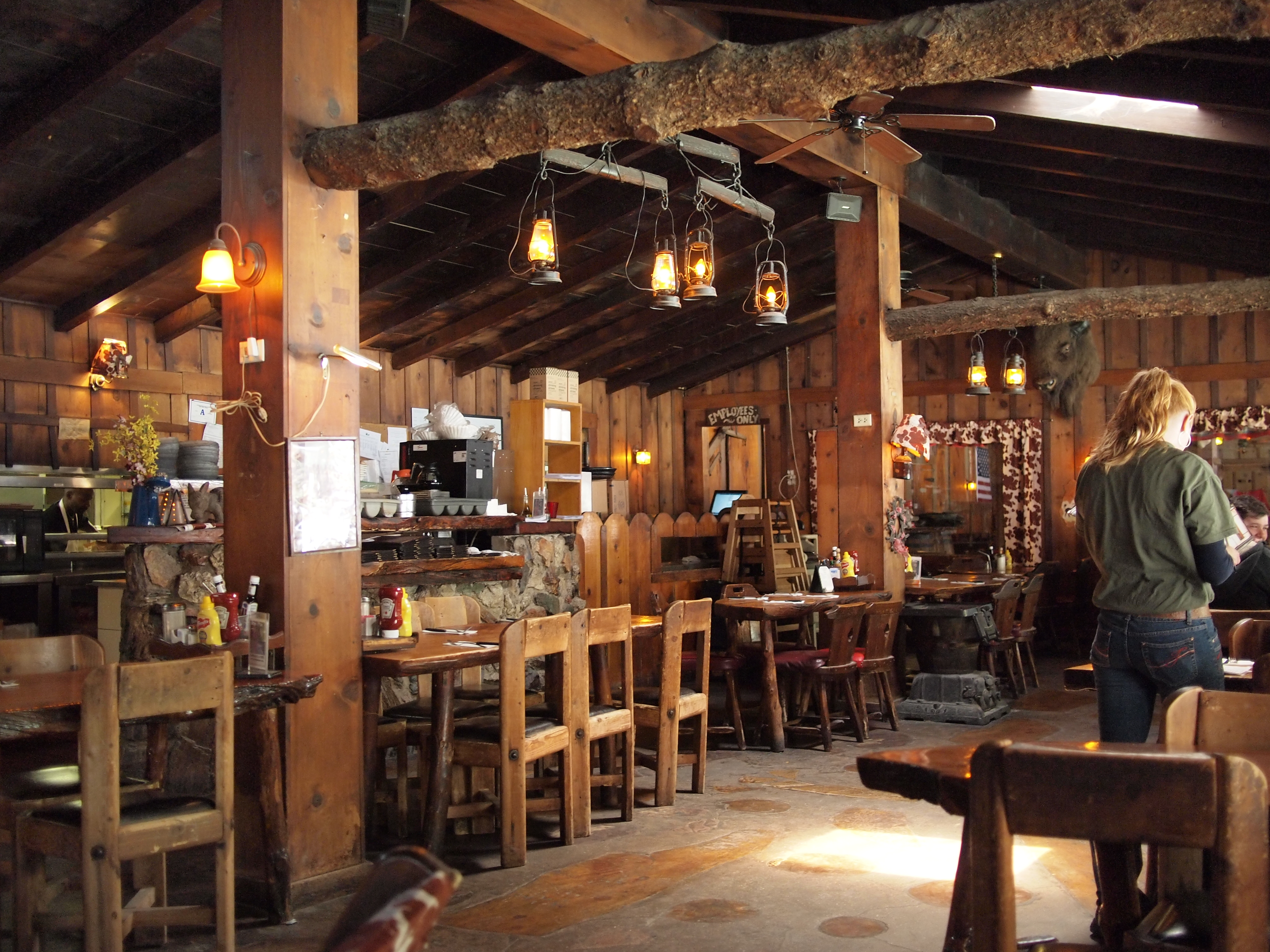
Restaurant interior

Prior to the opening of a restaurant on the property, Bonnie Levinson had served biscuits and coffee as a snack to friends who came to visit the ranch. She subsequently began cooking meals for her various ranch hands, and she later said, "Word soon got around that you could get a good cup of coffee here, and people started dropping by for meals," which convinced the Levinsons to add a restaurant to the ranch. The Levinsons expanded and refurbished the 1840s ranch house into a restaurant and bar, initially opened as the Bonnie Springs Steak House in 1964. Bonnie Levinson created the restaurant's furniture and helped build the structure's large central fireplace.

A pond was ultimately built in front of the restaurant/bar. The pond once contained fish, which were allowed to be caught with the use of fishing equipment that the ranch rented out. The restaurant offered to then cook the caught fish for customers. By 1980, the pond was inhabited by ducks, geese, and turtles.

The bar/restaurant became known for a collection of neckties that hang from the ceiling, with dollar bills pinned to them. Al Levinson had decided on a policy against ties in the restaurant after he had been turned away from a restaurant at the Desert Inn casino for wearing a bolo tie. From that point on, he would take each tie that came into his restaurant and pinned it to the ceiling, a tradition dating to at least 1974. People later started pinning money to the ties.

In 2001, the money from the ceiling — a total of $18,744 — was donated to local firefighters. The money had been accumulating since 1991, and the Levinson family had been motivated to donate it following the September 11 attacks. The ties of the bar's ceiling continued to accumulate money bills, which were donated to various nonprofit organizations. The restaurant included a half-pound bison burger.

=== Old Nevada ===
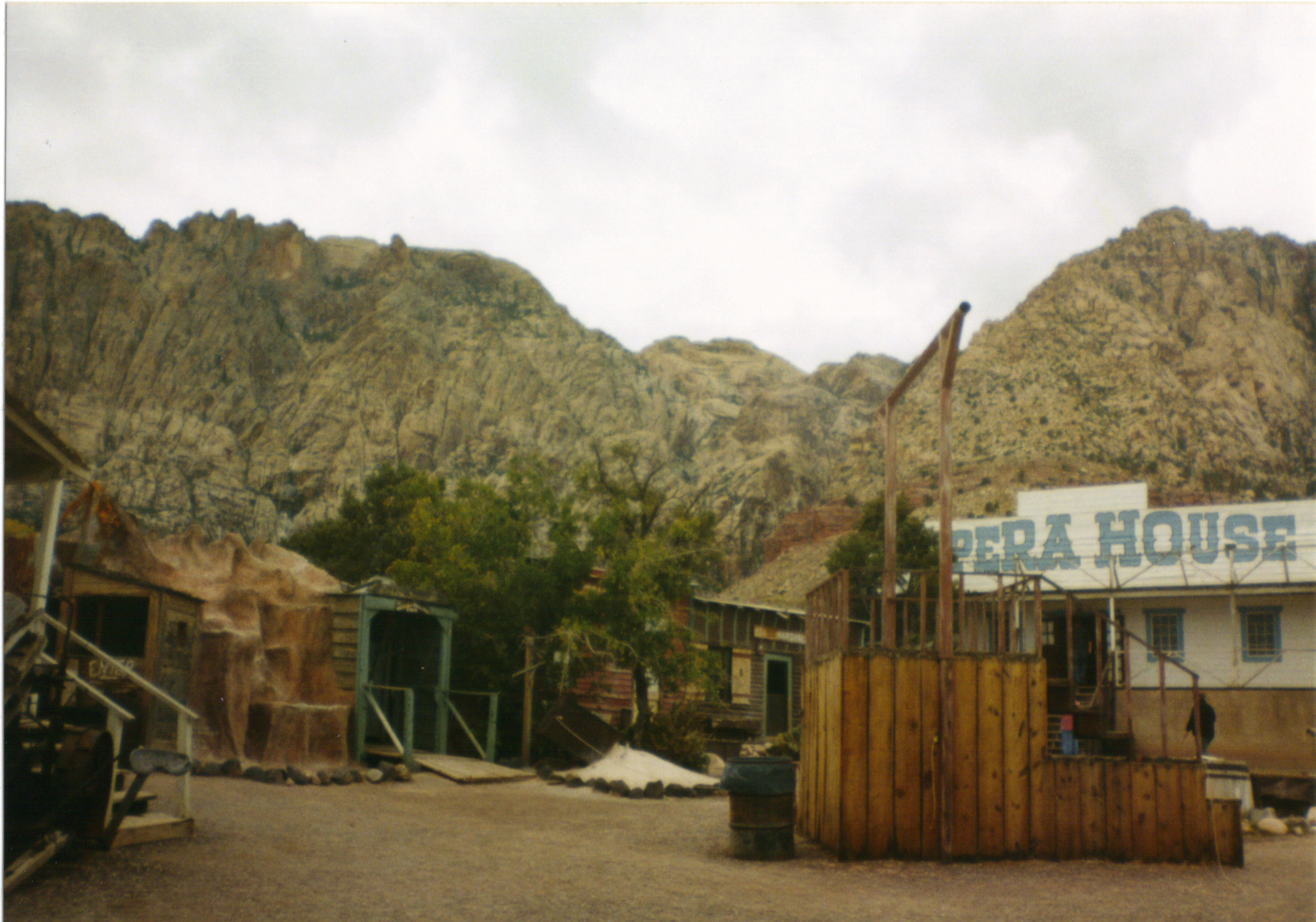

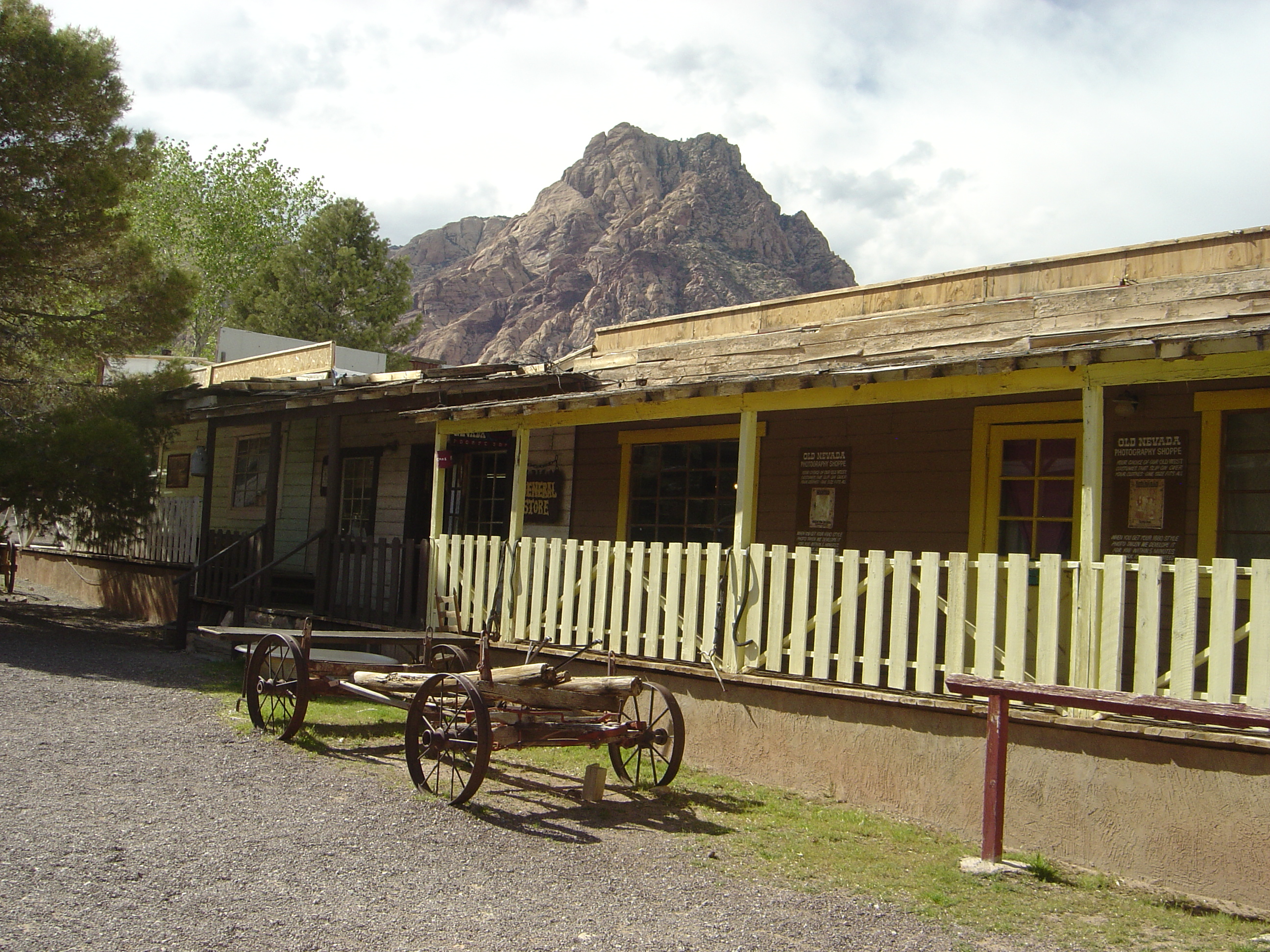
Buildings at Old Nevada

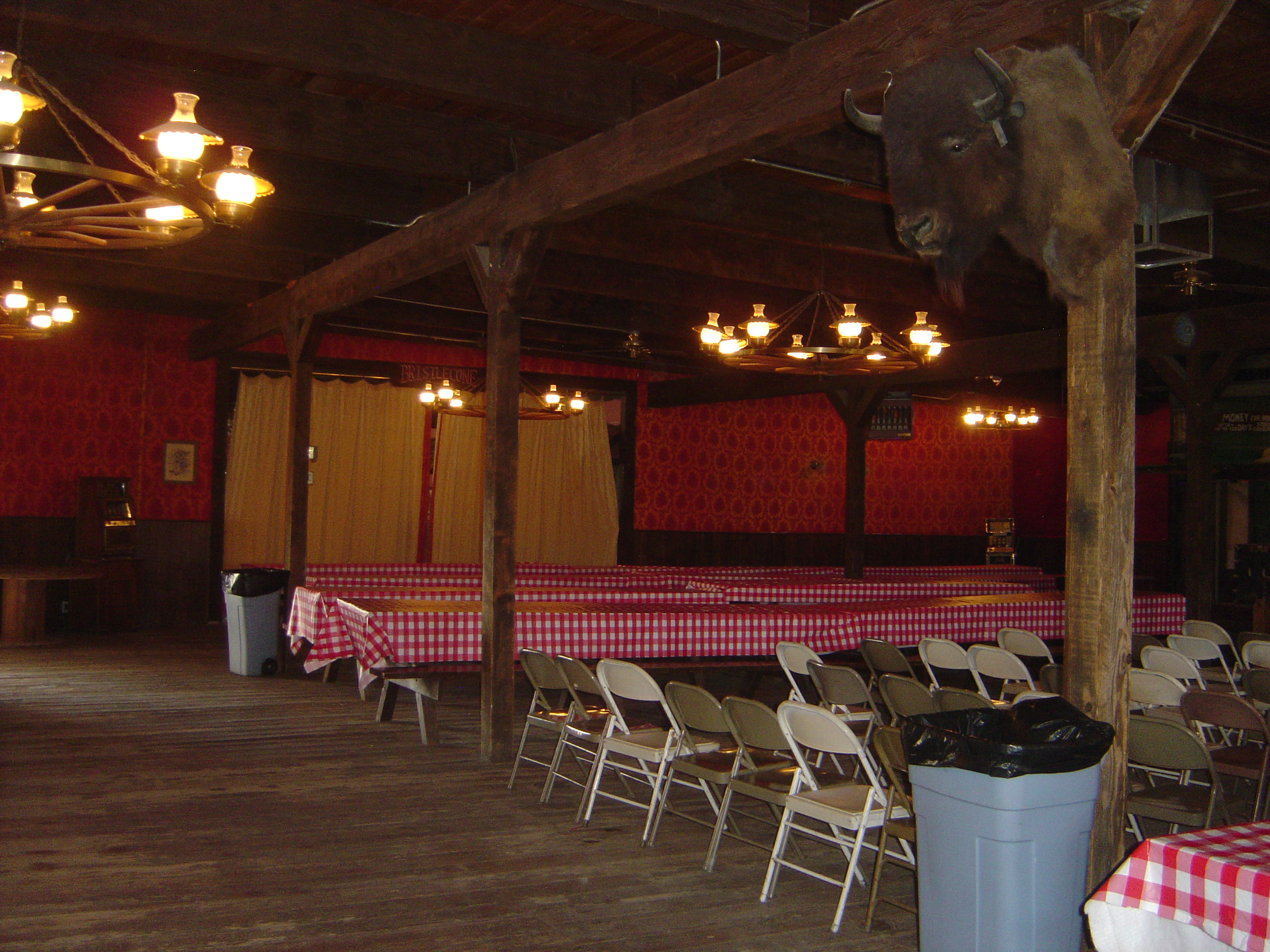
Old Nevada's saloon

By 1969, the Levinsons planned to construct a western village at the ranch. In 1972, construction began on Old Nevada, the name given to a series of buildings replicating an 1880s mining town, with an opening planned for early summer 1973. Al Levinson had wanted to construct Old Nevada for years.

Research was done to ensure the buildings' accuracy with old western structures. The buildings are made of old wood, which was sought by Al Levinson to replicate old mine town buildings. The Old Nevada buildings were built based on building plans for early western communities. The Levinsons traveled to various small towns in Nevada to obtain information about the local buildings, as research for Old Nevada. The design of Old Nevada's Methodist wedding chapel is based on a chapel located in Belmont, Nevada.

Al Levinson had acquired thousands of historic drawings and pictures of old buildings on which to base the design of Old Nevada. He also had research help from state agencies. Nevada mining camp ruins were also a model for Old Nevada. Despite the buildings' historic appearance, they were designed according to modern building codes and included air-conditioning. However, plumbing was only included in restaurants and bathrooms, while the front of other buildings included an outdoor water pump for historical accuracy. Antique telephones were repaired and connected to a switchboard as the only form of communication in Old Nevada. Sidewalks were made of wormwood planking that Al Levinson had imported from Oregon.

Built at a cost of $800,000, the Old Nevada western town opened on May 1, 1974 with 45 buildings, located on 5 acres (2.0 ha) of the ranch land. A restored 1881 horse-drawn carriage provided transportation around the town. At the time, Old Nevada included the Miner's Restaurant, a casino, and a miniature steam train, as well as a shootout show between a law official and a gunman, followed by a hanging.

Old Nevada also had shops which sold artifacts and antiques that had been collected by Al Levinson, while a western-style saloon included a 900-person capacity for group events such as parties. To increase visitor attendance to the ranch, the saloon began featuring a vaudeville dinner show titled Bonnie's Old West Musical Revue, which ran on weekends from May to August 2012. Later that year, the show moved to the Plaza Hotel & Casino in downtown Las Vegas, where it was performed under the title Grand Ole Vegas Revue. The saloon later featured karaoke and live music on two separate days a week. As of 2013, Old Nevada included the wedding chapel, the saloon, and a small schoolhouse. Staged gun fights and souvenir shops remained a part of Old Nevada as well. Old Nevada also had two museums, featuring local artifacts and 1800s-era wax figures.

=== Zoo ===
In 1975, Bonnie Levinson took in two pygmy goats from Wayne Newton. In addition, someone had dropped off a sheep at the ranch; this was accompanied by the arrival of two deer and Levinson's adoption of a wolf. Levinson, an animal lover, also had cats, dogs, chickens and rabbits, many of which were left at the ranch by uninterested pet owners. The multitude of animals inspired Levinson to build a petting zoo at the ranch for children. The petting zoo had opened by 1985. The zoo was added to increase family visitation to the ranch.

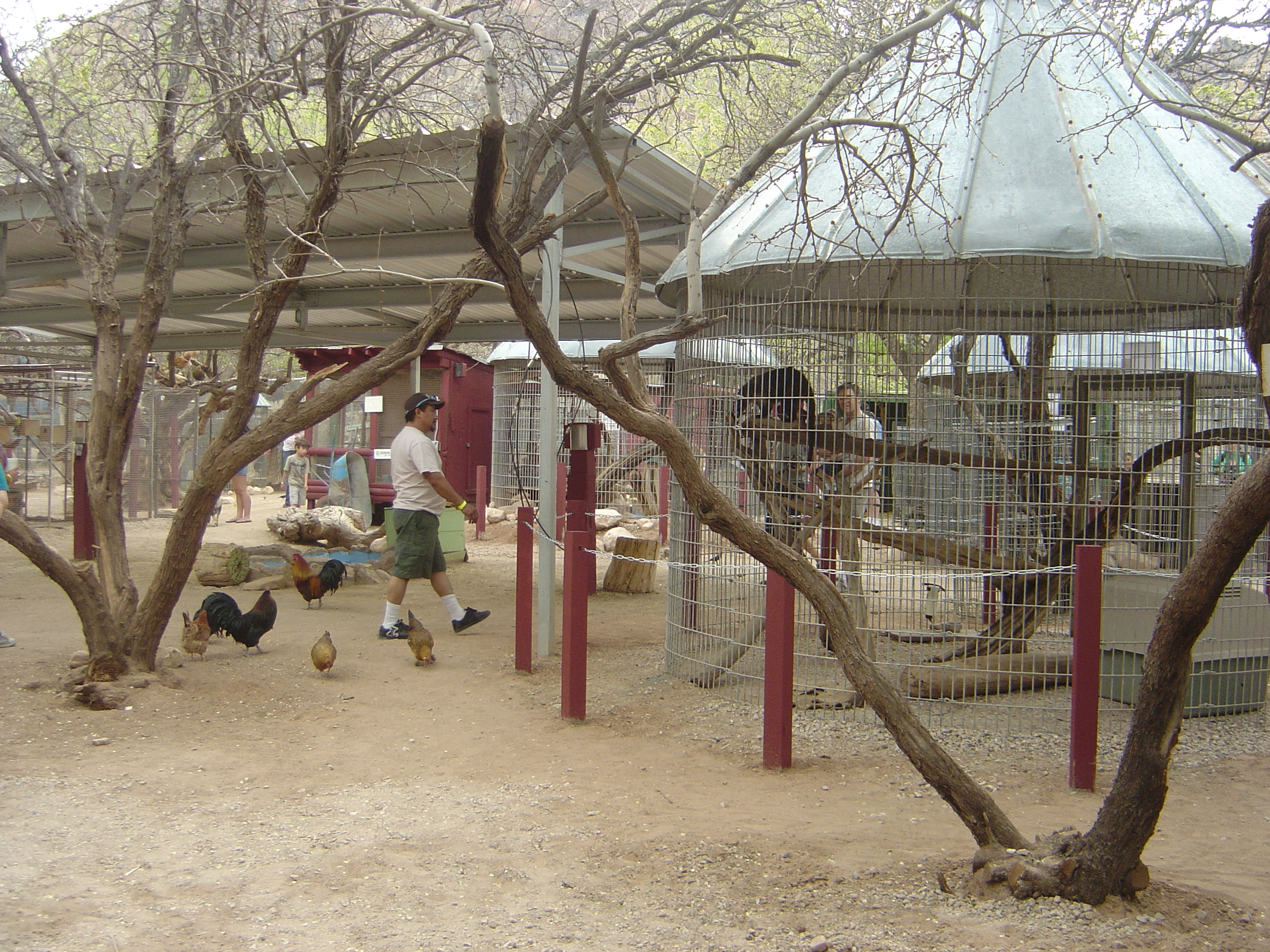
The zoo at Bonnie Springs

By 1997, the zoo included bobcats, burros, coatimundi and lynx, coyotes, ferrets, hedgehogs, llamas, porcupines, prairie dogs, squirrels, turtles, and a woodchuck. Emus would also be added to the zoo, including one that had been abandoned in the desert. Peacocks and deer freely roamed the fenced zoo area. The ranch also featured a large stable of horses. Levinson raised several of the animals. Most of the zoo was occupied by rescued animals who had been mistreated. The petting zoo included goats, deer, sheep, and buffalo. Some of the animals could naturally withstand the local heat, while others had covered enclosures with misters and bodies of water. To stay cool, the animals were also regularly given ice packs.

As of 2012, the zoo had been entirely renovated with new enclosures. As of 2015, the zoo had four full-time zookeepers, one part-time zookeeper, and several volunteers. As of 2017, the zoo had more than 20 animal species, including more than 70 peacocks. Some of the zoo's animals would be kept by the Levinson family following the ranch's closure, while others would be relocated to zoos in Nevada and California.

== Paranormal ==
The ranch has been speculated to be haunted, as claimed by some visitors to the ranch. Tim Harrison, the ranch's marketing director and events manager, said in 2016, "We were the hub of wagon trains that came through and people camped here and a lot of people died on the way. We believe those spirits still exist and are concentrated in our opera house – that's where they gather and most of the energy is felt." He later said in 2017, "There's a little girl by the school house, several apparitions at the opera house. You hear all kinds of stuff."

Each October, from 2008 to 2018, the ranch was temporarily named "Bonnie Screams" in celebration of Halloween, with various haunted house attractions. In 2015, Bonnie Screams began offering a zombie-themed paintball game, Zombie Paintball Express, in which patrons rode a bus while attempting to fend off zombies with paintballs. As of 2015, a local paranormal society also offered a three-hour tour of the ranch's haunted areas during the last Saturday night of most months. The tours included efforts to make contact with the ranch's ghosts. Additional tours were offered during Bonnie Screams. The tours frequently included celebrities such as Susan Slaughter, from Ghost Hunters International.

== In popular culture ==
A music video for singer Lee Hye-young was shot at Bonnie Springs in 2000.

The motel was briefly featured in the 2005 film Domino. Director Tony Scott had long wanted to include the ranch in one of his films, and also stayed at the ranch's motel.

Bonnie Springs is featured as an abandoned town in the 2010 video game Fallout: New Vegas.

The ranch was featured as a lockdown location in a 2011 episode of Ghost Adventures. The series detected footsteps and sounds, as well as the presence of ghosts in empty rooms. The ranch was subsequently featured in a 2015 episode of Ghost Adventures: Aftershocks.

The ranch is also featured in "The Good, the Bad, and the Punished", a 2016 episode of Impractical Jokers.

In 2017, the ranch was used as a filming location for the Asian television series Farewell, Las Vegas.

Bonnie Springs Ranch was featured as one of the haunted locations in the Paranormal TV series, Most Terrifying Places in America in an episode titled "Devil's Playground" which aired on the Travel Channel in 2018.

== See also ==
- Tourist attractions in Clark County, Nevada
- Old Vegas
