= Red Rock Canyon National Conservation Area =

National conservation area in Nevada, US

- IUCN category V (protected landscape/seascape)
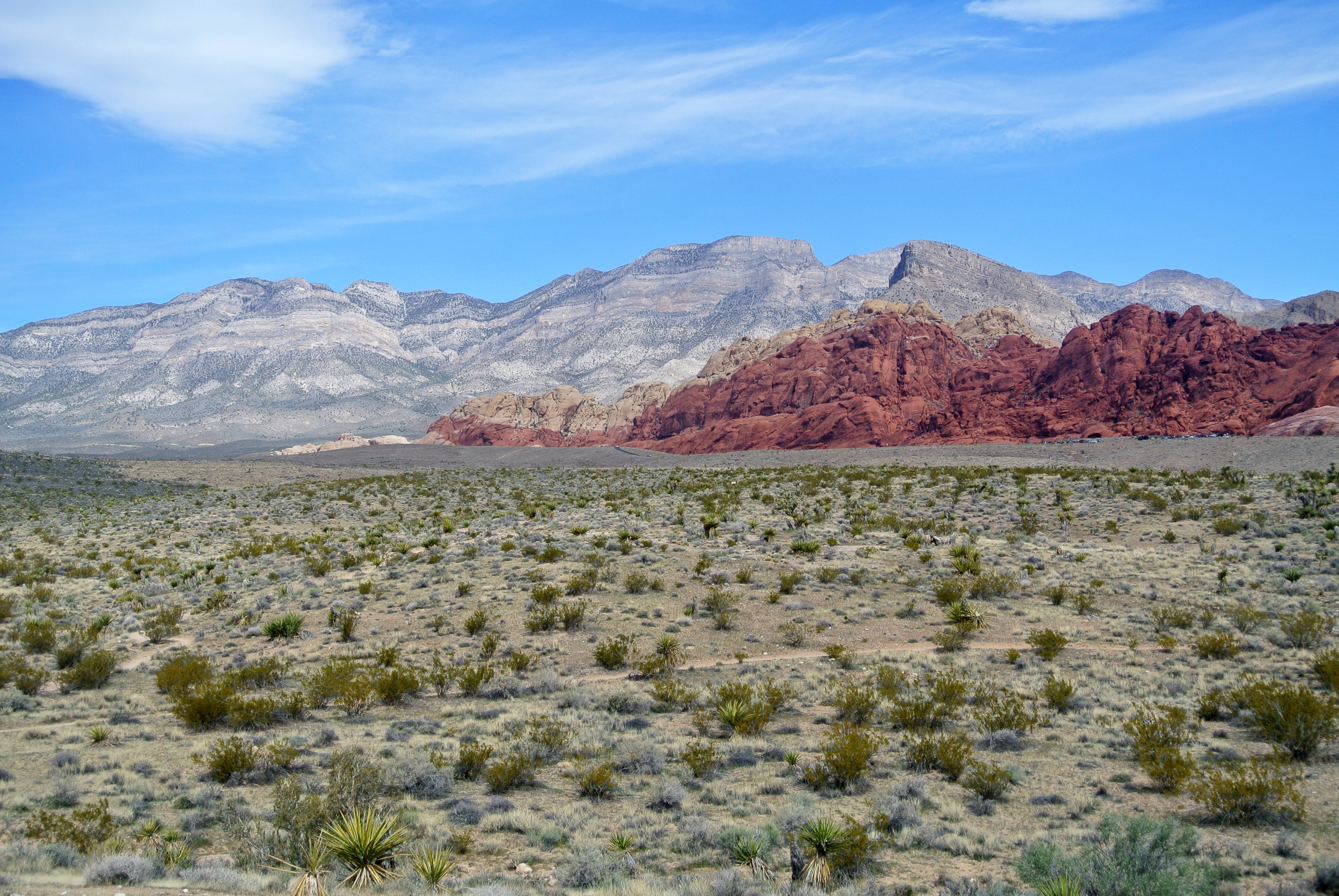
- Red Rock Canyon National Conservation Area view

- Location within Nevada
- Location: Clark County, Nevada, US
- Nearest city: Las Vegas, Nevada
- Coordinates: 36°08′08″N 115°25′38″W
- Area: 197,349 acres (798.64 km^{2})
- Established: 1967
- Visitors: 2,000,000+
- Governing body: Bureau of Land Management

The Red Rock Canyon National Conservation Area in Clark County, Nevada, United States, is an area managed by the Bureau of Land Management as part of its National Landscape Conservation System, and protected as a National Conservation Area. It is about 15 miles (24 km) west of Las Vegas. More than three million people visit the area each year.

The conservation area showcases a set of large red rock formations: a set of sandstone peaks and walls that were formed by thrust faults including the Keystone Thrust. The walls are up to 3,000 feet (910 m) high, making them a popular hiking and rock climbing destination. The highest point is La Madre Mountain, at 8,154 feet (2,485 m).

A one-way, loop road, 13 miles (21 km) long, provides vehicle access to many of the features in the area. Several side roads and parking areas allow access to many of the area trails. A visitor center is at the start of the loop road. The loop road is also popular for bicycle touring; it begins with a moderate climb, then is mostly downhill or flat.

The Rocky Gap Road in Red Rock Canyon NCA is a side canyon accessible only by an unmaintained primitive road from the scenic loop which mostly only off-road or high-clearance vehicles can access. State Route 159 cuts through the Cottonwood Valley, also a side trail of the Old Spanish Trail. The Wilson Cliffs, a massive escarpment, can be seen to the west from SR 159.

Toward the southern end of the National Conservation Area are Spring Mountain Ranch State Park; the town of Blue Diamond; and Bonnie Springs Ranch, which includes a replica of a western ghost town, but which in 2019 was sold and closed to the public.

== History ==
=== Native Americans ===
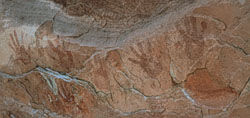
Pictographs in Red Rock Canyon

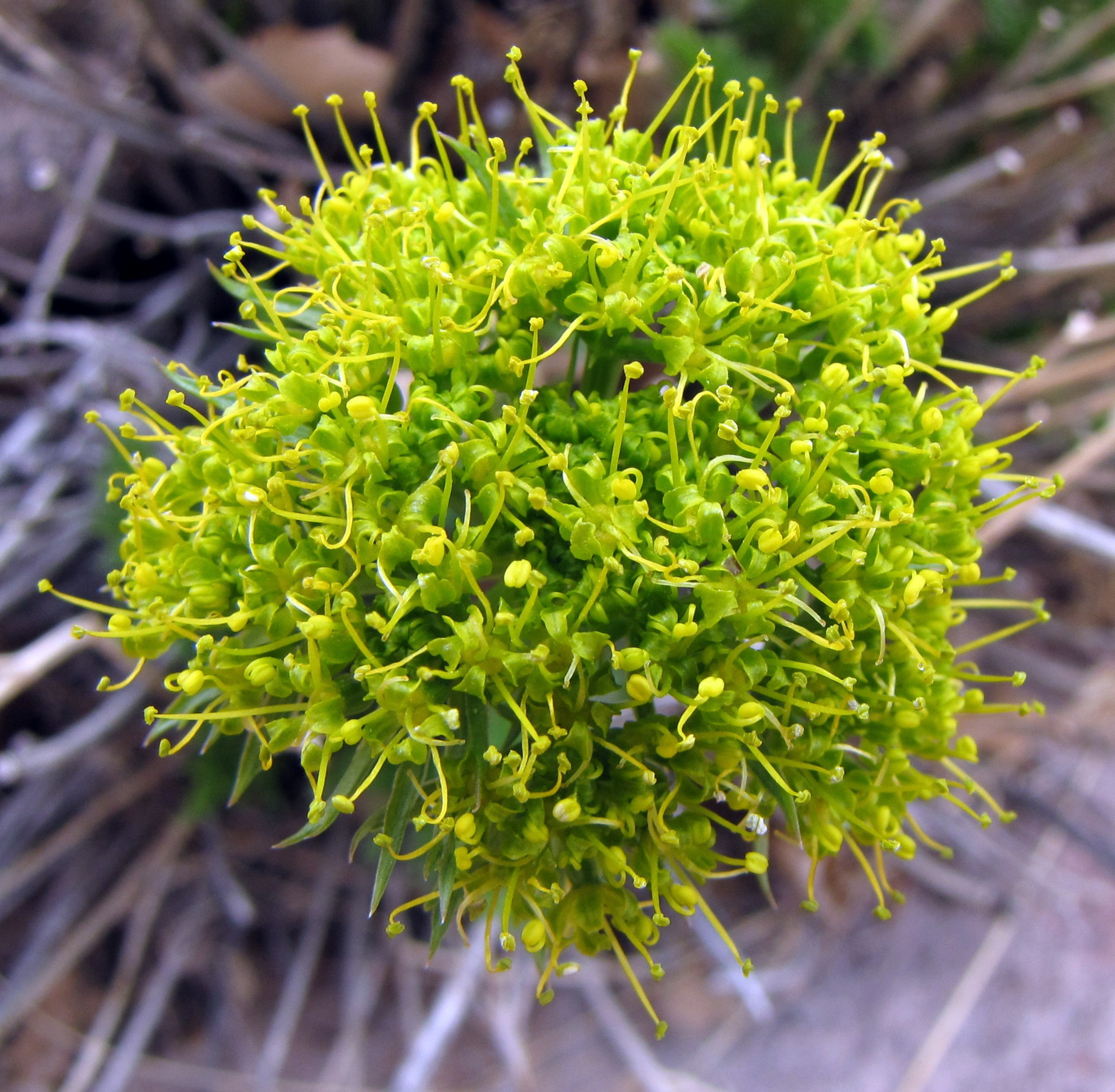
Lomatium parryi, a common plant consumed by early Native Americans

The first humans were attracted to the Red Rock area due to its resources of water, plant, and animal life that could not be easily found in the surrounding desert. Hunters and gatherers such as the historical Southern Paiute and the much older Archaic, or Desert Culture Native Americans, have successively occupied this area.

As many as six different Native American cultures may have been present at Red Rock over the millennia. The following chronology is an approximation, from the present to ancient pre-history:

- Southern Paiute: 900 to modern times
- Patayan Culture: 900 to early historic times in the 1800s
- Ancestral Puebloan: 1 AD to 1150
- Pinto/Gypsum: (Archaic) 3500 BC to 1 AD
- San Dieguito: 7000 to 5500 BC
- Paleo-Indians (Tule Springs): 11,000 to 8000 BC

Numerous petroglyphs, as well as pottery fragments, remain today throughout the area. In addition, several roasting pits used by the early Native Americans at Red Rock provide further evidence of human activity in the past.

=== Modern history ===
In the early 20th century, around the time the first European Americans settled in nearby Las Vegas, the Excelsior Company operated a small sandstone quarry near the northern area of the scenic loop. It proved to be uneconomical and was shut down. Evidence of the quarry's existence includes some of the huge sandstone blocks that have been left behind.

The Red Rocks have been a film location for such movies as Roy Rogers and his horse Trigger in Bells of San Angelo (1947) and was a location for The Stalking Moon with Gregory Peck in 1968.

In 1967, the Bureau of Land Management designated 10,000 acres (16 sq mi; 40 km^{2}) as the Red Rock Recreation Lands. In 1973, the U.S. House of Representatives subcommittee on Federal Conservation Areas held a special hearing in the Foley Federal Office Building in downtown Las Vegas to review a legislative resolution sponsored by Nevada's lone Congressman, David Towell (R-NV) to establish the Red Rock Conservation Area by transferring Federal land to the State of Nevada. Testimony in favor of the bill was given by the Sierra Club and a high school student and environmental activist, Dennis Causey. The subcommittee unanimously approved the resolution, sending it to the full Committee on the Interior and subsequently to the full House, followed by favorable action by the U S. Senate and approval by President George H. W. Bush. Further legislation in 1990 changed the status of the Red Rock Recreation Lands to a National Conservation Area, a status that also provides funds to maintain and protect it. The Federal area was adjacent to the Red Rock State Park.

The Howard Hughes Corporation, developer of Summerlin, has transferred land adjacent to the protected area, to provide a buffer between the development and the conservation area. Red Rock Canyon National Conservation Area is adjacent to the Spring Mountains National Recreation Area on the west side.

== Biology ==
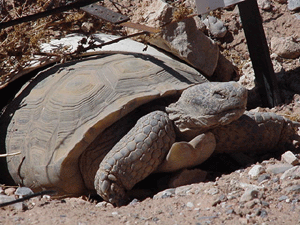
Mojave Max, a desert tortoise

The conservation area is one of the easternmost parts of the Mojave Desert; the lowest elevation of the area, from 3,600 to 4,500 feet (1,100 to 1,400 m), is in the Lower Sonoran Zone, while the area from 4,500 feet (1,400 m) up is in the Upper Sonoran Zone. The character of the sandstone layers is such that several year-round springs may be found in the recesses of the side canyons.

Some 600 species of plants are known in the area. Common types in the valley floor include the Joshua tree, Mojave yucca, banana yucca, creosote, and blackbrush. Higher up the Utah juniper and Sonoran scrub oak (also called scrub live oak) come to dominate. Agave is easy to spot in red rock niches, with its thick, low leaves and flowering stem reaching twice a man's height. The Calico Tanks trail has a plaque about prehistoric agave roasting pits. Ponderosa pines may be found at the top of the valley, where it connects to the Spring Mountains.

Wild burros are a familiar sight, as are rabbits and ground squirrels. Desert bighorn sheep are occasionally seen at higher elevations. During rare spring and summer rainstorms, tiny red-spotted toads can emerge from water pools.

The Conservation Area is a protected habitat for the desert tortoise. A habitat at the Visitor Center houses eight females and two males.

== Climate ==
Climate data for Spring Mountain Ranch State Park, Nevada (Elevation 3,870ft)
Month	Jan	Feb	Mar	Apr	May	Jun	Jul	Aug	Sep	Oct	Nov	Dec	Year
Record high °F (°C)	71 (22)	81 (27)	86 (30)	91 (33)	103 (39)	114 (46)	111 (44)	108 (42)	102 (39)	97 (36)	82 (28)	73 (23)	114 (46)
Mean daily maximum °F (°C)	53.0 (11.7)	56.8 (13.8)	63.7 (17.6)	71.0 (21.7)	80.3 (26.8)	91.2 (32.9)	96.7 (35.9)	94.8 (34.9)	87.7 (30.9)	76.1 (24.5)	62.1 (16.7)	53.4 (11.9)	73.9 (23.3)
Mean daily minimum °F (°C)	29.7 (−1.3)	32.9 (0.5)	38.4 (3.6)	44.3 (6.8)	52.9 (11.6)	63.6 (17.6)	70.7 (21.5)	68.5 (20.3)	59.3 (15.2)	47.3 (8.5)	35.9 (2.2)	29.5 (−1.4)	47.8 (8.8)
Record low °F (°C)	0 (−18)	0 (−18)	21 (−6)	19 (−7)	28 (−2)	38 (3)	45 (7)	45 (7)	32 (0)	26 (−3)	16 (−9)	3 (−16)	0 (−18)
Average precipitation inches (mm)	1.78 (45)	2.21 (56)	1.88 (48)	0.59 (15)	0.24 (6.1)	0.10 (2.5)	0.99 (25)	1.09 (28)	0.56 (14)	0.52 (13)	0.75 (19)	0.92 (23)	11.64 (296)
Average snowfall inches (cm)	0.8 (2.0)	0.7 (1.8)	0.3 (0.76)	0.1 (0.25)	0 (0)	0 (0)	0 (0)	0 (0)	0 (0)	0 (0)	0.1 (0.25)	0.7 (1.8)	2.6 (6.6)
Source: The Western Regional Climate Center

== Geology ==
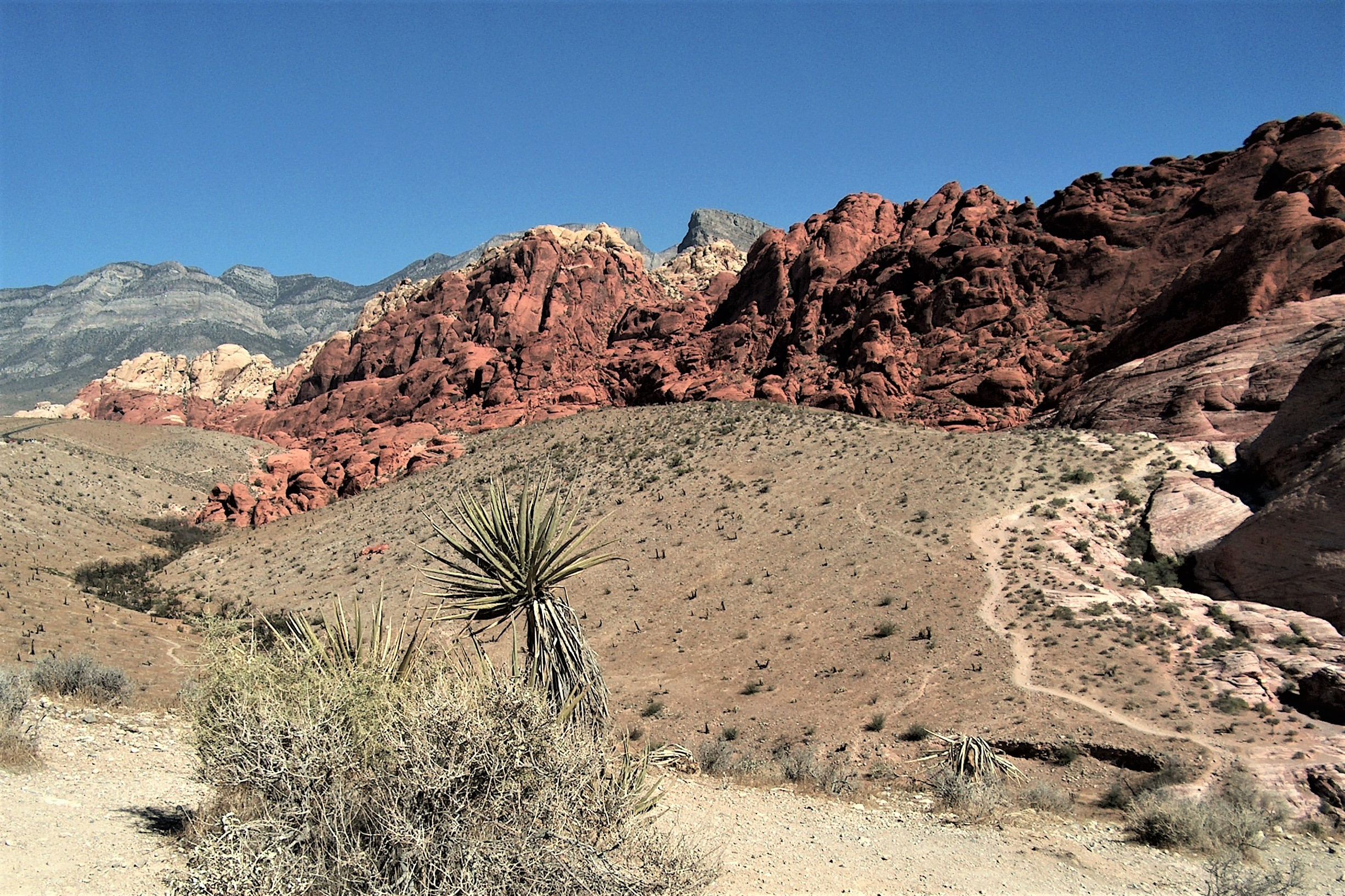
Red Rock Canyon – Calico Hills trail

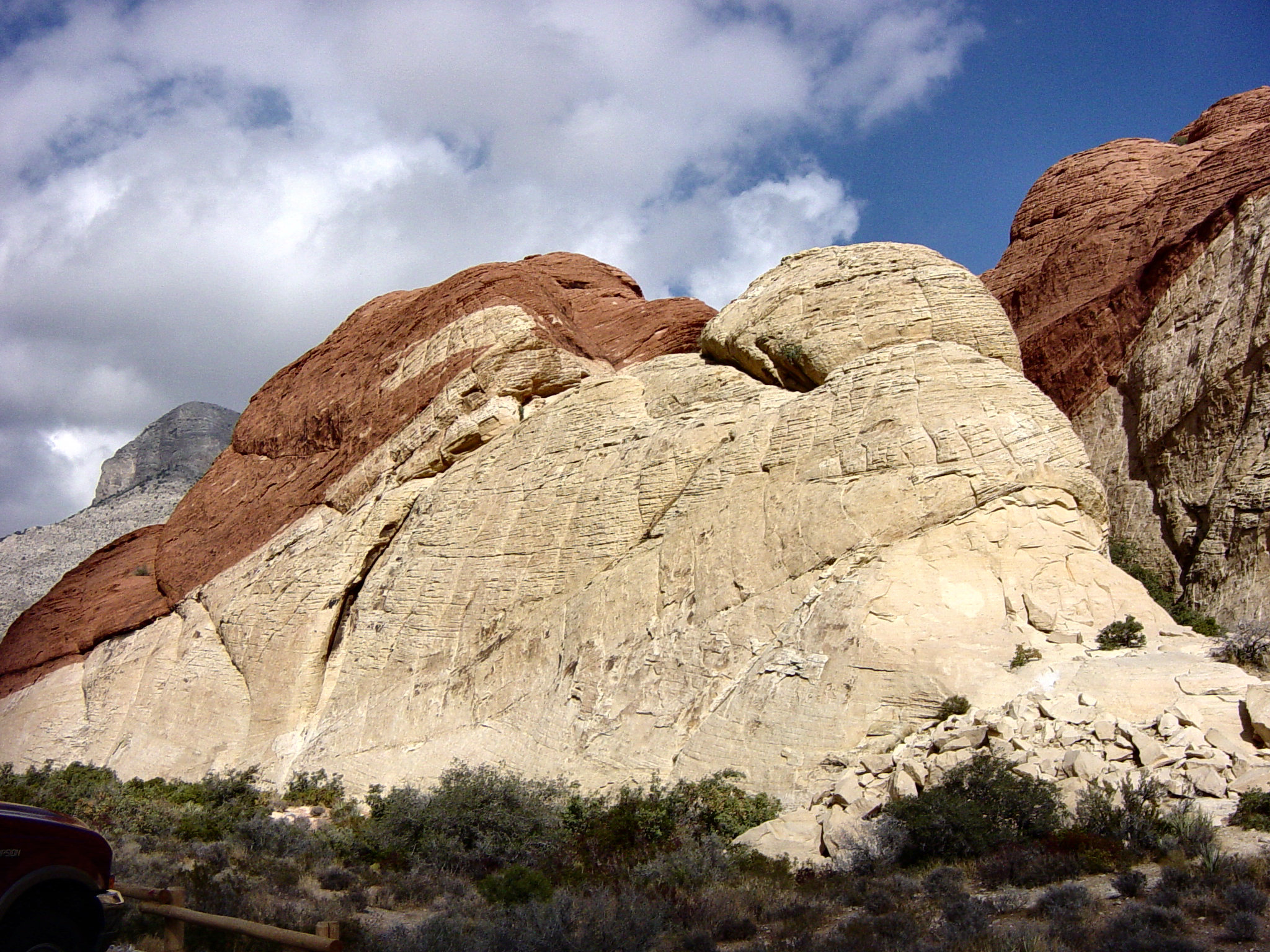
An outcrop of Aztec Sandstone

The Red Rock area has a complex geological history, which over millions of years, helped create the region's dramatic landscape.

The Red Rock area was under an ocean basin during the Paleozoic Era 600 million years ago. Up to 9,000 feet (2,700 m) of limey sediments were deposited and eventually lithified to limestone. During the Mesozoic Era 250 million years ago, the Earth's crust started to rise due to tectonic shifts, and marine shales and sandstones were deposited. As the basin became isolated evaporite formations of salt and gypsum were deposited. Oxidation of the iron minerals in the sediments resulted in the red colors of some of the rocks. Deposition by streams and in swamp environments resulted in the formation of petrified wood in the area.

By 180 million years ago, the climate continued to change and the area became a desert with vast expanses of huge shifting sand dunes. These dunes accumulated over a broad area, up to 0.5 miles (0.80 km) thick, and were lithified, cemented with calcium carbonate and iron oxides. They developed as the colorful Aztec Sandstone.

During a mountain-building period called the Laramide orogeny around 66 million years ago, the Keystone Thrust Fault developed. The Keystone is part of a series of thrust faults that ran through much of western North America and the Red Rock Conservation Area. The movement of this fault forced the older gray sedimentary rock over the younger red rocks, forming the varicolored landscape that can be seen in the mountain today. The thrust is exposed over a distance of 13 miles (21 km) along the Red Rock escarpment.

The Lee Canyon thrust plate may contain over 4,000 ft (1,200 m) of terrigenous rocks at the base. The Wheeler Pass thrust may contain at least 11,000 ft (3,300 m) of these rocks as well.

== Recreational activities ==
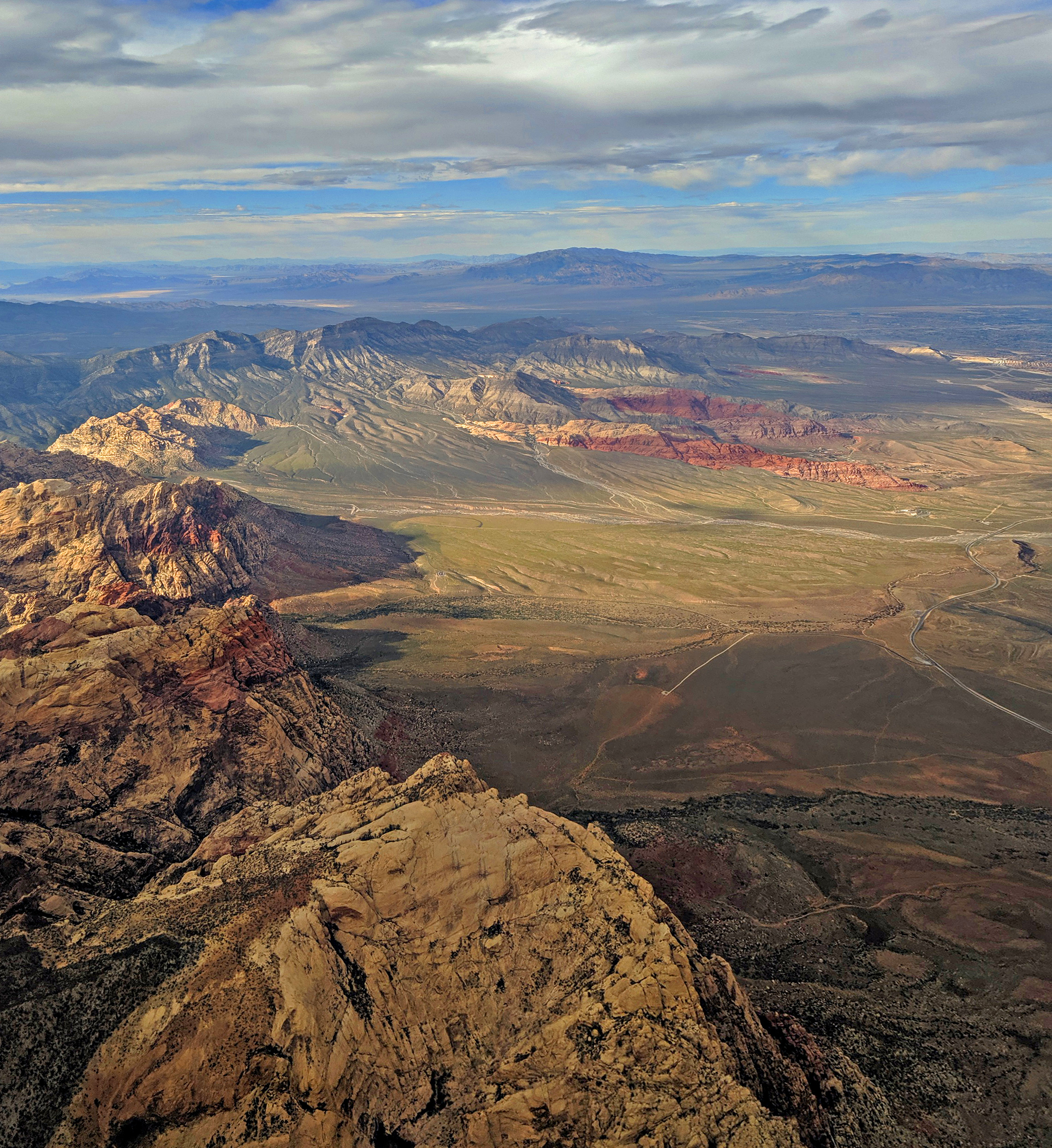
Aerial view of the Red Rock Canyon National Conservation Area near Las Vegas, Nevada, looking northeast

Red Rock provides a wide variety of recreational activities, the most popular being hiking, biking, rock scrambling, and rock climbing. Horseback riding and camping are also allowed on specific trails and in designated areas. Automobile (Flat4LV) and motorcycle (Roughriders) clubs often conduct group drives through the 13-mile scenic drive. ATV use is not permitted in the area.

Aside from the dangers of climbing rock faces and cliffs, visitors are informed that temperatures can routinely exceed 105 °F (41 °C) in the summer, so they must bring plenty of water. Visitors hiking into the backcountry off established trails are advised against traveling alone and should inform other people of their plans. Risks include the presence of venomous rattlesnakes and flash flooding/lightning from thunderstorms.

=== Rock climbing ===
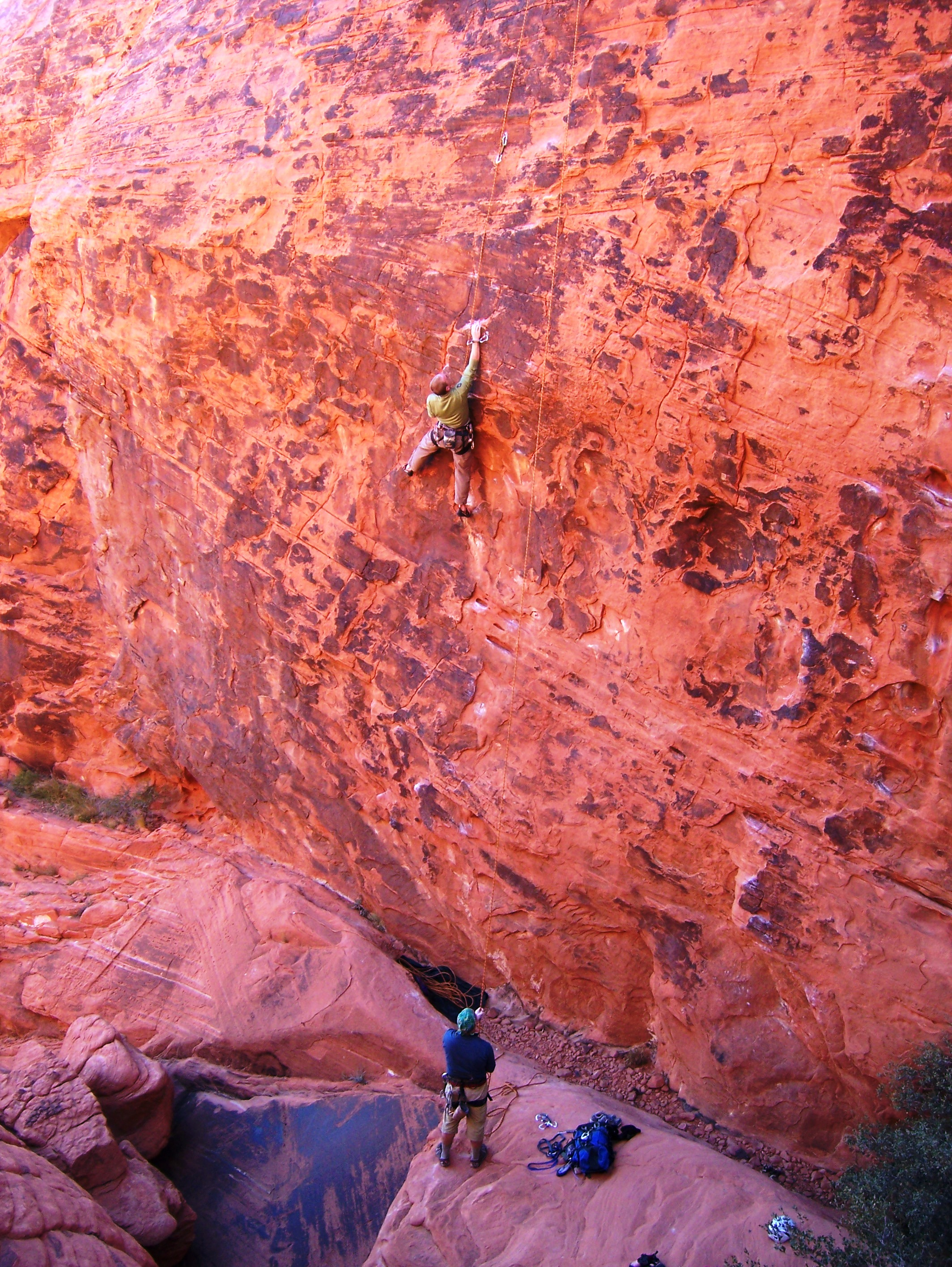
Climbers at the second pullout of the scenic loop

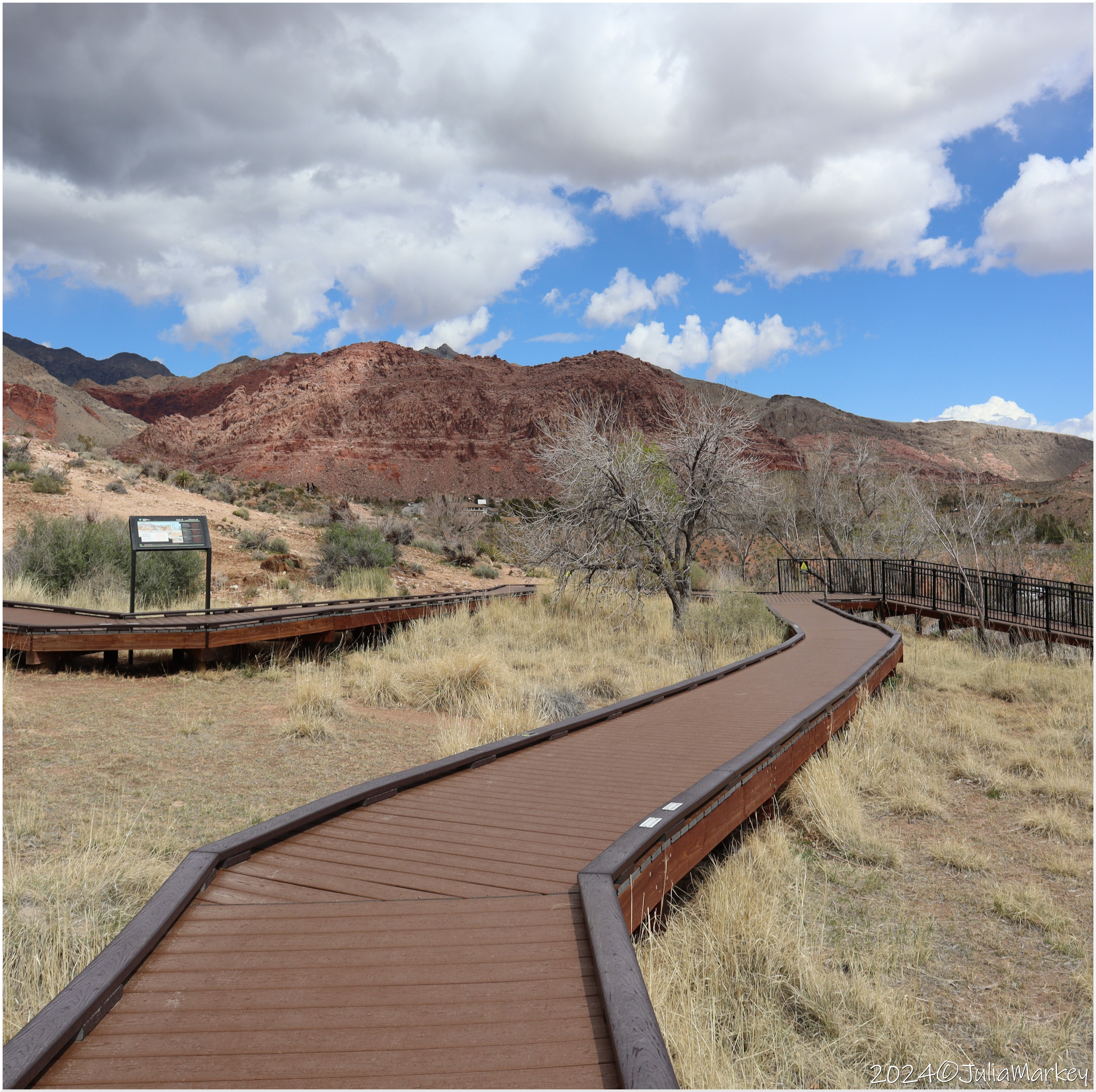
Red Springs Desert Oasis interpretive boardwalk at Red Rock Canyon National Conservation Area

Although the Yosemite-size walls offer a host of challenging lines, technical climbing activity in Red Rock was not recorded before 1968. The first modern routes, climbed in the early 1970s, are described in several books. The rock is Aztec Sandstone, a relatively solid variety with hard surface varnish. Many climbs involve ascents of single crack systems hundreds of feet long.

The climbs of Red Rock cover a broad range of length and difficulty. The long, easy routes had made the area a common climbing training ground, but the canyon also offers many difficult climbs as well. In recent decades, this broad appeal and the classic nature of many routes have made the area an international destination for rock climbers.

Popular sport climbing areas include the Calico Hills and Sandstone Quarry. Red Rock has a multitude of traditional climbing areas, including single-pitch areas such as Brass Wall and Necromancer Wall, along with multi-pitch areas such as Eagle Wall, Aeolian Wall, Mescalito, and Solar Slab. Long free and big-wall aid routes are found on features such as the Rainbow Wall and Buffalo Wall. Bouldering is popular in Red Rock as well, primarily at the Kraft Boulders and Black Velvet Canyon.

=== Hiking ===
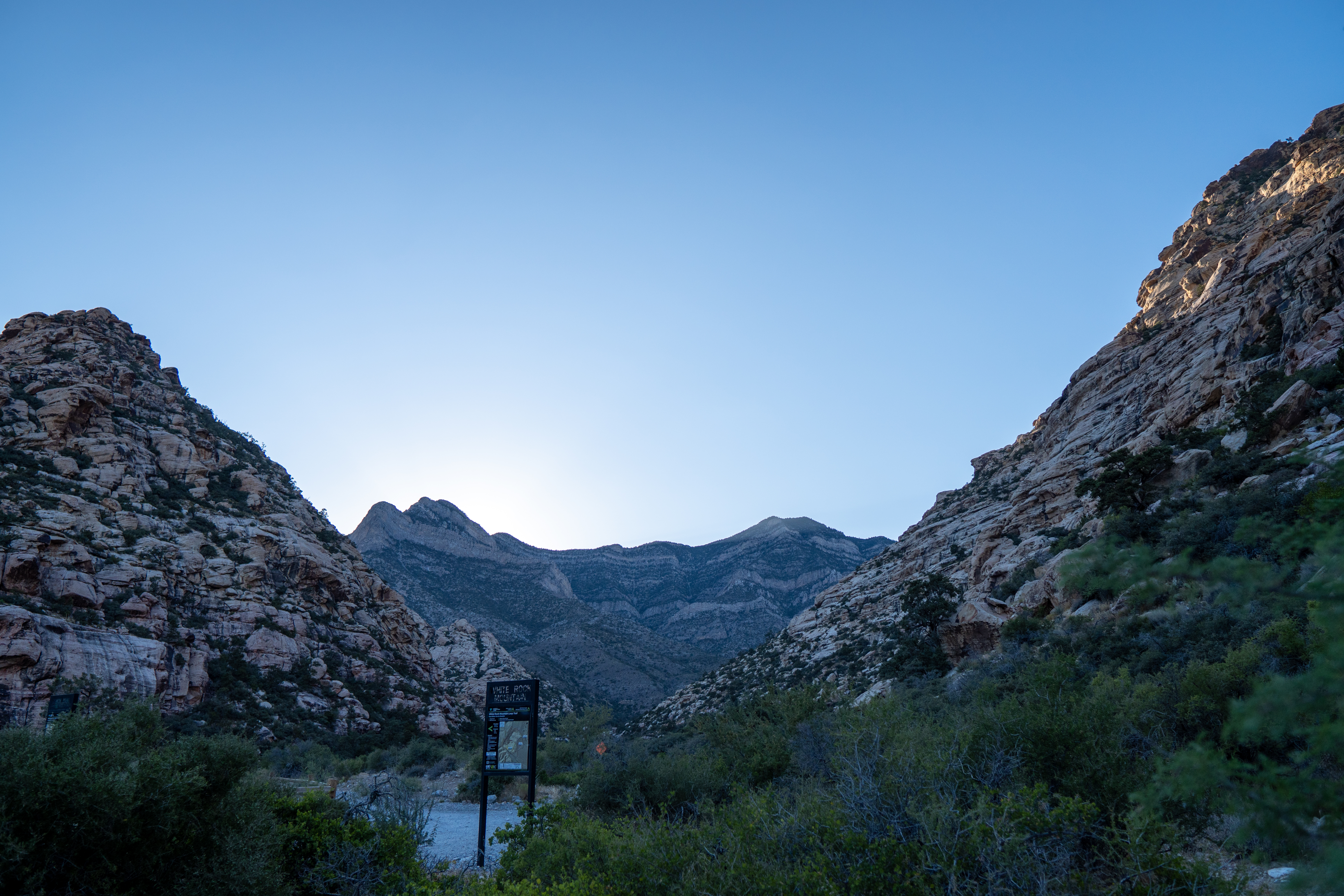
White Rock Mountain Loop Trail, one of the many trails that can be seen by visitors to Red Rock

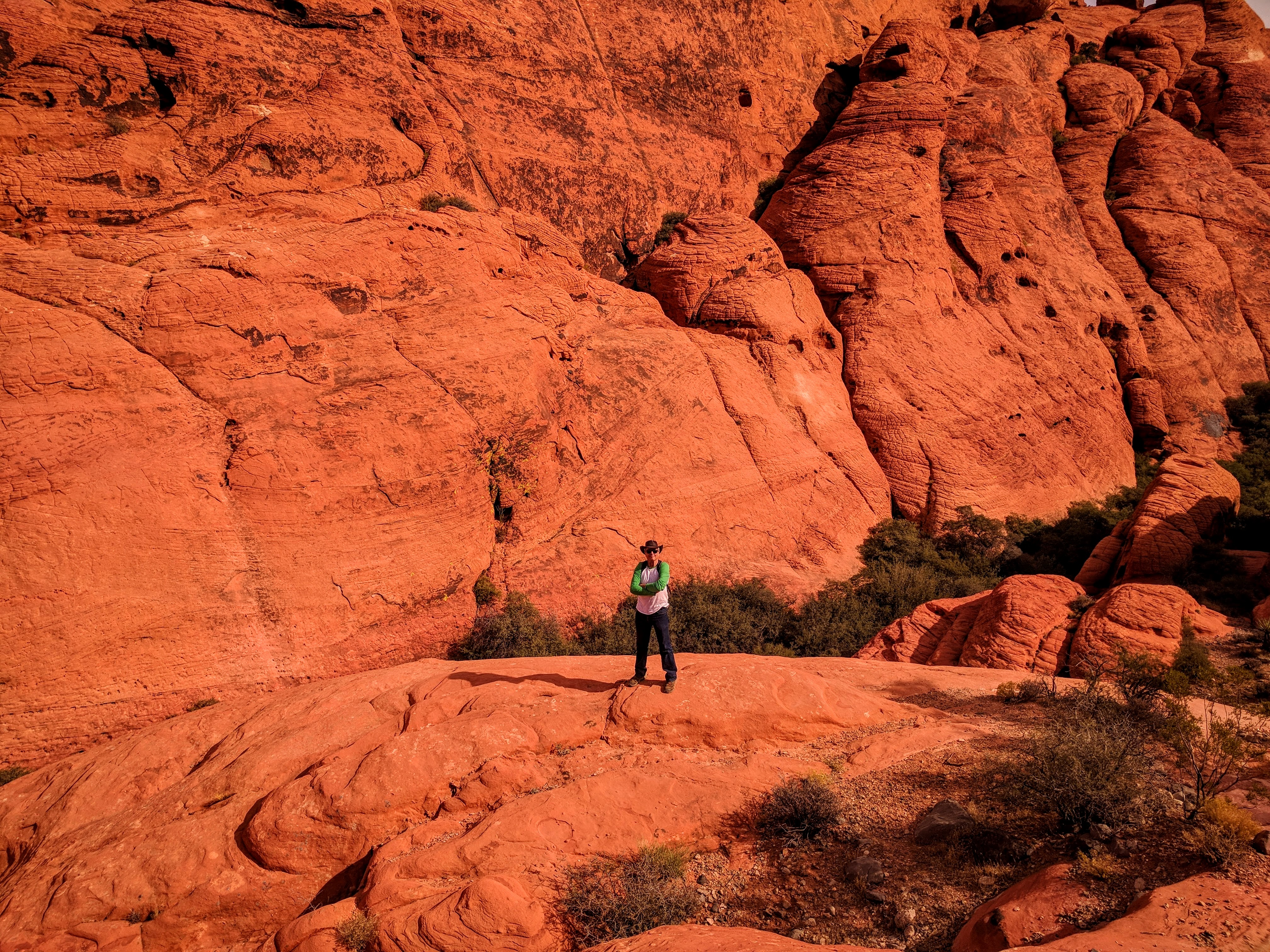
A hiker on the Grand Circle Loop Trail in Red Rock Canyon National Conservation Area

Red Rock has hiking trails and picnic areas. Trails are changed and diverted depending on the needs of the ecosystem. In early spring, depending upon the precipitation, waterfalls may be seen on the edge of the canyons. Popular trails within the vicinity of the scenic drive loop include the Moenkopi Loop, Calico Hills, Calico Tanks, Turtlehead Mountain, Keystone Thrust, White Rock/La Madre Springs Loop, and the Ice Box Canyon trail.

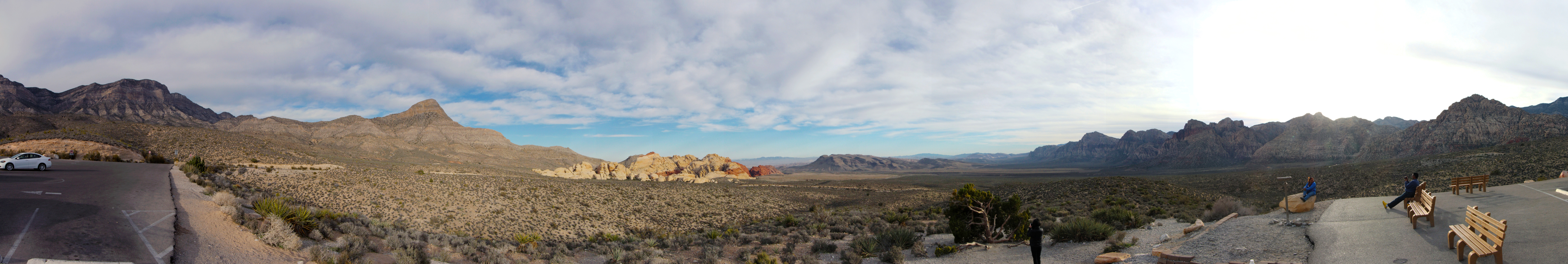
View from High Point Overlook

== Wildfire history ==
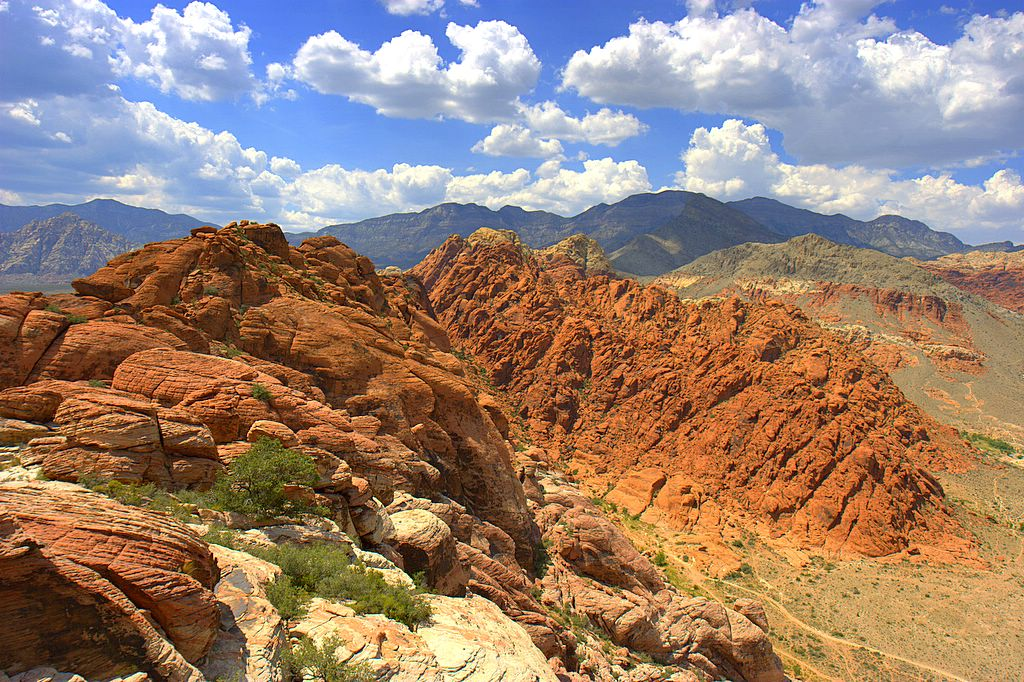
Calico Basin in Red Rock Canyon

Several significant wildfires have burned within the Red Rock Canyon NCA in recent years, including:

- 1998 – A fire occurred in the loop area. By 2003, regrowth has made it difficult to find the burn area.
- June 25, 2005 – The Goodsprings fire consumed more than 31,600 acres (49.4 sq mi; 128 km^{2}), burning into Red Rock NCA's southern area.
- July 22, 2005 – Lightning caused an 800-acre (1.3 sq mi; 3.2 km^{2}) fire in the loop area.
- September 6, 2006 – Another fire was started by lightning in the loop near the visitor center and burned around 1,500 acres (2.3 sq mi; 6.1 km^{2}).
- July 2013 – The Carpenter I fire burned mainly in the Spring Mountains National Recreation Area, but encroached on the northwest portion of Red Rock Canyon National Conservation Area. It was caused by lightning in Trout Canyon nearby.

Damage caused by wildfires, as well as evidence of the ability of the desert to heal itself over time, is visible from the loop road.

Recent fires were in part fueled by the thick growth of invasive species red brome and cheat grasses. The Bureau of Land Management has not developed plans to control these species, because control methods, such as using herbicides, can be costly and damaging to native plants.

== In popular culture ==
Red Rock Canyon appears in the 2010 videogame Fallout: New Vegas, where it is depicted as home to a group known as the Great Khans.

== See also ==
- La Madre Mountains Wilderness
