= Sandstone Ranch (Nevada) =

- U.S. National Register of Historic Places
- U.S. Historic district
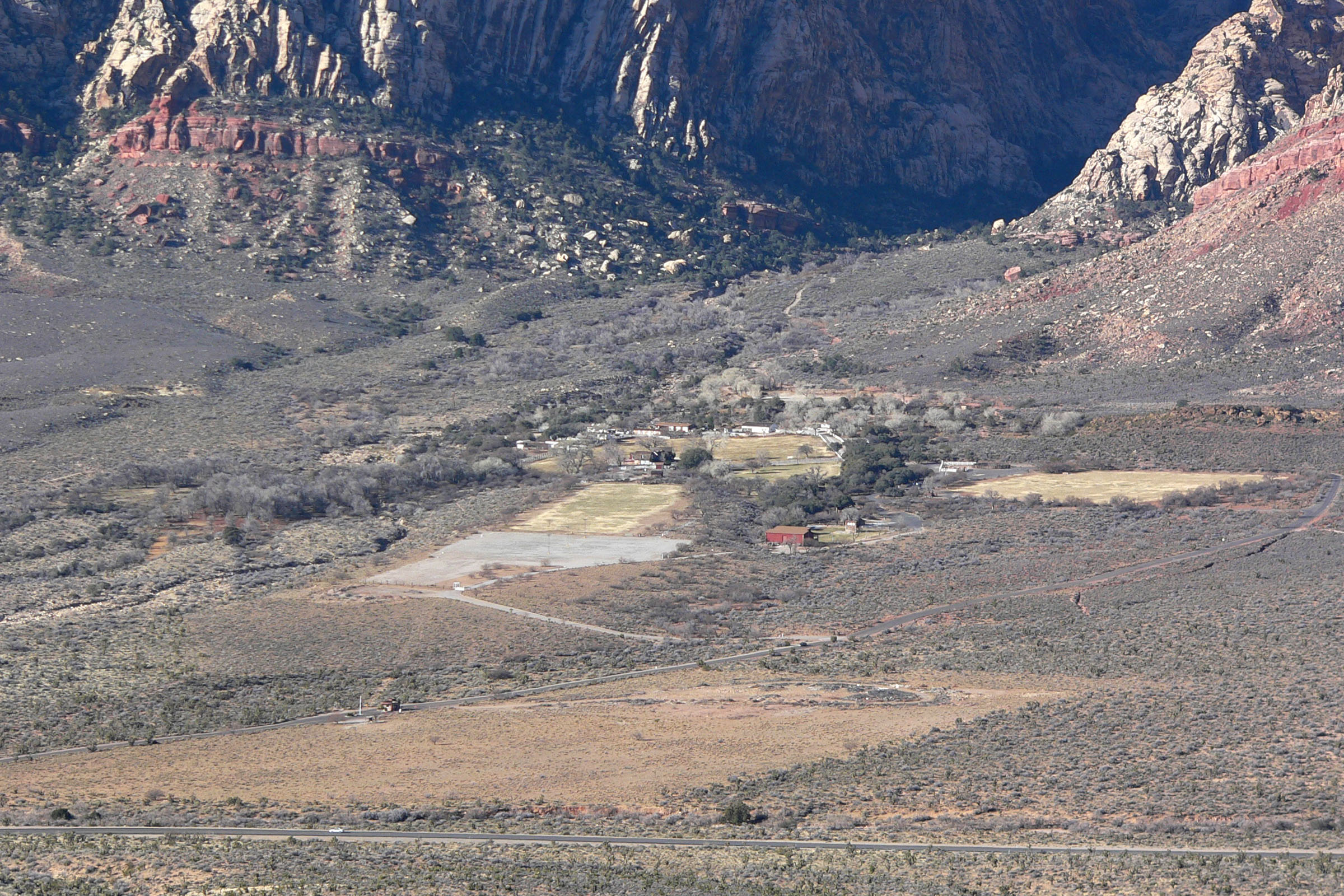

- Location within Nevada Location within the United States
- Location: Spring Mountain Ranch State Park, Clark County, Nevada, USA
- Nearest city: Las Vegas, Nevada
- Coordinates: 36°4′4″N 115°27′30″W
- Area: 520 acres (210 ha)
- NRHP reference No.: 76001141 (original); 100002337 (increase)

Significant dates
- Added to NRHP: April 02, 1976
- Boundary increase: April 25, 2019

Sandstone Ranch or Sand Stone Ranch, as it was first known, was listed on the United States National Register of Historic Places on April 2, 1976. The ranch is within the boundaries of the Spring Mountain Ranch State Park and Red Rock Canyon National Conservation Area and sits below the Wilson Range.

== History ==
The working cattle ranch was established in 1876 by Sergeant James B. Wilson and George Anderson. Over time it transformed from the working ranch to a retreat. Later owners included; Chester Lauck (1948), Vera Krupp (1955) and Howard Hughes.
