= Spring Mountain Ranch State Park =

State park in Nevada, United States

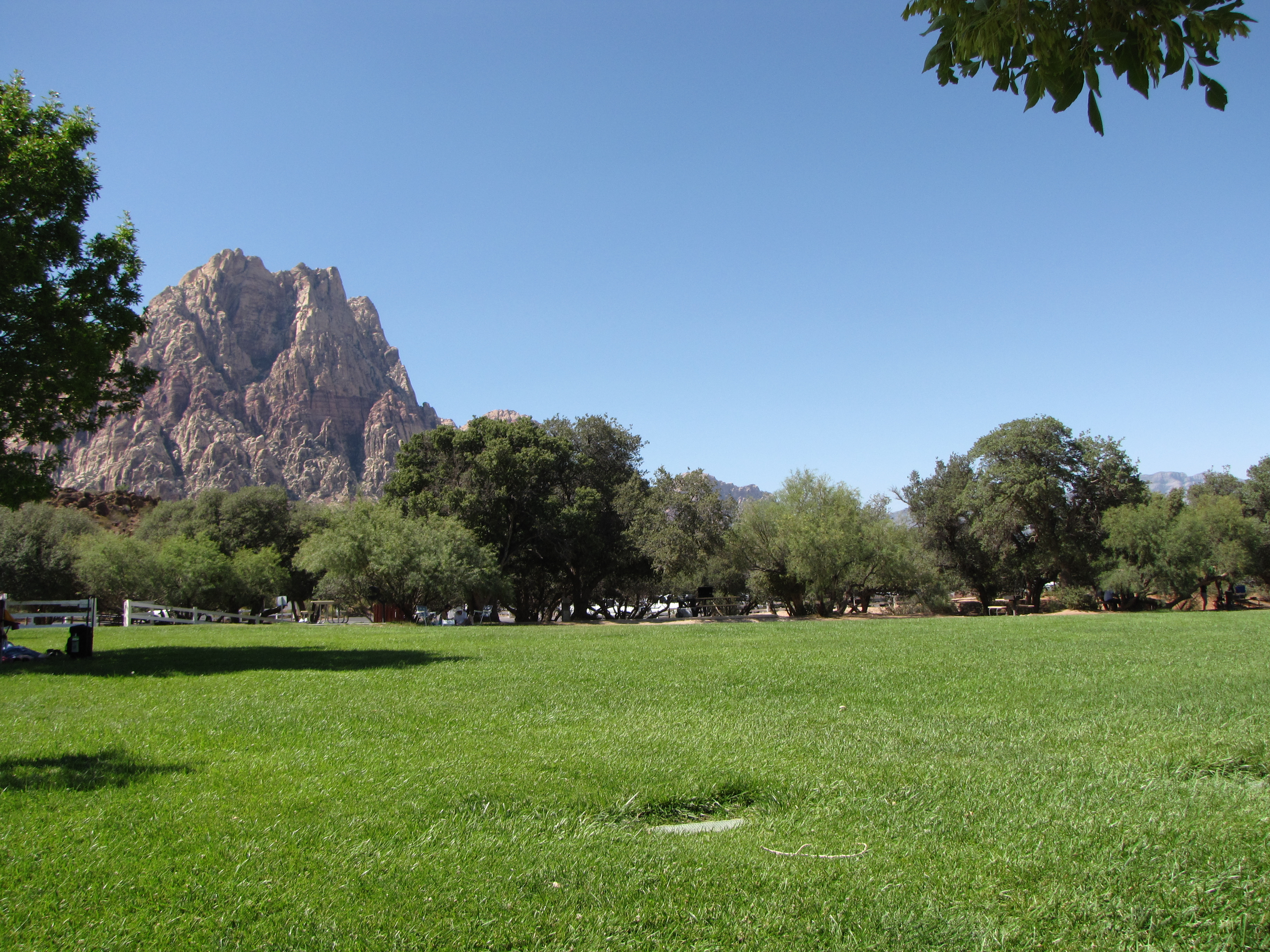

- Location within Nevada
- Location: Clark County, Nevada, United States
- Nearest city: Las Vegas, Nevada
- Coordinates: 36°04′11″N 115°27′2″W
- Area: 538.54 acres (217.94 ha)
- Elevation: 3,727 ft (1,136 m)
- Established: 1973
- Administrator: Nevada Division of State Parks
- Visitors: 51,098 vehicles (in 2017)
- Designation: Nevada state park
- Website: Official website
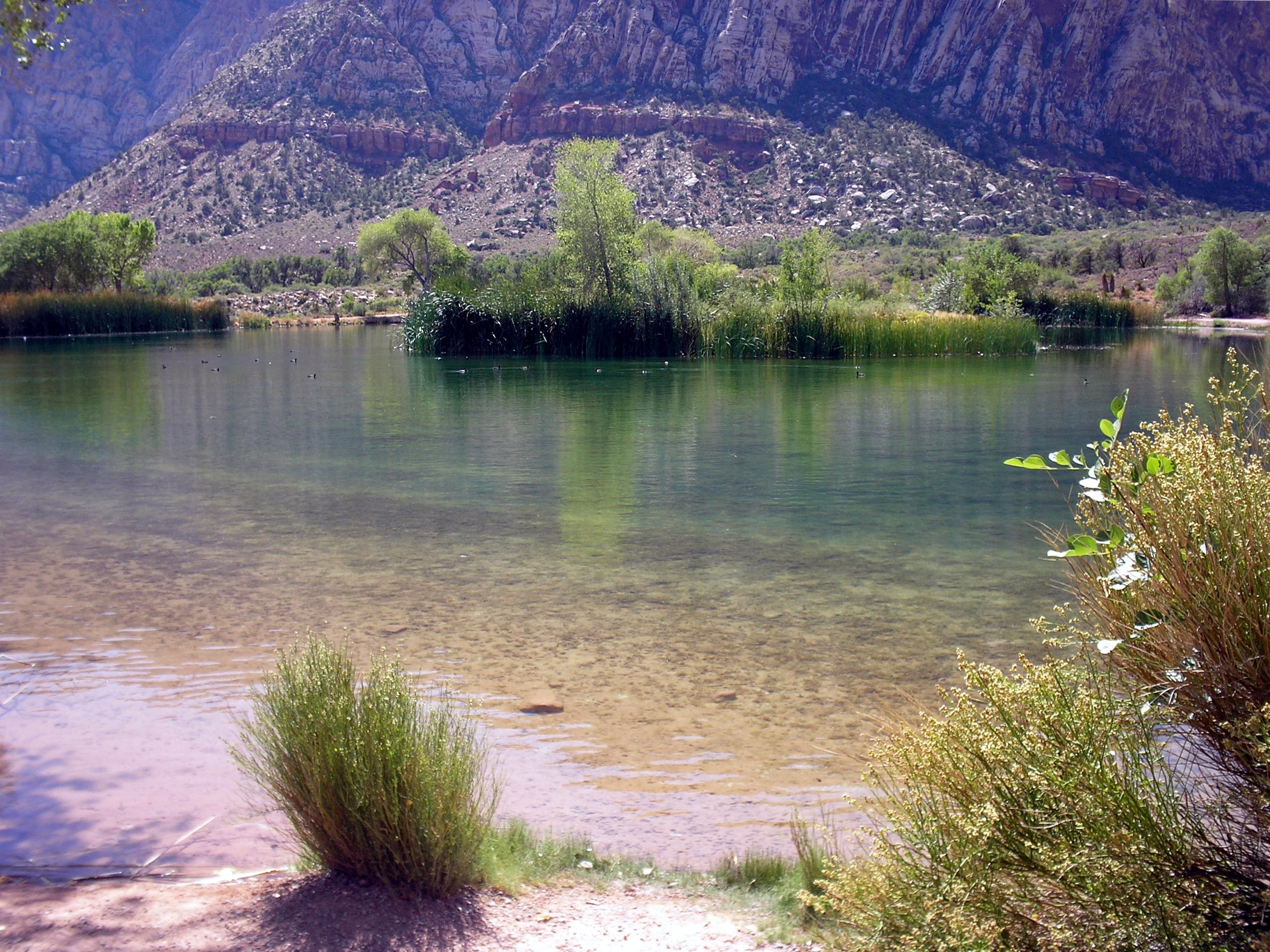
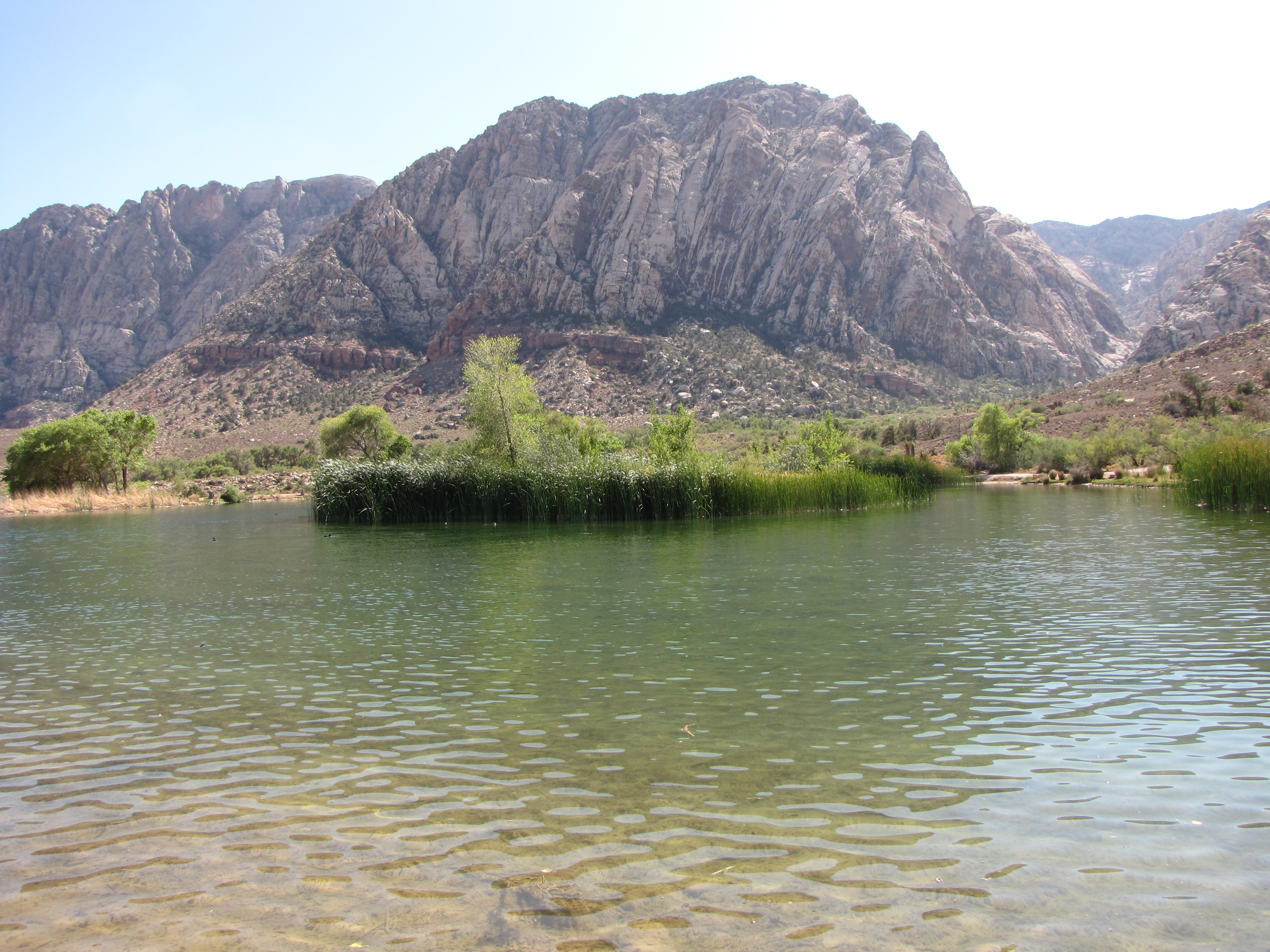
- 2008 2009 Lake Harriet reservoir

Spring Mountain Ranch State Park is a public recreation area located within the Red Rock Canyon National Conservation Area in Nevada's Cottonwood Valley, five miles (8.0 km) northwest of Blue Diamond, Nevada. The state park preserves the historic Sandstone Ranch, which was entered into the National Register of Historic Places as a historic district in 1976.

== Early ranch history ==
In the mid-1830s, a campsite was established along the wash that runs through the ranch. The spring-fed creek and grassy meadows formed an oasis for travelers using the alternate route of the Spanish Trail through Cottonwood Valley. The use of the site by pack and wagon trains continued until their replacement by the railroad in 1905. This remote trail was also used extensively by outlaws involved in Indian slave trading, horse stealing and raids upon passing caravans. In 1840, a group of American mountain men and Ute Indians conducted a famous raid on the Mexican Ranchos in California. Mountain Man Bill Williams, a member of the raiding party, brought his band of horses through Red Rock Canyon where he rested the horses from the hard trip across the desert. Apparently he revisited the area several times and although Williams never lived on the property, the site became known as the "Old Williams Ranch" or "Bill Williams Ranch."

== Sandstone Ranch ==
Sand Stone Ranch, as it was first known, was formed in 1876 by Sergeant James B. Wilson and George Anderson. The ranch under this name was listed on the United States National Register of Historic Places on April 2, 1976.

== Natural resources ==
"Because of the higher elevation, the ranch offers a diverse opportunity for plant study. Four plant communities are represented: Desert Scrub, Black brush, Pinon-Juniper, and Riparian. Plants typical of the desert as well as woodland can be seen, and with adequate rainfall the spring brings a burst of wildflowers. Common species sighted are desert marigold, globe mallow, brittlebush, Joshua Tree, Mojave yucca, and indigo bush. Animal life is diverse but nocturnal, so many species go unseen. Typical desert animals include a variety of lizards and snakes, antelope, ground squirrels, jackrabbits, cottontail rabbits, kit foxes, and coyotes. Higher elevation species include rock squirrel, badger, mule deer, and bighorn sheep."

== Activities and amenities ==
Historical sites at the park include the main ranch house, cabin and bunkhouse, blacksmith's shop, barn and corral, two-hole outhouse, chinchilla shed, and Wilson family cemetery. Park trails include the Ash Grove Trail and Overlook Interpretive Trails. It also has a picnic area and a summer theater program presented through a local non-profit theater organization.
