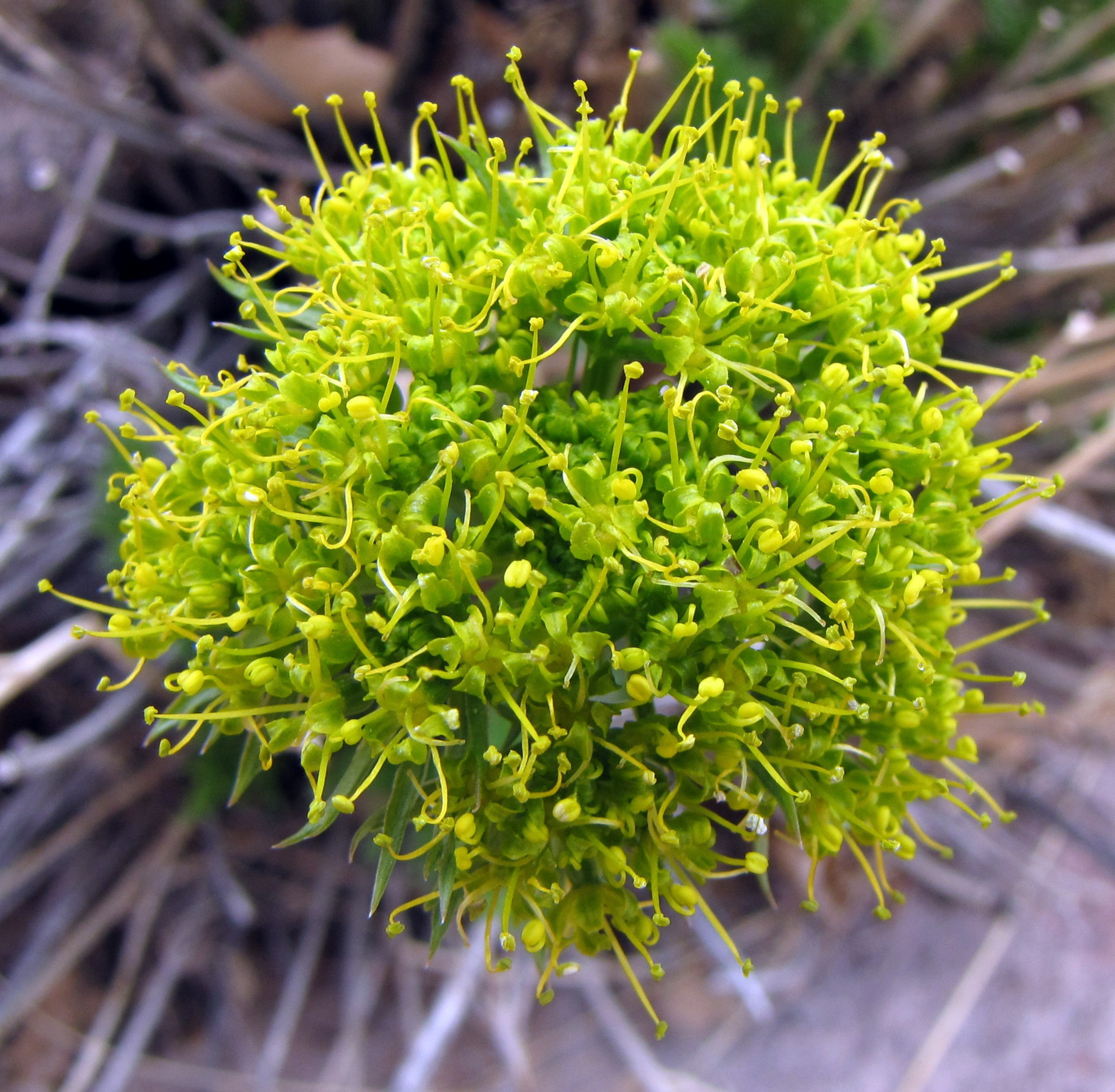
- Flower cluster

Conservation status
- Apparently Secure (NatureServe)

Scientific classification
- Kingdom: Plantae
- Clade: Embryophytes
- Clade: Tracheophytes
- Clade: Angiosperms
- Clade: Eudicots
- Clade: Asterids
- Order: Apiales
- Family: Apiaceae
- Genus: Lomatium
- Species: L. parryi

Binomial name
- Lomatium parryi (S.Wats.) J.F.Macbr.

= Lomatium parryi =

Species of plant

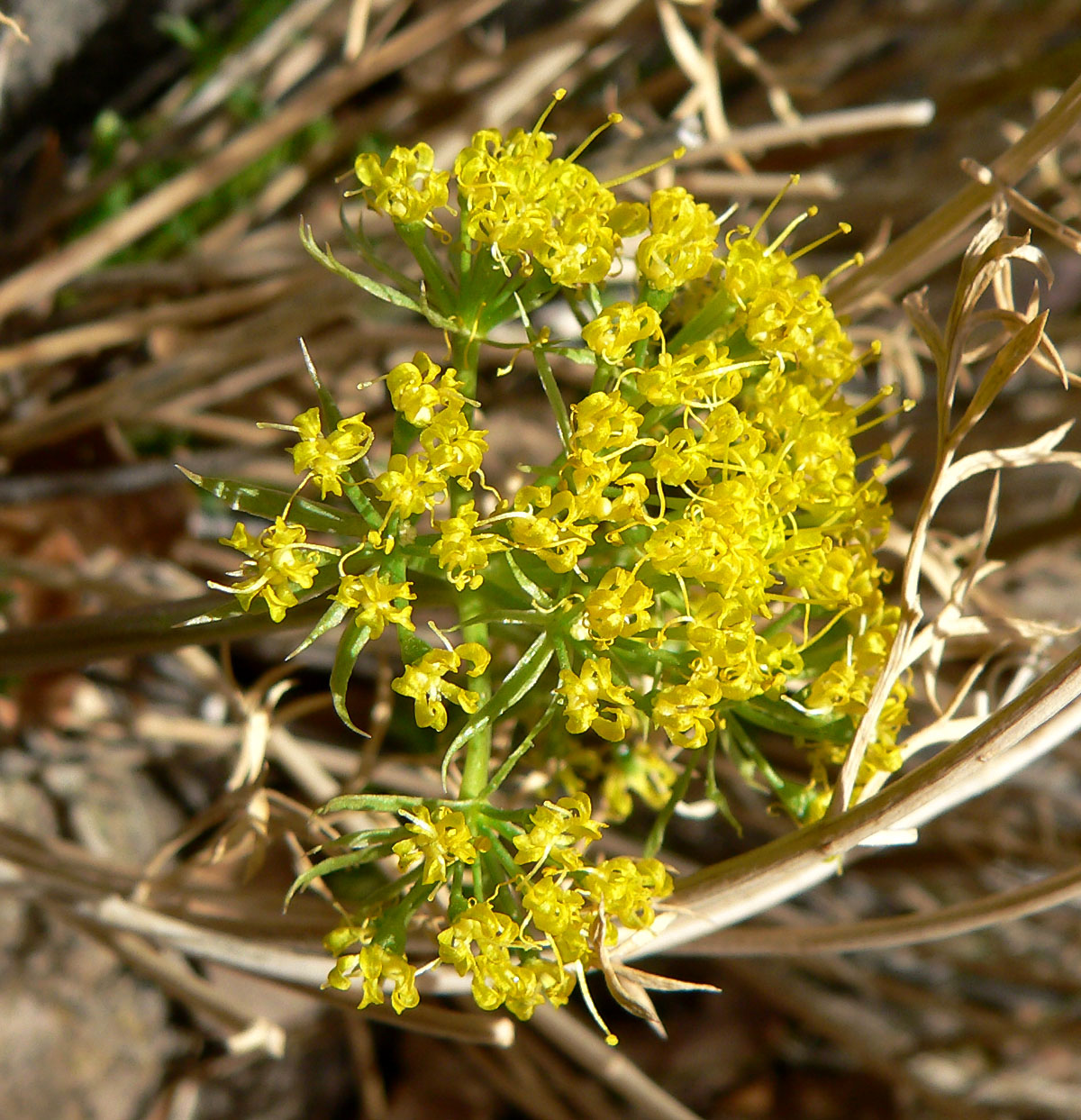
Lomatium parryi at Willow Spring, Red Rock Canyon, southern Nevada

Lomatium parryi, commonly known as Parry's biscuitroot and Utah desertparsley, is a perennial herb in the carrot family. It is a common herb in high altitude areas of deserts and common in desert national parks, such as the mountains surrounding Death Valley, in the western part of the United States.

The species epithet parryi honors Charles Christopher Parry (1823–1890), the first official botanist for the U.S. Department of Agriculture who also served during the Union Pacific Eastern Division's 1867 survey of the American Southwest. During his survey expeditions, he gathered various species previously unknown to the scientific community.

== Description ==
Lomatium parryi is a plant that grows from a taproot low to the ground, featuring small leaflets. The flowering stems are usually stout and with hollow internodes. The plant grows 20 to 40 centimeters tall. The hairy, basal leaves are divided into many small segments. The yellow flowers, which are visible in late winter and early spring and are easily overlooked due to their tiny size, are borne in an umbrella-like pattern known as an "umbel."

The flowers exhibit 8 to 15 ray florets and five prominent stamens, all of them measuring just a few millimeters. Below each cluster of flowers at the end of the pedicels, you may find 3 to 8 bractlets, which can be either whole or divided. Like most other plants, the flowers are pollinated by insects, which cause winged seeds to appear.

The fruits are schizocarp, which are flat and wide with lateral wings. They split into two halves, each one seeded. Lomatium parryi often retains its previous year's dead leaves and flower stalks, underscoring its resilience and ability to adapt over time.

== Uses ==
Lomatium parryi is a plant related to celery and carrots within the Apaceae family whose roots were harvested and consumed by early Native Americans.

Lomatium parryi serves as a larval host plant for certain Papilio indra subspecies in their natural habitats and can be a food source in laboratory settings for rearing P. indra subspecies.
