= Macks Peak =

Mountain in Nevada, United States

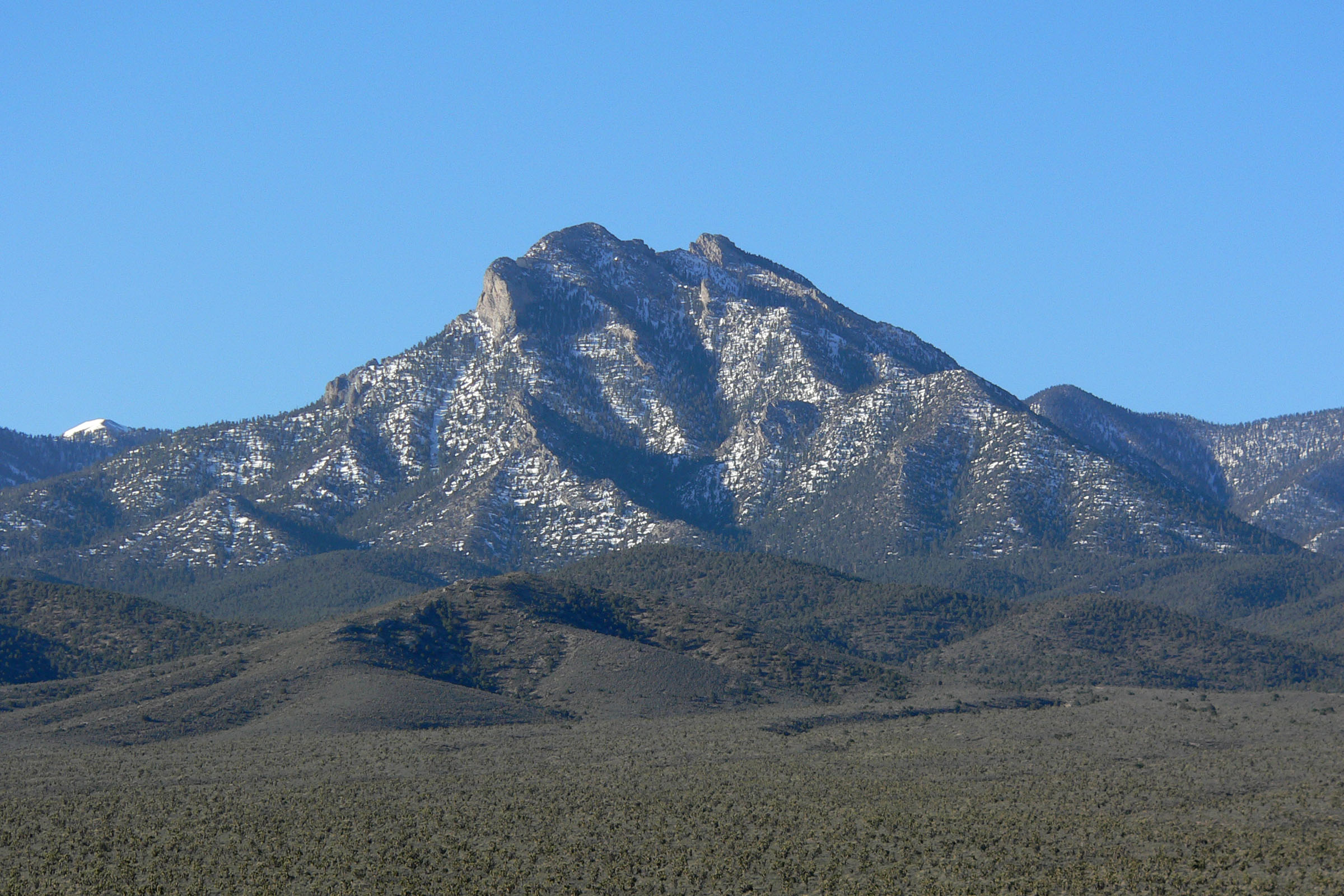
- North aspect

Highest point
- Elevation: 10,036 ft (3,059 m)
- Prominence: 1,129 ft (344 m)
- Parent peak: The Sisters
- Isolation: 1.41 mi (2.27 km)
- Coordinates: 36°21′02″N 115°41′50″W

Geography
- Location within Nevada Location within the United States
- Country: United States of America
- State: Nevada
- County: Clark
- Protected area: Mount Charleston Wilderness
- Parent range: Spring Mountains; Great Basin Ranges
- Topo map: USGS Charleston Peak

Geology
- Rock type: Limestone

Climbing
- Easiest route: class 3 scrambling

Macks Peak is a 10,036-foot elevation (3,059 m) summit located in Clark County, Nevada, United States.

== Description ==
Macks Peak is part of the Spring Mountains which are a subrange of the Great Basin Ranges. The peak is located 30 miles (48 km) northwest of Las Vegas in the Mount Charleston Wilderness, on land managed by the Humboldt–Toiyabe National Forest. Topographic relief is significant as the summit rises nearly 1,900 feet (580 meters) above Macks Canyon in one mile (1.6 km). This mountain's toponym has not been officially adopted by the U.S. Board on Geographic Names, however Macks Canyon has been.

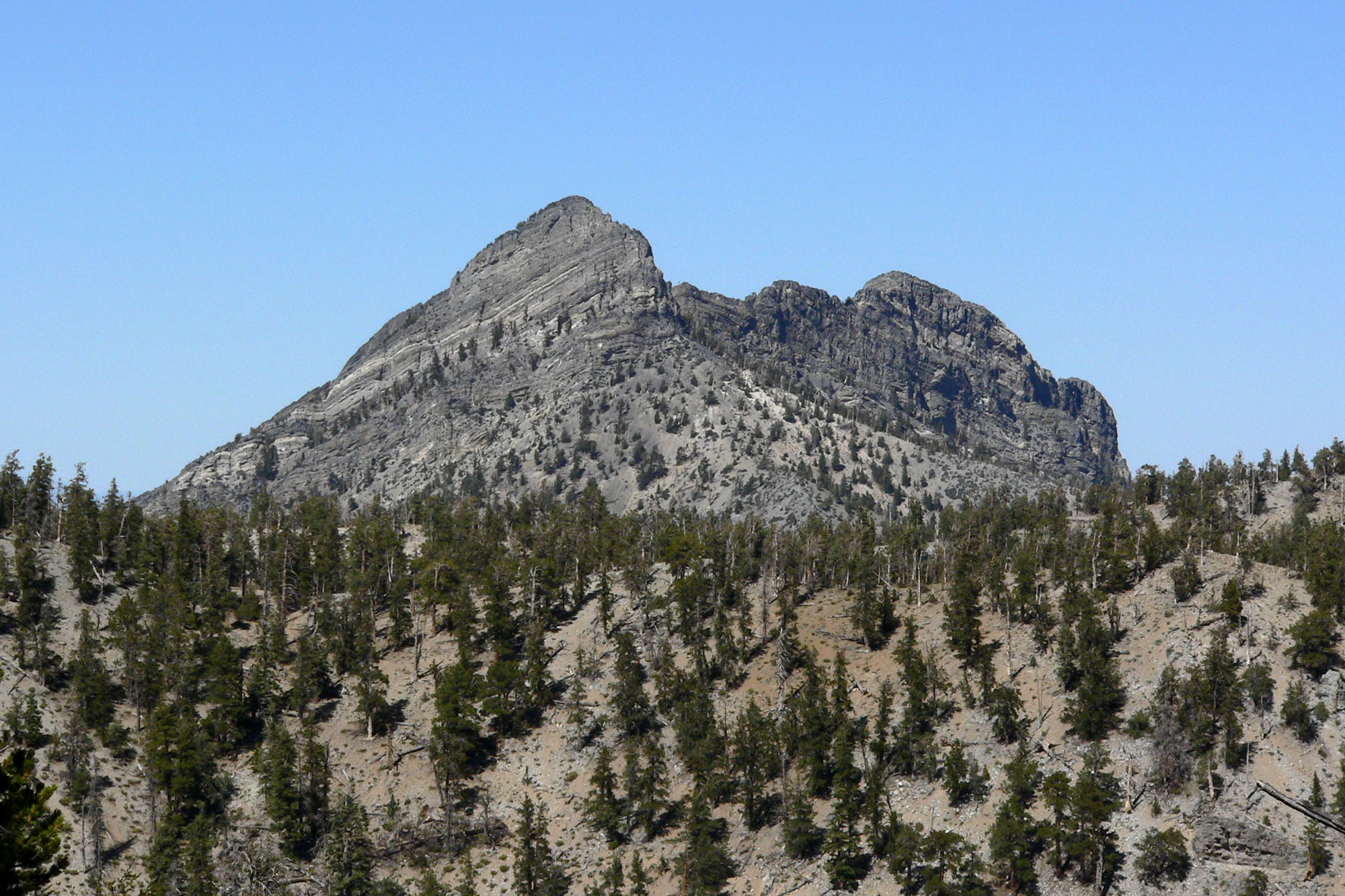
Macks Peak, south aspect

== Climate ==
Macks Peak is set within the Great Basin Desert which has hot summers and cold winters. The desert is an example of a cold desert climate as the desert's elevation makes temperatures cooler than lower elevation deserts. Due to the high elevation and aridity, temperatures drop sharply after sunset. Summer nights are comfortably cool. Winter highs are generally above freezing, and winter nights are bitterly cold, with temperatures often dropping well below freezing.

== Climbing ==
An ascent of the peak involves hiking and scrambling six miles (9.7 km) (round-trip) with 1,177 feet (359 m) of elevation gain. Access is via the Macks Canyon Road from Highway 156.

== See also ==
- List of mountain peaks of Nevada
- Great Basin
