= The Sisters (Nevada) =

Mountain in Nevada, United States

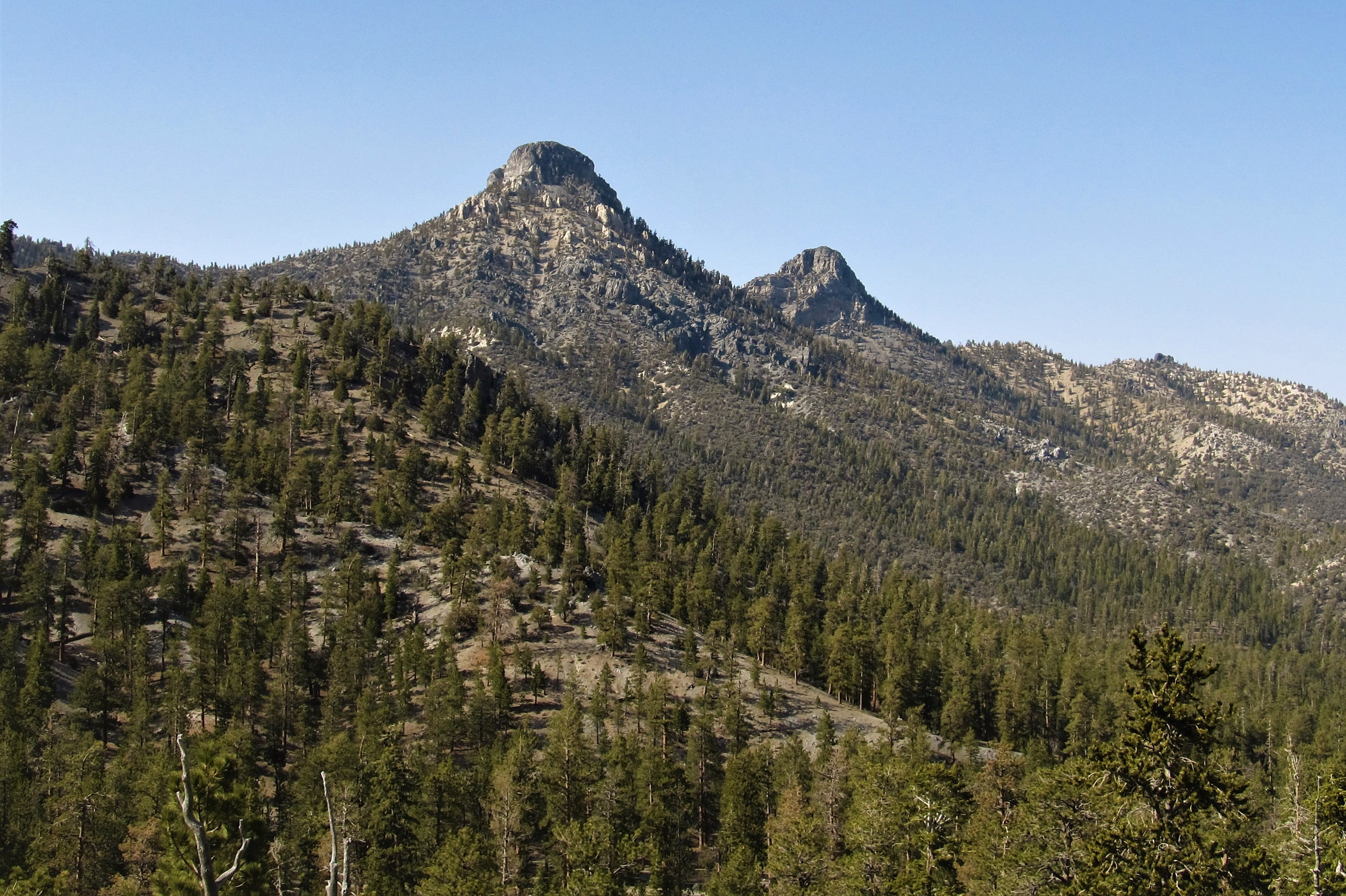
- South aspect

Highest point
- Elevation: 10,178 ft (3,102 m)
- Prominence: 828 ft (252 m)
- Parent peak: McFarland Peak
- Isolation: 2.25 mi (3.62 km)
- Coordinates: 36°19′47″N 115°40′59″W

Geography
- Location within Nevada Location within the United States
- Country: United States of America
- State: Nevada
- County: Clark
- Protected area: Mount Charleston Wilderness
- Parent range: Spring Mountains; Great Basin Ranges
- Topo map: USGS Charleston Peak

Climbing
- Easiest route: class 2

The Sisters is a 10,178-foot elevation (3,102 m) summit located in Clark County, Nevada, United States.

== Description ==
The Sisters is part of the Spring Mountains which are a subrange of the Great Basin Ranges. The mountain is located 30 miles (48 km) northwest of Las Vegas in the Spring Mountains National Recreation Area and on the boundary of the Mount Charleston Wilderness, on land managed by the Humboldt–Toiyabe National Forest. Topographic relief is significant as the summit rises 2,000 feet (610 meters) above Lee Canyon in one mile (1.6 km). This mountain's toponym has been officially adopted by the U.S. Board on Geographic Names.

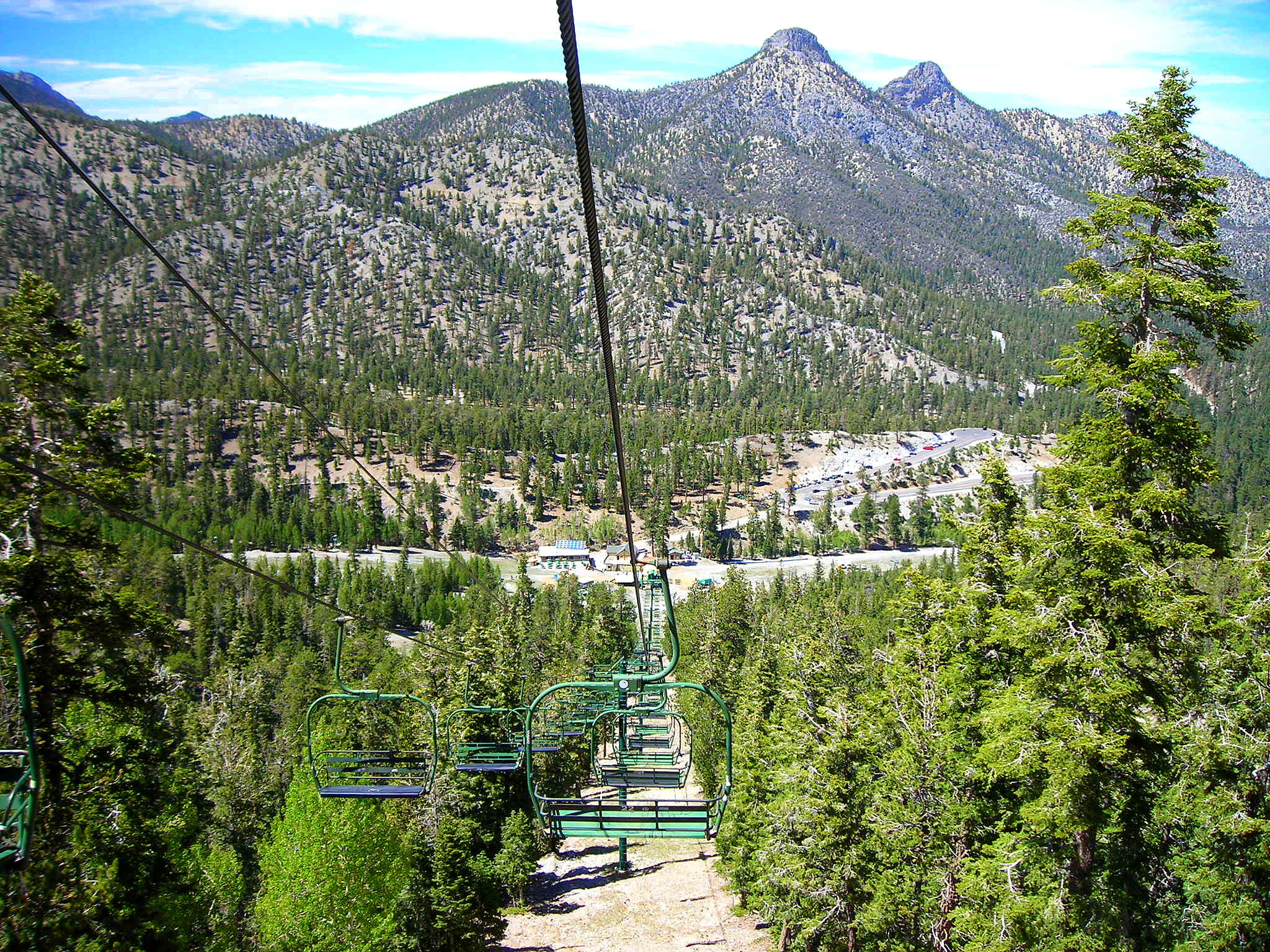
The Sisters viewed from Lee Canyon ski lift

== Climate ==
The Sisters is set within the Great Basin Desert which has hot summers and cold winters. The desert is an example of a cold desert climate as the desert's elevation makes temperatures cooler than lower elevation deserts. Due to the high elevation and aridity, temperatures drop sharply after sunset. Summer nights are comfortably cool. Winter highs are generally above freezing, and winter nights are bitterly cold, with temperatures often dropping well below freezing.

== Climbing ==
An ascent of the peak involves hiking and scrambling six miles (9.7 km) (round-trip) with 1,482 feet (452 m) of elevation gain. Access is via the Macks Canyon Road from Highway 156.

== See also ==
- List of mountain peaks of Nevada
- Great Basin
