= Bridge Mountain (Nevada) =

Mountain in Nevada, United States

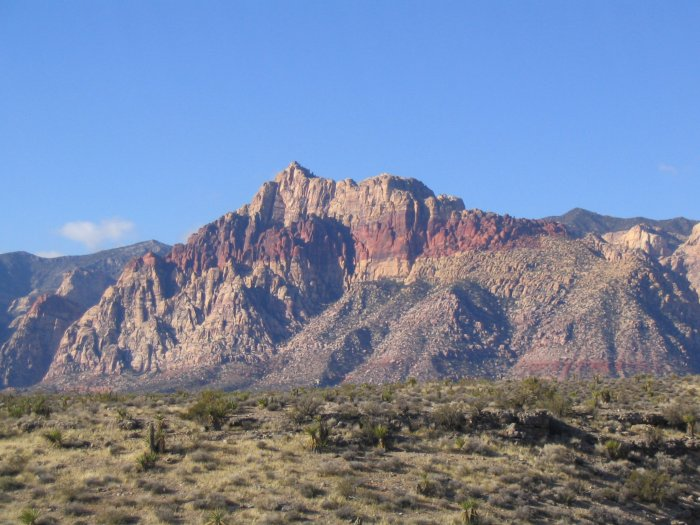
- Bridge Mountain from the Red Rock Canyon Overlook

Highest point
- Elevation: 6958+ ft (2121+ m)
- Prominence: 1,991 ft (607 m)
- Listing: Desert Peak Section List
- Coordinates: 36°08′08″N 115°29′26″W

Geography
- Location: Clark County, Nevada, U.S.
- Parent range: Spring Mountains
- Topo map: USGS La Madre Mountain

Climbing
- Easiest route: Scramble, class 3

Bridge Mountain is a mountain located in the Spring Mountain range of southern Nevada. It is located on land managed by the United States Bureau of Land Management as the Red Rock Canyon National Conservation Area, part of the Rainbow Mountain Wilderness. Bridge Mountain is named for the natural feature of a bridge-like natural arch of sandstone near the summit.

== Hiking Route ==
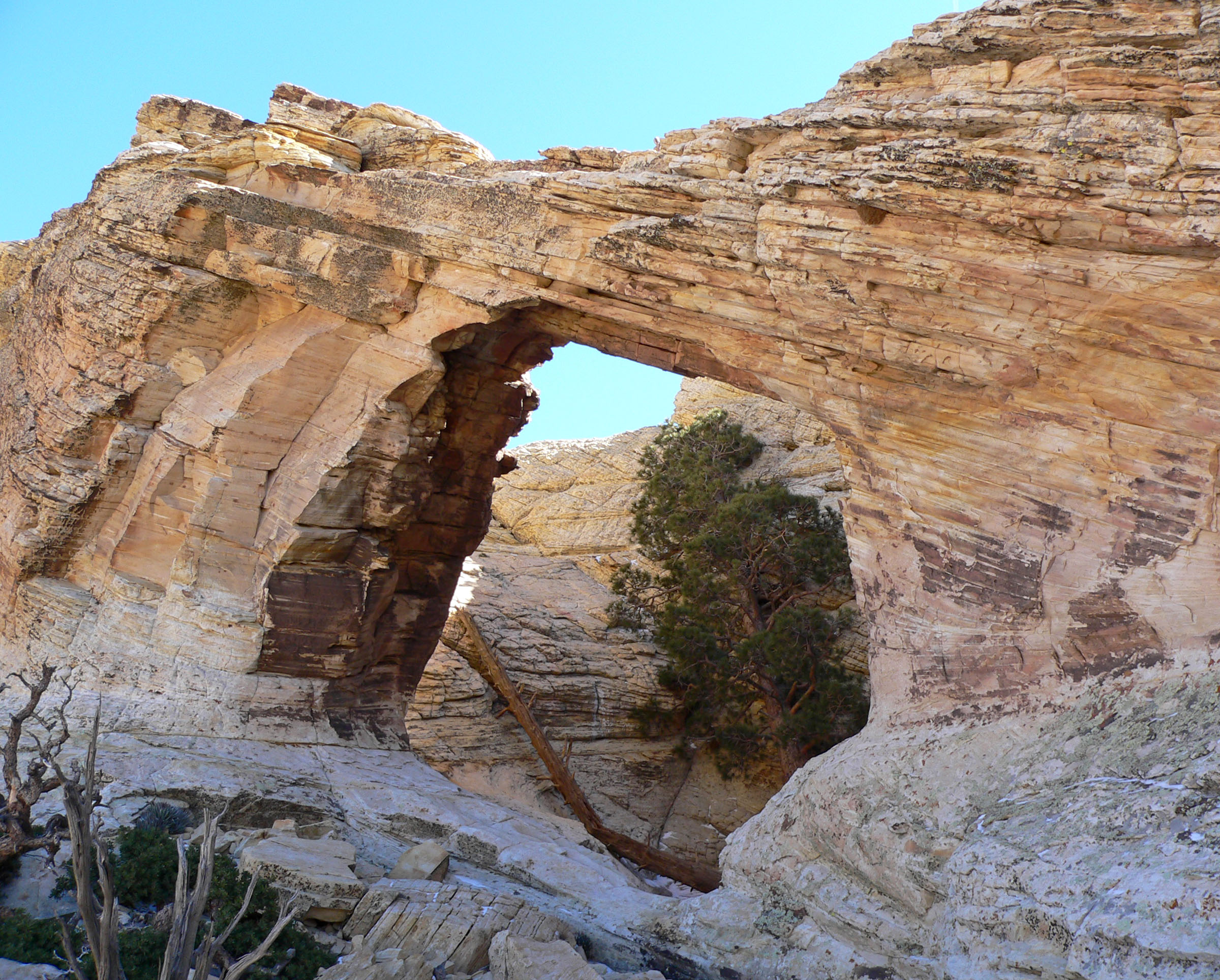
The bridge on Bridge Mountain

The Bridge Mountain hike begins at the Rocky Gap Summit Trailhead, accessible by 4WD drive only. Hikers can park at the north Willow Springs campground and walk 5 miles (8 km) to the summit. Alternatively, hikers can turn North from Highway 160 and drive 7.5 miles (12 km) North on the Lovell Canyon Road and park where the pavement ends. The hike from here to the summit is about 3.3 miles (5.3 km) and has less elevation gain.

The hike climbs over the crest of the shale formed, north-south oriented Spring Mountain Ranges, and rewards the hiker with panoramic views of the Red Rock Escarpment below. A marked trail along the crest descends to the sandstone escarpment. Here, steep free climbing down a chimney—possible without technical gear—takes the hiker to a narrow neck of rock that separates the drainages of Pine Creek to the south and Icebox Canyon to the north. The hike is marked by cairns that show the route to proceed up toward the base of a cliff, angling left just above the northern drop-off. The hike ascends the slickrock here, in a crack in the rock. After about 150 feet (50 m), the route comes to a point where there is a broad, flat ledge on the left, then continues about several feet to the left where a wider gully climbs to the top of the cliff. This leads up to the natural bridge for which the mountain is named. The bridge itself is the remains of a tinaja, or water tank, that eroded and left a remnant of the side, now a bridge.

In order to get to the top, one must climb over a fallen tree, bringing the person within reach of several pools, access to the bridge, and near the Hidden Forest (see below). Heading south for several hundred feet, one then must climb along a steep, difficult ridge to get near the top. At the top, a small ammunition box contains the peak's sign-in book.

In a cleft in the sandstone of Bridge Mountain's summit, there is a small hidden forest of Ponderosa pine. Expansive views of the Las Vegas Valley can be seen from the Eastern end of the hidden forest.

== Gallery ==
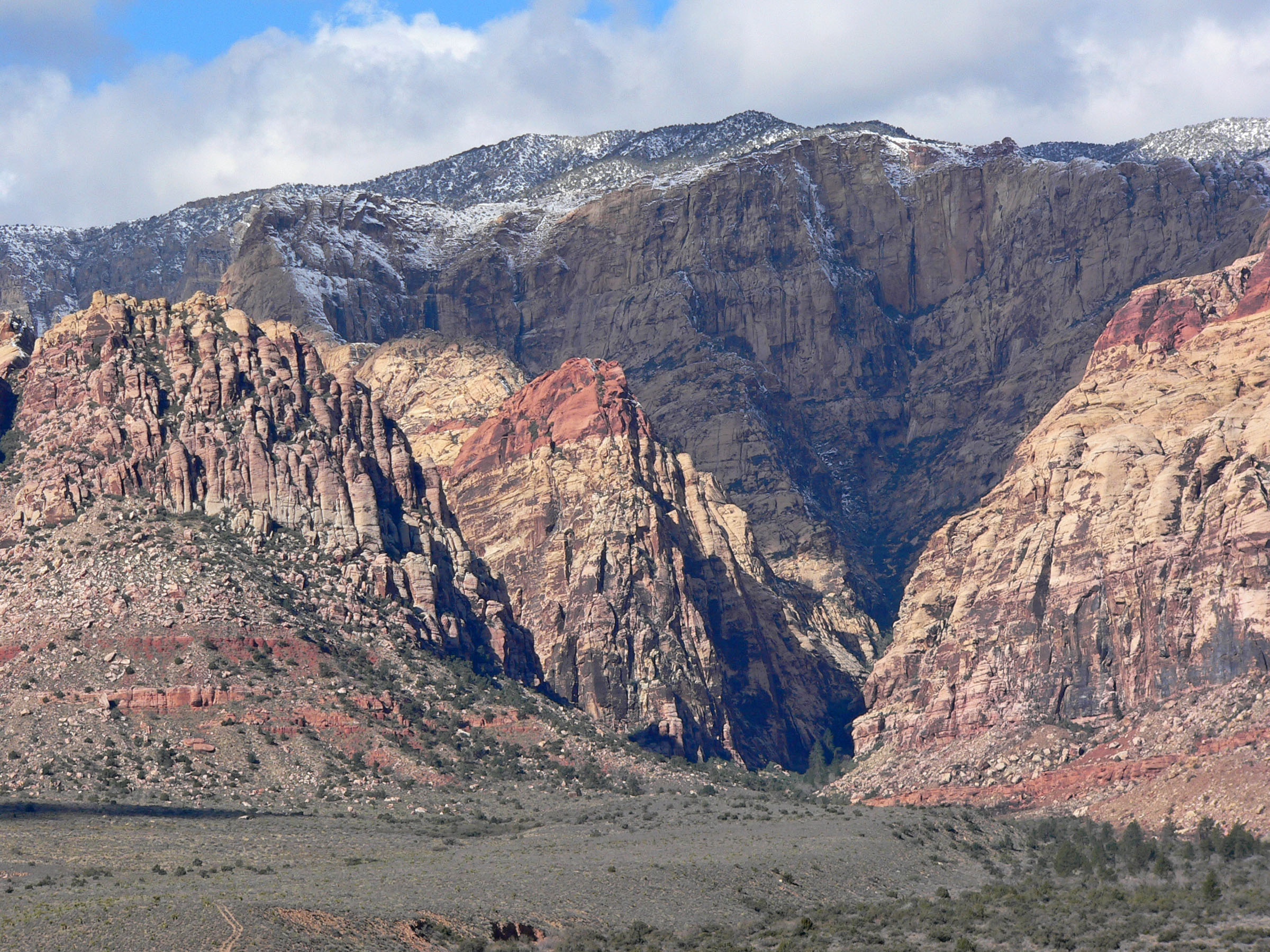
Pine Creek Canyon with the south side of the Bridge Mountain on the left

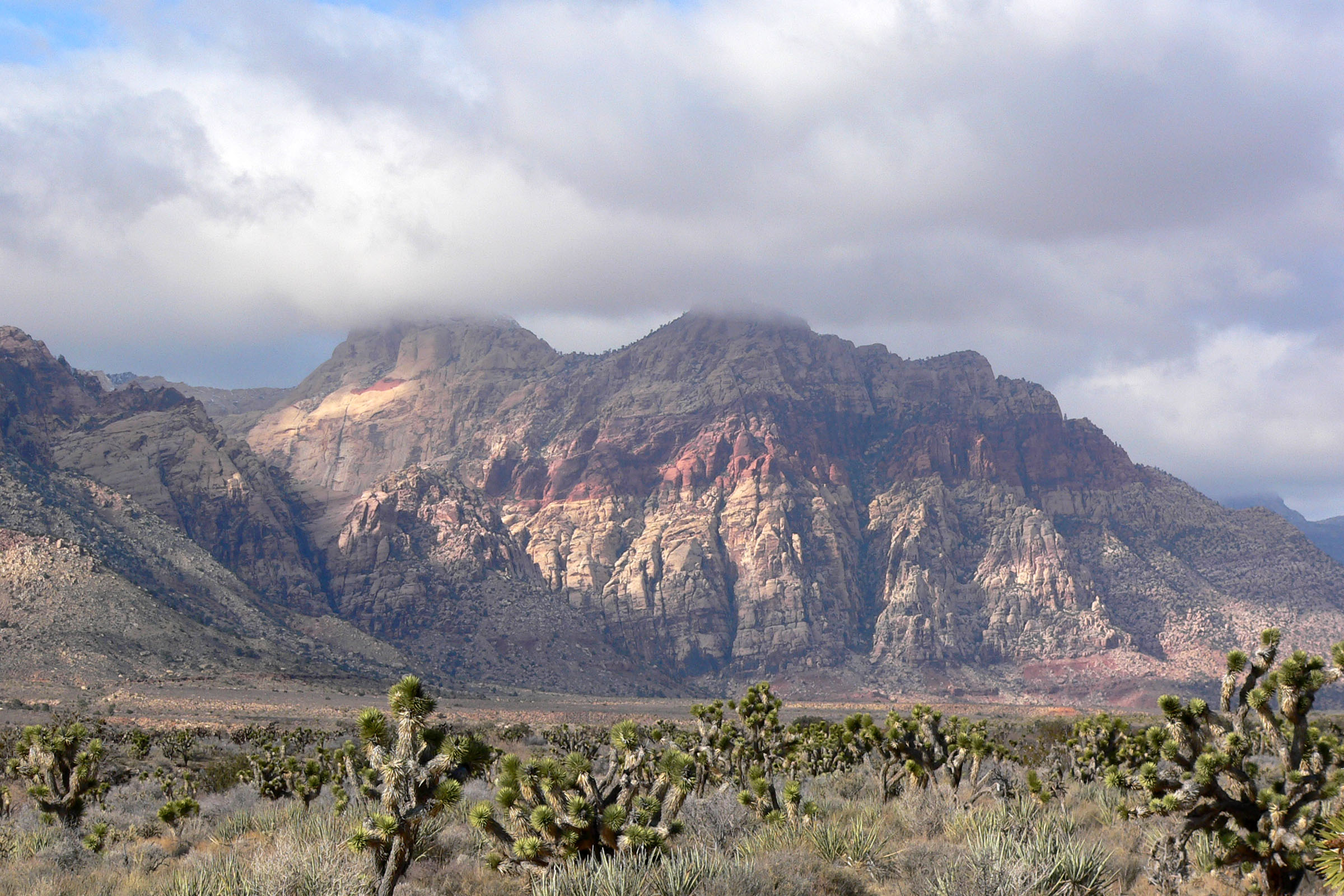
View from South East with entrance to Pine Creek Canyon on the left

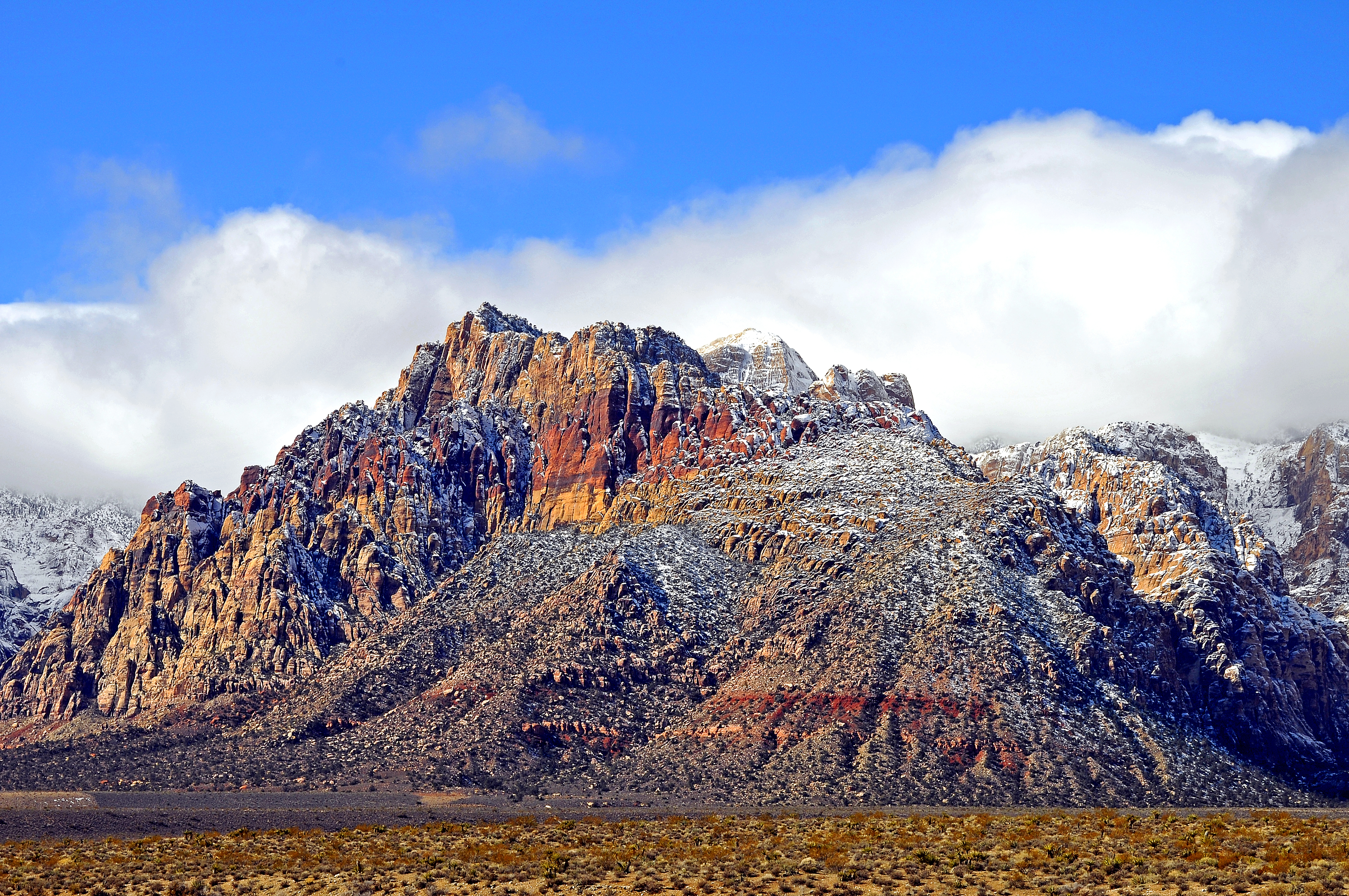
View from East

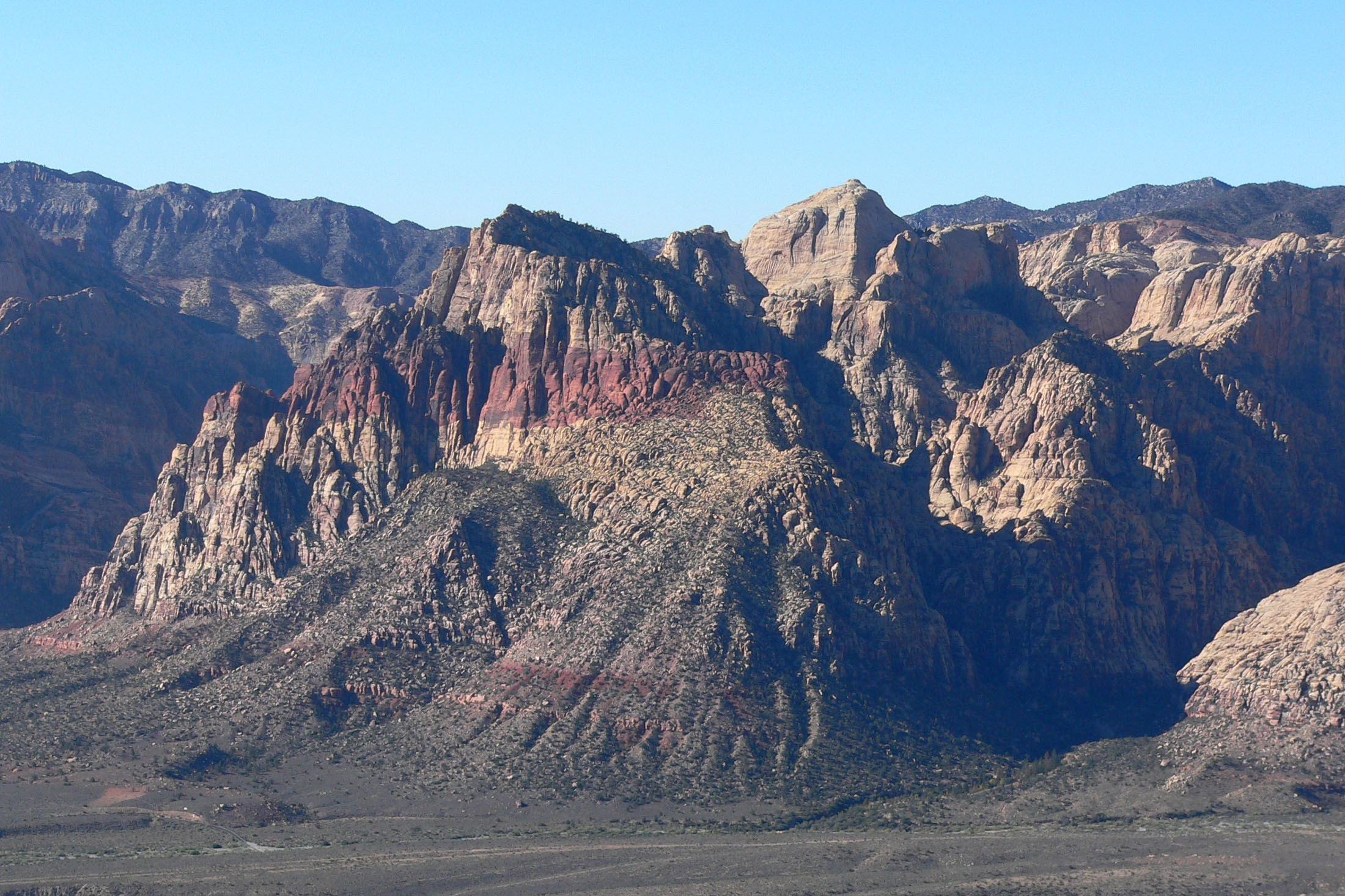
View from North East with entrance to Icebox Canyon on the right

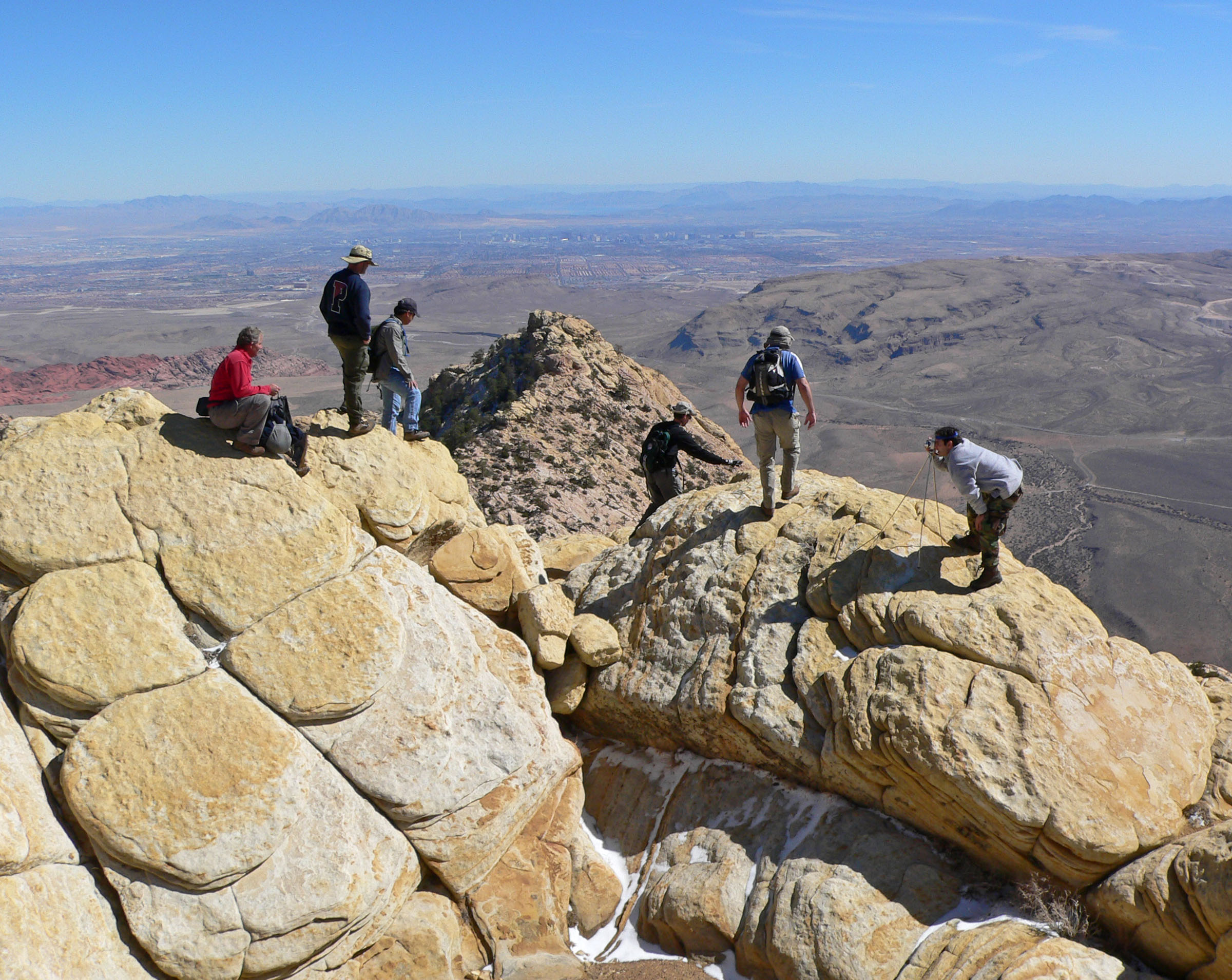
Summit

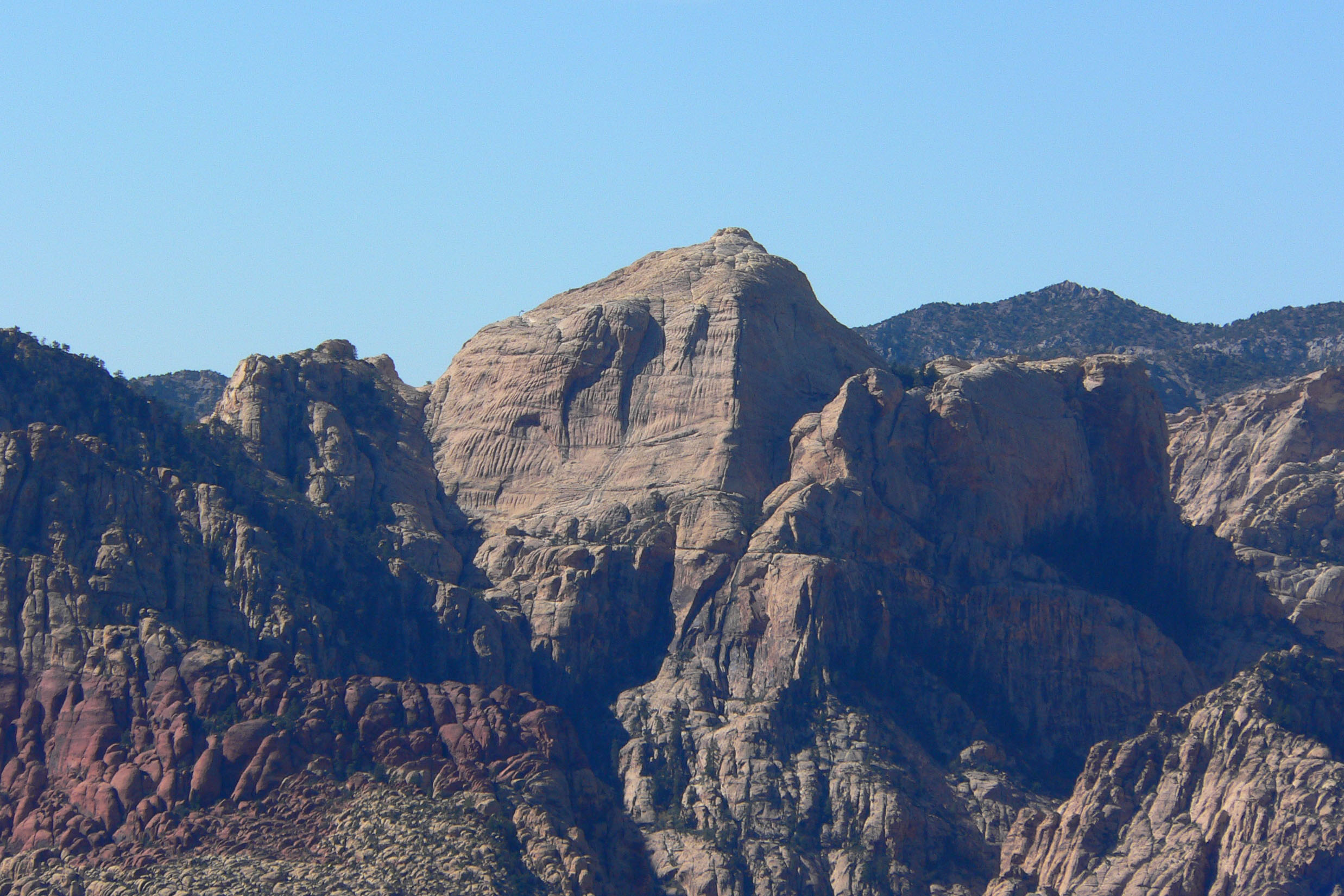
Summit from Turtlehead Mountain to the North East

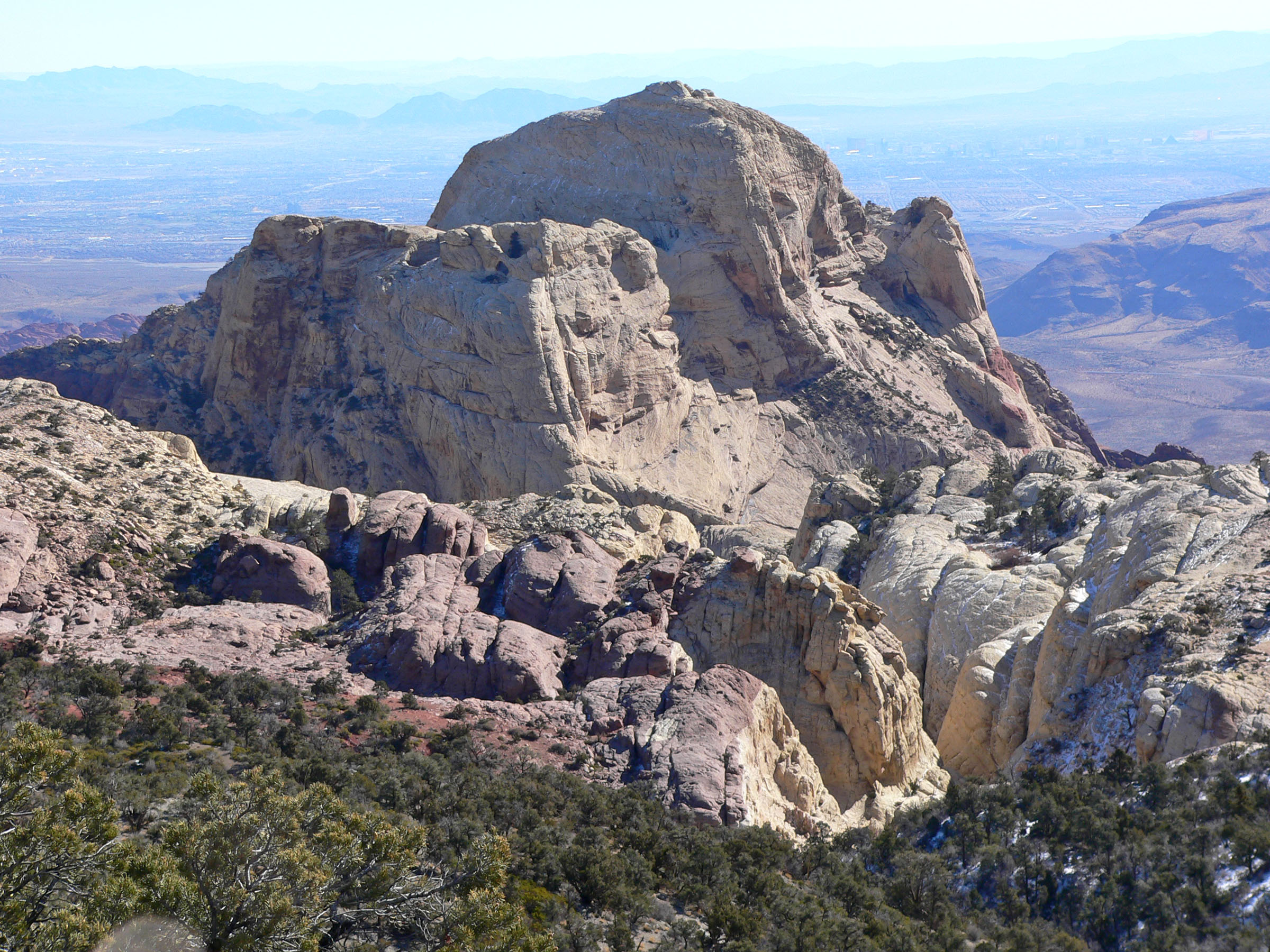
Summit from the West
