= Griffith Peak =

Mountain in Nevada, United States

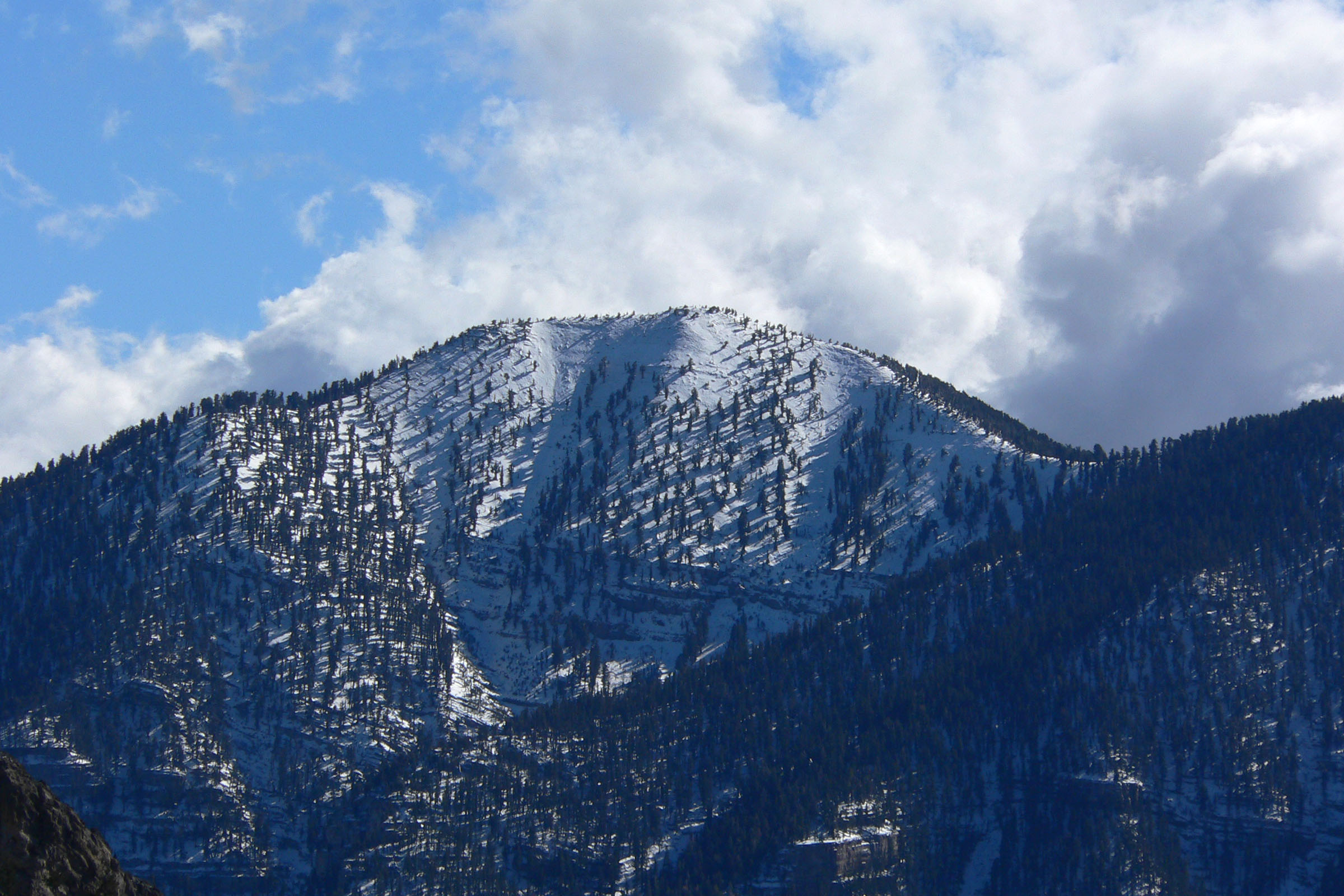
- View of Griffith Peak from the top of Trail Canyon

Highest point
- Elevation: 11,064 ft (3,372 m) NAVD 88
- Prominence: 430 ft (131 m)
- Coordinates: 36°13′57″N 115°38′46″W

Geography
- Location within Nevada
- Location: Clark County, Nevada, U.S.
- Parent range: Spring Mountains
- Topo map: USGS Griffith Peak

Climbing
- Easiest route: Trail hike

Griffith Peak is located in the Spring Mountains in Clark County of southern Nevada. It is approximately 28 miles (45 km) northwest of the Las Vegas Strip and 3.9 miles (6.3 km) southeast of Mount Charleston.

Griffith Peak is Nevada's 43rd highest peak, and the third highest peak in southern Nevada. It is within Humboldt–Toiyabe National Forest, Mount Charleston Wilderness and Spring Mountains National Recreation Area.

Griffith Peak is accessible by two primary trails: the South Loop Trail and the Harris Springs Trail. The South Loop Trail leads directly to the Griffith Saddle from which both Griffith Peak and Mount Charleston are accessible.

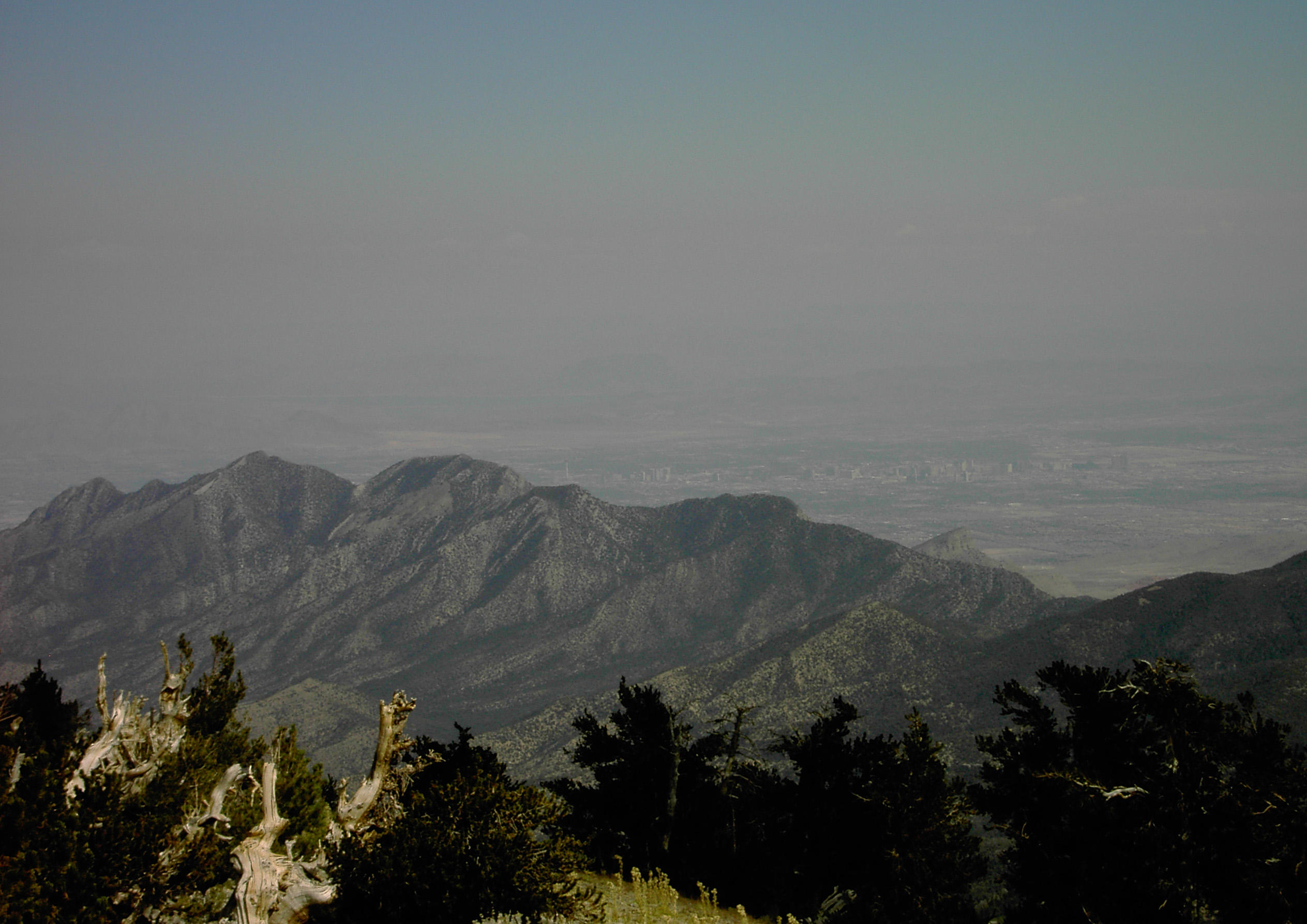
Griffith Peak looking toward Las Vegas
