= McFarland Peak =

Mountain in Nevada, United States

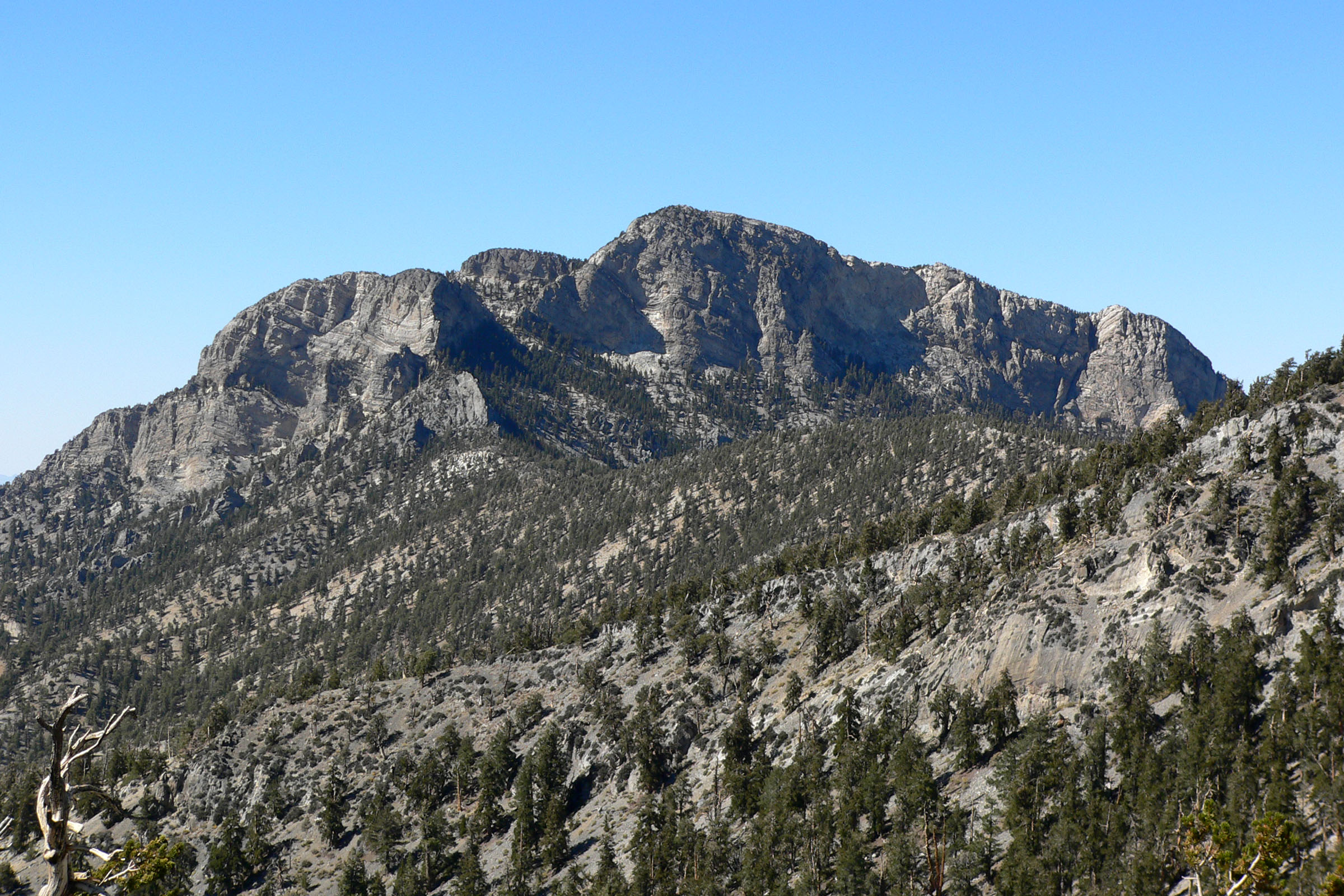

Highest point
- Elevation: 10,749 ft (3,276 m) NAVD 88
- Prominence: 1,165 ft (355 m)
- Coordinates: 36°20′29″N 115°43′32″W

Geography
- Location within Nevada
- Location: Clark County, Nevada, U.S.
- Parent range: Spring Mountains
- Topo map: USGS Charleston Peak

McFarland Peak is a limestone peak in the northern portion of the Spring Mountains in Clark County of southern Nevada. It is in the Toiyabe National Forest and the Mount Charleston Wilderness.

McFarland Peak is located north of Mount Charleston and southwest of Macks Peak.

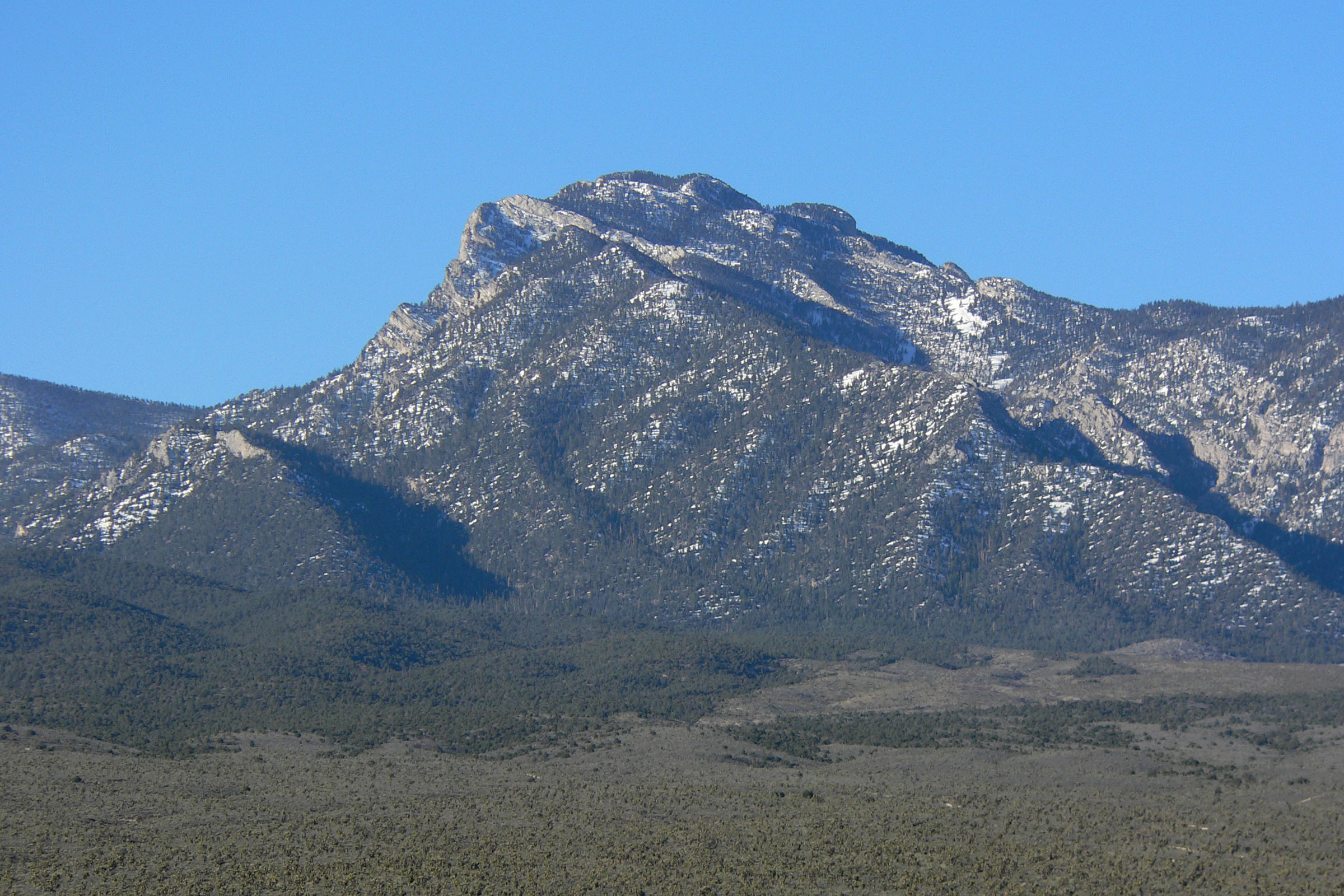
McFarland Peak seen from Indian Ridge
