= Mount Wilson (Clark County, Nevada) =

Mountain in Nevada, United States

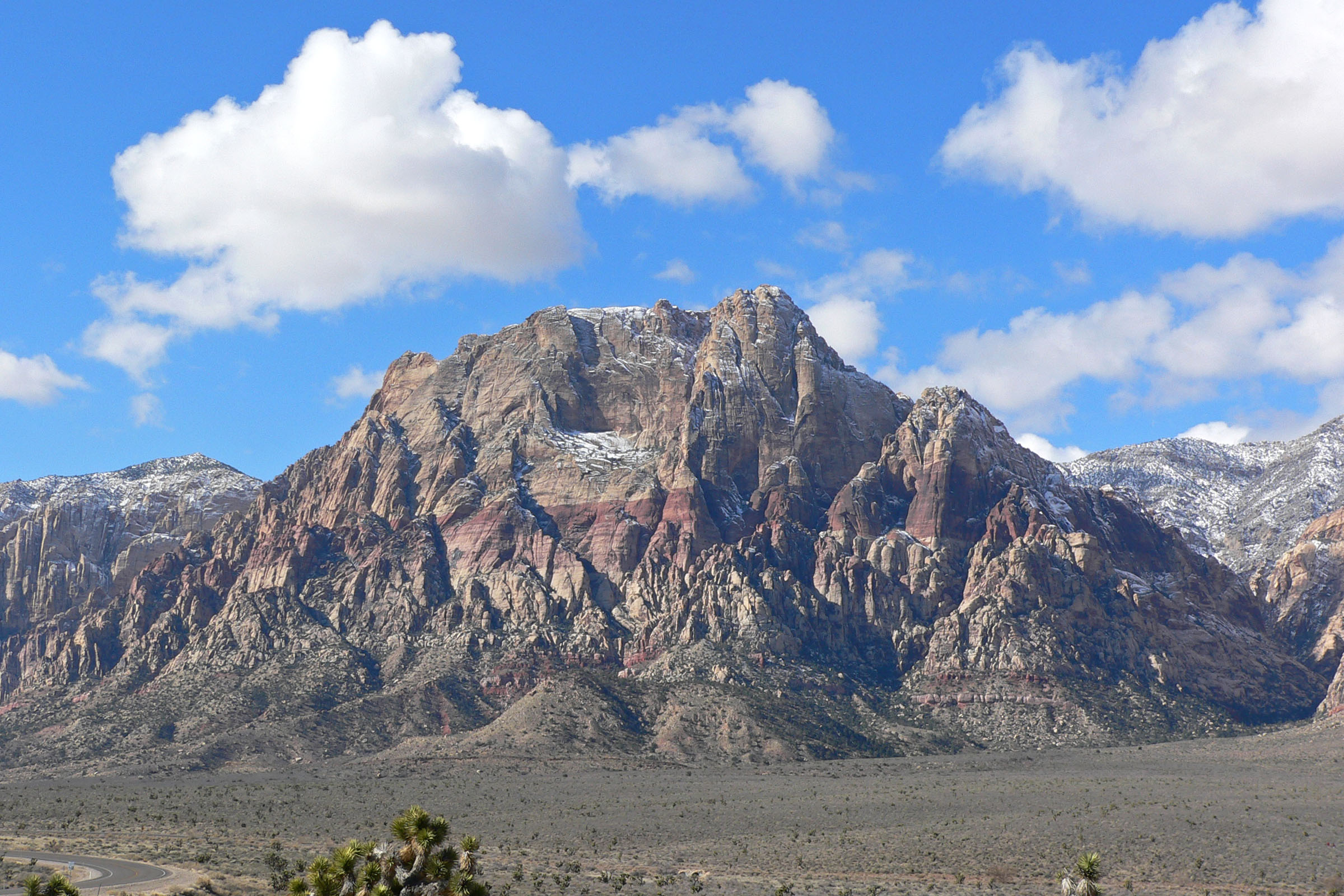

Highest point
- Elevation: 7,071 ft (2,155 m)
- Prominence: 670 ft (200 m)
- Coordinates: 36°05′37″N 115°29′02″W

Geography
- Location within Nevada
- Location: Clark County, Nevada, U.S.
- Parent range: Spring Mountains
- Topo map: USGS Blue Diamond

Climbing
- Easiest route: Scramble

Mount Wilson is a mountain located in the Spring Mountain range of southern Nevada. It is located on land managed by the United States Bureau of Land Management as the Red Rock Canyon National Conservation Area, part of the Rainbow Mountain Wilderness Area. It is the highest peak in the Red Rock Canyon National Conservation Area.

Mount Wilson is 17 miles (27 km) west of downtown Las Vegas in Clark County, Nevada.

== Hiking Route ==
Mount Wilson's sandstone cliffs are accessible to hikers starting at the First Creek trailhead and proceeding west into First Creek Canyon. From there, at least two distinct and strenuous third-class routes lead to the summit.
