= Turtlehead Mountain =

Mountain in Nevada, United States

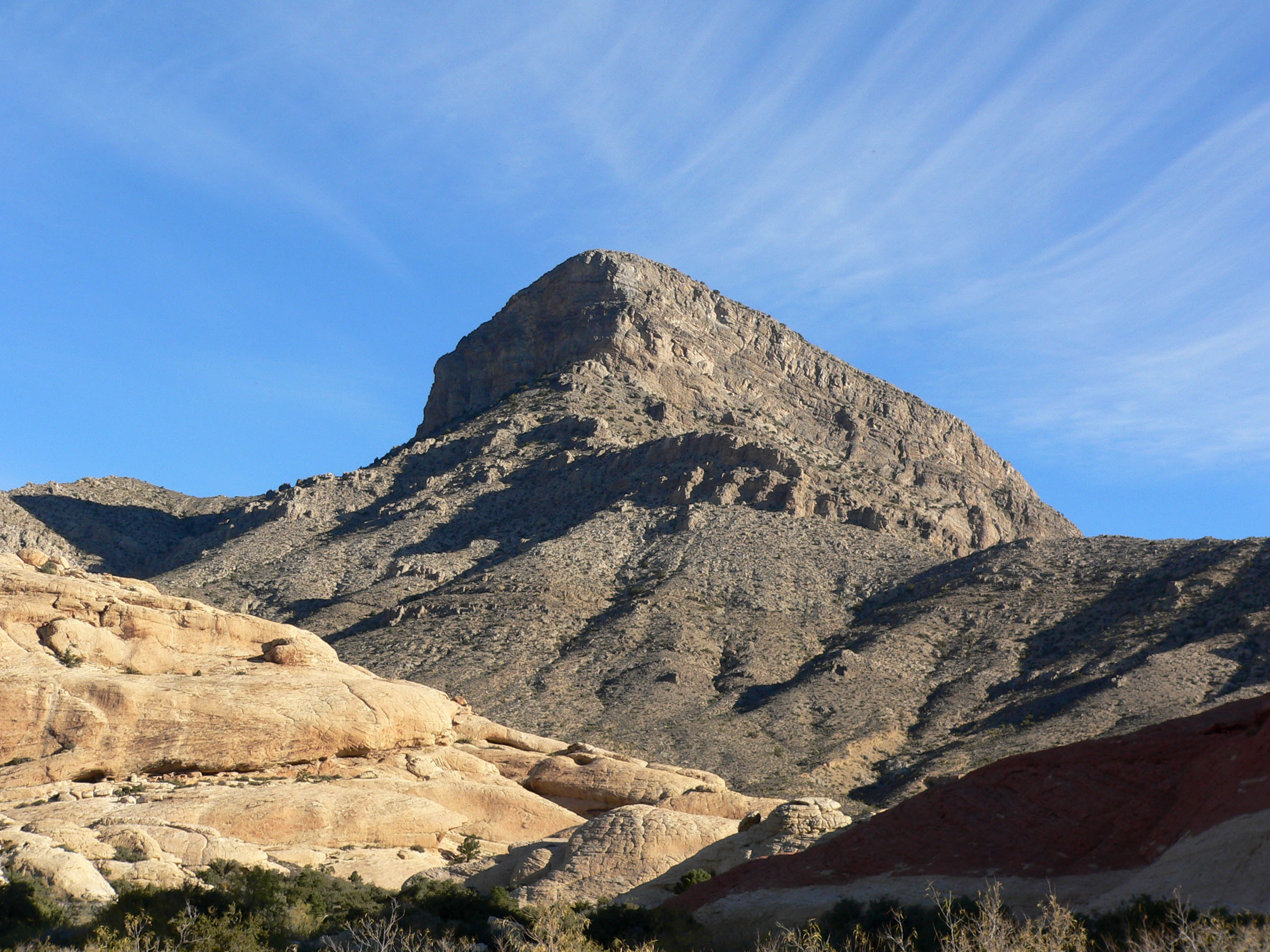
- South aspect

Highest point
- Elevation: 6,323 ft (1,927 m)
- Prominence: 623 ft (190 m)
- Isolation: 1.94 mi (3.12 km)
- Coordinates: 36°10′49″N 115°26′45″W

Geography
- Location within Nevada Location within the United States
- Country: United States
- State: Nevada
- County: Clark
- Protected area: La Madre Mountains Wilderness; Red Rock Canyon National Conservation Area
- Parent range: Spring Mountains; Great Basin Ranges
- Topo map: USGS La Madre Mountain

Geology
- Rock age: Paleozoic
- Rock type: Limestone

Climbing
- Easiest route: class 2 hiking

Turtlehead Mountain is a 6,323-foot-elevation (1,927-meter) summit in Clark County, Nevada, United States.

== Description ==
Turtlehead Mountain, also known as Turtlehead Peak, is located 17 miles (27 km) west of downtown Las Vegas in the Spring Mountains which are a subrange of the Great Basin Ranges. It is set on land administered by the Bureau of Land Management as the Red Rock Canyon National Conservation Area. Turtlehead Mountain is composed of limestone which formed about 250 million years ago during the Paleozoic. Precipitation runoff from the mountain's slopes drains into Red Rock Wash which is part of the Colorado River watershed. Topographic relief is significant as the summit rises over 1,500 feet (457 meters) above Brownstone Basin in one mile (1.6 km). Access to the summit is via the Turtlehead Peak Trail which covers five miles and gains 2,000 feet of elevation. This mountain's descriptive toponym has been officially adopted by the U.S. Board on Geographic Names.

== Climate ==
Turtlehead Mountain is set within the Mojave Desert which has hot summers and cold winters. The desert is an example of a cold desert climate as the desert's elevation makes temperatures cooler than lower elevation deserts. Due to the high elevation and aridity, temperatures drop sharply after sunset. Summer nights are comfortably cool. Winter highs are generally above freezing, and winter nights are bitterly cold, with temperatures often dropping below freezing.

== See also ==
- Great Basin

== Gallery ==
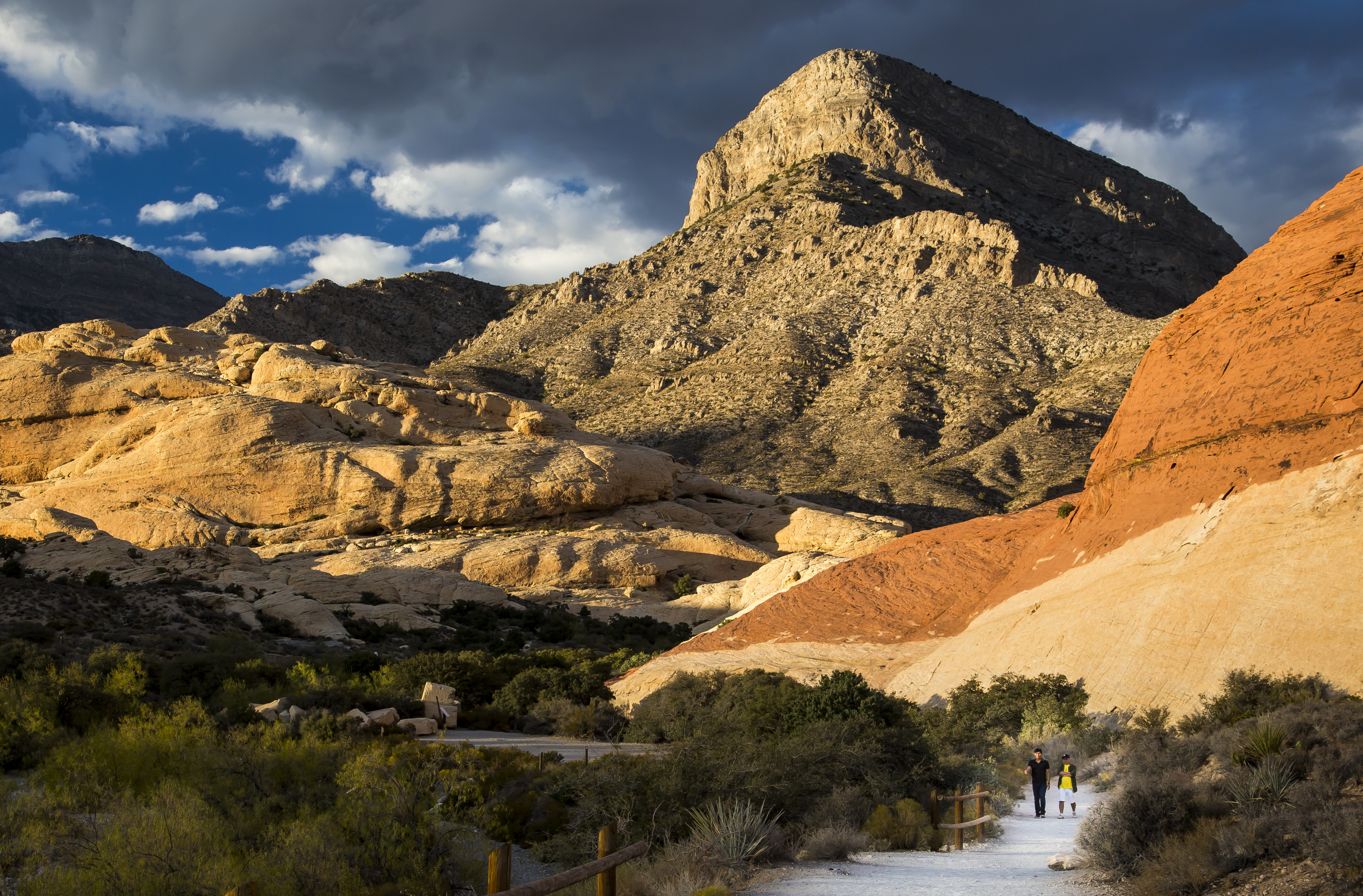

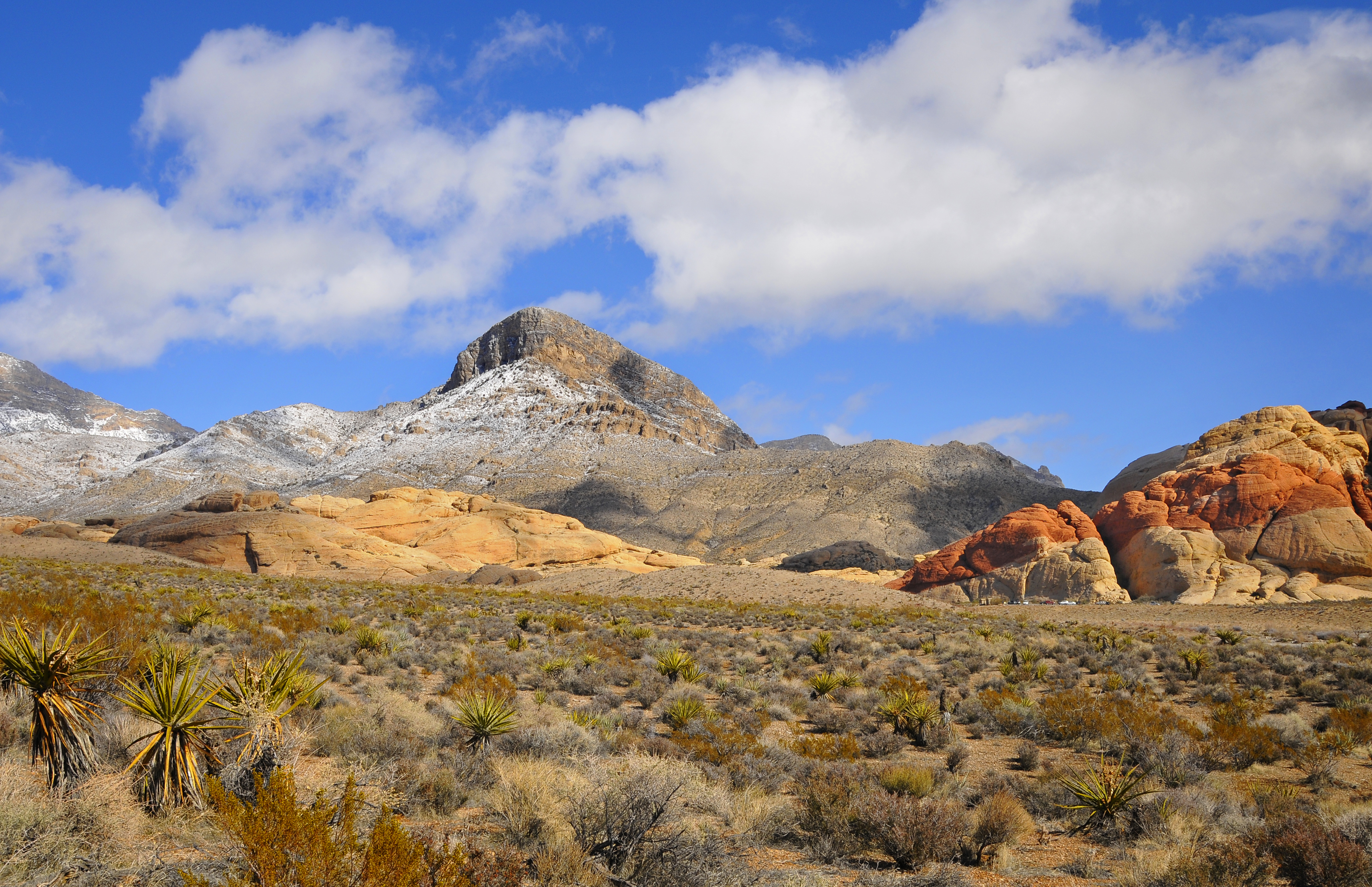

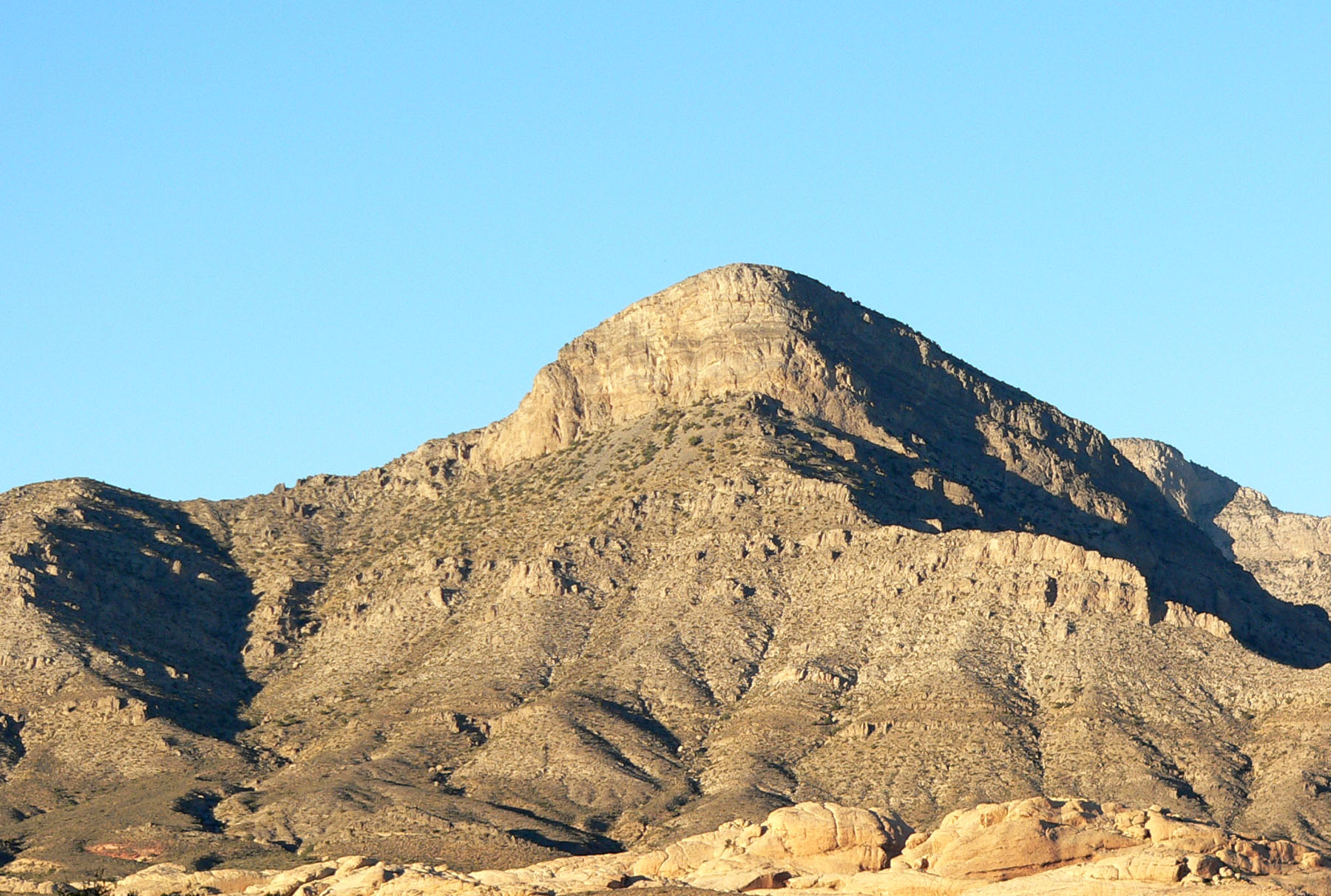
