= Indian Springs Pass =

- Location within Nevada

Highest point
- Coordinates: 36°34′23″N 115°40′31″W

Geography
- Location: Indian Springs, Clark County, Nevada, United States

Indian Springs Pass, is a mountain pass 40-mi (64 km) northwest of Las Vegas in northwest Clark County, Nevada.

The pass is in a region of converging landforms of various watersheds, valleys, and mountain ranges; specifically it lies on the north perimeter of the Ivanpah-Pahrump Watershed-(Pahrump Valley). The endorheic Indian Springs Valley watershed lies due north, and the endorheic Three Lakes Valley is adjacent east.

== Description of water divide regions ==
The following landforms converge at the Indian Springs Pass region:

1–(north)-Pahrump Valley-Spring Mountains, extends due south, (Pahrump Valley, of west watershed)
2–Spring Mountains-SE
3–Indian Springs Valley & Watershed, (endorheic)-N
4–south playas, south Three Lakes Valley (Nevada)-E & SE

The south playas of Three Lakes Valley, are on the northwest, up-basin perimeter of the Las Vegas Valley.

== See also ==
- List of Great Basin Divide border landforms of Nevada
