= Spring Mountains =

Mountain range in Nevada, United States

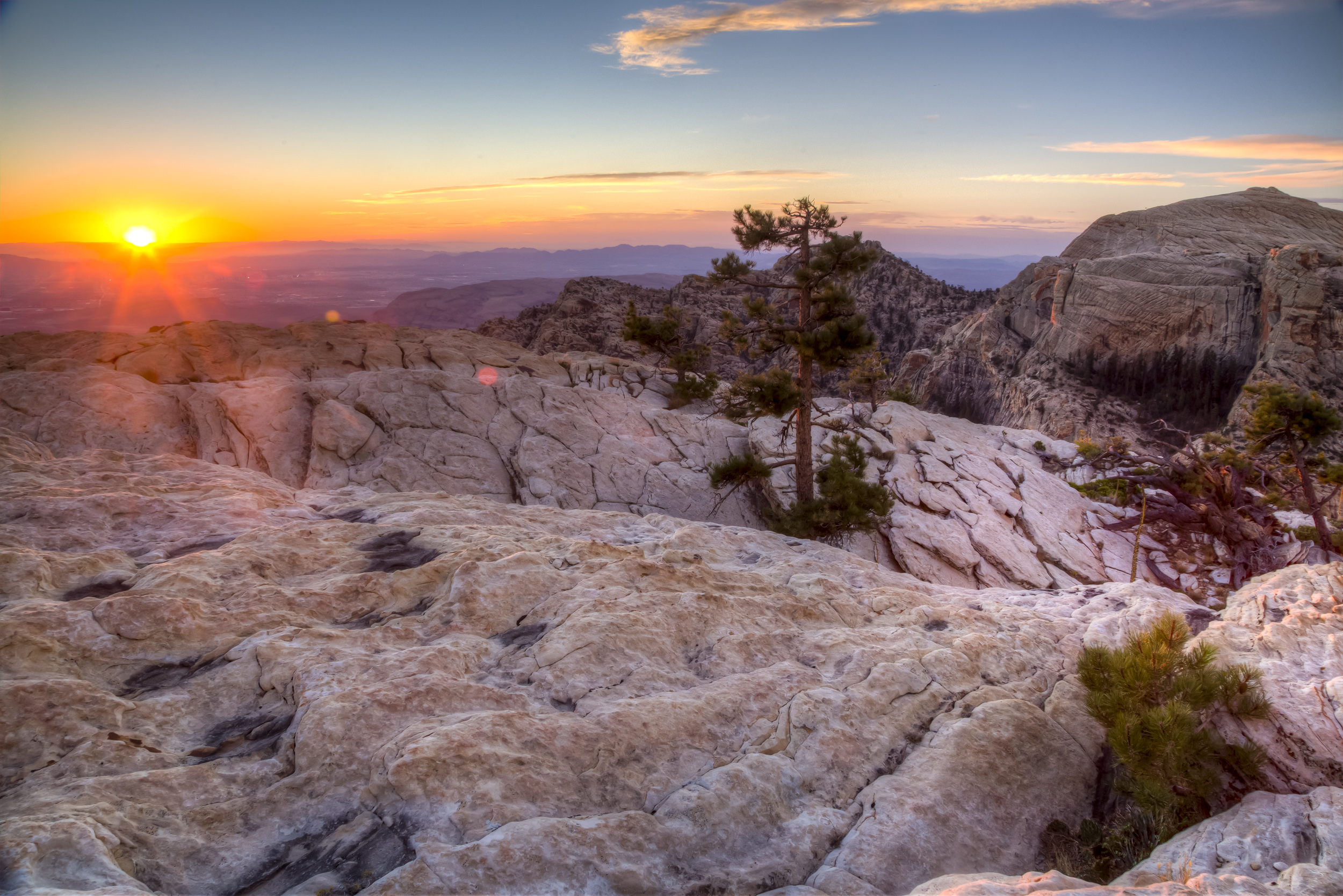
- Red Rock Canyon National Conservation Area

Highest point
- Coordinates: 36°17′53″N 115°39′51″W

Geography
- Location within Nevada
- Location: Near Las Vegas, Nevada, U.S.

The Spring Mountains are a mountain range of Southern Nevada in the United States, running generally northwest–southeast along the west side of Las Vegas and south to the border with California. Most land in the mountains is owned by the United States Forest Service and the Bureau of Land Management and managed as the Spring Mountains National Recreation Area within the Humboldt-Toiyabe National Forest and the Red Rock Canyon National Conservation Area.

== Geography ==
The Spring Mountains range is named for the number of springs to be found, many of them in the recesses of Red Rock Canyon National Conservation Area, which is on the eastern side of the mountains.

The Spring Mountains divide the Pahrump Valley and Amargosa River basins from the Las Vegas Valley watershed, which drains into the Colorado River watershed, by way of Las Vegas Wash into Lake Mead, thus the mountains define part of the boundary of the Great Basin. The Great Basin Divide, (one of the Great Basin region borders) continues north through the Indian Springs Pass region, then turns due east at the perimeter mountain ranges north of Las Vegas.

=== Mount Charleston ===
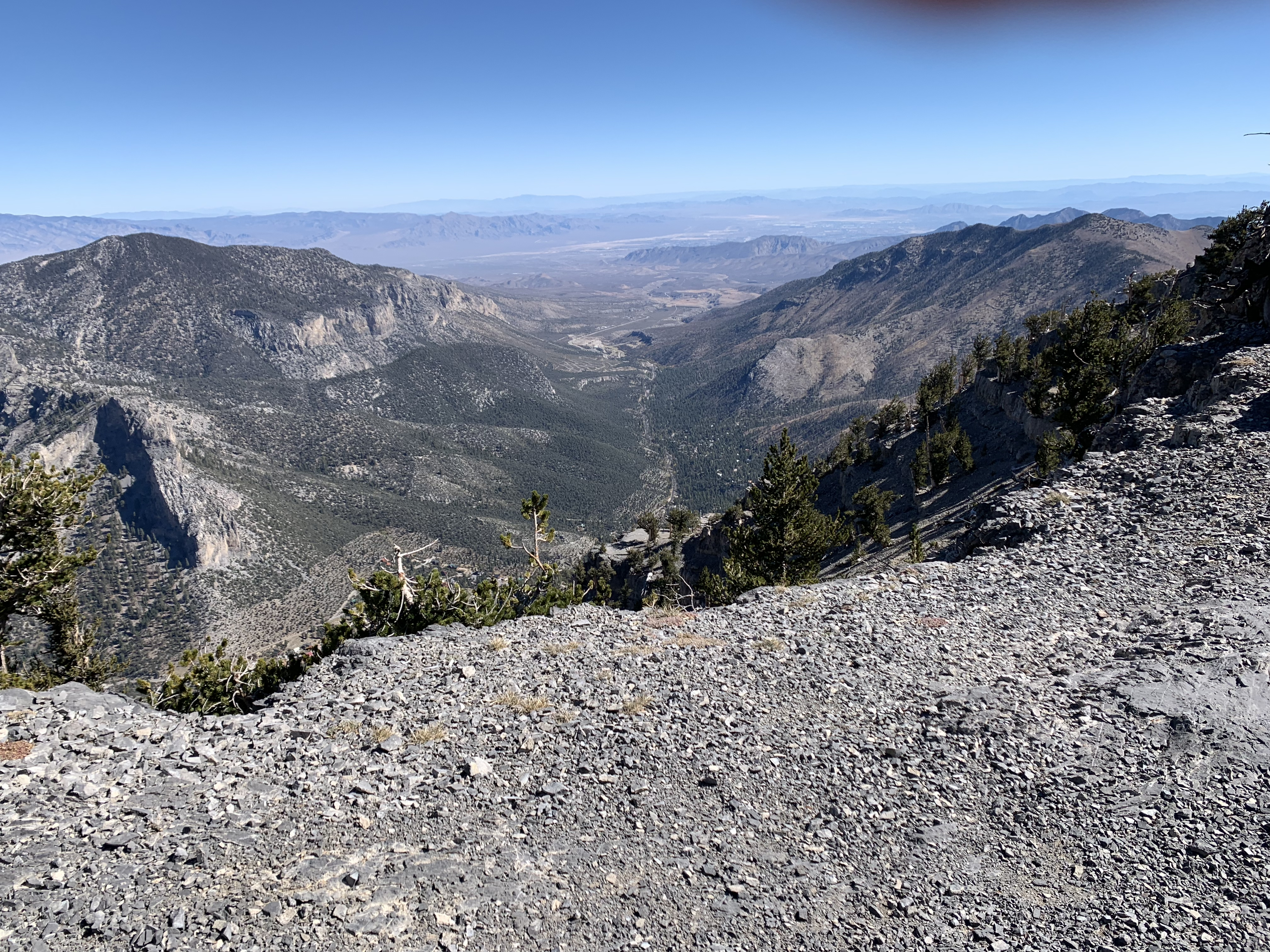
View of Mount Charleston (village) in Kyle Canyon

The highest point is Mount Charleston (officially Charleston Peak), at 11,918 ft (3,633 m). The area around Mount Charleston is protected in the Mount Charleston Wilderness. The main town in the area is also named Mount Charleston (Nevada), which lies in Kyle Canyon. The area is typically 30-40 °F cooler than the valleys below, and it is a popular getaway for Las Vegas residents and visitors. The Lee Canyon (Ski and Snowboard Resort) lies in Lee Canyon on State Highway 156.

=== Strawberry Valley ===
Strawberry Valley is the gap pass on the north point of the Spring Mountains. U.S. Route 95 in Nevada goes through the pass. Nevada State Route 160 is just west of the Strawberry Valley pass.

=== Other peaks ===
In addition to Mount Charleston, other major summits in the Spring Mountains range include Bonanza Peak, McFarland Peak, Mummy Mountain, Griffith Peak, Bridge Mountain, Mount Wilson and Mount Potosi.

== Biological diversity ==
The Spring Mountains are a sky island ecosystem. With an area around 860 square miles (2,200 km^{2}), and a vertical range of nearly 2 miles (3.2 km), the mountains encompass a wide variety of habitats, and the biological diversity is probably greater than anywhere else in Nevada; 37 species of trees are known (more than any other Nevadan range), and 600 species of vascular plants have been reported from the Red Rock Canyon National Conservation Area alone.

The bases of the mountains are part of the Mojave zone dominated by creosote bush and white bursage, then rising to a blackbush scrub zone, followed by a pygmy conifer zone with juniper, pinyon pine, and mountain mahogany, and topped by a montane zone with many species of conifers around Mt. Charleston and its connecting ridges.

There are over 20 endemic species native to the Spring Mountains, including eight species of butterflies. Other endemic fauna include Palmer's chipmunk, the Spring Mountains Springsnail, and the Mount Charleston Ant.

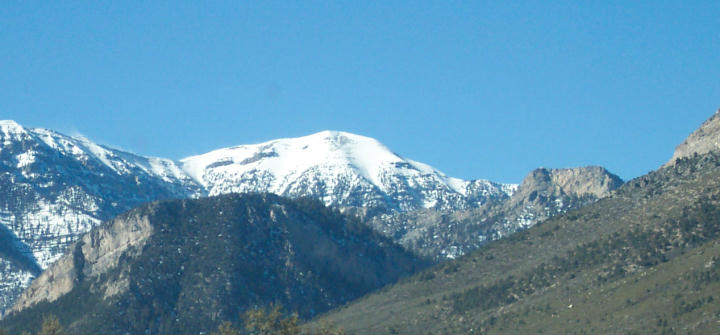
Mount Charleston in the Spring Mountains, Nevada

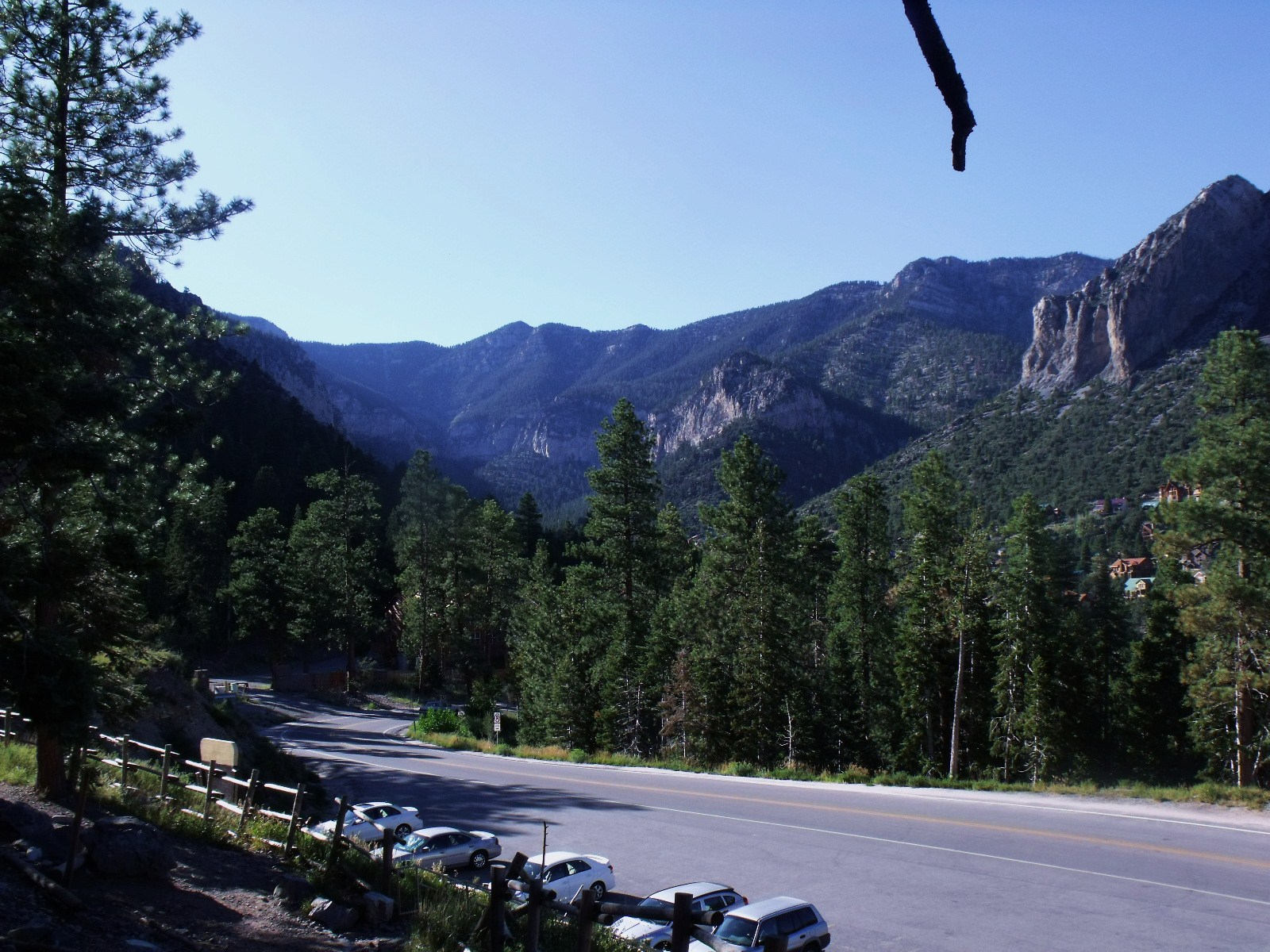
The cool, forested slopes of upper Kyle Canyon

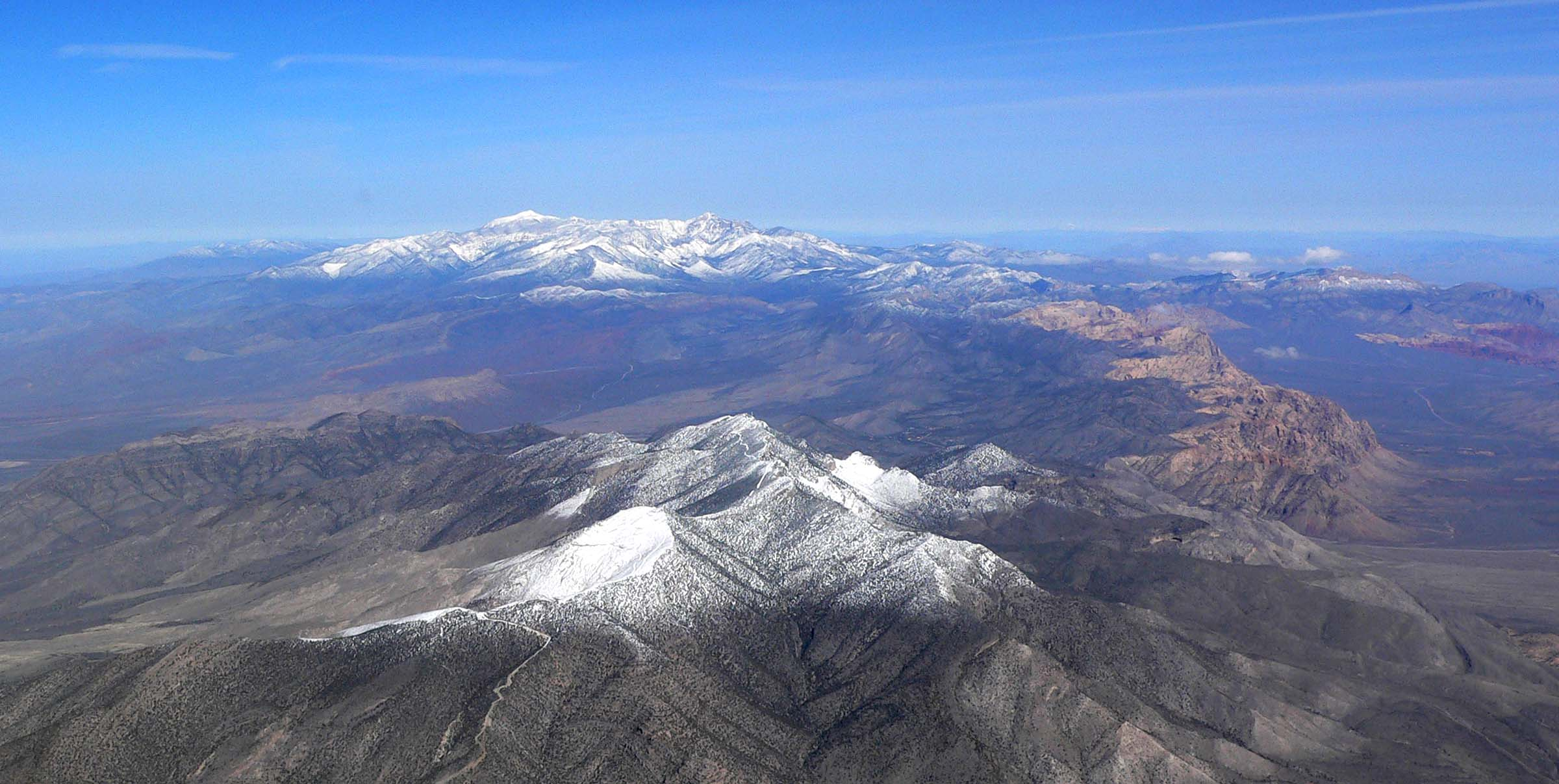
The sandstone reefs of Red Rock are seen to bridge the northern and southern parts of the Spring Mountains, in this aerial view from the south.

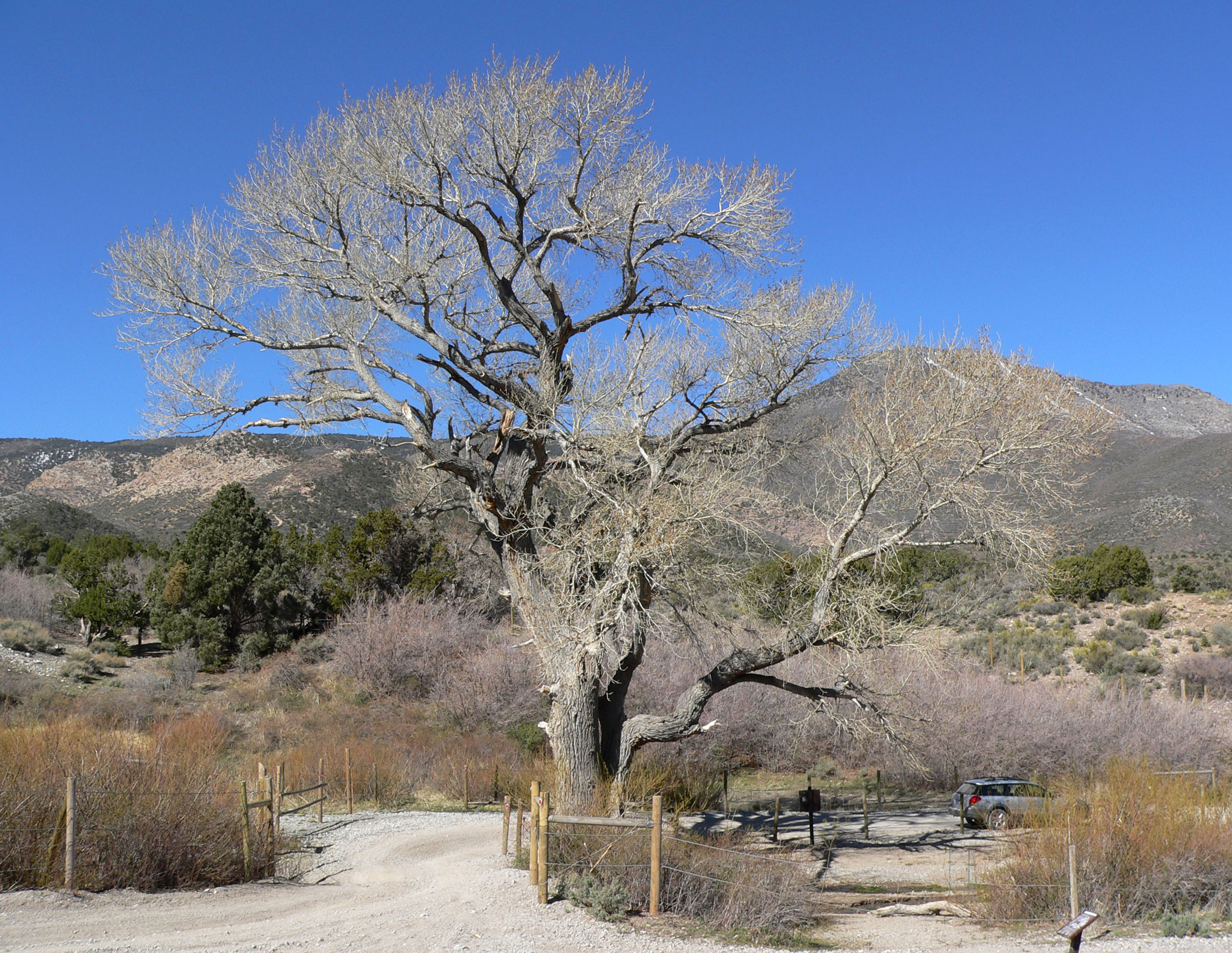
Populus fremontii tree in the Spring Mountains

== See also ==
- Carpenter Canyon
