= Mount Charleston Wilderness =

Protected wilderness in Nevada, US

Mount Charleston Wilderness Area
- IUCN category Ib (wilderness area)
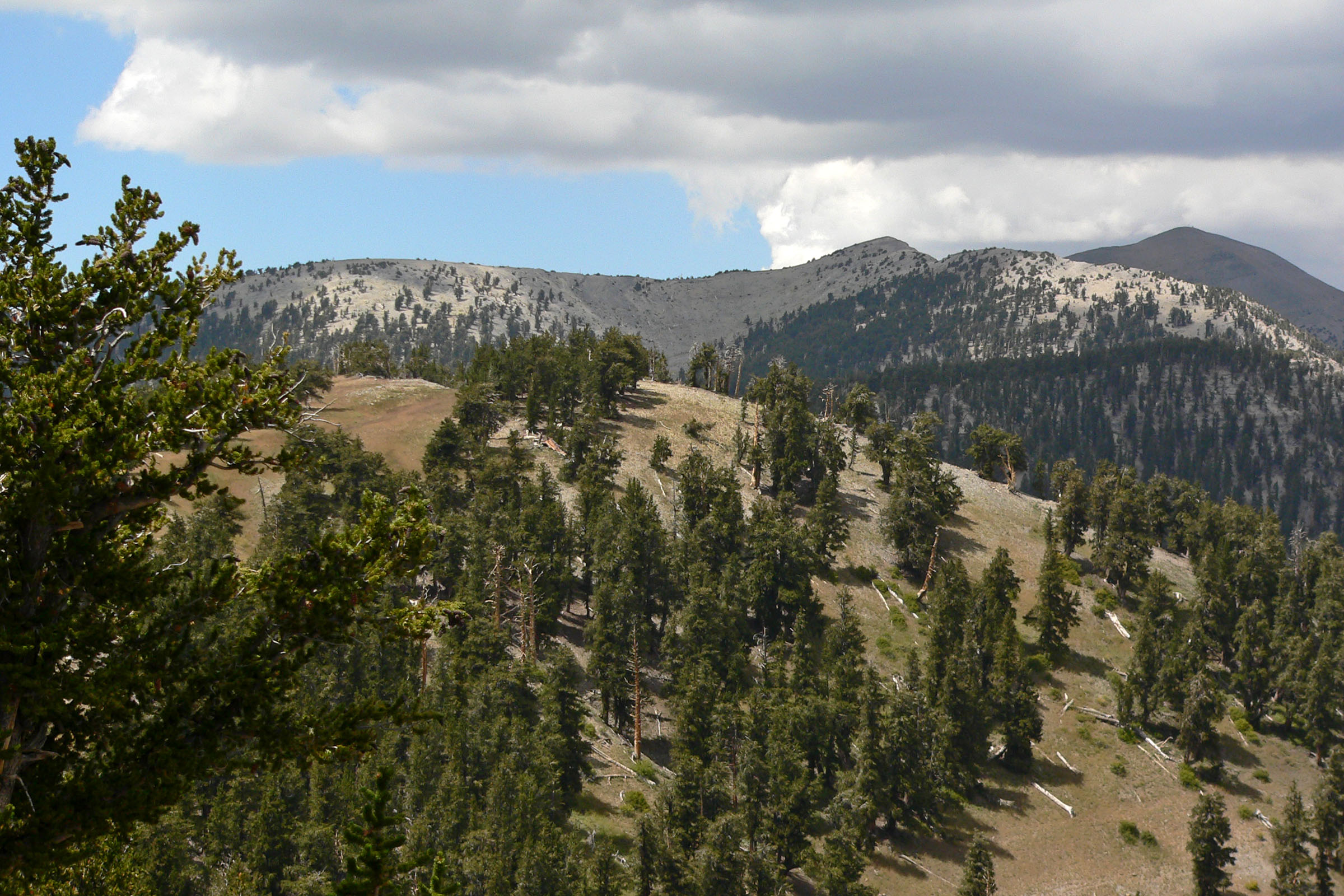
- Bristlecone pines blanket the high ridge between Charleston and Griffith Peaks.

- Location within Nevada Location within the United States
- Location: Clark County, Nevada, United States
- Nearest city: Las Vegas, Nevada
- Coordinates: 36°17′53″N 115°39′51″W
- Area: 57,442 acres (232.46 km^{2})
- Established: January 1, 1989
- Governing body: U.S. Forest Service; Bureau of Land Management

The Mount Charleston Wilderness Area is located west of Las Vegas in the southern part of the state of Nevada in the western United States. It was created by the U.S. Congress in 1989 under the provisions allowed by the Wilderness Act of 1964, and is managed by both the Bureau of Land Management and the U.S. Forest Service.

== Geography ==
The Mount Charleston Wilderness Area consists of a total of 57,442 acres (23,246 ha) of protected wilderness, with the BLM managing 2,142 acres (867 ha) and the rest by the U.S. Forest Service.

The Wilderness Area extends across the entire Spring Mountains Range, including the highest point of Mount Charleston (Charleston Peak), at an elevation of 11,908 ft (3,630 m).

== Habitat ==
- The Mount Charleston Wilderness Area is also home to around 18,000 acres (7,300 ha) of Bristlecone pine and is the largest collection of these trees in the Intermountain Region of the United States.
- The area also provides the only habitat for the only herd of Rocky Mountain Elk located within Clark County, according to the BLM.
- The area is home to the endangered species, Palmer's Chipmunk, and can often be seen at campsites and trails in the area

== Recreation ==
There are some 40 mi (64 km) of trails located within the Mount Charleston Wilderness Area, which can be accessed from the Spring Mountains National Recreation Area, commonly known as Mount Charleston.

== See also ==
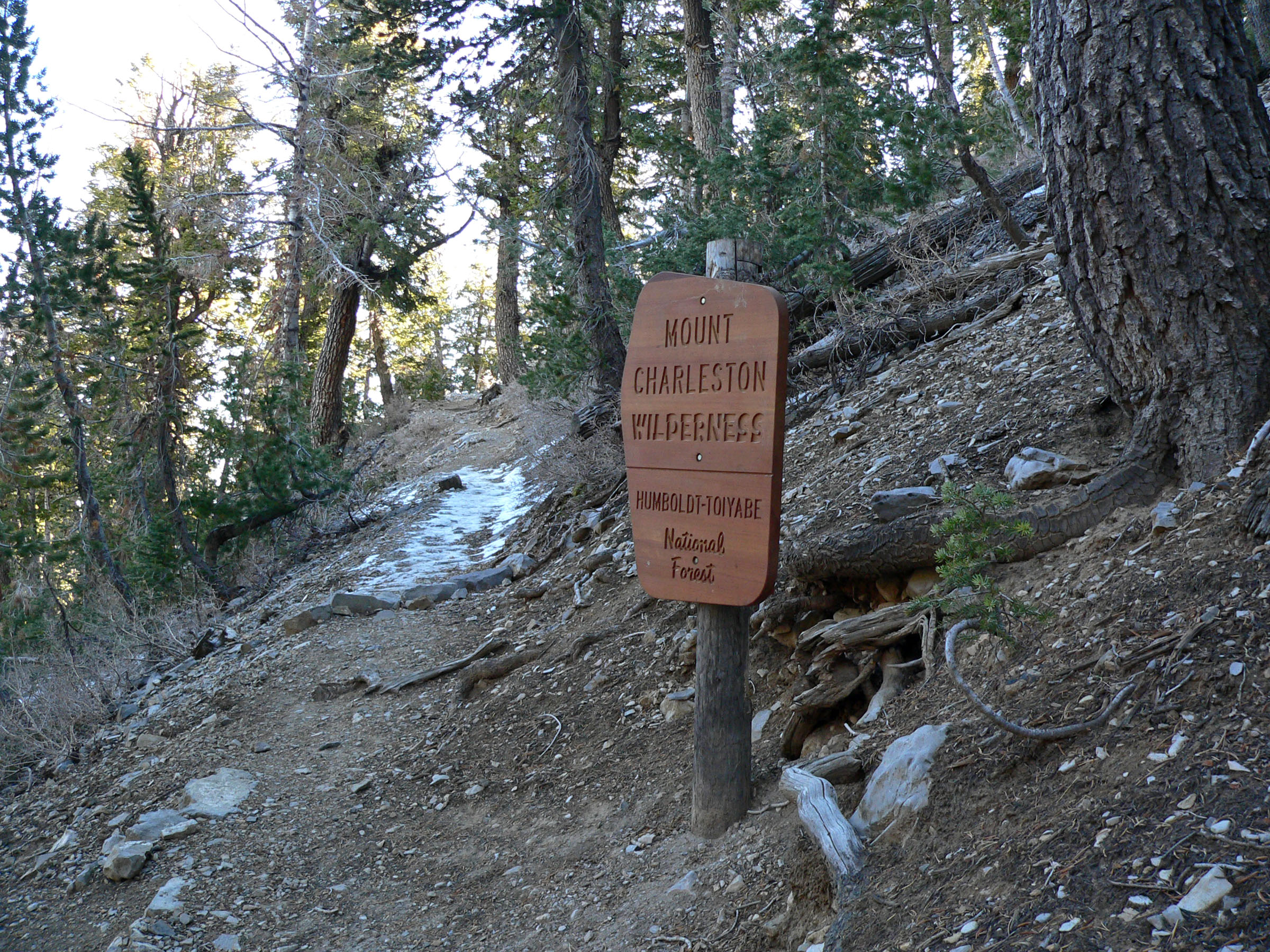
Wilderness area sign alongside the South Loop trail; note remnants of an October snowfall on the path.

- Nevada Wilderness Areas
- List of wilderness areas in Nevada
