= Nevada State Route 659 =

Highway in Nevada

State Route 659
- McCarran Boulevard
- SR 659 highlighted in red

Route information
- Maintained by NDOT
- Length: 22.972 mi (36.970 km)
- Existed: 2009–present
- History: SR 650/651 by July 1, 1976

Major junctions
- Loop around Reno–Sparks, Nevada
- I-80 in Reno; US 395 in Reno; SR 445 in Sparks; I-80 in Sparks US 395 Bus. in Reno

Location
- Country: United States
- State: Nevada
- County: Washoe

Highway system
- Nevada State Highway System; Interstate; US; State; Pre‑1976; Scenic
← SR 655	659	→ SR 667

State Route 659 (SR 659) is a state highway in Washoe County, Nevada. The route follows McCarran Boulevard, an arterial ring road serving the cities of Reno and Sparks. The route provides access to many businesses and residential areas in the Truckee Meadows.

McCarran Boulevard was gradually constructed through the Reno/Sparks area over a period of several years. The portion east of U.S. Route 395 was previously designated as State Route 650 while the western half was designated State Route 651; the two highway numbers were merged into the new SR 659 in 2009.

McCarran Boulevard was named after the late U.S. Senator Pat McCarran, a member of the Democratic Party who contributed to the development of aviation both in Las Vegas and on a national scale and was staunchly anti communist.

== Route description ==
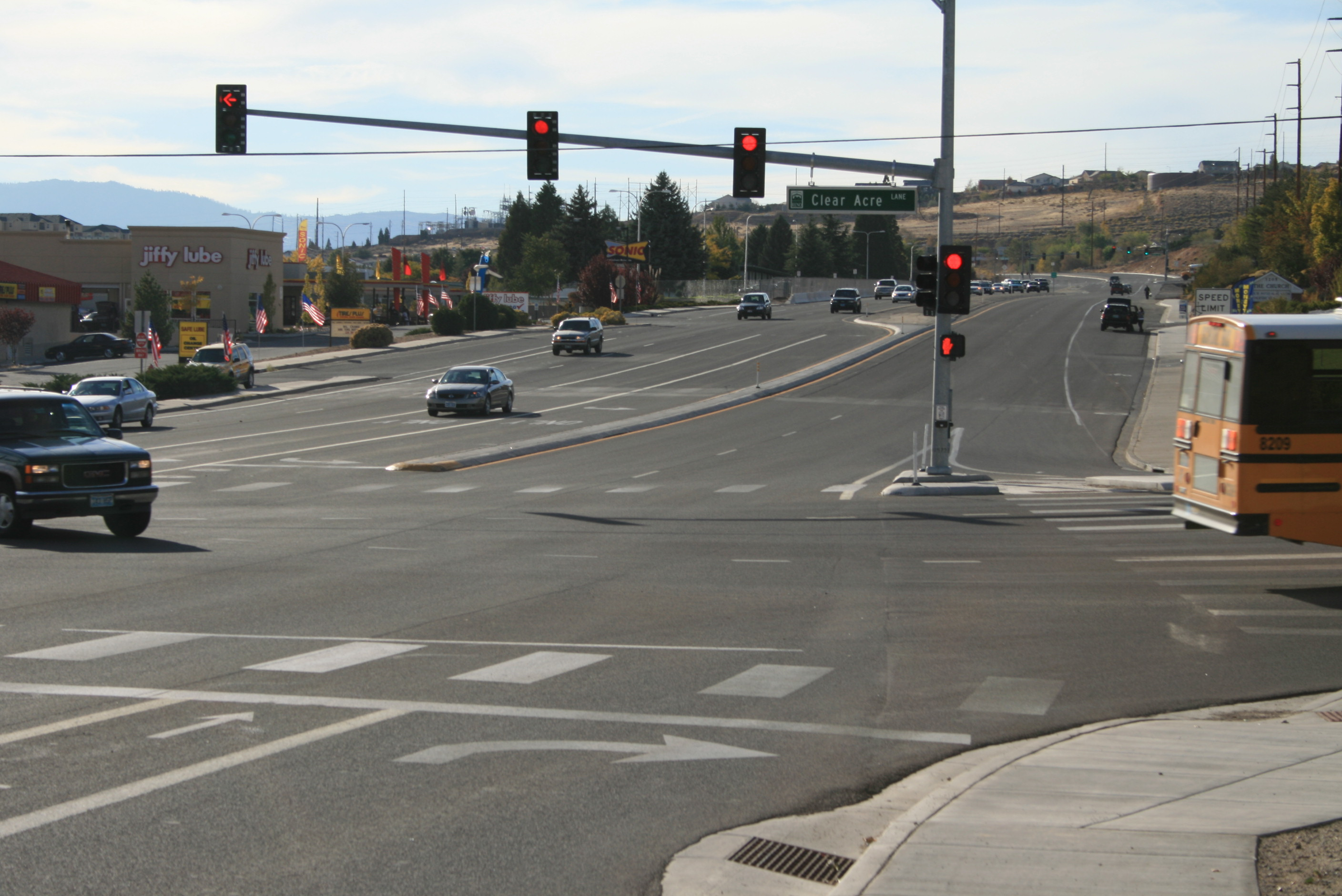
Looking west on SR 659 at Clear Acre Lane (SR 443) as seen in 2008

State Route 659 begins on McCarran Boulevard at an undercrossing of Interstate 580 and U.S. Route 395. From there, the route travels in a clockwise direction westward. This portion of the route is surrounded by major shopping outlets. The highway travels west, gaining in altitude as it winds up and down through residential areas of southwest Reno. The route heads north to cross over the Truckee River and intersect West 4th Street (SR 647/I-80 Bus./Old US 40) and Interstate 80. From here, the highway continues north to skirt the southeastern edge of Peavine Peak in northwest Reno before turning east. The highway then intersects North Virginia Street (SR 430) and runs along the northern boundary of the University of Nevada, Reno campus. The route then intersects Clear Acre Lane (SR 443) before reaching an interchange with US 395.

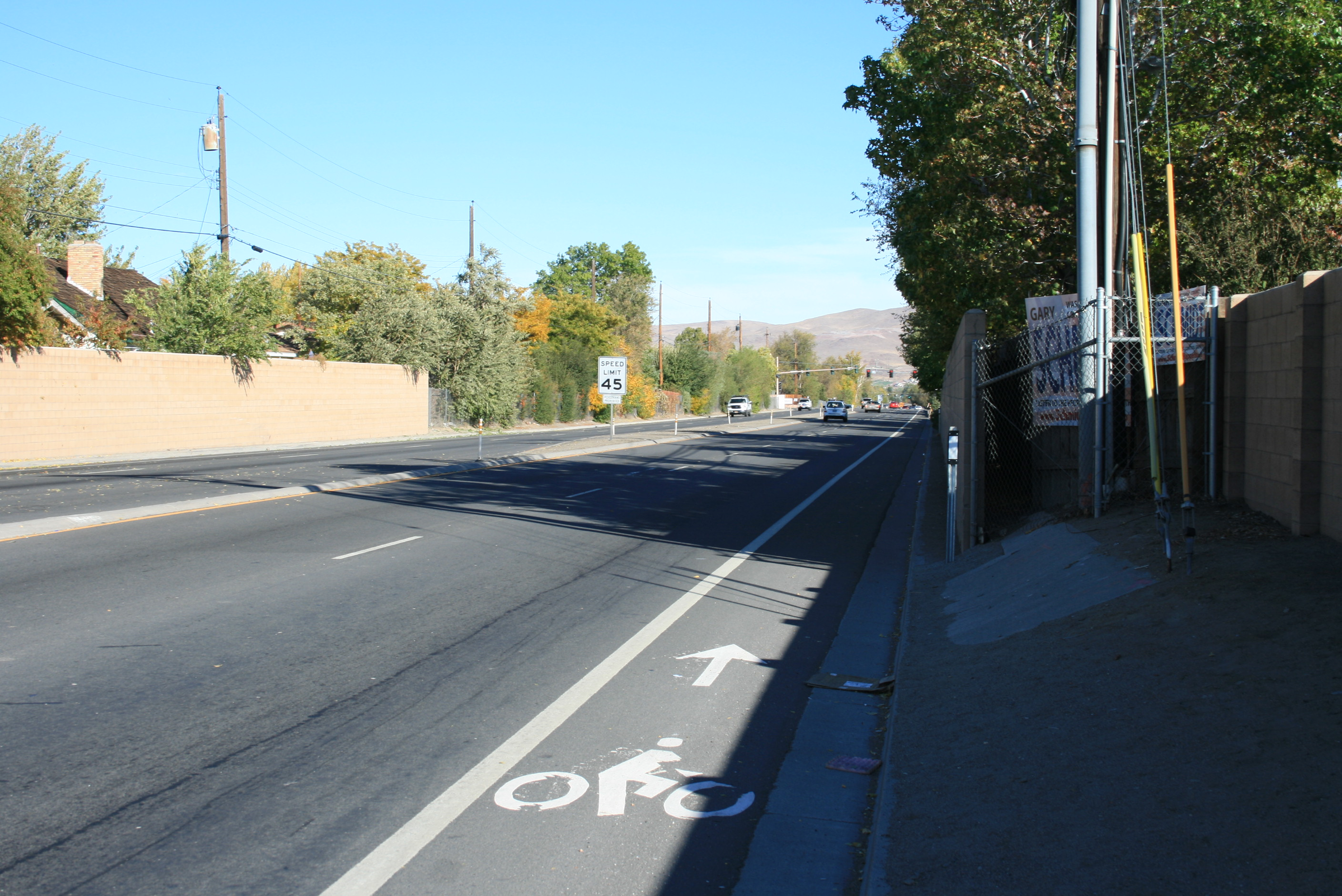
Looking east on SR 659 from Pyramid Way (SR 445) as seen in 2008

Shortly after crossing over US 395, SR 659 enters the city of Sparks. From there, the highway continues easterly to intersect Pyramid Way (SR 445), which provides access to the fast-growing area of northern Sparks known as Spanish Springs as well as Pyramid Lake. McCarran Boulevard heads east and then turns south to intersect Victorian Avenue (I-80 Bus.) and I-80 again before crossing the Truckee River once more.

Passing over the river, the route soon re-enters the Reno city limits. McCarran Boulevard travels southerly through established neighborhoods, then turns to the west. The route becomes more commercial again, passing Meadowood Mall as it heads west to South Virginia Street (US 395 Bus.). The state highway then ends at its origin point underneath the I-580/US 395 overpass.

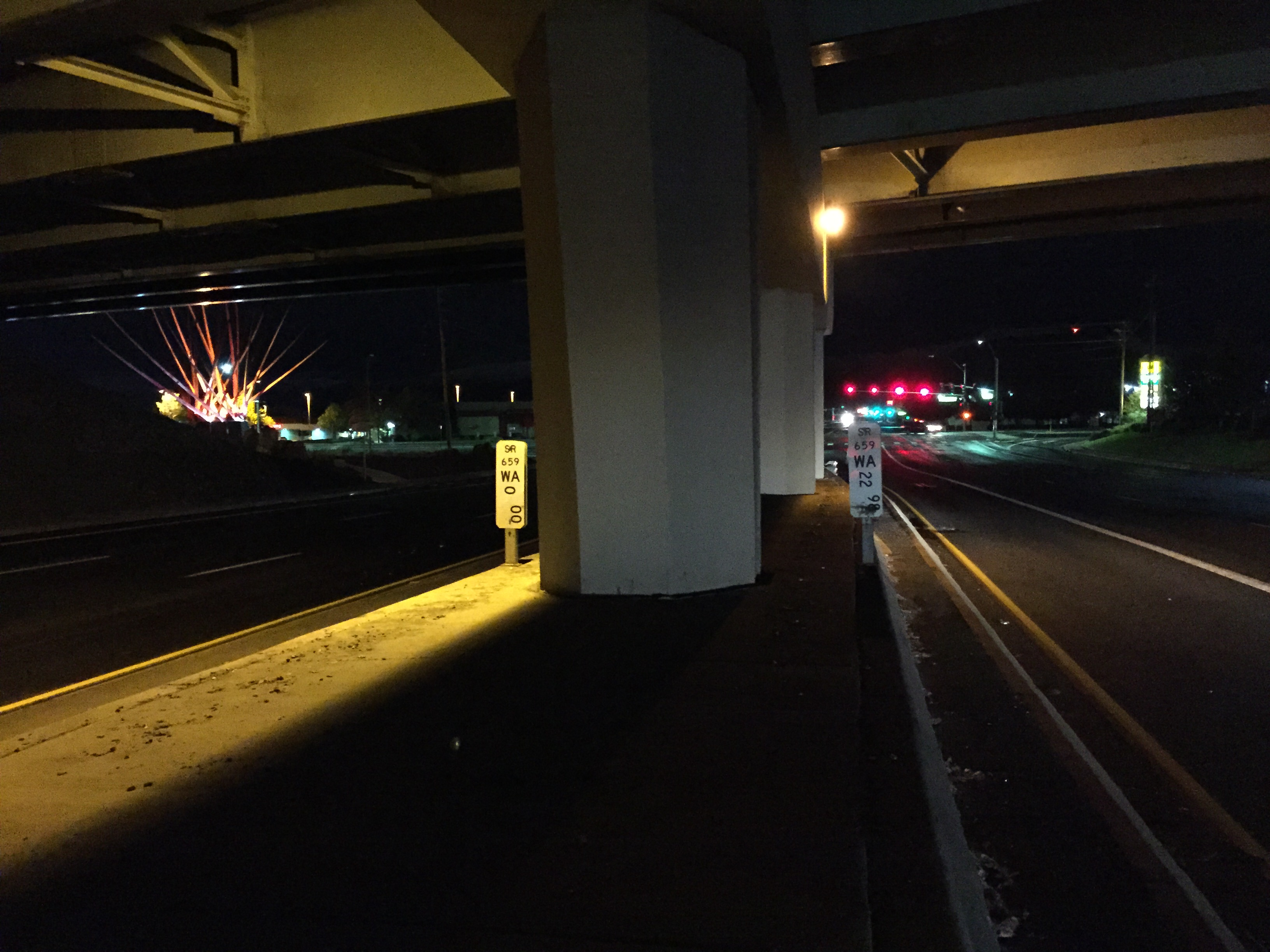
The beginning/end of SR 659 under I-580/US 395, noted by the mileposts indicating 0.00 on one side and 22.98 on the other as seen in 2015

== History ==
When the construction of the McCarran Boulevard loop was completed, the Nevada Department of Transportation maintained the entire roadway, but classified it as two separate highways. Initially, State Route 650 was assigned to the eastern half of the roadway, beginning at US 395 on the north end and circling through Sparks towards US 395 in southern Reno. The western half of McCarran Boulevard was assigned to State Route 651, which began at the same point and traveled in the opposite direction through western Reno. The assignment of the two routes along the entirety of the eastern and western McCarran Boulevard segments could be evidenced by postmile panels which were still present along the highway in late 2007.

By 1999, the southern half of each highway had been relinquished to local control. The remaining state-maintained portion of SR 650 ended near Equity Avenue (just south of Mill Street) in Reno, leaving the route a total length of 6.365 miles (10.243 km). SR 651 was truncated to a distance of 6.630 miles (10.670 km), with a southern terminus at West 4th Street. Although under local maintenance, the relinquished portions of McCarran Boulevard remained part of the National Highway System.

In late July 2009, however, all route shields and mileposts for SR 650 and SR 651 were removed from the highways. These were replaced with new mileposts for State Route 659. The new highway number encompassed all of McCarran Boulevard, with mileage beginning at the I-580/US 395 overpass in south Reno and continuing clockwise around the entire loop.

== Major intersections ==
The entire route is in Washoe County.

Location	mi	km	Destinations	Notes
Reno	0.000	0.000	Interstate 580 / U.S. Route 395 overpass. No access.	
Reno	0.1	0.16	Kietzke Lane	Former SR 667
Reno	6.3	10.1	I-80 BL / SR 647 (West Fourth Street)	Former US 40
Reno	6.8	10.9	Summit Ridge Drive	Interchange
Reno	7.1	11.4	I-80 – Elko, Sacramento	Interchange; I-80 exit 10
Reno	10.6	17.1	US 395 Bus. / SR 430 (North Virginia Street)	Former US 395
Reno	12.4	20.0	SR 443 (Clear Acre Lane) – Sun Valley	
Reno	12.5	20.1	US 395 – Carson City, Susanville	Interchange; US 395 exit 70
Sparks	14.5	23.3	SR 445 (Pyramid Way) – Pyramid Lake	
Sparks	16.9	27.2	I-80 BL (Victorian Avenue)	
Sparks	17.0	27.4	I-80 – Elko, Sacramento	Interchange; I-80 exit 19
Sparks	17.4	28.0	Glendale Avenue (SR 648)	
Reno	22.8	36.7	US 395 Bus. (South Virginia Street)	Former US 395
Reno	22.972	36.970	Interstate 580 / U.S. Route 395 overpass. No access.	
1.000 mi = 1.609 km; 1.000 km = 0.621 mi: Incomplete access
