= Nevada State Route 663 =

Highway in Nevada

State Route 663
- Oddie Boulevard
- SR 663 highlighted in red

Route information
- Maintained by NDOT
- Length: 2.491 mi (4.009 km)
- Existed: 1976–2010

Major junctions
- West end: Sutro Street in Reno
- US 395
- East end: SR 445 in Sparks

Location
- Country: United States
- State: Nevada

Highway system
- Nevada State Highway System; Interstate; US; State; Pre‑1976; Scenic
← SR 660	→ SR 667

State Route 663 (SR 663) was an east–west state highway in Washoe County, Nevada serving the Reno-Sparks area. The route was turned over to local control in 2010.

Oddie Boulevard was named after former Republican U.S. Senator Tasker Oddie.

== Route description ==
SR 663 began at the intersection of Sutro Street and Oddie Boulevard in the city of Reno. From there, the highway followed Oddie Boulevard eastward, passing under U.S. Route 395 to enter the city of Sparks. SR 663 ended at the intersection of Oddie Boulevard and Pyramid Way (SR 445).

== History ==
Prior to the renumbering of Nevada state highways in the 1970s, SR 663 was previously known as State Route 32A.

SR 663 was removed from the state highway system on March 16, 2010. However, as of late 2011, the portion of Oddie Boulevard at the US 395 interchange is still maintained by the Nevada Department of Transportation as a frontage road.

== Major intersections ==
The entire route was in Washoe County.

Location	mi	km	Destinations	Notes
Reno			Sutro Street	
Reno			US 395 – Carson City, Susanville	
Sparks	2.49	4.01	SR 445 (Pyramid Way)	
1.000 mi = 1.609 km; 1.000 km = 0.621 mi
