= Nevada State Route 648 =

Highway in Nevada

State Route 648
- E. Second Street; Glendale Avenue
- SR 648 highlighted in red

Route information
- Maintained by NDOT
- Length: 2.657 mi (4.276 km)

Major junctions
- West end: Kietzke Lane (SR 667) in Reno
- I-580 / US 395 in Reno
- East end: S. McCarran Blvd (SR 659) in Sparks

Location
- Country: United States
- State: Nevada
- County: Washoe

Highway system
- Nevada State Highway System; Interstate; US; State; Pre‑1976; Scenic
| ← SR 647 | → SR 655 |

State Route 648 (SR 648) runs from Kietzke Lane (SR 667) east along E. Second Street in Reno and Glendale Avenue in Sparks to S. McCarran Boulevard (SR 659).

== Route description ==
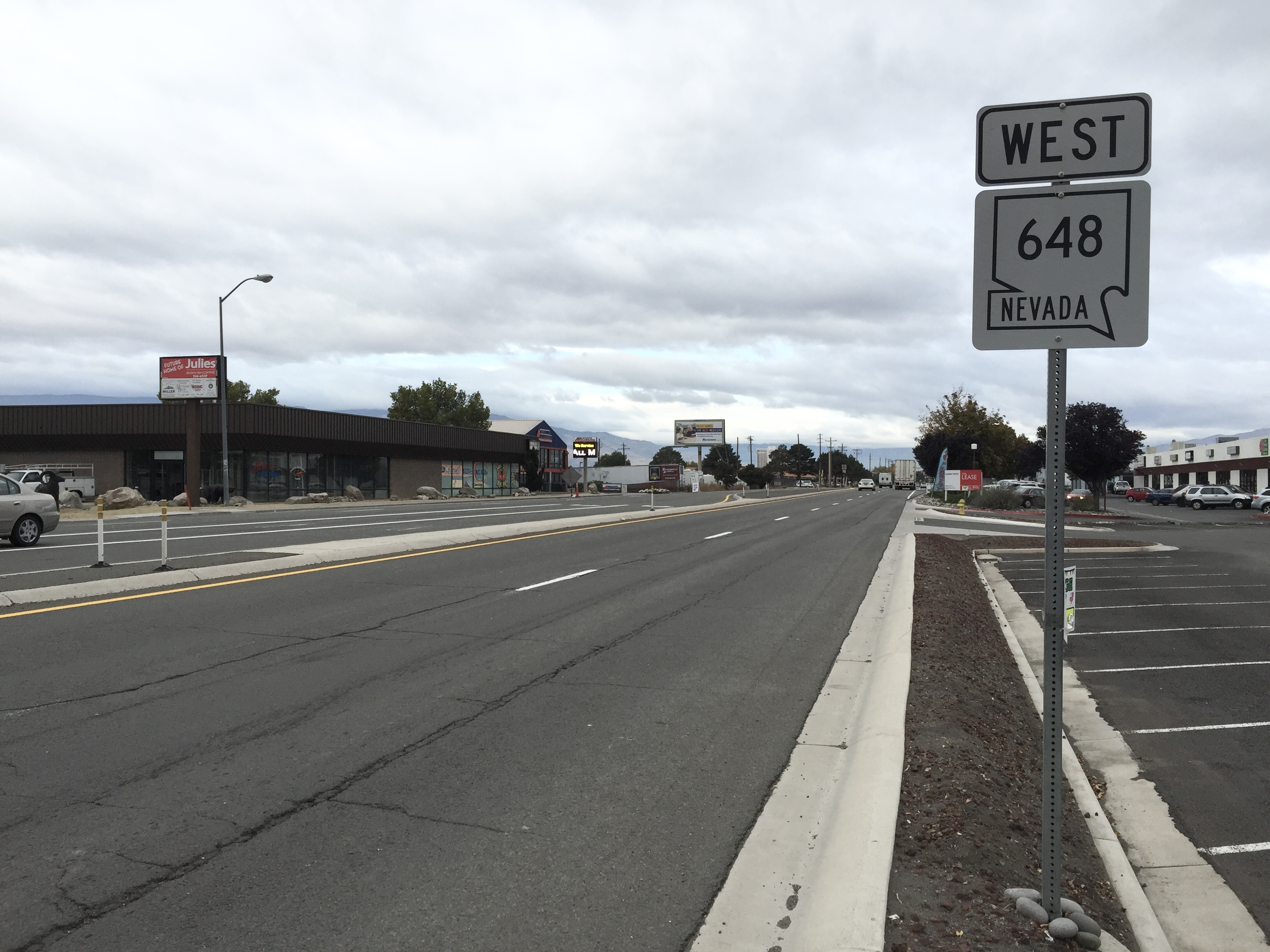
View at the east end of SR 648 looking westbound as seen in 2015

SR 648 begins at the intersection of E. Second Street and Kietzke Lane (SR 667) in Reno. The road follows Second Street eastward, and quickly comes to an interchange with Interstate 580 and US 395, which is also known as the Martin Luther King Jr Memorial Highway and the Three Flags Highway. SR 648 passes over the Truckee River, where it enters Sparks and the road name changes to Glendale Avenue. Passing through an urban area, the road intersects Rock Boulevard (SR 668) heading east. The route terminates at the intersection of Glendale Avenue and McCarran Boulevard (SR 659), a major arterial encircling the Reno-Sparks area.

== History ==
Formerly, State Route 648 continued westward through downtown Reno along Second Street to its terminus at West Fourth Street (SR 647, I-80 Business, Old US 40). By 2001, the highway was truncated to the current segment and a 0.360-mile (0.579 km) segment from Fourth Street east under the Union Pacific Railroad tracks. This western segment was removed by 2005 as the Reno Transportation Rail Access Corridor (ReTRAC) track reconstruction eliminated the Second Street railroad underpass.

== Major intersections ==
The entire route is in Washoe County.

| Location | mi | km | Destinations | Notes |
|---|---|---|---|---|
| Reno | 0.0 | 0.0 | Kietzke Lane (SR 667) | |
| Reno | 0.2 | 0.32 | I-580 / US 395 – Carson City, Susanville | Interchange; I-580 exit 35 |
| Sparks | 1.1 | 1.8 | Rock Boulevard (SR 668) | |
| Sparks | 2.6 | 4.2 | S. McCarran Boulevard (SR 659) | |
1.000 mi = 1.609 km; 1.000 km = 0.621 mi
