= Nevada State Route 443 =

State highway in Washoe County, Nevada, United States

State Route 443
- SR 443 highlighted in red

Route information
- Maintained by NDOT
- Length: 3.197 mi (5.145 km)
- Existed: July 1, 1976–present

Major junctions
- South end: SR 659 in Reno
- US 395 in Reno
- North end: 7th Ave in Sun Valley

Location
- Country: United States
- State: Nevada
- Counties: Washoe

Highway system
- Nevada State Highway System; Interstate; US; State; Pre‑1976; Scenic
← SR 439	→ SR 445

State Route 443 (SR 443) is a state highway in the Reno metropolitan area of Washoe County, Nevada. It is the main connection between the city of Reno and the community of Sun Valley to the north. SR 443 is known as Clear Acre Lane in Reno and Sun Valley Boulevard within Sun Valley.

== Route description ==
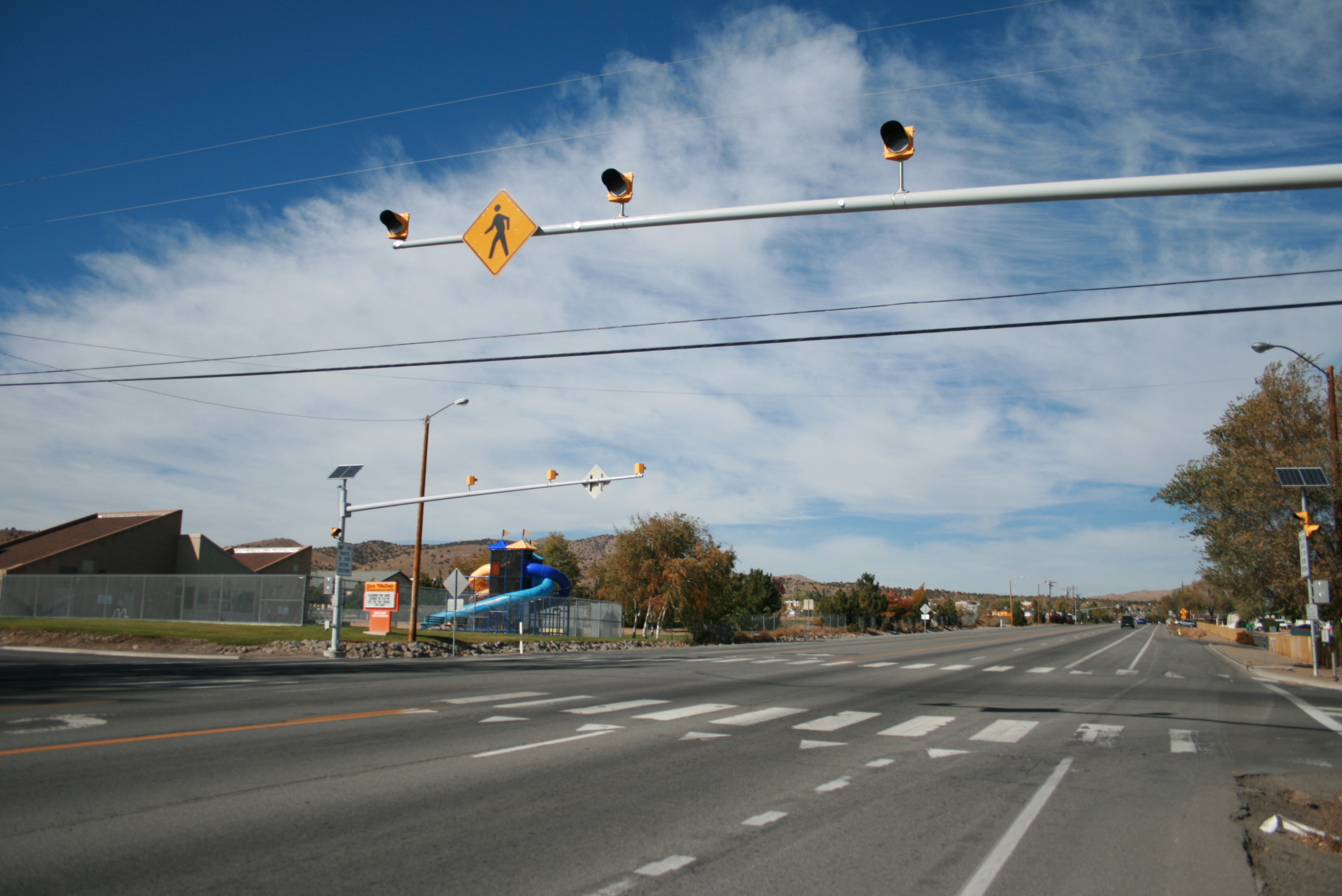
Looking north on SR 443 from 6th Avenue in Sun Valley as seen in 2008

SR 443 begins at its intersection with Nevada State Route 659 (North McCarran Boulevard). Just north of this junction, SR 443 interchanges with US 395. From here, the highway heads slightly northeast to the intersection of Dandini Boulevard & El Rancho Drive, where the road changes names from Clear Acre Lane into Sun Valley Boulevard ("Sun Valley Drive" on some signs). SR 443 continues north from this intersection through Sun Valley, where it terminates at Seventh Avenue.

== History ==
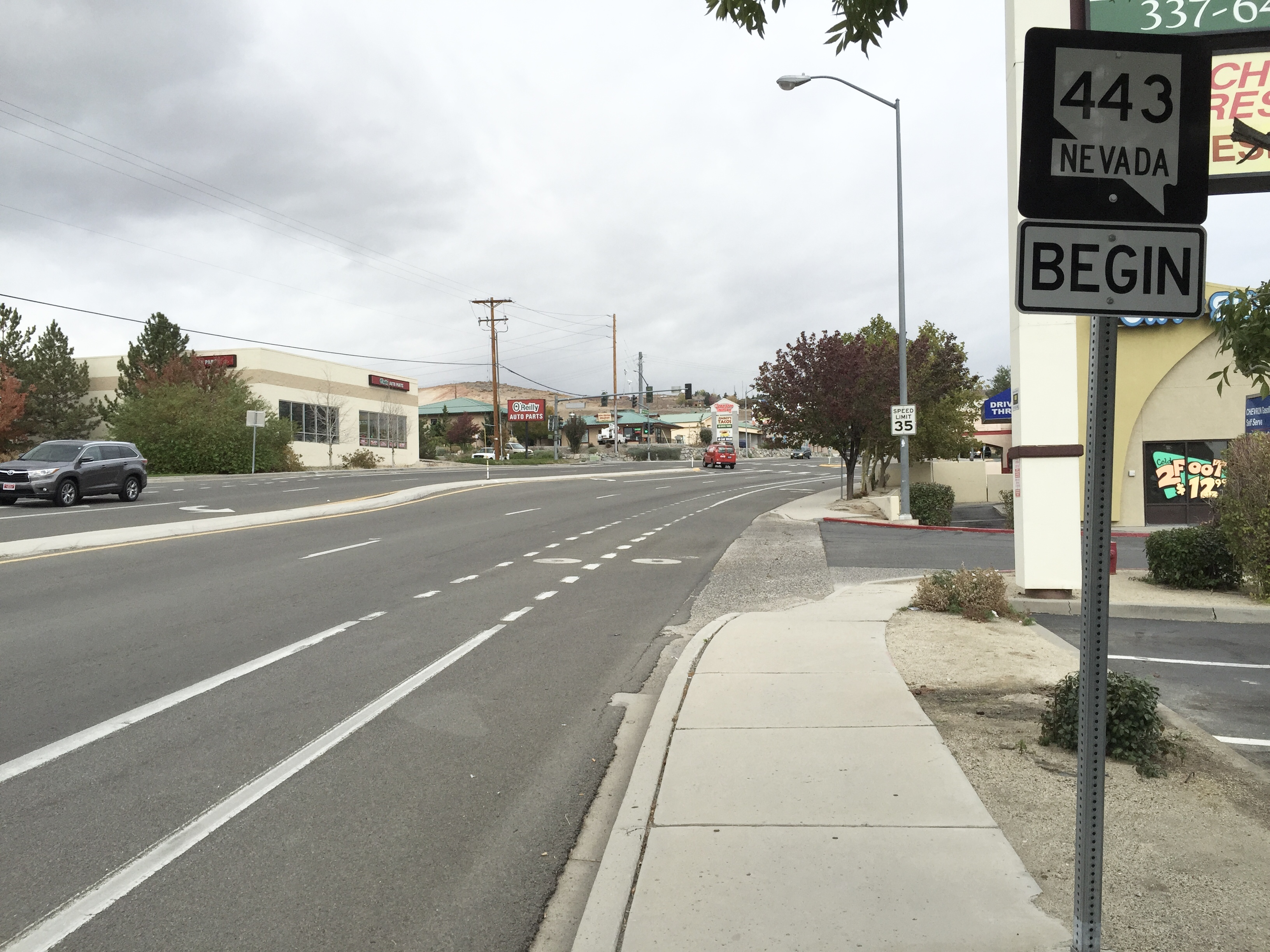
View from the south end of SR 443 looking northbound as seen in 2015

Originally, SR 443 extended further south to terminate at Wedekind Road (former SR 880). By 2006, the highway had been truncated to its current terminus at North McCarran Boulevard.

In 2004, the Regional Transportation Commission of Washoe County began the US 395/Clear Acre reconstruction project. The project created new US 395 freeway access at Clear Acre Lane and reconstructed the North McCarran Boulevard (SR 659) bridge and interchange ramps. Previously, the only access between SR 443 and US 395 was a northbound US 395 off ramp; other movements were made via the nearby McCarran Boulevard interchange. As of June 2007, the construction project was substantially completed.

== Major intersections ==
The entire route is in Washoe County.

Location	mi	km	Destinations	Notes
Reno	0.000	0.000	Clear Acre Ln south	Continuation south from southern terminus
Reno	0.000	0.000	SR 659 clockwise (North McCarran Blvd) – Sparks; SR 659 counter-clockwise (North McCarran Blvd) – Sparks	Southern terminus; formerly SR 651
Reno			US 395 north (Martin Luther King, Jr. Memorial Hwy) – Hallelujah Junction CA, Susanville CA US 395 south (Martin Luther King, Jr. Memorial Hwy) – Old US 395, Carson City	Modified diamond interchange: US 395 exit 70
Sun Valley	3.197	5.145	Seventh Ave east – Sparks; Seventh Ave west – Golden Valley, Reno	Northern terminus
Sun Valley	3.197	5.145	Sun Valley Blvd north – Sparks	Continuation north from northern terminus
1.000 mi = 1.609 km; 1.000 km = 0.621 mi

== See also ==
- List of state highways in Nevada[
