= U.S. Route 395 Business (Reno, Nevada) =

Business route in Reno, Nevada

U.S. Route 395 Business
- Virginia Street
- US 395 Bus. highlighted in red

Route information
- Maintained by City of Reno and NDOT (SR 430 and US 395 Alt. portion)

Major junctions
- South end: I-580 / US 395 / US 395 Alt. in Reno
- North end: US 395 in Reno

Location
- Country: United States
- State: Nevada
- County: Washoe

Highway system
- United States Numbered Highway System; List; Special; Divided; Nevada State Highway System; Interstate; US; State; Pre‑1976; Scenic
← SR 427	SR 430	→ SR 431

U.S. Route 395 Business (US 395 Bus.) is a north–south state highway in Reno, Nevada. The highway follows Virginia Street, the primary north–south arterial street of the area. US 395 is also designated as State Route 430 (SR 430) from its intersection with SR 659 (McCarran Boulevard) to its northern terminus at US 395.

US 395 Bus. is the former alignment of US 395 through Reno before a new freeway was constructed. The route passes through Reno's downtown and is known for its popular tourist landmarks.

== Route description ==
As Virginia Street passes north under Interstate 580 (I-580) and US 395 freeway on the south end of Reno, the US 395 Bus. designation begins along the road (concurrent with US 395 Alternate, US 395 Alt.). The roadway turns slightly westward as it travels further north into Reno. In about three miles (4.8 km), the highway again meets the I-580/US 395 freeway. The alternate route ends just north of here, at the intersection with Patriot Boulevard; US 395 Bus., however continues to follow Virginia Street northward.

Beyond the terminus of the alternate route, businesses appear more frequently along the arterial. Large retail stores, shopping malls and restaurants begin to line the sides of the business route. After passing another interchange with I-580/US 395 and the junction with Kietzke Lane, the Reno-Sparks Convention Center can be seen along the east side of the road, along with larger casino properties and additional businesses as the route continues north. Passing north of California Avenue, Virginia Street narrows down and reaches Downtown Reno. Seen amongst other businesses along the highway are major office buildings, government institutions and cultural centers.

In the center of Reno, US 395 Bus. crosses over the Truckee River on the Virginia Street Bridge. The river crossing dates back to 1860, prior to the Reno's existence as "Lake's Crossing". On the opposite side of the river crossing, US 395 Bus. enters the downtown core. Each side of the highway is lined with numerous casinos and small businesses. Portions of Virginia Street between First Street and Sixth Street are frequently closed to vehicular traffic (most often in the summertime) to host special events that attract tourists and locals to the downtown area; such events include Hot August Nights, Street Vibrations, parades and other activities. A notable landmark along this stretch of roadway is the Biggest Little City in the World sign. Located at Virginia Street and Commercial Row (just south of Third Street), the current version of this famous arch was erected in 1987.

North of downtown, the business route intersects I-80 as it heads away from the casinos. Just past the Interstate, US 395 Bus. encounters the University of Nevada, Reno campus. Academic buildings, residence halls, the student union, Lawlor Events Center, Fleischmann Planetarium and Mackay Stadium are several of the university buildings visible from Virginia Street, which follows the western border of the campus.

=== State Route 430 ===
State Route 430
- Location: Reno, Nevada
- Length: 3.158 mi (5.082 km)
- Existed: July 1, 1976–present

State Route 430 begins as Virginia Street crosses North McCarran Boulevard (SR 659). Roadside businesses taper off as the route travels north out of Reno, paralleling the Union Pacific railroad tracks heading towards northern California. Both SR 430 and US 395 Bus. terminate at the route's final interchange with US 395 near Panther Valley north of Reno.

SR 430 was previously a much longer route, extending from the northern reaches of Reno all the way through Washoe City along Virginia Street and the Carson–Reno highway. The entirety of the route formerly served as the mainline alignment of US 395 before being bypassed by freeway segments. Most of SR 430 has gradually been phased out by either being turned over to local control or becoming part of U.S. Route 395 Alt.

== History ==
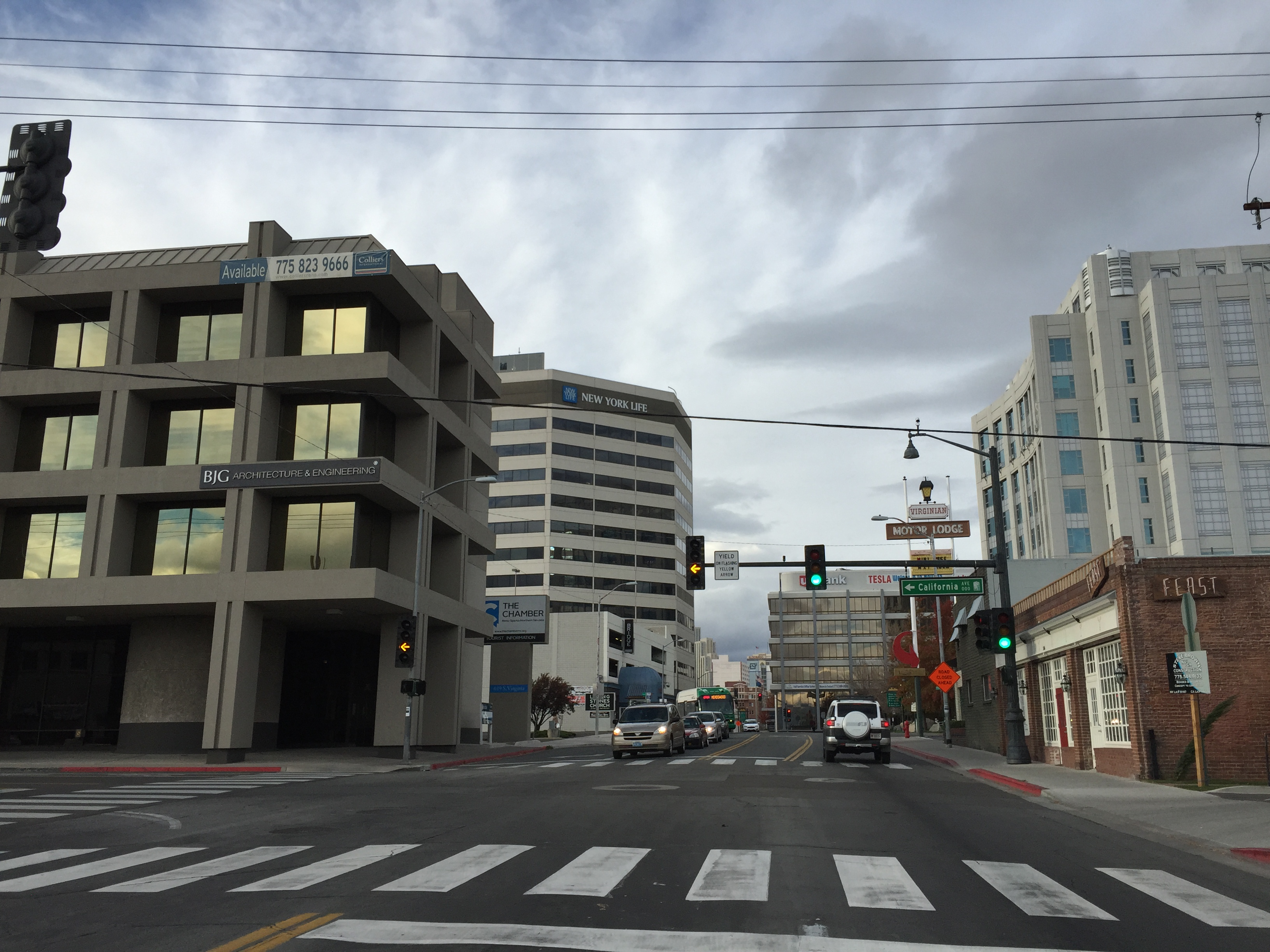
View north along Virginia Street in Downtown Reno as seen in 2015

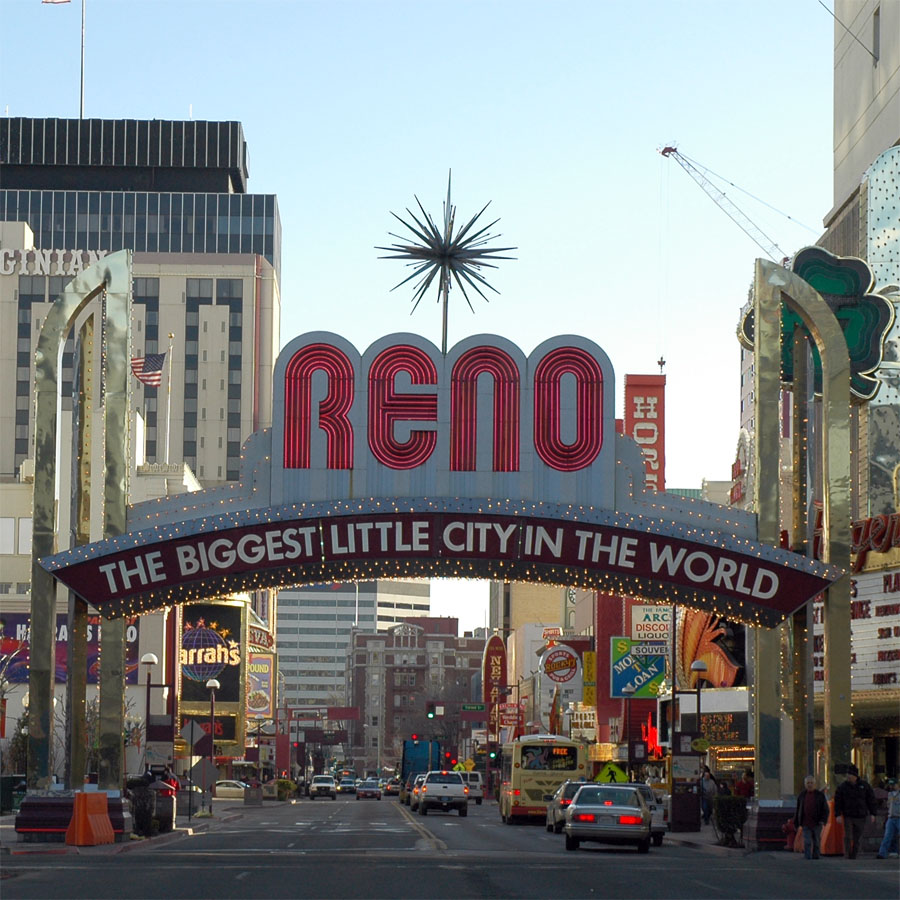
Looking south as seen in 2007, Virginia Street passes under the famous Reno Arch

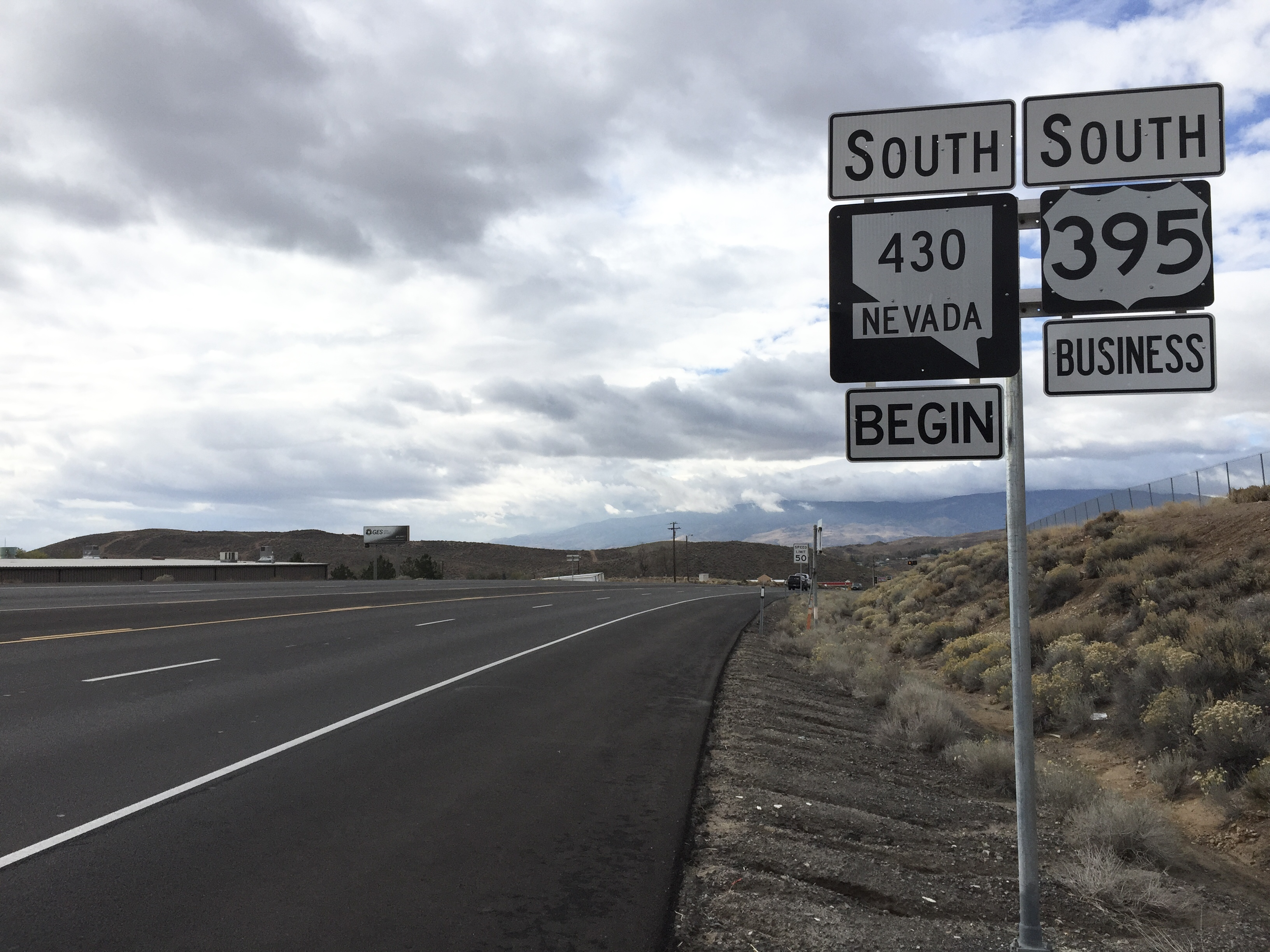
View from the north end of SR 430 looking southbound as seen in 2015

US 395 Bus. is the original routing of US 395 through the Reno area. The US 395 designation was removed from Virginia Street and added to the new highway segmentally as new stretches of freeway were completed. SR 430 was designated as US 395 Bus. for some time after the freeway was completed. By 2001, any US 395 Bus. shields on Virginia Street had been removed; however, a few business shields remain on older overhead guide signs in the Reno area.

In 2001, the gap between the two segments of SR 430 along Virginia Street was much smaller. The southern section had a northern terminus at the intersection with Plumb Lane (SR 653). However, the state maintained part of South Virginia Street was truncated to the I-580 half interchange by 2006. More of SR 430 was given to local control by 2008, when the northern terminus of the southern section was moved to Patriot Boulevard. Also in 2001, the northern segment of SR 430 had a southern terminus at I-80. However, the portion of North Virginia Street along the west edge of the University of Nevada, Reno between I-80 and North McCarran Boulevard (SR 659) was relinquished to the City of Reno by January 2008.

== Major intersections ==
The major intersections table lists junctions for both US 395 Bus. and SR 430. Mileposts for both routes are continuous and based on the former alignment of US 395.

The entire route is in Reno, Washoe County.

mi	km	Destinations	Notes
17.00	27.36	US 395 Alt. south (S. Virginia Street) – Virginia City, Washoe City	Continuation beyond southern terminus; former SR 430 south/US 395 south
17.00	27.36	I-580 north / US 395 north – Reno, Susanville	Interchange; northbound entrance and southbound exit; southern terminus of US 395 Bus.; southern end of US 395 Alt. concurrency; I-580 exit 25
		South Meadows Parkway (SR 426 east) / Foothill Road	Western terminus of SR 426
19.80	31.87	Holcomb Ranch Lane (SR 671 north)	Southern terminus of SR 671
20.10	32.35	I-580 / US 395 – Carson City, Susanville	Interchange; no northbound exit to S. Virginia Street south; I-580 exit 29
		Patriot Boulevard	Northern end of US 395 Alt. concurrency and state maintenance
		Longley Lane / Huffaker Lane	Huffaker Lane was formerly part of SR 671 south
22.30	35.89	S. McCarran Boulevard (SR 659)	
		I-580 north / US 395 north – Susanville	Interchange; northbound entrance and southbound exit; I-580 exit 31
22.70	36.53	Kietzke Lane (SR 667 north)	Former SR 667 south
24.29	39.09	Plumb Lane	Former SR 653 east
		Virginia Street Bridge over the Truckee River	
		W. 4th Street (I-80 Bus.)	Former US 40
		I-80 – Elko, Sacramento	Interchange; I-80 exit 13
25.57	41.15	N. McCarran Boulevard (SR 659)	Southern terminus of SR 430 and state maintenance; N. McCarran Boulevard was formerly part of SR 651
		N. Virginia Street, Panther Drive	N. Virginia Street was formerly part of US 395 north
		US 395 – Reno, Susanville	Interchange; northern terminus of US 395 Bus. and SR 430; US 395 exit 72
1.000 mi = 1.609 km; 1.000 km = 0.621 mi: Concurrency terminus; Incomplete access
