= Nevada State Route 667 =

Highway in Nevada

State Route 667
- Kietzke Lane
- SR 667 highlighted in red

Route information
- Maintained by NDOT
- Length: 3.836 mi (6.173 km)
- Existed: July 1, 1976–present

Major junctions
- South end: US 395 Bus. in Reno
- SR 653 in Reno; SR 648 in Reno
- North end: Galletti Way at the Reno–Sparks city line

Location
- Country: United States
- State: Nevada
- County: Washoe

Highway system
- Nevada State Highway System; Interstate; US; State; Pre‑1976; Scenic
← SR 659	→ SR 671

State Route 667 (SR 667) is a state highway in the Reno-Sparks metropolitan area of Washoe County, Nevada. It follows a portion of Kietzke Lane, a major north–south arterial in the area.

== Route description ==
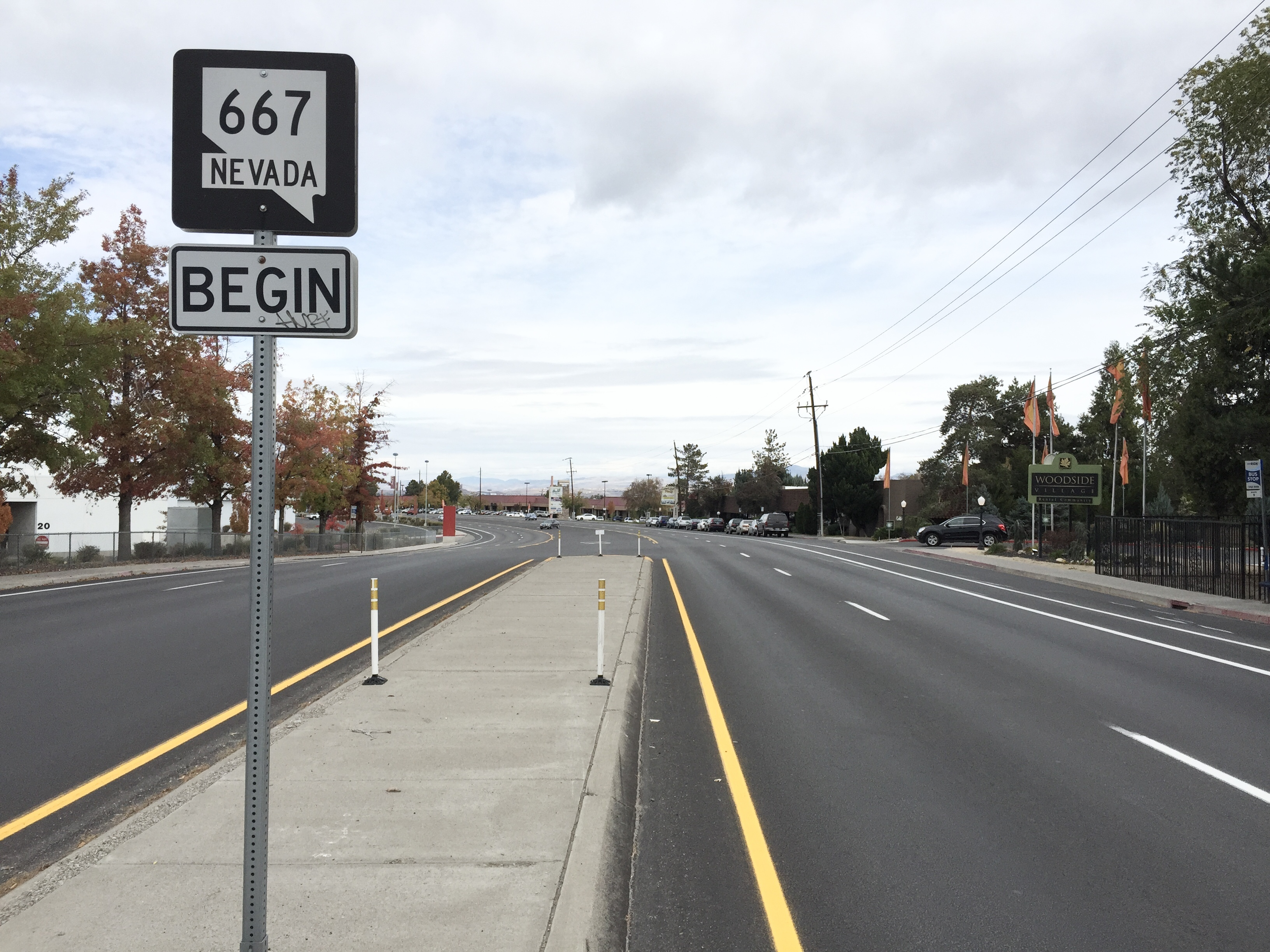
View at the south end of SR 667 looking northbound as seen in 2015

State Route 667 begins at its junction with S. Virginia Street (U.S. Route 395 Business, former SR 430) in Reno and continues due north a few miles. Once passing E. Second Street (SR 648), SR 667 curves east to cross over the Truckee River and pass under Interstate 580 (I-580) and U.S. Route 395 (US 395) to its northern terminus at Galletti Way at the Sparks–Reno city line. Kietzke Lane continues past the terminus of SR 667 to Victorian Avenue (I-80 Business).

== History ==
During the late 1970s, US 395 in Reno was being upgraded to a freeway. By 1976, the new North–South Freeway, now signed as US 395 (and I-580, as of 2012), had been completed from the north of Reno down to E. Second Street. To facilitate the connection with existing US 395 in south Reno, Temporary US 395 was designated by 1976. The temporary designation went west from the freeway terminus along E. Second Street to Kietzke Lane, and then followed present-day State Route 667 south from E. Second Street to S. Virginia Street, where it intersected with US 395. By 1982, the US 395 freeway had been completed to S. Virginia Street, eliminating the Temporary designation on SR 667.

As late as 2006, State Route 667 continued along Kietzke Lane south from South Virginia Street to its intersection with Neil Road. From there, the route turned east and followed Neil Road to connect with I-580 / US 395 before terminating at S. Virginia Street (SR 430). As of 2008, this portion of State Route 667 has been removed from the state highway system; however, the portion of Neil Road under I-580 / US 395 is currently maintained by Nevada DOT as a frontage road (FRWA44).

The Neil Road section of State Route 667 was previously known as Del Monte Lane. The name change was made in the mid-2000s to help eliminate confusion between "Del Monte" and "Damonte" (as in Damonte Ranch Parkway, another I-580 / US 395 exit further south). The similar-sounding names had been an issue for emergency personnel responding to incidents on or near I-580 / US 395.

By 2017, the portion of SR 667 in Sparks (Galletti Way to Victorian Avenue) was mostly turned over to local control and later renamed Battle Born Way; the portion of SR 667 near the I-80 overpass was retained under state maintenance as frontage road FRWA59.

== Major intersections ==
The entire route is in Washoe County.

Location	mi (Note: Mileposts along SR 667 do not reflect the actual length of the route.)	km	Destinations	Notes
Reno	22.54	36.27	S. Virginia Street (US 395 Bus.)	Former SR 430/US 395
Reno	24.21	38.96	SR 653 (Plumb Lane) – Reno–Tahoe International Airport	
Reno	25.32	40.75	E. Second Street (SR 648)	
Reno			Bridge over the Truckee River	
Reno–Sparks city line			Galletti Way	
1.000 mi = 1.609 km; 1.000 km = 0.621 mi
