= Shayden Summit =

- Location: Reno, Nevada, United States
- Coordinates: 39.4045°N 119.7505°W
- Opened: 2007
- Manager: Gallelli Real Estate
- Owner: Rhino Investments Group
- Num. of anchor tenants: 5
- Website: Shayden Summit

Shayden Summit Reno (formerly The Summit Sierra and The Summit Reno) is an upscale lifestyle center located in Reno, Nevada, United States. The center opened in 2007 and is anchored by the Reno metropolitan area's (and, to a fuller extent, Northern Nevada's) only Dillard's. Shayden Summit is owned by Nevada-based Rhino Investments Group.

Shayden Summit consists of more than 65 stores with different goods. It is located at the address of 13925 South Virginia Street, at the junction of I-580/US 395 and State Route 431 (alternatively known as the Mount Rose Highway). Venues include both retail shops and dining restaurants. Sometimes, fountains, and live music are featured, especially during the holiday shopping season.

Shayden Summit also features the Century Summit Sierra movie theater (named for the former name of the shopping center), which often showcases first-run Hollywood movies.

Construction has begun on an Amazon warehouse directly across from the Shayden Summit, being dubbed "580 South." This is taking place on 88 acres of land on the other side of the Old U.S. 395 and Mount Rose Highway intersection.

== Anchor tenants ==
- Century Theatres
- Dillard's
- Old Navy
- Trader Joe's
- Dave & Buster's (Now Open)
