= Hidden Valley Regional Park =

Regional park in Reno, Nevada

- Wild horses in the park in 2018
- Interactive map of Hidden Valley Regional Park
- Type: Regional park
- Location: Southeast Reno, Nevada, United States
- Coordinates: 39°29′00″N 119°42′30″W
- Area: 480 acres (190 ha)
- Created: 1969
- Operator: Washoe County

Hidden Valley Regional Park is a county park in southeast Reno, Nevada. It covers 480 acres (190 ha), including 65 acres (26 ha) of developed land. The rest of the park has open land and trails.

== History ==
The federal government transferred the park land to Washoe County in three patents under the Recreation and Public Purposes Act. The first covered 260 acres in 1966, followed by 200 acres in 1968 and 40 acres in 1969. The 1966 patent kept the mineral rights with the United States. It also said the land could return to federal ownership if the county stopped using it for its approved public purpose. Those terms still govern work in the park. In 2022, the Bureau of Land Management approved plans for a one-million-gallon tank to supply reclaimed water for park irrigation. The park opened in 1969. The horse arena bears the name of Clarence K. Bath, a Reno horseman who helped form the Nevada White Hats in the 1940s. The dog park is named for Link Piazzo, a local businessman and philanthropist.

Flash flooding damaged approximately 100 residential structures in the area in late July 2024, and the park sustained significant damage. It remained fully closed until August 8. Another flash flood occurred in late June 2026, prompting the county to issue an emergency declaration. The flooding left roughly 100,000 tons of debris. The park temporarily closed.

== Natural setting ==
The park is near the Storey County line, about six miles from downtown Reno. The 2022 master plan mapped ten plant communities. Big sagebrush shrubland covered 365.2 acres, making it the largest. Pinyon-juniper woodland covered 61.5 acres at higher elevations. Mixed salt desert scrub covered 17.9 acres, while mixed conifer woodland covered 0.6 acres in the southeast corner. The plan also identified soils and rock outcrops that may support altered andesite buckwheat and altered andesite popcorn flower, two rare plants tracked by the Nevada Division of Natural Heritage.

== Facilities ==
The Clarence K. Bath Memorial Horse Arena has a main arena, a warmup arena, an announcer's stand, and a grandstand. The park also has tennis and pickleball courts, a volleyball court, two playgrounds, picnic areas, and more than five miles of trails. The fenced Link Piazzo Dog Park has separate areas for large and small dogs.

Gravel roads and soft-surface trails cross the park. The trails are used mainly by hikers and mountain bikers and are also open to horseback riders. Vaughan Middle School has hosted races at the park, and an astronomy club uses accessible parts of the park for telescope viewing. Trails connect the northern and southern parts, but no road joins the two areas.
