= Pyramid, Nevada =

- Unincorporated community
- Location within Nevada
- Coordinates: 40°04′30″N 119°42′07″W
- Country: United States
- State: Nevada
- County: Washoe
- Elevation: 3,901 ft (1,189 m)
- Time zone: UTC-8 (Pacific (PST))
  - Summer (DST): UTC-7 (PDT)
- Area code: 775
- GNIS feature ID: 843007

Pyramid is an unincorporated community in Washoe County, Nevada, United States. At one time, it was a station on the Fernley and Lassen Railway located between Bristol and Big Canyon. There was a post office at this location from March 1904 until November 1959.

Pyramid is located north of Sutcliffe, Nevada and should not be confused with Pyramid City, located south of Sutcliffe.

== See also ==
- List of ghost towns in Nevada
