= Pyramid City, Nevada =

- Unincorporated community
- Location within Nevada
- Coordinates: 39°51′51″N 119°37′07″W
- Country: United States
- State: Nevada
- County: Washoe
- Elevation: 4,377 ft (1,334 m)
- Time zone: UTC-8 (Pacific (PST))
  - Summer (DST): UTC-7 (PDT)
- Area code: 775
- GNIS feature ID: 843007

Pyramid City is a ghost town located south of Sutcliffe, Nevada. The site was also sometimes referred to as Pyramid and should not be confused with Pyramid, Nevada, which lies north of Sutcliffe. The settlement comprised two mining camps: Upper Pyramid, also known as Jonesville, and Lower Pyramid, commonly called Pyramid City.

== History ==
Although silver veins had been identified in the area as early as 1860, the Pyramid district did not draw significant interest until the spring of 1876, when a Reno physician noticed an ore specimen while treating an ill miner. An assay of the sample predicted strong returns, and news of the discovery quickly spread to nearby mining camps, triggering a silver rush. Pyramid City emerged in the desert soon afterward, and a two‑stamp mill was constructed to process the ore. By the summer of 1876, Pyramid City's population had grown to nearly 300.

Of the five townships established in the district, Pyramid City became the most prominent. By March 1877, it supported two saloons, a Chinese washhouse, a store, a boarding house, and a stage line offering daily service to Reno. By the winter of that year, about sixty miners were working in the area, with only one woman residing in the camp. The settlement declined toward the end of the 1880s, and the Pyramid City post office closed in 1889. No structures remain standing at the site.

Pyramid City had a post office from February to October 1879 and again from April 1880 until February 1889.

== See also ==
- List of ghost towns in Nevada
