= Interstate 580 (Nevada) =

Highway in Nevada

Interstate 580
- I-580 highlighted in red

Route information
- Auxiliary route of I-80
- Maintained by NDOT
- Length: 35.050 mi (56.408 km)
- Existed: October 27, 1978–present
- History: 1978: Route number approved; 1964–2017: Constructed in phases; 2012: I-580 signs installed
- NHS: Entire route

Major junctions
- South end: US 50 / US 395 / US 395 Bus. in Carson City
- US 50 in Carson City
- North end: I-80 / US 395 in Reno

Location
- Country: United States
- State: Nevada
- Counties: City of Carson City, Washoe

Highway system
- Interstate Highway System; Main; Auxiliary; Suffixed; Business; Future; Nevada State Highway System; Interstate; US; State; Pre‑1976; Scenic
← SR 579	→ SR 582

Interstate 580 (I-580) is a 35.050-mile (56.408 km) auxiliary Interstate Highway in Western Nevada. It runs concurrently with US Route 395 (US 395) from an intersection with US 50 near the southern boundary of Carson City to the Reno Spaghetti Bowl interchange with I-80 in Reno. The freeway provides a high-speed direct route between Lake Tahoe and Carson City to Reno and I-80.

Construction on a freeway between Carson City and Reno was planned since 1956, but construction did not occur until 1964. The freeway opened in sections, with the final section opening on August 2, 2017. The I-580 designation was approved on October 27, 1978, but the freeway was not signed as such until the portion between Reno and Carson City was completed following the opening of the Galena Creek Bridge in late August 2012.

== Route description ==
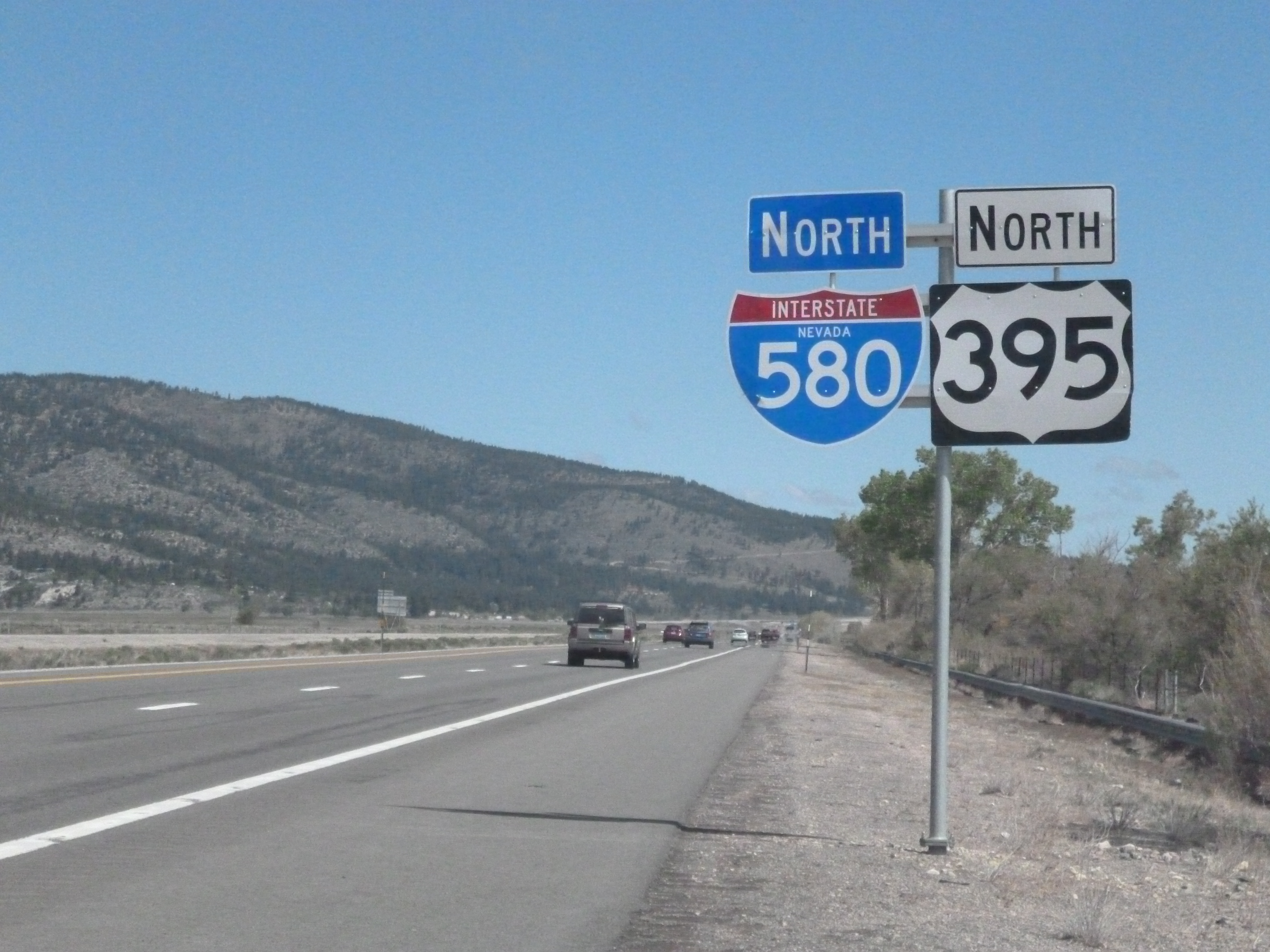
I-580 and US 395 route markers between Carson City and Reno as seen in 2014

I-580 runs from an intersection with US 50 in Carson City to an interchange with I-80 near downtown Reno. The only portion remaining to be constructed is the interchange at the freeway's southern terminus. Within Reno, the freeway is designated as the Martin Luther King Jr. Freeway. Within Carson City, the freeway is designated the Carson City Deputy Sheriff Carl Howell Memorial Freeway, in honor of a sheriff's officer who was shot to death while attempting to rescue a victim of domestic violence from her house.

The freeway begins at the junction (future single-point urban interchange) of US 395 with the Lake Tahoe leg of US 50 and follows the eastern edge of Eagle Valley, where most of the population of Carson City resides. The highway loosely follows the former alignments of Edmonds Drive and Lompa Lane along the eastern half of the city, which were relocated or truncated to make room for the freeway.

After rejoining the original alignment of US 395 at the Carson Tahoe Regional Medical Center, the highway crests Lakeview Hill to enter the Washoe Valley. The portion of I-580/US 395 and US 395 Alternate (US 395 Alt) through Washoe Valley are prone to high crosswinds, and, as such, the highways are frequently closed to high-profile vehicles. During prohibited times, trucks are rerouted to State Route 428 (SR 428/Eastlake Boulevard) and US 395 Alt, which is the old route of US 395. The high-wind area ends near the Bowers Mansion interchange near the northern end of the Washoe Valley.

Unlike the old US 395 which ran along the valley floor of Pleasant Valley, I-580 is routed in the mountains overlooking the valley and crosses the Galena Creek Bridge, the largest cathedral arch bridge in the world. Along the descent from these mountains into the Truckee Meadows and Reno, the highway cuts through the center of one of the largest geothermal powerplants in the US, Ormat Technologies's Steamboat Hills Complex power station. The freeway also passes between the clusters of Hot Springs in Steamboat Hills that provide steam for the plant.

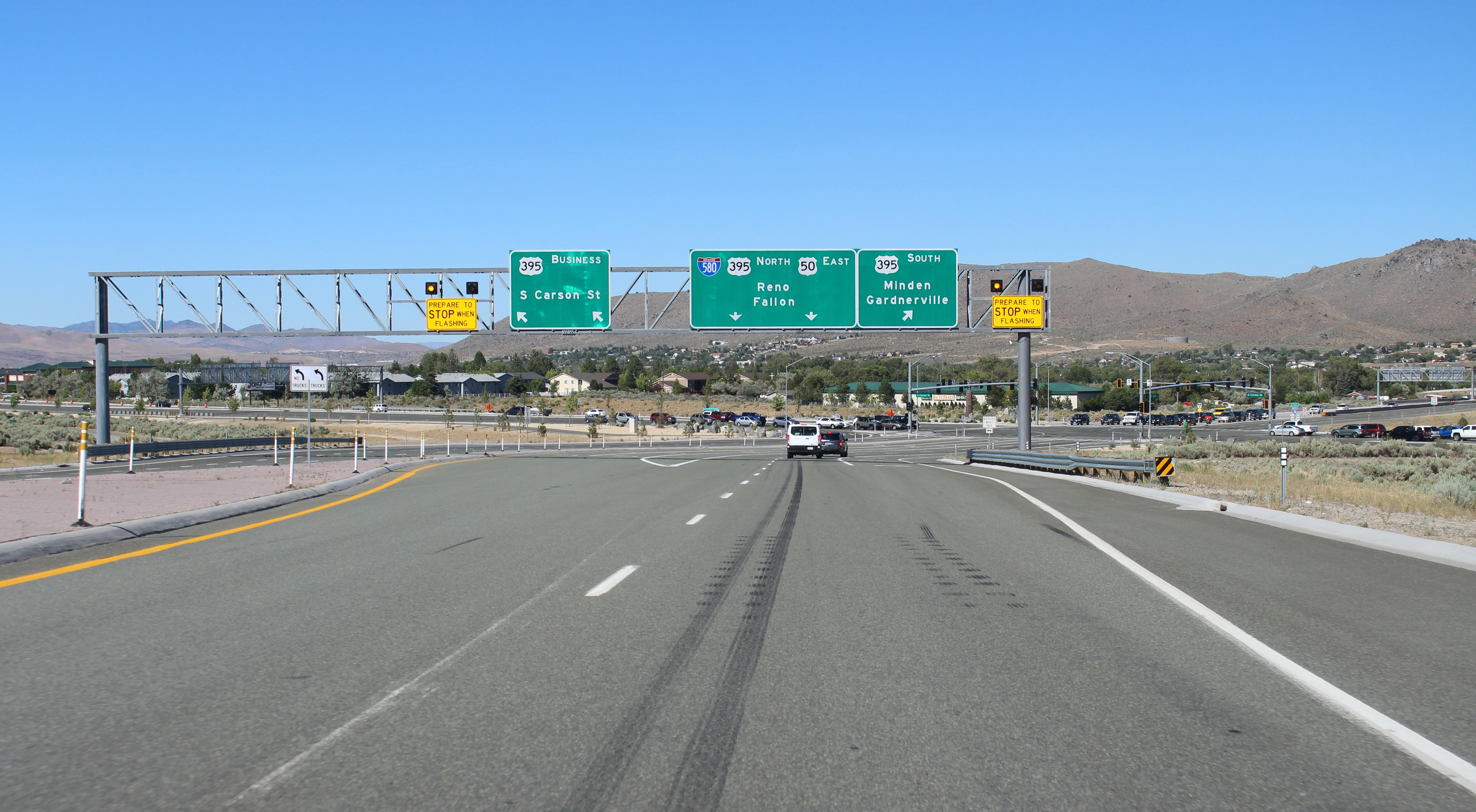
View from US 50 eastbound towards southern end of I-580 at intersection with US 395 as seen in 2020

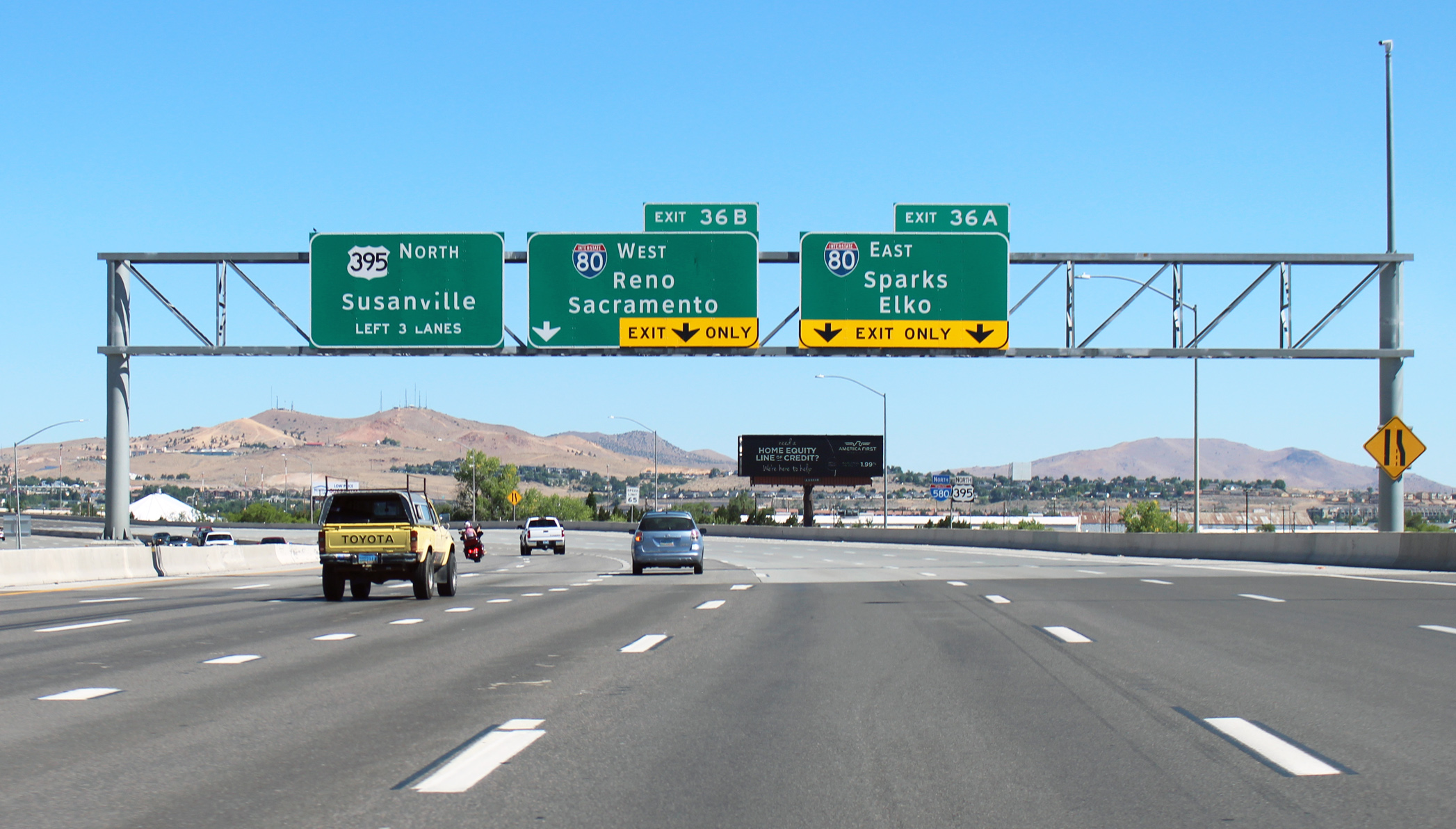
View seen by northbound traffic approaching north end of I-580 at interchange with I-80 as seen in 2020

At the extreme southern edge of Reno, the highway has a junction with the Mount Rose Highway (SR 431) and Geiger Grade (SR 341), which connect the freeway with North Lake Tahoe and Virginia City, respectively. Upon entering Reno, the freeway proceeds in a generally northern direction, crossing Virginia Street (SR 430), the old routing of US 395, several times. Along the way, the freeway passes to the side of The Summit mall, Meadowood Mall, and Reno–Tahoe International Airport. The elevated freeway also passes over a bus garage used by RTC Washoe, the local bus agency. The I-580 designation ends at the Reno Spaghetti Bowl where the highway crosses I-80; however, the freeway continues on only as US 395, heading toward the north valley neighborhoods of Sun Valley, Lemmon Valley, Stead, Cold Springs Valley, and Bordertown (parts of which are in the city of Reno) before eventually crossing the California state line.

== History ==
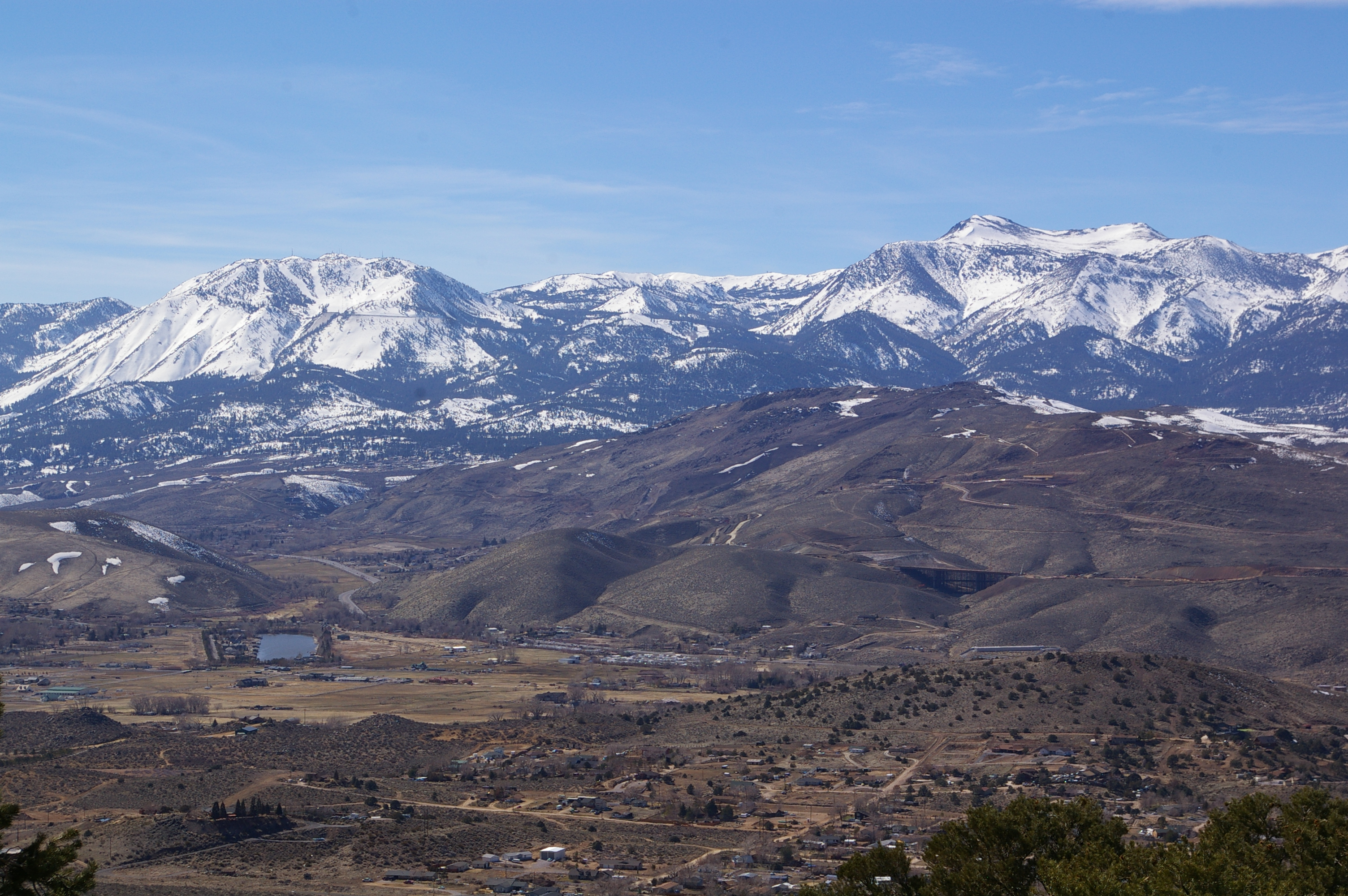
Old US 395 running through Pleasant Valley, as seen from Geiger Grade (SR 341), with the I-580 extension under construction in the mountains above as seen in 2008

Development of the I-580/US 395 freeway has been in planning since 1956, but significant construction did not occur until 1964. The freeway would be opened gradually over time and would initially be constructed in two main separate sections before 2012.

The first segment of freeway constructed along I-580 was the Washoe Valley segment, which was constructed between 1964 and 1970 between present-day Bowers Mansion Road/Carson–Reno Highway (exit 50, now exit 16) near Washoe City, south through Washoe Valley to just north of North Carson Street (exit 43, now exit 8) in Carson City.

The Reno section was constructed between 1973 and 1996. In 1973, the section running between US 395 Business (US 395 Bus; exit 72) to East Second Street/Glendale Avenue (exit 67, now exit 35) in Reno opened to traffic. This section was extended south to Mill Street (exit 66, now exit 34) in 1978, Plumb Lane/Villanova Drive (exit 65, now exit 33) in 1979, South Virginia Street/Kietzke Lane (exit 63, now exit 31) in 1981, Neil Road/Meadowood Mall Way (exit 62, now exit 30) in 1986, South Virginia Street (exit 61, now exit 29) in 1989, and Mount Rose Highway (exit 56, now exit 24) in 1996. The Carson City section was constructed in the 2000s with the construction of the Carson City Bypass project. The first phase completed the freeway from North Carson Street (exit 43, now exit 8) south to East William Street (exit 39, now exit 5) in 2006. The freeway was extended south to Fairview Drive (exit 38, now exit 3) in 2009. On August 2, 2017, the final section of the freeway between Fairview Drive (exit 38, now exit 3) and South Carson Street in Carson City opened to traffic.

In 2012, the section between Mount Rose Highway (exit 56, now exit 24) and Bowers Mansion Road/Carson–Reno Highway (exit 50, now exit 16) south of Reno opened following the opening of the Galena Creek Bridge to traffic in late August 2012, connecting the two main segments together. After the completion of this section, the freeway south of I-80 (US 395 southbound exit 68 and I-580 northbound exit 36) was signed as I-580, officially connecting Carson City to the Interstate Highway System. This left four other state capitals still not served by the Interstate Highway System: Dover, Delaware; Juneau, Alaska; Pierre, South Dakota; and Jefferson City, Missouri.

The I-580 designation was first approved by the American Association of State Highway and Transportation Officials (AASHTO) on October 27, 1978; at the time, this route extended from I-80 to US 395 (South Virginia Street, at exit 63, now exit 31). AASHTO approved the remainder of planned I-580, to the southern terminus at US 50, US 395 and US 395 Bus south of Carson City, at its December 7, 1984, meeting. Despite the route number being approved and being shown on some maps in the 1980s, I-580 was not signed along the Interstate until the freeway gap between Mount Rose Highway and Bowers Mansion Road was completed in 2012.

In October 2019, the Nevada Department of Transportation (NDOT) began replacing US 395 exit numbers with I-580 exit numbers per federal requirements on the Manual on Uniform Traffic Control Devices. It was completed in spring 2020.

The only remaining project yet to be completed as of 2025 is the South Carson Street single-point urban interchange (SPUI).

== Exit list ==
Old exits on I-580 were numbered according to US 395 mileposts.

County	Location	mi	km	Old exit	New exit	Destinations	Notes
City of Carson City; 0.00–9.43		0.000	0.000			US 50 west / US 395 south / US 395 Bus. north (S. Carson Street) – South Lake Tahoe, Minden, Gardnerville	Southern terminus; southern end of US 50/US 395 concurrency; temporary at-grade intersection; planned upgrade to SPUI interchange; S. Carson Street was formerly part of SR 529 north/US 50 east/US 395 north
City of Carson City; 0.00–9.43		2.84	4.57	38	3	Fairview Drive	Former US 50 west/US 395 south
City of Carson City; 0.00–9.43		4.57	7.35	39	5	US 50 east (E. William Street) – Dayton, Fallon	Northern end of US 50 concurrency; E. William Street was formerly part of SR 530 west/US 50 west/US 395 south
City of Carson City; 0.00–9.43		6.73	10.83	41	6	College Parkway	Former SR 531; serves Carson Airport
City of Carson City; 0.00–9.43		8.03	12.92	42	7	Arrowhead Drive	Northbound exit and southbound entrance; serves Carson Tahoe Regional Medical Center
City of Carson City; 0.00–9.43		8.46	13.62	43	8	US 395 Bus. south (N. Carson Street)	Southbound exit and northbound entrance; northern terminus of US 395 Bus.; former US 395 south; serves Carson Tahoe Regional Medical Center
Washoe; 9.43–35.187	Washoe Valley					Bowers Mansion Road / Hobart Road	Southbound entrance only; Bowers Mansion Road was formerly part of SR 429/US 395
Washoe; 9.43–35.187	Washoe Valley	9.37	15.08	44	10	Eastlake Boulevard (US 395 Alt. north)	No southbound entrance; southern terminus of US 395 Alt.; former SR 428; serves Washoe Lake State Park
Washoe; 9.43–35.187	Washoe Valley	11.20	18.02	46	12	Bellevue Road	
Washoe; 9.43–35.187	Washoe City	15.46	24.88	50	16	Old US 395 (US 395 Alt. / Bowers Mansion Road / Carson–Reno Highway) – Washoe City	Former SR 429 south/SR 430 north/US 395; serves Bowers Mansion
Washoe; 9.43–35.187		19.50	31.38	Galena Creek Bridge			
Washoe; 9.43–35.187	Reno	23.46	37.76	56	24	SR 431 (Mount Rose Highway) – North Lake Tahoe	
Washoe; 9.43–35.187	Reno	24.94	40.14	57B	25B	S. Virginia Street south (US 395 Alt. south) – Virginia City, Washoe City	Southbound exit and northbound entrance; former SR 430 south/US 395 south
Washoe; 9.43–35.187	Reno	25.40	40.88	57A	25A	S. Virginia Street north (US 395 Alt. north / US 395 Bus. north)	Southbound exit and northbound entrance; former SR 430 north/US 395 north
Washoe; 9.43–35.187	Reno	25.58	41.17	59	26	Damonte Ranch Parkway	
Washoe; 9.43–35.187	Reno	26.89	43.28	60	28	South Meadows Parkway (SR 426 west)	Eastern terminus of SR 426; serves Renown South Meadows Medical Center
Washoe; 9.43–35.187	Reno	27.98	45.03	61	29	S. Virginia Street (US 395 Alt. / US 395 Bus.)	No northbound exit to S. Virginia Street south; former SR 430/US 395; serves Northern Nevada Sierra Medical Center
Washoe; 9.43–35.187	Reno	30.19	48.59	62	30	Neil Road / Meadowood Mall Way	Neil Road was formerly part of SR 667 and the former name of Del Monte Lane; serves Northern Nevada Sierra Medical Center
Washoe; 9.43–35.187	Reno	30.97	49.84	63	31	S. Virginia Street (US 395 Bus.) / Kietzke Lane	Southbound exit and northbound entrance; S. Virginia Street was formerly part of SR 430/US 395; Kietzke Lane was formerly part of SR 667
Washoe; 9.43–35.187	Reno	32.03	51.55	64	32	Moana Lane	Diverging diamond interchange; serves Reno-Sparks Convention Center
Washoe; 9.43–35.187	Reno	32.95	53.03	65	33	Plumb Lane (SR 653) / Villanova Drive / Reno–Tahoe International Airport	Signed as exits 33A (Villanova Drive / Plumb Lane) and 33B (airport) southbound
Washoe; 9.43–35.187	Reno	33.93	54.61	66	34	Mill Street	Serves Renown Regional Medical Center and VA Sierra Nevada Health Care System
Washoe; 9.43–35.187	Reno	34.46	55.46	67	35	E. Second Street / Glendale Avenue (SR 648)	
Washoe; 9.43–35.187	Reno	35.050	56.408	68	36	I-80 – Elko, Salt Lake City, Reno, Sacramento	Signed as exits 36A (east) and 36B (west) northbound; I-80 exit 15
Washoe; 9.43–35.187	Reno	35.050	56.408			US 395 north – Susanville	Northern terminus; northern end of US 395 concurrency
1.000 mi = 1.609 km; 1.000 km = 0.621 mi: Concurrency terminus; Incomplete access
