= Washoe County, Nevada =

County in Nevada, United States

- County
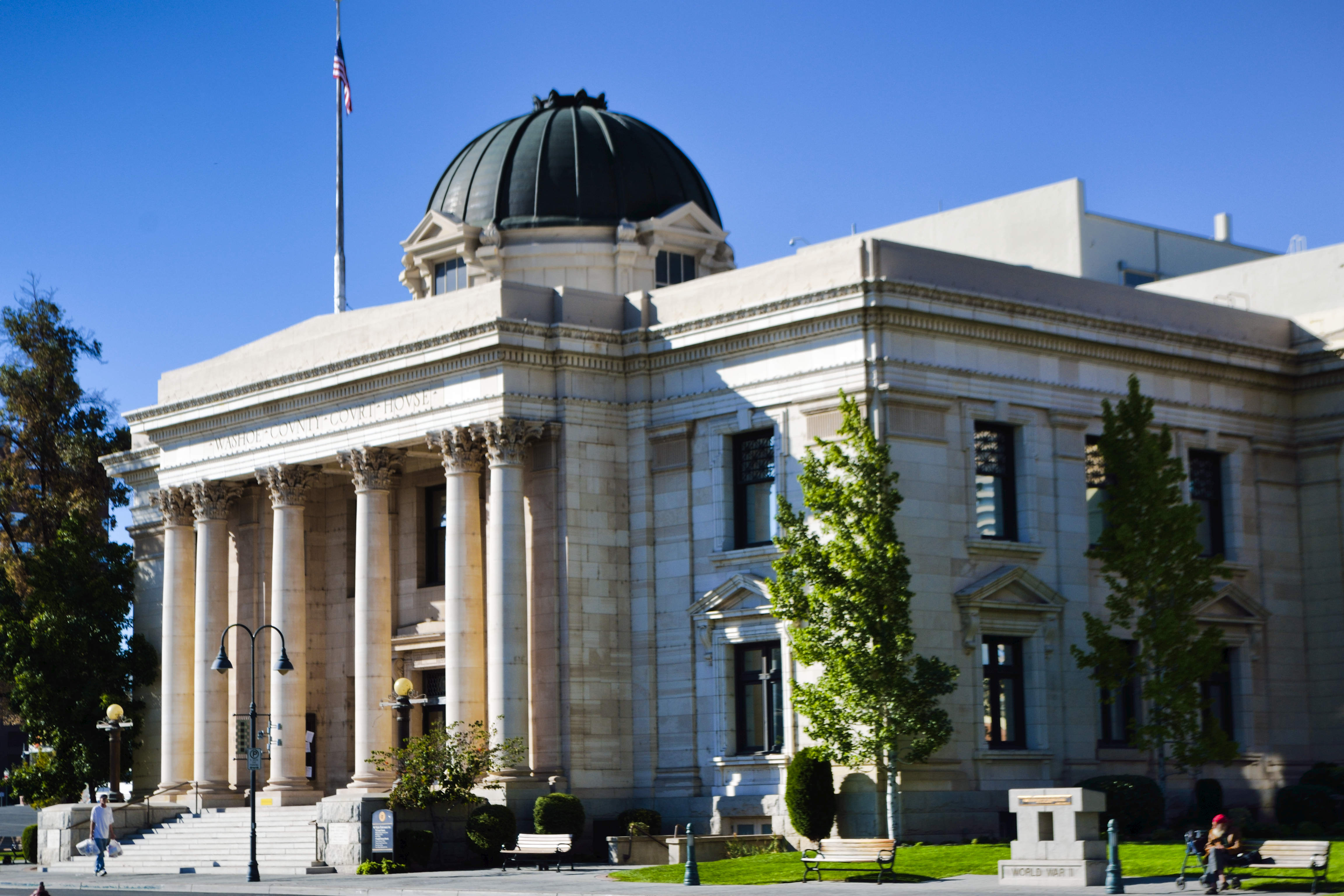
- Washoe County Courthouse

- Flag Seal

- Location within the U.S. state of Nevada
- Coordinates: 40°38′N 119°41′W
- Country: United States
- State: Nevada
- Founded: November 25, 1861; 164 years ago
- Named for: Washoe people
- Seat: Reno
- Largest city: Reno

Area
  - Total: 6,542 sq mi (16,940 km^{2})
  - Land: 6,302 sq mi (16,320 km^{2})
  - Water: 240 sq mi (620 km^{2}) 3.7%

Population (2020)
  - Total: 486,492
  - Estimate (2025): 509,386 ▲
  - Density: 77.20/sq mi (29.81/km^{2})
- Time zone: UTC−8 (Pacific)
  - Summer (DST): UTC−7 (PDT)
- Congressional district: 2nd
- Website: washoecounty.gov

Washoe County (/ˈwɒʃoʊ/) is a county in the U.S. state of Nevada. As of the 2020 census, the population was 486,492, making it Nevada's second-most populous county. Its county seat is Reno. Washoe County is included in the Reno, NV Metropolitan Statistical Area.

The Washoe County landing ship tank was named after this county.

== History ==
Petroglyphs on the west side of the Winnemucca Lake basin are at least 10,500 years old and may be 14,800 years old. They are the oldest known petroglyphs in North America.

Trappers and explorers, along with several emigrant trails to California and Oregon went through Washoe County in the 1840s. In January 1844, Lieutenant John C. Frémont discovered and named Pyramid Lake, with the expedition going down to the Truckee River soon after. Later that year, the Stephens-Donner route opened, the route crossing the Humboldt Sink to the Truckee River and went over the Truckee Pass.

Migration to California attracted settlers to the Truckee Meadows, and just south of the Truckee River, the Junction House was established in 1850.

On September 9, 1850, Congress created Utah Territory, which included Nevada and Washoe County.

Washoe County was created on November 25, 1861, as one of the original nine counties of the Nevada Territory. It is named after the Washoe people who originally inhabited the area. It was consolidated with Roop County in 1864. Washoe City was the first county seat in 1861 and was replaced by Reno in 1871.

In 1911, a small band of Shoshone and Bannock led by Mike Daggett killed four stockmen in Washoe County. A posse was formed, and on February 26, 1911, at the Battle of Kelley Creek, eight of Daggett's band were killed, along with one member of the posse, Ed Hogle. Three children and a woman who survived the battle were captured. The remains of some of the members of the band were repatriated from the Smithsonian Institution to the Fort Hall Idaho Shoshone-Bannock Tribe in 1994.

In 1918, Washoe County elected the first woman elected to the Nevada Legislature, Sadie Hurst, a Republican.

As of 2013, "Washoe County is the first school district in the state to offer Paiute classes," offering an elective course in the Paiute language at Spanish Springs High School and North Valleys High School.

== Geography ==
According to the U.S. Census Bureau, the county has a total area of 6,542 square miles (16,940 km^{2}), of which 6,302 square miles (16,320 km^{2}) is land and 240 square miles (620 km^{2}) (3.7%) is water. The highest point in Washoe County is Mount Rose at 10,785 ft (3,287 m), while the most topographically prominent peak is Virginia Peak.

The Massacre Rim Wilderness Study Area in northern Washoe County became an International Dark Sky Sanctuary in 2019. DarkSky International says it is one of the darkest places in the contiguous United States.

The endangered cui-ui is found only in Pyramid Lake and the lower Truckee River. It is a traditional food of the Pyramid Lake Paiute Tribe, whose traditional name means "cui-ui eaters".

There are two incorporated cities within the county, namely Reno and Sparks. In 2010, there was a ballot question asking whether the Reno city government and the Washoe County government should become one combined governmental body. According to unofficial results the day after the election, 54% of voters approved of the ballot measure to consolidate the governments.

The Truckee Meadows of Washoe County starts at the furthest southern runway of Reno Tahoe International Airport, GPS Coordinates 39.468836,-119.770912 and runs south east. Rattle Snake Mountain at Huffaker Park, follows the span of Steamboat Creek to the southern east end of Washoe County. This is the last of the range/prairie and wild grass water shed from the eastern range of the Reno Tahoe basin.

Washoe County is a wildfire prone area. These risks are particularly in Southern Reno (or areas just outside the city limits). As many structures are now being built in forested areas, along with often having favorable fire weather, most residents are under severe fire danger. Many fires in Southwest Reno have been destructive or spread quickly, such as the Caughlin Fire in 2011.

=== Adjacent counties ===
- Lake County, Oregon – north
- Harney County, Oregon – northeast
- Humboldt County, Nevada – east
- Pershing County, Nevada – east
- Churchill County, Nevada – east
- Lyon County, Nevada – southeast
- Storey County, Nevada – south
- Carson City, Nevada – south
- Placer County, California – southwest
- Nevada County, California – west
- Sierra County, California – west
- Lassen County, California – west
- Modoc County, California – west

=== Major highways ===
- I-80
  - I-80 BL / SR 425 (Verdi)
  - I-80 BL / SR 647 (Reno–Sparks)
  - I-80 BL / SR 427 (Wadsworth)
- I-580
- US 395
  - US 395 Bus. / SR 430 (Reno)
- SR 28
- SR 341
- SR 425
- SR 426
- SR 427
- SR 430
- SR 431
- SR 439
- SR 443
- SR 445
- SR 446
- SR 447 / CR 447
- SR 647
- SR 648
- SR 653
- SR 655
- SR 659
- SR 667
- SR 668
- SR 671
- SR 673
- SR 877
- SR 878
- SR 880

=== National protected areas ===
- Anaho Island National Wildlife Refuge
- Black Rock Desert-High Rock Canyon Emigrant Trails National Conservation Area (part)
- Sheldon National Wildlife Refuge (part)
- Toiyabe National Forest (part)

== Parks and recreation ==
Washoe County's largest park is Rancho San Rafael Regional Park in Reno. The 580-acre park hosts The Great Reno Balloon Race and includes the Wilbur D. May Museum and Arboretum.

Hidden Valley Regional Park covers 480 acres in southeast Reno. Sixty-five acres are developed. The park has an equestrian arena, trails, and a fenced dog park. Galena Creek Regional Park is on the east slope of the Sierra Nevada. Its trails are used for hiking in summer and cross-country skiing and snowshoeing in winter. About 20 miles south of Reno, Bowers Mansion Regional Park includes the historic Bowers Mansion and a seasonal outdoor pool.

== Demographics ==
Historical population
Census	Pop.	Note	%±
1870	3,091		—
1880	5,664		83.2%
1890	6,437		13.6%
1900	9,141		42.0%
1910	17,434		90.7%
1920	18,627		6.8%
1930	27,158		45.8%
1940	32,476		19.6%
1950	50,205		54.6%
1960	84,743		68.8%
1970	121,068		42.9%
1980	193,623		59.9%
1990	254,667		31.5%
2000	339,486		33.3%
2010	421,407		24.1%
2020	486,492		15.4%
2025 (est.)	509,386	▲	4.7%
U.S. Decennial Census; 1790–1960 1900–1990; 1990–2000 2010–2020

=== Racial and ethnic composition ===
Washoe County, Nevada – Racial and ethnic composition Note: the US Census treats Hispanic/Latino as an ethnic category. This table excludes Latinos from the racial categories and assigns them to a separate category. Hispanics/Latinos may be of any race.
Race / Ethnicity (NH = Non-Hispanic)	Pop 1980	Pop 1990	Pop 2000	Pop 2010	Pop 2020	% 1980	% 1990	% 2000	% 2010	% 2020
White alone (NH)	173,030	212,416	247,835	278,213	287,862	89.36%	83.41%	73.00%	66.02%	59.17%
Black or African American alone (NH)	3,497	5,414	6,734	9,088	11,527	1.81%	2.13%	1.98%	2.16%	2.37%
Native American or Alaska Native alone (NH)	3,410	4,380	5,181	5,782	5,790	1.76%	1.72%	1.53%	1.37%	1.19%
Asian alone (NH)	3,803	9,270	14,306	21,288	28,063	1.96%	3.64%	4.21%	5.05%	5.77%
Native Hawaiian or Pacific Islander alone (NH)	x	x	1,493	2,358	3,250	x	x	0.44%	0.56%	0.67%
Other race alone (NH)	531	228	432	673	2,485	0.27%	0.09%	0.13%	0.16%	0.51%
Mixed race or Multiracial (NH)	x	x	7,204	10,281	25,311	x	x	2.12%	2.44%	5.20%
Hispanic or Latino (any race)	9,352	22,959	56,301	93,724	122,204	4.83%	9.02%	16.58%	22.24%	25.12%
Total	193,623	254,667	339,486	421,407	486,492	100.00%	100.00%	100.00%	100.00%	100.00%

=== 2020 census ===
As of the 2020 census, the county had a population of 486,492. The median age was 38.4 years. 21.1% of residents were under the age of 18 and 17.3% of residents were 65 years of age or older. For every 100 females there were 102.2 males, and for every 100 females age 18 and over there were 101.0 males age 18 and over. 95.8% of residents lived in urban areas, while 4.2% lived in rural areas.

The racial makeup of the county was 64.1% White, 2.5% Black or African American, 1.9% American Indian and Alaska Native, 5.9% Asian, 0.7% Native Hawaiian and Pacific Islander, 11.9% from some other race, and 13.0% from two or more races. Hispanic or Latino residents of any race comprised 25.1% of the population.

There were 191,885 households in the county, of which 28.5% had children under the age of 18 living with them and 24.8% had a female householder with no spouse or partner present. About 27.7% of all households were made up of individuals and 11.2% had someone living alone who was 65 years of age or older.

There were 207,209 housing units, of which 7.4% were vacant. Among occupied housing units, 57.8% were owner-occupied and 42.2% were renter-occupied. The homeowner vacancy rate was 1.2% and the rental vacancy rate was 6.9%.

=== 2010 census ===
As of the 2010 United States census, there were 421,407 people, 163,445 households, and 102,768 families living in the county. The population density was 66.9 inhabitants per square mile (25.8/km^{2}). There were 184,841 housing units at an average density of 29.3 per square mile (11.3/km^{2}). The racial makeup of the county was 76.9% white, 5.2% Asian, 2.3% black or African American, 1.7% American Indian, 0.6% Pacific islander, 9.5% from other races, and 3.8% from two or more races. Those of Hispanic or Latino origin made up 22.2% of the population. In terms of ancestry, 16.9% were German, 13.1% were Irish, 11.8% were English, 7.2% were Italian, and 4.7% were American.

Of the 163,445 households, 32.0% had children under the age of 18 living with them, 45.6% were married couples living together, 11.3% had a female householder with no husband present, 37.1% were non-families, and 27.2% of all households were made up of individuals. The average household size was 2.55 and the average family size was 3.11. The median age was 37.0 years.

The median income for a household in the county was $55,658 and the median income for a family was $67,428. Males had a median income of $46,653 versus $35,559 for females. The per capita income for the county was $29,687. About 8.5% of families and 12.6% of the population were below the poverty line, including 17.0% of those under age 18 and 6.4% of those age 65 or over.

=== 2000 census ===
As of the census of 2000, there were 339,486 people, 132,084 households, and 83,741 families living in the county. The population density was 54 people per square mile (21 people/km^{2}). There were 143,908 housing units at an average density of 23 per square mile (8.9/km^{2}). The racial makeup of the county was 80.4% White, 2.1% Black or African American, 1.8% Native American, 4.3% Asian, 0.5% Pacific Islander, 7.7% from other races, and 3.3% from two or more races. 16.6% of the population were Hispanic or Latino of any race.

There were 132,084 households, out of which 31.1% had children under the age of 18 living with them, 47.9% were married couples living together, 10.30% had a female householder with no husband present, and 36.60% were non-families. 27.0% of all households were made up of individuals, and 7.7% had someone living alone who was 65 years of age or older. The average household size was 2.53 and the average family size was 3.09.

In the county, the population was spread out, with 24.9% under the age of 18, 9.8% from 18 to 24, 31.0% from 25 to 44, 23.8% from 45 to 64, and 10.5% who were 65 years of age or older. The median age was 36 years. For every 100 females, there were 102.8 males. For every 100 females age 18 and over, there were 101.8 males.

The median income for a household in the county was $45,815, and the median income for a family was $54,283. Males had a median income of $36,226 versus $27,953 for females. The per capita income for the county was $24,277. About 6.7% of families and 10.0% of the population were below the poverty line, including 12.2% of those under age 18 and 6.2% of those age 65 or over.

=== 2016 ===
The Demographics of Washoe County covers 6,540.4 square miles. There are approximately 42,154 households in the unincorporated areas with an estimated population of 419,948. The average household size in 2007 was estimated at 2.70. The Truckee Meadows Fire Protection District is charged with fire protection and emergency services in the unincorporated areas of the county.

== Economy ==
Between 2020 and 2025, the number of jobs in Washoe County rose 13.1 percent, compared with 10.6 percent nationally.

Outside Reno and Sparks, the county has several distinct local economies. More than 40 percent of jobs across the Lake Tahoe Basin were related to tourism in 2013. Ridgeline, which makes software for investment management firms, describes the Lake Tahoe area as its headquarters and lists an office in Incline Village. The company raised $250 million at a $1.4 billion valuation in 2026.

== Politics ==
United States presidential election results for Washoe County, Nevada
Year	Republican		Democratic		Third party(ies)	
Year	No.	%	No.	%	No.	%
1880	755	47.69%	828	52.31%	0	0.00%
1884	716	59.22%	493	40.78%	0	0.00%
1888	902	57.42%	655	41.69%	14	0.89%
1892	530	32.56%	235	14.43%	863	53.01%
1896	513	33.68%	1,010	66.32%	0	0.00%
1900	919	47.77%	1,005	52.23%	0	0.00%
1904	1,517	59.44%	721	28.25%	314	12.30%
1908	2,053	50.01%	1,745	42.51%	307	7.48%
1912	644	17.88%	1,446	40.14%	1,512	41.98%
1916	3,225	45.44%	3,341	47.07%	532	7.50%
1920	4,189	61.02%	2,357	34.33%	319	4.65%
1924	3,549	45.70%	1,669	21.49%	2,548	32.81%
1928	5,767	59.34%	3,952	40.66%	0	0.00%
1932	4,333	34.74%	8,141	65.26%	0	0.00%
1936	4,358	31.42%	9,514	68.58%	0	0.00%
1940	8,062	46.59%	9,243	53.41%	0	0.00%
1944	9,024	51.84%	8,384	48.16%	0	0.00%
1948	11,323	56.09%	8,365	41.44%	500	2.48%
1952	19,044	68.18%	8,888	31.82%	0	0.00%
1956	18,865	66.45%	9,525	33.55%	0	0.00%
1960	18,833	55.21%	15,280	44.79%	0	0.00%
1964	18,350	47.64%	20,170	52.36%	0	0.00%
1968	23,492	54.65%	14,560	33.87%	4,936	11.48%
1972	33,539	66.22%	17,106	33.78%	0	0.00%
1976	29,264	54.98%	21,687	40.74%	2,276	4.28%
1980	41,276	63.54%	15,621	24.05%	8,059	12.41%
1984	50,418	67.67%	22,321	29.96%	1,772	2.38%
1988	52,654	59.34%	32,902	37.08%	3,172	3.57%
1992	42,636	37.18%	39,500	34.45%	32,535	28.37%
1996	49,477	45.28%	44,915	41.11%	14,874	13.61%
2000	63,640	52.04%	52,097	42.60%	6,564	5.37%
2004	81,545	51.26%	74,841	47.05%	2,693	1.69%
2008	76,880	42.61%	99,671	55.25%	3,863	2.14%
2012	88,453	47.09%	95,409	50.79%	3,993	2.13%
2016	94,758	45.14%	97,379	46.39%	17,772	8.47%
2020	116,760	46.31%	128,128	50.82%	7,254	2.88%
2024	127,443	48.32%	130,071	49.32%	6,220	2.36%

United States Senate election results for Washoe County, Nevada1
Year	Republican		Democratic		Third party(ies)	
Year	No.	%	No.	%	No.	%
2024	115,713	44.25%	130,841	50.04%	14,921	5.71%

Washoe County was rather conservative for an urban county for much of the late twentieth century. It voted for the Republican candidate all but once between 1944 and 2004 (in the 1964 Democratic landslide). However, starting in the 1990s, it became more competitive, going from a 22-point win for George H. W. Bush in 1988 to only a three-point win for Bush in 1992. From 1996 to 2004, the Republican candidate tallied a margin greater than four points only once, in 2000. The county swung hard to Barack Obama in 2008, going from a four-point margin for George W. Bush in 2004 to a 12-point margin for Obama in 2008. Since then, it has always voted Democratic in presidential elections, albeit by relatively narrow margins consistently under 5%. In 2016 and 2024, Donald Trump lost the county even as he won the presidency, the first time in 124 years that a Republican won the White House without winning Washoe County.

While Washoe is now more of a swing county federally, it remains very Republican down ballot. Republicans still hold the majority of the county's seats in the state legislature. Democratic strength is concentrated in Reno and Sparks, while the rest of the county remains powerfully Republican.

The county is governed by an elected five-member Board of County Commissioners and an appointed county manager. The commissioners serve staggered four-year terms - three are elected during midterm elections and two during presidential elections.

Washoe County Board of County Commissioners
District	Commissioner	Party	First elected	Last elected	Notes
1	Alexis Hill	Democratic	2020	2024	Chair
2	Michael Clark	Republican	2022	2022	
3	Mariluz Garcia	Democratic	2022	2022	
4	Clara Andriola	Republican	2023^{1)}	2024	
5	Jeanne Herman	Republican	2014	2022	Vice-chair

^{1)} Appointed by Governor Joe Lombardo.

Nevada Senate districts

- 13th (central Reno and Sparks)
- 14th (northern Washoe County)
- 15th (Cold Springs, Mogul, Verdi)
- 16th (Incline Village, Washoe Valley)

== Communities ==
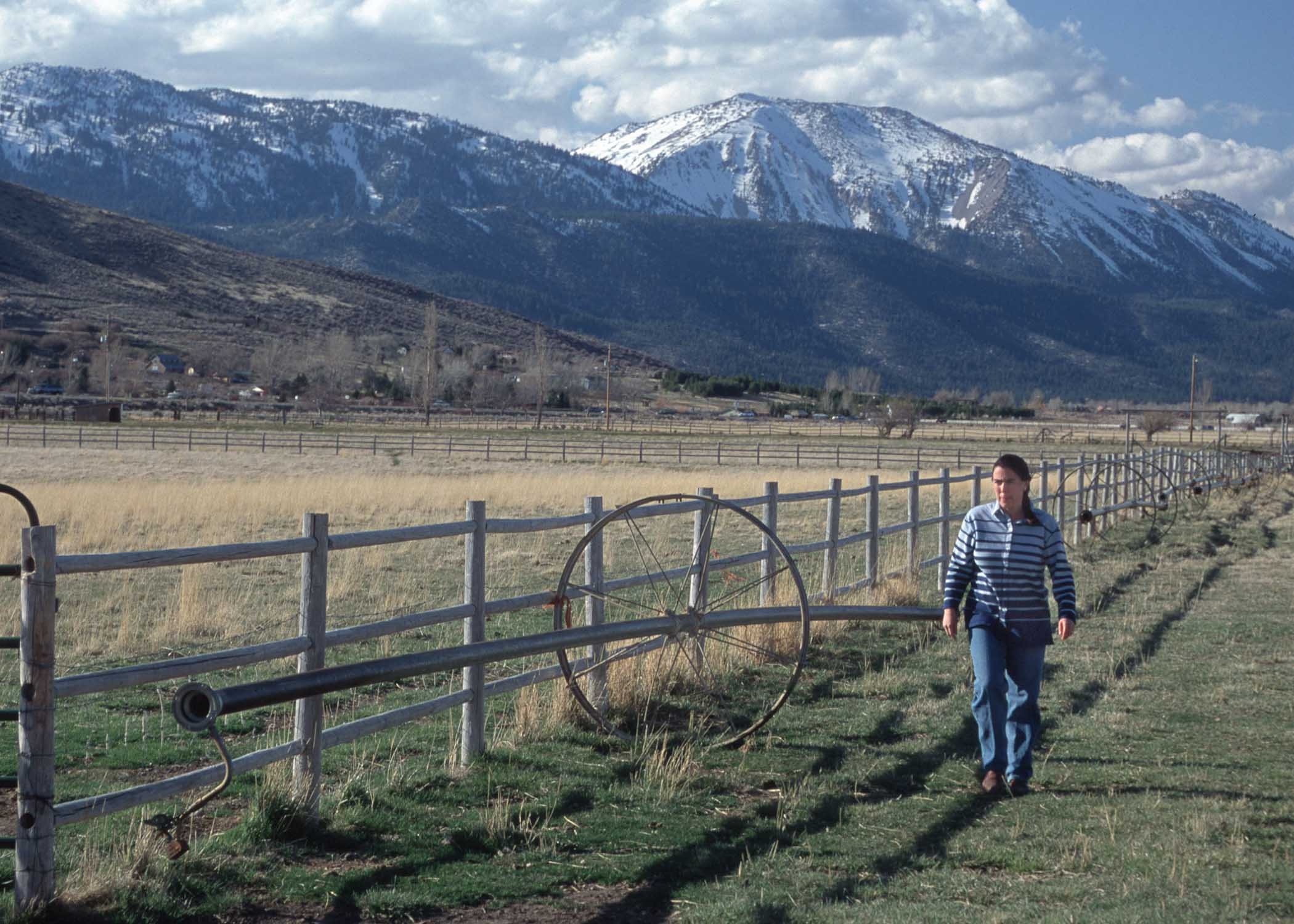
Ranching in Washoe County

=== Cities ===
- Reno (county seat)
- Sparks

=== Census-designated places ===
- Cold Springs
- Crystal Bay
- Empire
- Gerlach
- Golden Valley
- Incline Village
- Lemmon Valley
- Mogul
- Nixon
- Spanish Springs
- Sun Valley
- Sutcliffe
- Verdi
- Wadsworth
- Washoe Valley

=== Other unincorporated communities and ghost towns ===
- Deep Hole
- Flanigan
- Galena
- New Washoe City
- Poeville
- Pleasant Valley
- Pyramid
- Pyramid City
- Steamboat Springs
- Vya
- Washoe City

== Education ==
Washoe County School District is the school district for the entire county.

The Bureau of Indian Education-contracted Pyramid Lake Schools is in Nixon.

There is a charter school, Coral Academy of Science; and these private schools: Bishop Manogue High School and Excel Christian School.

University of Nevada, Reno is in Reno.

Washoe County Library System is the public library system.

== Notable residents ==
- Nellie Shaw Harnar, historian and educator
- Jeremy Renner, actor best known for his role as Hawkeye in the Marvel Cinematic Universe franchise

== See also ==
- National Register of Historic Places listings in Washoe County, Nevada
- Reno 911!, a parody cop show set in Washoe County
- Washoe Zephyr, a regional wind referenced by Mark Twain.
