= Nevada State Route 647 =

Highway in Nevada

State Route 647
- W. Fourth Street / Prater Way / Victorian Avenue
- SR 647 highlighted in red

Route information
- Maintained by NDOT
- Length: 3.397 mi (5.467 km)
- Existed: July 1, 1976–present

Major junctions
- West end: I-80 in Reno
- East end: I-80 in Sparks

Location
- Country: United States
- State: Nevada
- County: Washoe

Highway system
- Interstate Highway System; Main; Auxiliary; Suffixed; Business; Future; Nevada State Highway System; Interstate; US; State; Pre‑1976; Scenic
← SR 613	→ SR 648

State Route 647 (SR 647) is a state highway in Washoe County, Nevada. The route currently comprises a portion of West Fourth Street in Reno and a short segment of Prater Way in Sparks. The route previously extended a greater distance east–west through Reno–Sparks and was formerly designated as part of U.S. Route 40.

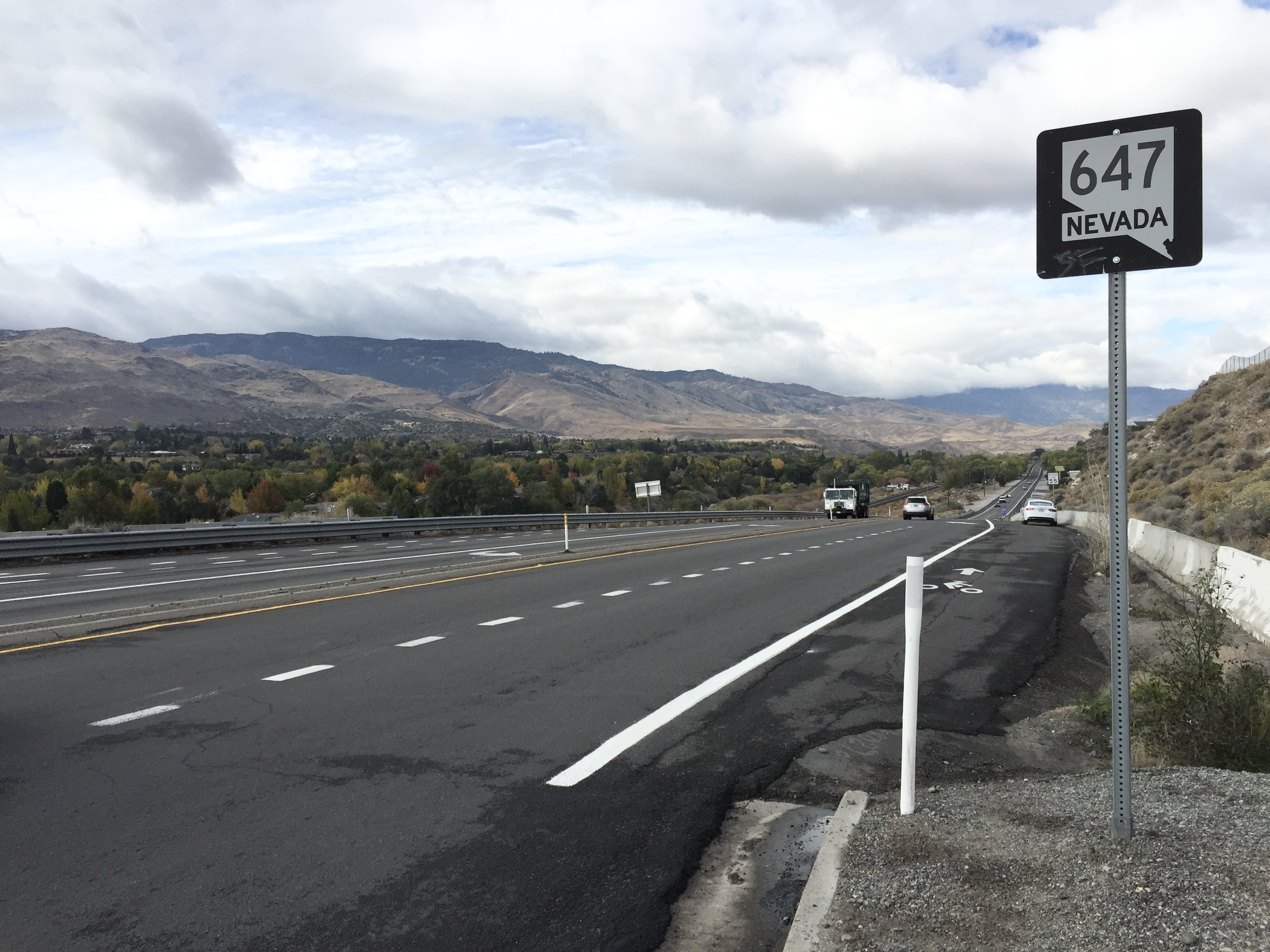
View west along SR 647 as seen in 2015

== Major intersections ==
The entire route is in Washoe County.

Location	mi	km	Destinations	Notes
Reno	0.000	0.000	I-80 west – Sacramento	Western terminus; I-80 exit 8
Reno			McCarran Boulevard (SR 659)	Former SR 651
Reno	Gap in route			
Reno–Sparks line			Galletti Way	
Sparks	3.397	5.467	I-80 – Reno, Elko	Eastern terminus; I-80 exit 16
1.000 mi = 1.609 km; 1.000 km = 0.621 mi
