= U.S. Route 395 in Nevada =

Section of U.S. Highway in western Nevada, United States

U.S. Route 395
- US 395 highlighted in red

Route information
- Auxiliary route of US 95
- Maintained by NDOT
- Length: 85.627 mi (137.803 km)
- Existed: 1934–present

Major junctions
- South end: US 395 at the California state line in Topaz Lake
- I-580 / US 50 / US 395 Bus. in Carson City; I-80 in Reno
- North end: US 395 at the California state line near Hallelujah Junction

Location
- Country: United States
- State: Nevada
- Counties: Douglas, City of Carson City, Washoe

Highway system
- United States Numbered Highway System; List; Special; Divided; Nevada State Highway System; Interstate; US; State; Pre‑1976; Scenic
← SR 379	→ SR 396

U.S. Route 395 (US 395) is an 85-mile-long (137 km) United States Numbered Highway near Lake Tahoe in the state of Nevada. It traverses the state after entering from California in Topaz Lake and crosses back into California near Hallelujah Junction. US 395 serves the cities of Gardnerville, Minden, Carson City and Reno. All of US 395 north of Carson City is a freeway and is built up to Interstate Highway standards. Part of the freeway section is also designated as Interstate 580 (I-580). US 395 is an important regional highway, serving the communities of Western Nevada, connecting them to other major communities via California, and it is the only major north–south arterial for the geographically isolated region.

== Route description ==
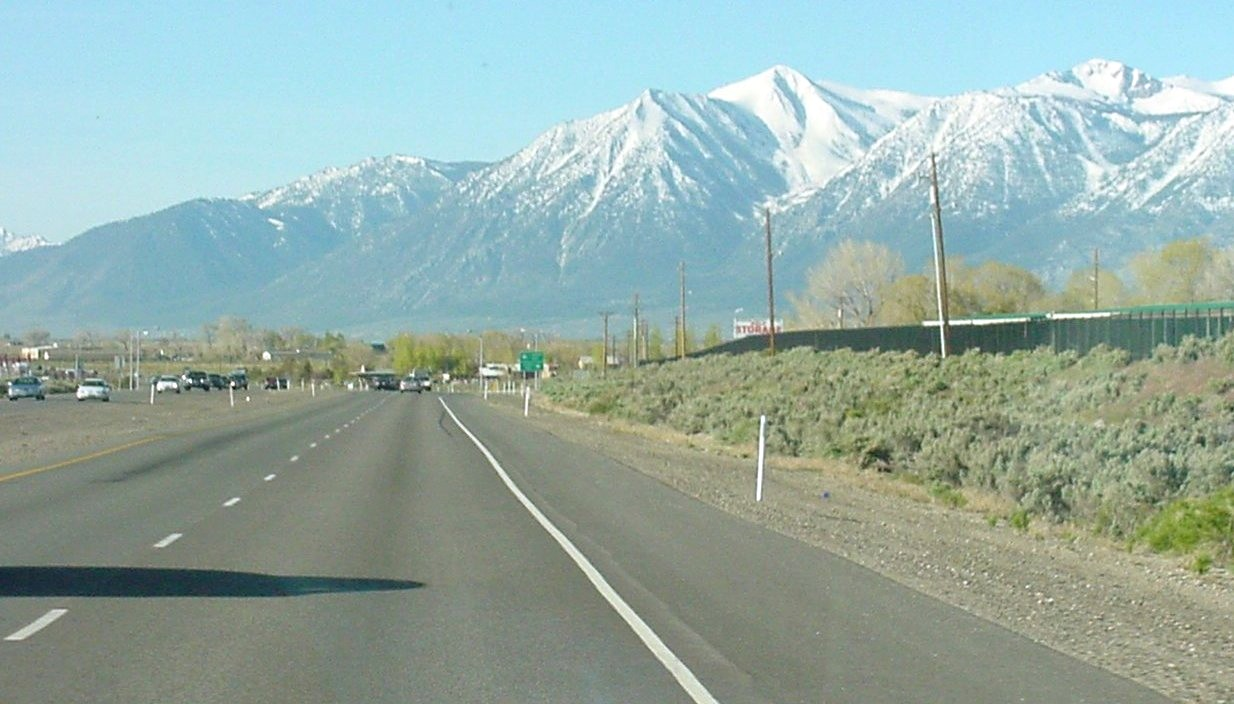
Southbound US 395 in Douglas County, about 3 miles (4.8 km) south of the I-580/US 50 intersection in Carson City as seen in 2005

US 395 enters Nevada in Topaz Lake as a two-lane highway and gradually winds its way to Carson Valley where it becomes the principal thoroughfare for the Gardnerville–Minden area. Upon entering the Carson Valley, US 395 becomes a four-lane highway through Gardnerville and Minden. Upon leaving Minden, the highway becomes a four-lane divided highway and turns due north towards Carson City.

At the south end of Carson City, the route intersects the southern terminus of I-580 and US 50. The three routes then continue on a freeway bypass around the east side of Carson City. US 50 departs from the freeway at East William Street, while I-580 and US 395 continue north through Carson City.

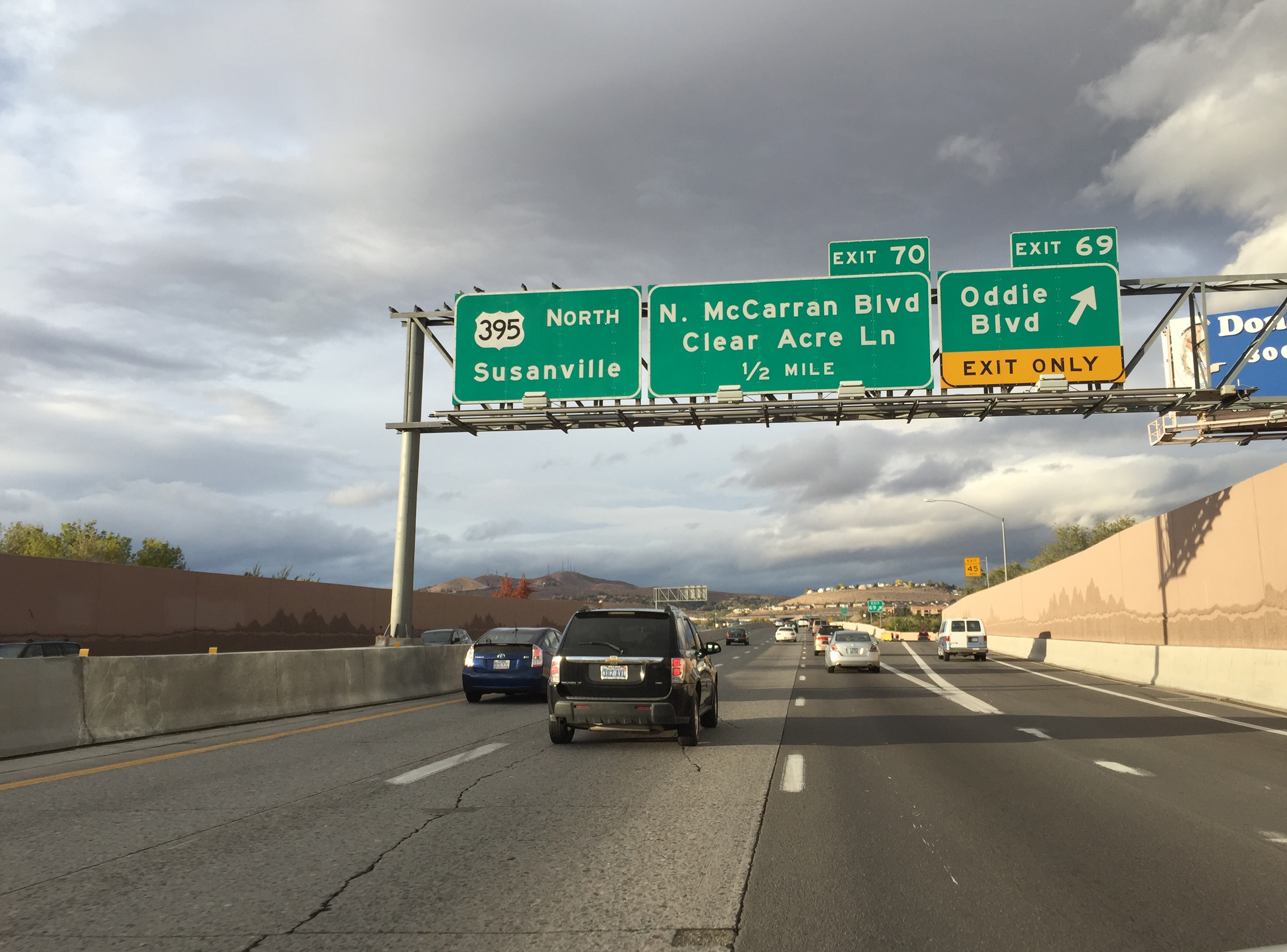
View north along US 395 in Reno, just north of I-80 as seen in 2015

Upon exiting Carson City, the freeway continues north through Washoe Valley and passes through the mountains west of Washoe City and Pleasant Valley before entering Reno. Upon entering Reno, the route is designated, since 1998, as the Martin Luther King Jr. Freeway. The freeway heads north to the I-80 interchange near Downtown Reno and I-580 ends here. Shortly afterward, US 395 turns northwest to serve the northern valleys of the Reno area before crossing back to California at the unincorporated Nevada community of Bordertown, in Cold Springs, Washoe County.

The entire route of US 395 through Nevada closely follows the eastern edge of the Sierra Nevada range. Several prominent peaks are visible from the highway, including Jobs Peak and Mount Rose.

== History ==
Per Nevada Historical Marker number 124, located along the route near Minden, this portion of US 395 was originally built as a toll road called Boyd's Toll Road. The original state route designations for modern US 395 was SR 9 north of Reno, SR 3 Reno to Holbrook (at the modern junction of US 395 and SR 208) and SR 19 from there to the state line at Topaz Lake. The US 395 designation was added to the route by 1934. From the inception of the Interstate Highway system there were plans to upgrade the portion from Carson City to Reno to Interstate Highway standards, and while portions were improved, rerouted and rebuilt to a new freeway alignment starting in the 1960s, the road was not officially signed as Interstate 580 until 2012.

== Future ==
With rapid growth in Carson City and Douglas County, NDOT published a study in 2025 with various recommendations to improve capacity and safety along US 395. Some alternatives involve building intersections or roundabouts at high volume interchanges.

== Major intersections ==
Note: Mileposts in Nevada reset at county lines. The start and end mileposts for each county are given in the county column. Exits numbered according to statewide mileage.

County	Location	mi	km	Exit	Destinations	Notes
Douglas; DO 0.000–33.956	Topaz Lake	0.000	0.000		US 395 south – Bishop	Continuation into California
Douglas; DO 0.000–33.956	Holbrook Junction				SR 208 east / Highland Way – Yerington	
Douglas; DO 0.000–33.956	Gardnerville				SR 756 west (Gilman Avenue)	
Douglas; DO 0.000–33.956	Minden				SR 88 south (Woodfords Road) / Santa Anita Avenue – Woodfords	
Douglas; DO 0.000–33.956	Minden				SR 757 west (Muller Lane) / Muller Parkway	
Douglas; DO 0.000–33.956					SR 206 south (Genoa Lane) – Genoa	
Douglas; DO 0.000–33.956					SR 759 east (Airport Road) – Minden–Tahoe Airport	
City of Carson City; CC 0.000–9.822 (Note: Includes the portion concurrent with I-580)		0.531	0.855		US 50 west / US 395 Bus. north (S. Carson Street) – South Lake Tahoe I-580 begins	Proposed interchange; southern end of I-580/US 50 concurrency
See I-580
Washoe; WA 0.000–41.655	Reno			68	I-80 – Elko, Salt Lake City, Reno, Sacramento I-580 ends	Northern end of I-580 concurrency; signed as I-580 exits 36A (east) and 36B (west) northbound; I-80 exit 15
Washoe; WA 0.000–41.655	Reno			69	Oddie Boulevard	Former SR 663
Washoe; WA 0.000–41.655	Reno			70	N. McCarran Boulevard (SR 659) / Clear Acre Lane (SR 443) – Sun Valley	Signed as exits 70A (McCarran Boulevard) and 70B (Clear Acre Lane) northbound; N. McCarran Boulevard was formerly part of SR 650/SR 651
Washoe; WA 0.000–41.655	Reno			71	Dandini Boulevard / Parr Boulevard	Serves Truckee Meadows Community College and Desert Research Institute
Washoe; WA 0.000–41.655	Reno			72	US 395 Bus. south (SR 430 south to N. Virginia Street) – Reno	Northbound exit signed as "Panther Valley"
Washoe; WA 0.000–41.655	Reno			73	Golden Valley Road	
Washoe; WA 0.000–41.655	Reno			74	Lemmon Drive	
Washoe; WA 0.000–41.655	Reno			76	Stead Boulevard (SR 673 south)	Serves Reno Stead Airport
Washoe; WA 0.000–41.655	Reno			78	Red Rock (Red Rock Road)	
Washoe; WA 0.000–41.655	Reno			80	White Lake Parkway – Cold Springs	
Washoe; WA 0.000–41.655	Reno			83	Village Parkway – Bordertown	
Washoe; WA 0.000–41.655	Reno	85.627	137.803		US 395 north – Susanville	Continuation into California
1.000 mi = 1.609 km; 1.000 km = 0.621 mi: Concurrency terminus

== Special routes ==
=== Current ===
- U.S. Route 395 Alternate, an alternate route between Carson City and Reno
- U.S. Route 395 Business, a business route in Carson City
- U.S. Route 395 Business, a little-signed business route in Reno

=== Former ===
- U.S. Route 395 Alternate, a former alternate route of US 395 on Sierra Street in Reno
- U.S. Route 395 Temporary, a former temporary route mostly on Kietzke Lane in Reno

== See also ==
U.S. Route 395
Previous state: California	Nevada	Next state: California
