= Sun Valley, Nevada =

- Census-designated place
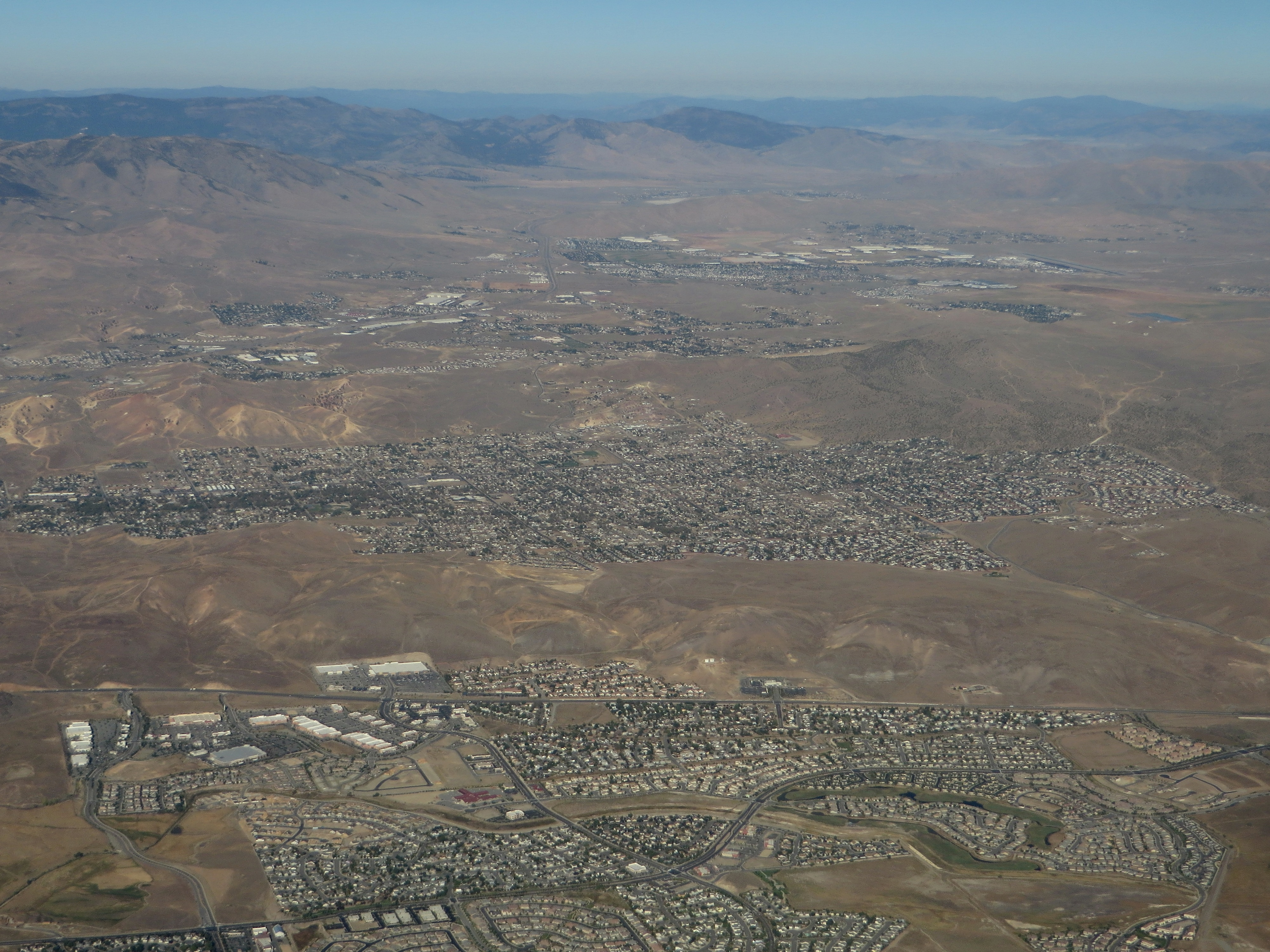
- Aerial view of Sun Valley

- Location within the state of Nevada
- Coordinates: 39°35′47″N 119°46′34″W
- Country: United States
- State: Nevada
- County: Washoe

Area
  - Total: 14.58 sq mi (37.75 km^{2})
  - Land: 14.58 sq mi (37.75 km^{2})
  - Water: 0 sq mi (0.00 km^{2})
- Elevation: 4,725 ft (1,440 m)

Population (2020)
  - Total: 21,178
  - Density: 1,453.2/sq mi (561.07/km^{2})
- Time zone: UTC−8 (Pacific (PST))
  - Summer (DST): UTC−7 (PDT)
- ZIP code: 89433
- Area code: 775
- FIPS code: 32-71600
- GNIS feature ID = 848697: 848697

Sun Valley is a census-designated place (CDP) in Washoe County, Nevada, United States. The population was 21,178 at the 2020 census. It is north of Reno and is part of the Reno-Sparks metropolitan area.

== Geography ==
The community is located within Sun Valley approximately three miles north of Reno on Nevada State Route 443.

According to the United States Census Bureau, the CDP has a total area of 14.9 square miles (38.6 km^{2}), all land.

== Demographics ==
Historical population
| Census | Pop. | Note | %± |
|---|---|---|---|
| 2020 | 21,178 | | — |
U.S. Decennial Census

=== 2020 census ===
As of the 2020 census, Sun Valley had a population of 21,178. The median age was 34.9 years. 26.7% of residents were under the age of 18 and 12.7% of residents were 65 years of age or older. For every 100 females there were 103.6 males, and for every 100 females age 18 and over there were 102.7 males age 18 and over.

99.3% of residents lived in urban areas, while 0.7% lived in rural areas.

There were 6,525 households in Sun Valley, of which 41.2% had children under the age of 18 living in them. Of all households, 48.1% were married-couple households, 20.0% were households with a male householder and no spouse or partner present, and 22.1% were households with a female householder and no spouse or partner present. About 17.1% of all households were made up of individuals and 8.1% had someone living alone who was 65 years of age or older.

There were 6,807 housing units, of which 4.1% were vacant. The homeowner vacancy rate was 1.3% and the rental vacancy rate was 4.1%.

Racial composition as of the 2020 census
| Race | Number | Percent |
|---|---|---|
| White | 10,052 | 47.5% |
| Black or African American | 281 | 1.3% |
| American Indian and Alaska Native | 529 | 2.5% |
| Asian | 385 | 1.8% |
| Native Hawaiian and Other Pacific Islander | 201 | 0.9% |
| Some other race | 6,042 | 28.5% |
| Two or more races | 3,688 | 17.4% |
| Hispanic or Latino (of any race) | 10,728 | 50.7% |

=== 2000 census ===
As of the census of 2000, there were 19,461 people, 6,380 households, and 4,816 families living in the CDP. The population density was 1,297.2 inhabitants per square mile (500.9/km^{2}). There were 6,703 housing units at an average density of 446.8 per square mile (172.5/km^{2}). The racial makeup of the CDP was 79.78% White, 2.20% African American, 1.93% Native American, 2.21% Asian, 0.62% Pacific Islander, 9.51% from other races, and 3.74% from two or more races. Hispanic or Latino of any race were 21.13% of the population.

There were 6,380 households, out of which 40.7% had children under the age of 18 living with them, 54.3% were married couples living together, 13.7% had a female householder with no husband present, and 24.5% were non-families. 15.6% of all households were made up of individuals, and 4.4% had someone living alone who was 65 years of age or older. The average household size was 3.05 and the average family size was 3.39.

In the CDP, the population was spread out, with 30.8% under the age of 18, 8.5% from 18 to 24, 32.5% from 25 to 44, 20.8% from 45 to 64, and 7.5% who were 65 years of age or older. The median age was 32 years. For every 100 females, there were 102.1 males. For every 100 females age 18 and over, there were 100.0 males.

The median income for a household in the CDP was $41,346, and the median income for a family was $43,103. Males had a median income of $30,804 versus $24,059 for females. The per capita income for the CDP was $15,171. 10.5% of the population and 6.8% of families were below the poverty line. 13.1% of those under the age of 18 and 5.2% are 65 or older.
