= List of Interstate Highways in Nevada =

Interstate Highways in Nevada
- Standard route markers for Interstate 80, Interstate 580, and Interstate 80 Business
- Interstate Highways highlighted in red

System information
- Maintained by NDOT

Highway names
- Interstates: Interstate X (I-X)
- Business routes: Interstate X Business (I-X Bus.)

System links
- Nevada State Highway System; Interstate; US; State; Pre‑1976; Scenic

The following is a list of Interstate highways in the U.S. state of Nevada. All active mainline Interstates are maintained by the Nevada Department of Transportation.

Interstate business loops are only state-maintained where they overlap with an active State Route or U.S. route.

== Main routes ==
Number	Length (mi)	Length (km)	Southern or western terminus	Northern or eastern terminus	Formed	Removed	Notes
I-11	54.193	87.215	US 93 at the Arizona state line	US 95 / SR 157 in Las Vegas	2017	current	Congressionally-designated future Interstate corridor with future alignment north to I-80 being studied
I-15	123.762	199.176	I-15 at the California state line	I-15 at the Arizona state line	1956	current	
I-80	410.458	660.568	I-80 at the California state line	I-80 at the Utah state line	1956	current	
I-215	11.173	17.981	I-11 / US 93 / US 95 / SR 564 in Henderson	I-15 / CC 215 in Enterprise	1993	current	
I-515	20.540	33.056	US 93 / US 95 in Henderson	I-15 / US 93 / US 95 in Las Vegas	1976	2024	Not signed until completed in 1994; resigned as I-11
I-580	35.050	56.408	US 50 / US 395 in Carson City	I-80 / US 395 in Reno	1978	current	Not signed until completed in 2012
Former

== Business routes ==
Number	Length (mi)	Length (km)	Southern or western terminus	Northern or eastern terminus	Formed	Removed	Notes
I-15 BL	3.132	5.040	I-15 at exit 120 in Mesquite	I-15 at exit 122 in Mesquite	c. 1991	c. 2005	Overlapped SR 144
I-80 BL	4.3	6.9	I-80 at exit 1 in Verdi	I-80 at exit 5 in East Verdi	1982	current	Overlaps SR 425; Route not fully signed
I-80 BL	5.2	8.4	I-80 at exit 12 in Reno	I-80 at exit 19 in Sparks	1982	current	Overlaps part of former SR 647; Route not fully signed
I-80 BL	6.9	11.1	I-80 at exit 43 in Wadsworth	I-80 at exit 48 in Fernley	1982	current	Overlaps SR 427 and US 95 Alt.
I-80 BL	2.0	3.2	I-80 at exit 105 in Lovelock	I-80 at exit 107 in Lovelock	2000	current	Overlaps SR 396 and SR 856; Route signed prior to official creation
I-80 BL	7.5	12.1	I-80 at exit 173 west of Winnemucca	I-80 at exit 180 east of Winnemucca	1982	current	Overlaps US 95, SR 289 and SR 794
I-80 BL	3.4	5.5	I-80 at exit 229 in Battle Mountain	I-80 at exit 233 in Battle Mountain	1982	current	Overlaps SR 304
I-80 BL	3.0	4.8	I-80 at exit 279 west of Carlin	I-80 at exit 282 in Carlin	1982	current	Overlaps SR 221
I-80 BL	5.5	8.9	I-80 at exit 298 in Elko	I-80 at exit 303 in Elko	1982	current	Overlaps SR 535
I-80 BL	2.2	3.5	I-80 at exit 351 in Wells	I-80 at exit 352 in Wells	1982	current	Overlaps SR 223
I-80 BL	0.9	1.4	I-80 at exit 410 in West Wendover	Wendover city limits on Utah state line	c. 1982	current	Overlaps US 93 Alt. and former SR 221; Formation date uncertain
Former

== See also ==
- List of U.S. Routes in Nevada
- List of state routes in Nevada
