= List of U.S. Routes in Nevada =

U.S. Routes in Nevada
- Standard route marker for U.S. Routes in Nevada

System information
- Maintained by NDOT

Highway names
- US Highways: U.S. Route X (US X)

System links
- Nevada State Highway System; Interstate; US; State; Pre‑1976; Scenic

The following is a list of past and present U.S. Routes in the U.S. state of Nevada. All active mainline and alternate routes are maintained by the Nevada Department of Transportation. Some active special routes are maintained by local municipalities, and may not be signed on the route itself.

== Main routes ==
Number	Length (mi)	Length (km)	Southern or western terminus	Northern or eastern terminus	Formed	Removed	Notes
US 6	305.647	491.891	US 6 on California state line towards Benton, Calif.	US 6 / US 50 on Utah state line towards Delta, Utah	1937	current	
US 40	—	—	US 40 on California state line near Verdi	US 40 on Utah state line in West Wendover	1939	1975	Route corridor supplanted by I-80
US 50	408.82	657.93	US 50 on California state line in Stateline	US 6 / US 50 on Utah state line towards Delta, Utah	1926	current	
US 91	—	—	US 91 on California state line in Primm	US 91 on Arizona state line in Mesquite	1926	1974	Route corridor supplanted by I-15
US 93	527	848	US 93 on Arizona state line near Hoover Dam	US 93 on Idaho state line in Jackpot	1926	current	
US 95	646.71	1,040.78	US 95 on California state line towards Needles, Calif.	US 95 on Oregon state line in McDermitt	1940	current	
US 395	85.192	137.103	US 395 on California state line near Topaz Lake, Calif.	US 395 on California state line northwest of Cold Springs	1934	current	
US 466	—	—	US 91 / US 466 on California state line in Primm	US 93 / US 466 on Arizona state line at Hoover Dam	1935	1971	Route corridor supplanted by I-15 and I-11
Former

== Special routes ==
Number	Length (mi)	Length (km)	Southern or western terminus	Northern or eastern terminus	Formed	Removed	Notes
US 40 Alt.	—	—	US 40 / US 395 in Reno	US 395 on California state line near Cold Springs	—	c. 1976	Continued into California
US 50 Alt.	—	—	US 6 / US 50 / US 93 in Ely	Old US 40 / US 50 Alt. on Utah state line in West Wendover	—	1976	Continued to Moark Junction, Utah
US 50 Alt.	32.6	52.5	US 50 / US 95 Alt. in Silver Springs	US 50 west of Fallon	1976	current	
US 93 Alt.	117.0	188.3	US 93 at Lages Station	I-80 / US 93 in Wells	1976	current	
US 93 Bus.	9.517	15.316	I-11 / US 93 / SR 172 east of Boulder City	I-11 / US 93 / US 95 west of Boulder City	2017	current	
US 95 Alt.	4.40	7.08	US 93 / US 95 / US 466 in Las Vegas	US 95 in Las Vegas	c. 1953	c. 1989	
US 95 Alt.	—	—	US 50 / US 95 in Fallon	US 40 / US 95 north of Fallon	c. 1960	c. 1978	Prior route of US 95 through Fernley
US 95 Alt.	105.0	169.0	US 95 in Schurz	I-80 / US 95 north of Fallon	1941	current	Extended in mid-1970s
US 95 Bus.	6.7	10.8	I-11/US 95 in Las Vegas (at exit 38)	I-11/US 95 in Las Vegas (at exit 48A)	1982	current	Overlaps with SR 599
US 95 Truck	1.297	2.087	US 95 east of Hawthorne	US 95 in Hawthorne	—	—	Overlaps with SR 362
US 395 Alt.	20.082	32.319	I-580 / US 395 near Washoe City (at exit 10)	I-580 / US 395 in Reno (at exit 29)	2012	current	
US 395 Bus.	—	—	I-580 / US 50 / US 395 in Carson City	I-580 / US 395 in Carson City	2009	current	
US 395 Bus.	14.8	23.8	I-580 / US 395 / SR 431 in Reno	US 395 north of Reno	1982	current	
Former

== See also ==
- List of Interstate Highways in Nevada
- List of state routes in Nevada
- List of Nevada Scenic Byways
