= Nevada State Route 429 =

Highway in Nevada

State Route 429
- Bowers Mansion Road; Old US 395
- SR 429 highlighted in red

Route information
- Maintained by NDOT
- Length: 7.824 mi (12.592 km)
- Existed: July 1, 1976–August 24, 2012

Major junctions
- South end: US 395 / Hobart Road in Washoe Valley
- SR 877 in Washoe Valley
- North end: US 395 / SR 430 in Washoe City

Location
- Country: United States
- State: Nevada
- County: Washoe

Highway system
- Nevada State Highway System; Interstate; US; State; Pre‑1976; Scenic

State Route 429 (SR 429) was a rural state highway located in southern Washoe County, Nevada. It followed Bowers Mansion Road, a former alignment of U.S. Route 395 (US 395). The SR 429 designation was retired on August 24, 2012 and the route has since become part of U.S. Route 395 Alternate.

== Route description ==
SR 429 began at Hobart Road, near the Carson City – Washoe County line immediately adjacent to present-day Interstate 580 (I-580) and US 395. From this point, the SR 429 paralleled US 395 northward for about 1.2 miles (1.9 km) and then shifted westward to follow the foothills of the mountains to the west. The highway continued northward past Bowers Mansion State Park before turning east to terminate at US 395 just south of Washoe City.

Occasionally, strong crosswinds are experienced on mainline US 395 through the Washoe Valley. When large-profile vehicles were prohibited on US 395 due to high wind, motorists were advised to detour onto SR 429. A slip ramp to US 395 at the highway's southern terminus facilitated this detour in the southbound direction.

== History ==
SR 429 is an old alignment of US 395 and former SR 3.

SR 429 was the original US 395 highway alignment connecting Carson City to Reno. By 1970, a new divided highway alignment was opened to traffic between the Carson City limits and the northern terminus of present-day SR 429. US 395 was switched to this new alignment and present-day SR 429 remained in the state system with an unknown highway number.

With the completion of the I-580 freeway extension between the Washoe Valley and Reno on August 20, 2012, the SR 429 designation was dropped and the majority of the highway became part of US 395 Alternate—the southernmost section between Hobart Road and Eastlake Boulevard is now classified as a frontage road.

== Major intersections ==
This table lists major intersections as they existed prior to the elimination of SR 429 on August 24, 2012. The entire route was in Washoe County.

Location	mi	km	Destinations	Notes
Washoe Valley	0.000	0.000	US 395 south / Hobart Road – Carson City	Southern terminus
Washoe Valley			Eastlake Boulevard	Former SR 428 north; access to US 395 north
Washoe Valley	1.50	2.41	SR 877 north (Franktown Road)	Southern terminus of SR 877
Washoe Valley			SR 877 south (Franktown Road)	Northern terminus of SR 877
Washoe City	7.824	12.592	US 395 / SR 430 north – Carson City, Reno	Northern terminus
1.000 mi = 1.609 km; 1.000 km = 0.621 mi
