= Ophir Creek (Lake Washoe) =

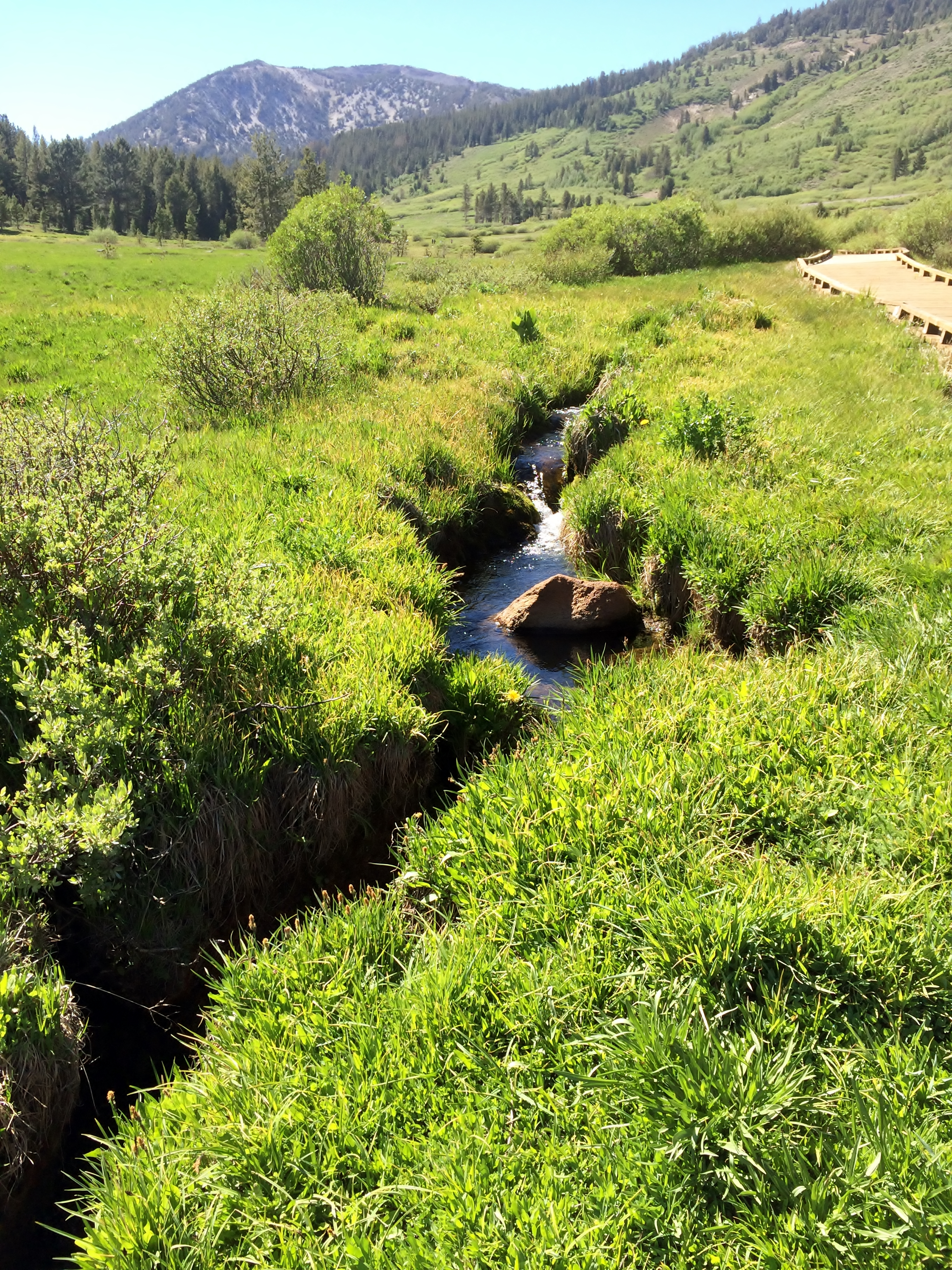
- One of several tributaries of Ophir Creek in subalpine Tahoe Meadows with the Carson Range's Relay Peak in distance and the Ophir Creek Trail boardwalk on the right.

Location
- Country: United States
- State: Nevada
- Region: Washoe County

Physical characteristics
- Source
  - location: Tahoe Meadows south of Mount Rose Summit, a mountain pass of Nevada State Route 431, Carson Range, Sierra Nevada in western Nevada, United States
  - coordinates: 39°18′15″N 119°55′42″W
  - elevation: 8,594 ft (2,619 m)
- Mouth: Washoe Lake
  - coordinates: 39°17′18″N 119°48′53″W
  - elevation: 5,036 ft (1,535 m)

Ophir Creek is a 7.7-mile (12.4 km) eastward-flowing stream originating in Tahoe Meadows just south of Tamarack Peak and southeast of Mount Rose Summit, a pass on Nevada State Highway 431. Ophir Creek flows to Washoe Lake in Washoe County in western Nevada, shortly after passing under U.S. Route 395.

== History ==
Ophir Creek is named for the 1853 discovery of the Comstock Ophir bonanza, a major silver discovery. Ophir was classically a wealthy region described in the Bible, from where King Solomon received tribute of gold, silver, and other precious items. To reduce the silver metal from the ore from the Comstock Ophir mine, the Ophir Mining Company erected the Ophir Mill in 1861 on Washoe Lake's (what was then Washoe Marsh) west shore. A historic marker just north of Ophir Creek on U.S. Route 395 marks its location (39°17'48.2"N 119°49'45.0"W) Closet Street Makayla Way.

Upper and Lower Price Lakes were named for W. E. Price, a sawmill operator and assemblyman for Washoe County in 1873. A 1983 landslide from aptly named Slide Mountain abruptly filled Lower Price Lake.

== Watershed and course ==
Ophir Creek is part of the Steamboat Creek/Washoe Lake subwatershed of the Truckee River watershed. The Ophir Creek watershed drains 6.5 square miles (17 km^{2}).

Ophir Creek's watershed includes two lakes, Upper Price Lake at 7,241 feet (2,207 m) and Rock Lake at 6,503 feet (1,982 m).

== Ecology ==
In 2009 the federal Bureau of Land Management acquired a 69-acre parcel between Davis Regional County Park and Bowers Mansion County Park pursuant to the Southern Nevada Public Land Management Act (SNPLMA), which was enacted in 1998. This protects environmentally sensitive land including lower Ophir Creek and two specially designated species that require wetland or flowing water habitat, the Carson Silverspot butterfly (Speyeria nokomis carsonensis) and the mountain yellow-legged frog (Rana muscosa). It also includes the historic Ophir Flume, built in 1856 by Mormon settlers, which still carries water from Ophir Creek to ranches in the southwestern Washoe Valley.

== Recreation ==
The Ophir Creek Trail can be accessed at the top by parking on the side of Nevada State Highway 431 at Tahoe Meadows, 0.8 miles (1.3 km) southwest of the Mount Rose Summit pass and 7.7 miles (12.4 km) northeast of Incline Village. Here the hiker may also access the Tahoe Rim Trail. The Ophir Creek Trail begins on boardwalks through the verdant, subalpine Tahoe Meadows then descends 3.3 miles (5.3 km) to Upper Price Lake. From here hikers can reclimb the 1,600 feet (490 m) descent or continue down another 4.7 miles (7.6 km) to the trailhead at the bottom in Davis Creek Regional Park on the western edge of the Washoe Valley. The Davis Creek Regional Park has a parking area near the intersection of Davis Creek Road and U.S. Route 395 (see map in External links below).
