= Morgan Jones (actor, born 1928) =

American actor (1928–2012)

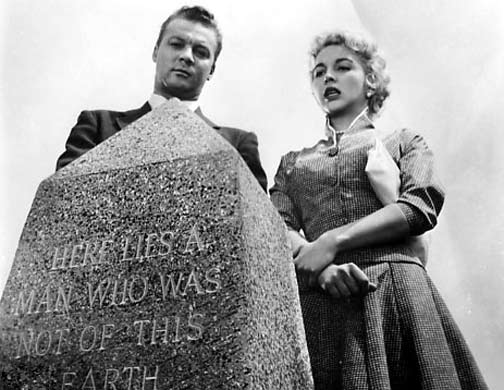
- Jones (left) with Beverly Garland in Not of This Earth, 1957
- Born: Morgan Adair Jones; June 15, 1928; Wooster, Ohio
- Died: January 13, 2012 (aged 83); Tarzana, California
- Occupation: Actor
- Years active: 1948-1986
- Spouse(s): Joan Granville (?-1974) (her death) (1 child); Carole Tetzlaff (1976-2006) (her death)

Morgan Adair Jones (June 15, 1928 – January 13, 2012) was an American film and television actor. His acting credits, which included more than 170 roles in television, included reoccurring appearances in Highway Patrol during the 1950s and The Blue Angels, starring along with Dennis Cross, Warner Jones, Michael Galloway and Don Gordon.

== Early life ==
Jones was born in Wooster in Wayne County in northeastern Ohio. He enlisted in the United States Navy and moved to California when he was stationed at Naval Base Coronado.

== Career ==
Jones played Nevada mining magnate Sandy Bowers in the 1955 episode, "The Crystal Gazer," of the syndicated television anthology series, Death Valley Days, hosted by Stanley Andrews. Natalie Norwick (1923-2007) was cast as Mrs. Bowers, the former Eilley Orrum, who consults a crystal ball to guide her decisions. She helped Bowers to locate a gold strike. The two marry, spend recklessly on a world tour, and build the still-standing Bowers Mansion between Reno and Carson City. Bowers dies of silicosis, a lung disease that affects miners, and Eilley is left with many unpaid bills for which she was responsible. She had not foreseen that their fortune would run dry so quickly. He was a supporting actor on Highway Patrol (1956), and appeared on Wagon Train S2 E36 "The Rodney Lawrence Story" as Jason Elliott, who agrees to leave the wagon train with his homesick wife, played by Diana Barth (1959).

Jones appeared some twenty-five times on the screen. He had a lead role in the 1957 science fiction film, Not of This Earth, by Roger Corman, as well as other castings in Apache Woman in 1955, Forbidden Planet in 1956, Fear Strikes Out in 1957, Official Detective episode 'The Night It Rained Bullets' as Bronson (1957), Bells Are Ringing in 1960.

He appeared in The Twilight Zone episodes "Will the Real Martian Please Stand Up?" in 1961, and "The Parallel" in 1963. In 1966 he appeared in Gunsmoke.

Jones appeared in an episode of the 1970 situation comedy The Tim Conway Show and a 1965 episode of Hazel.

== Personal life ==
Jones was married twice, and became a widower in both marriages. His first marriage was to actress and talent agent Joan Granville, ending with her death in 1974. His second wife, Carole Tetzlaff, whom he married in the 1970s, was the daughter of cinematographer, Ted Tetzlaff.

Jones relocated to Hollywood after leaving the U.S. Navy in order to pursue acting. His first professional acting role was a small part in the 1952 musical, Singin' in the Rain.

=== Death ===
Morgan Jones died in Tarzana in the San Fernando Valley of Los Angeles, California, at the age of 83. He was survived by his son and his granddaughter.
