= U.S. Route 395 Alternate =

Highway in Nevada

U.S. Route 395 Alternate
- U.S. Route 395 Alternate highlighted in red

Route information
- Maintained by NDOT
- Length: 20.082 mi (32.319 km)
- Existed: August 24, 2012–present

Major junctions
- South end: I-580 / US 395 / Bowers Mansion Road / Eastlake Boulevard in Washoe Valley
- I-580 / US 395 in Washoe City SR 341 / SR 431 in Reno I-580 / US 395 in Reno
- North end: US 395 Bus. / Patriot Boulevard in Reno

Location
- Country: United States
- State: Nevada
- County: Washoe

Highway system
- United States Numbered Highway System; List; Special; Divided; Nevada State Highway System; Interstate; US; State; Pre‑1976; Scenic

U.S. Route 395 Alternate (US 395 Alt) is a 20.082-mile-long (32.319 km) alternate route of U.S. Route 395 (US 395) in Washoe County, Nevada.

== Route description ==
=== Bowers Mansion Road ===
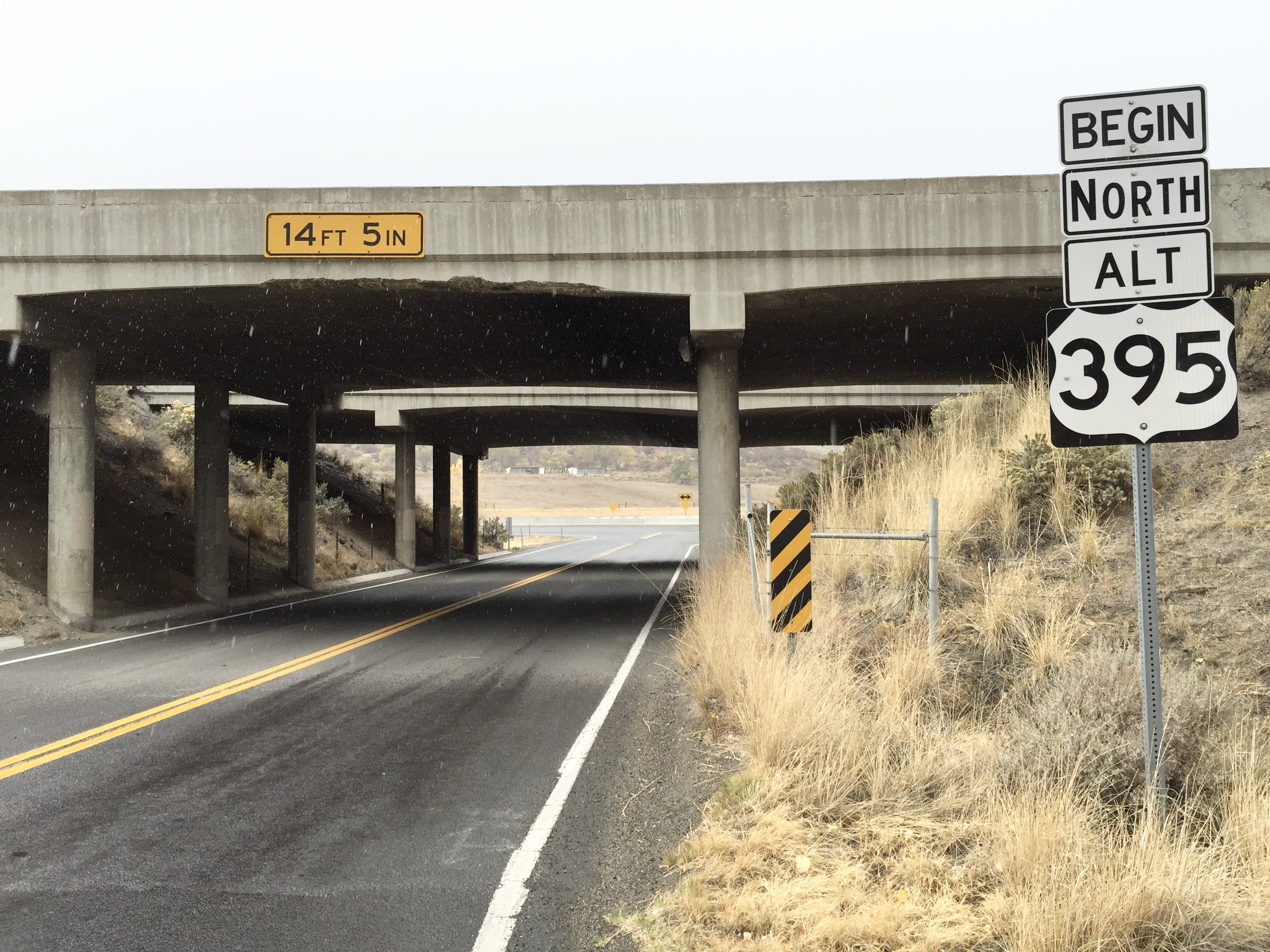
View north from the south end of US 395 Alt. as seen in 2015

The route begins at the intersection of Eastlake Boulevard and Bowers Mansion Road/Old US 395 near Franktown just north of Carson City. The highway winds along the mountains on the west side of Washoe Valley as it meanders northward. The highway passes the historic Bowers Mansion state park before intersecting Interstate 580 (I-580) and US 395 near Winters Ranch.

=== Carson–Reno Highway ===
After passing over the interstate, US 395 Alt. becomes the four-lane Carson–Reno Highway. It curves northeast north through the small town of Washoe City. As the highway exits the town, it briefly climbs southeast of Washoe Hill to ascend Washoe Summit at an elevation of 5,089 feet (1,551 m). The second junction with Eastlake Boulevard (former SR 428) the top of the hill is dubbed the "Washoe Hill Memorial" and is dedicated to victims of drunk driving. As the road descends, it curves north once again to enter Pleasant Valley. The route crosses over Steamboat Creek and Jones Creek as it passes through the rural community.

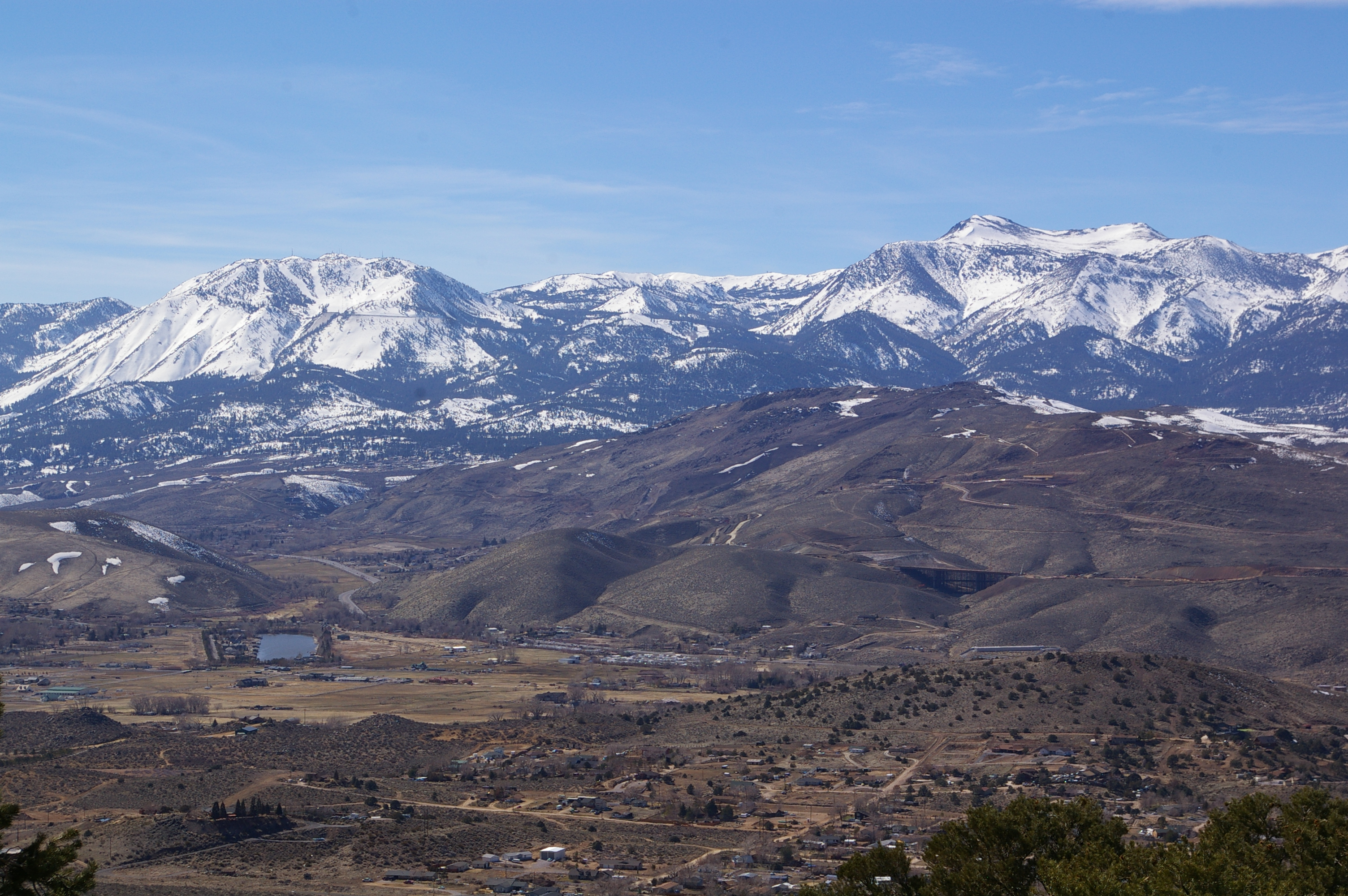
Overlooking US 395 Alt. as it passes through Steamboat Hills as seen in 2008.

After leaving Pleasant Valley, US 395 Alt. curves east and north again to travel through Steamboat Hills. Development of this small community dates back to 1859, when a small resort was established that took advantage of the natural hot springs nearby. Steamboat's springs are still active today, producing geothermal power for northwest Nevada since 1991.

The highway meets the Mount Rose Junction just north of Steamboat. This junction provides access to Mount Rose and North Lake Tahoe via Mount Rose Highway (State Route 431), as well as Virginia City to the southeast by Geiger Grade (State Route 341).

=== South Virginia Street ===
Passing the Mount Rose Junction, US 395 Alt. enters the Reno city limits and becomes South Virginia Street. The route continues north to intersect a half-interchange with I-580 and US 395 north. Passing under the freeway, the U.S. Route 395 Business designation begins. The roadway turns slightly more westward as it travels further north into Reno. In about three miles (5 km), the highway again meets the I-580 / US 395 freeway. US 395 Alt reaches its northern terminus just north of there, at the intersection of South Virginia Street and Patriot Boulevard; U.S. 395 Business, however continues to follow Virginia Street northward towards downtown Reno.

== History ==
All of this route previously served as the main alignment of US 395 at some point, with mainline US 395 being rerouted as bypassing freeway segments were constructed. With the completion of I-580 between Mount Rose Junction and Washoe City, the US 395 Alt designation was created to serve as a high-profile vehicle detour during high wind conditions on the interstate.

Prior to the establishment of US 395 Alt. in 2012, the Bowers Mansion Road section of the highway was previously designated State Route 429 while the Carson–Reno Highway and Virginia Street sections were part of State Route 430. Both state routes were removed from these highways in favor of the alternate route.

== Major intersections ==
The entire route is in Washoe County.

Location	mi	km	Destinations	Notes
Washoe Valley	0.000	0.000	Eastlake Boulevard	Continuation beyond southern terminus; former SR 428 north
Washoe Valley	0.000	0.000	I-580 north / US 395 north – Reno	Interchange; no southbound entrance; I-580 exit 10
Washoe Valley	0.000	0.000	To I-580 south / US 395 south / Bowers Mansion Road – Carson City	Former SR 429 south/US 395 south
Washoe Valley			SR 877 north (Franktown Road)	Southern terminus of SR 877
Washoe Valley			SR 877 south (Franktown Road)	Northern terminus of SR 877
Washoe City			I-580 / US 395 – Carson City, Reno	Interchange; I-580 exit 16
Reno			SR 341 south (Geiger Grade) / SR 431 west (Mount Rose Highway) – Virginia City, North Lake Tahoe	Northern terminus of SR 341; eastern terminus of SR 431
Reno			I-580 north / US 395 north – Reno	Interchange; northbound entrance and southbound exit; southern end of US 395 Bus. concurrency; I-580 exit 25
Reno			South Meadows Parkway (SR 426 east) / Foothill Road	Western terminus of SR 426
Reno			Holcomb Ranch Lane (SR 671 north)	Southern terminus of SR 671
Reno			I-580 / US 395 – Carson City, Susanville	Interchange; no northbound exit to S. Virginia Street south; I-580 exit 29
Reno	20.082	32.319	Patriot Boulevard	Northern end of US 395 Bus. concurrency
Reno	20.082	32.319	US 395 Bus. north (S. Virginia Street)	Continuation beyond northern terminus; former SR 430 north/US 395 north
1.000 mi = 1.609 km; 1.000 km = 0.621 mi: Concurrency terminus; Incomplete access
