= Nevada State Route 877 =

State highway in Nevada, United States

State Route 877
- Franktown Road
- SR 877 highlighted in red

Route information
- Maintained by NDOT
- Length: 4.296 mi (6.914 km)
- Existed: July 1, 1976–present

Major junctions
- South end: US 395 Alt. in Washoe Valley
- North end: US 395 Alt. in Washoe Valley

Location
- Country: United States
- State: Nevada
- County: Washoe

Highway system
- Nevada State Highway System; Interstate; US; State; Pre‑1976; Scenic
← SR 860	→ SR 878

State Route 877 (SR 877) is a state highway in rural Washoe County, Nevada. It runs along Franktown Road in the western reaches of the Washoe Valley.

== Route description ==
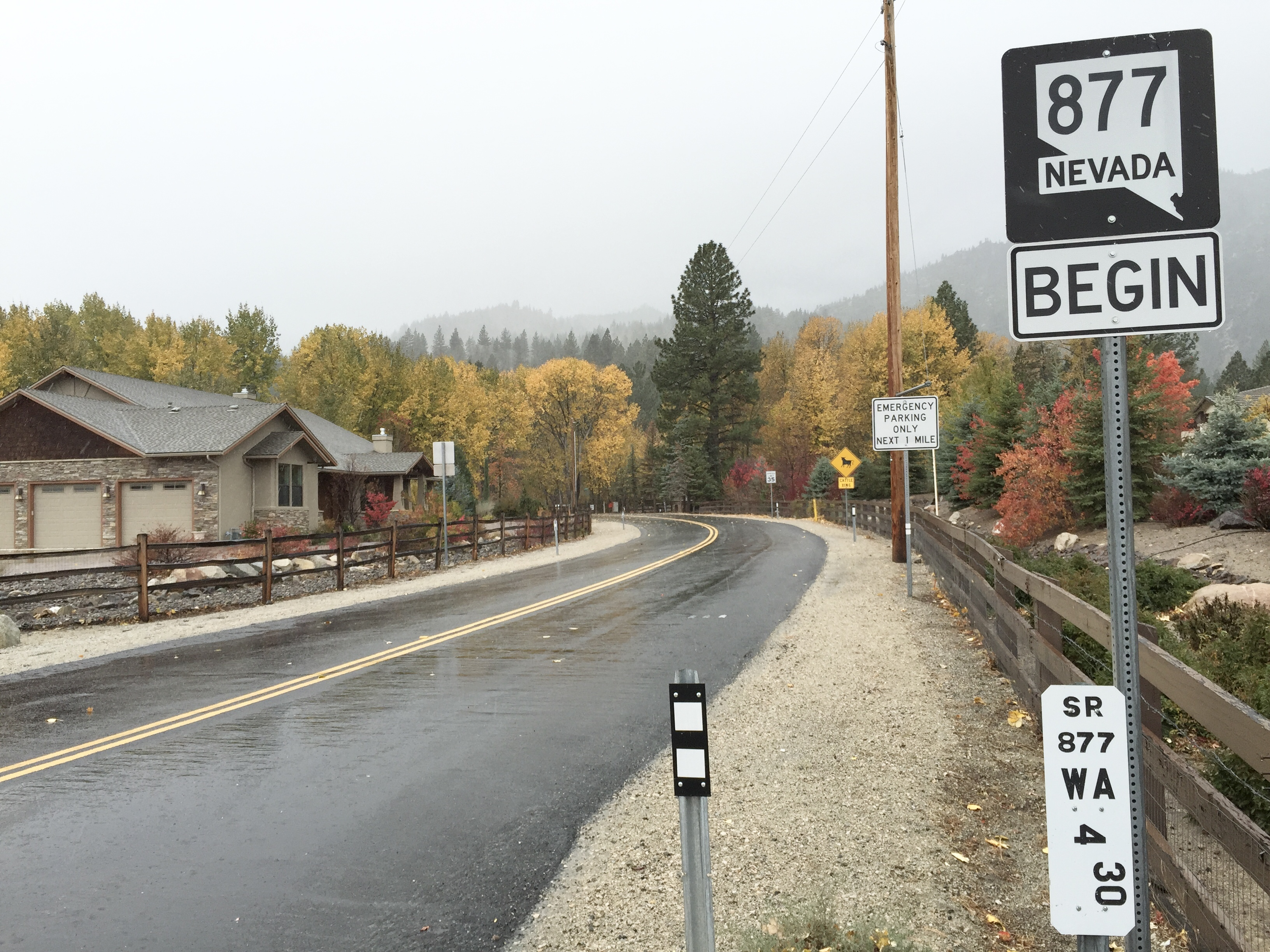
View at the north end of SR 877 looking south as seen in 2015

SR 877 begins in Washoe Valley, 2.0 miles (3.2 km) north of the Carson City–Washoe County line. The route begins at the intersection of Bowers Mansion Road/U.S. Route 395 Alternate (US 395 Alt.) and Franktown Road. From there, the highway follows Franktown Road west and then north for about 4.3 miles (6.9 km) through the eastern foothills of the Carson Range on the western side of Washoe Valley. Franktown Road comes to an end at a second intersection with US 395 Alt., just south of Bowers Mansion.

According to Deke Castleman, author of the Nevada Handbook (Moon Publications), "this few-mile drive along Franktown Road is one of the state's prettiest scenic valley and foothill stretches of road."

== Major intersections ==
The entire route is in Washoe Valley, Washoe County.

mi	km	Destinations	Notes
0.000	0.000	US 395 Alt. (Bowers Mansion Road, Old US 395)	Southern terminus; former SR 429/US 395
4.296	6.914	US 395 Alt. (Bowers Mansion Road, Old US 395)	Northern terminus; former SR 429/US 395
1.000 mi = 1.609 km; 1.000 km = 0.621 mi
