= Sandy Bowers =

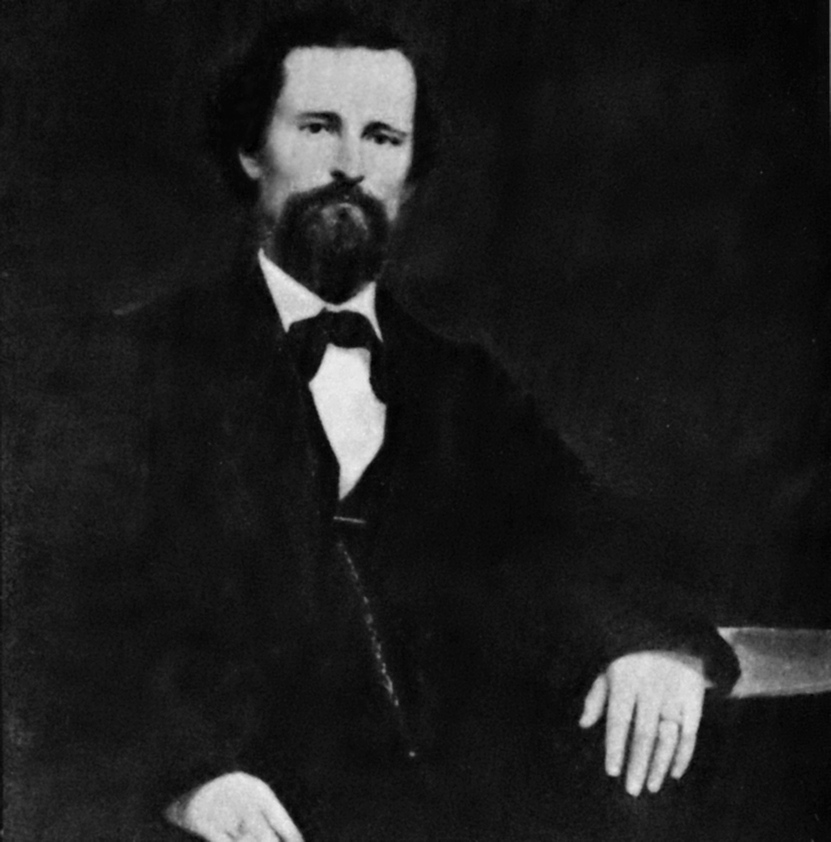
Sandy Bowers

"I've had powerful good luck, and I've got money to throw at the birds." (Bowers, 1861)

—

Lemuel Sanford Bowers (nickname: "Sandy") (February 24, 1833 – April 21, 1868) was an American teamster of Irish descent, miner and owner of the Crown Point Mine near Gold Hill, Nevada. Bowers and his wife were the Nevada Territory's first millionaires. Their home, the Bowers Mansion, was the first of the stately homes built in Nevada with the wealth from the Comstock Lode.

== Biography ==
Bowers was born in Madison County, Illinois. After coming west in 1856 and spending some time in Sacramento, he soon traveled to Gold Hill. A new mining community located south of where Virginia City, Nevada is today. Sandy quickly began investing in mining claims. Once his claims were set, he bought, sold and traded his investments.

Bowers and James Rogers registered their holdings for a 20-foot mining claim in Gold Canyon on January 28, 1859. In 1859, Eilley purchased Rogers' half of the claim for $1,000 (approximately $36,000 today). Though she was married at the time to someone else, Eilley married Bowers on August 9, 1859, and ten months later, she divorced Alexander Cowan on grounds of desertion.

Their first two children, a son, John Jasper Bowers (June 28, 1860 – August 27, 1860), and a daughter, Theresa Fortunatas Bowers (June 16, 1861 – September 17, 1861) died as infants. Shortly thereafter, the Bowers decided to build a home and they travelled to Europe between 1861 and 1863 to purchase furnishings for their mansion and had a desire to meet Queen Victoria, who did not give them an audience. The couple returned to Nevada in April 1863, accompanied by an adopted baby girl, Margaret Persia Bowers. With furnishings, they spent $407,000 (approximately $8,378,000 today). Though Bowers could only read and write a little, every book in the Bowers Mansion library had his name on it. The Bowers Mansion in Carson City, Nevada, completed in 1864, is an example of fine homes built in Nevada by those who became rich as a result of the Comstock Lode mining boom.

By 1865, the Nevada mines were reaching the end of their heyday. Rich and miserable, Bowers preferred living in a shack while his wife preferred spending their millions of dollars. He moved back to Gold Hill, attempting to save their mine, with poor results. In early 1868, he tried to sell a portion of the mine but died on April 21 at the age of 35 from silicosis, a common lung disease amongst miners. Bowers is buried in back of the mansion at the top of a rise. His estate was appraised to be worth $638,000 at the time of his death.

The "Sandy Bowers Claim" still exists, though it became a part of the "Consolidated Imperial" before control was taken over by Sutro Tunnel Coalition, Inc.

The actor Morgan Jones played Bowers in the 1955 episode, "The Crystal Gazer," of the syndicated television anthology series, Death Valley Days, hosted by Stanley Andrews. Natalie Norwick (1923-2007) was cast as Mrs. Bowers, the former Eilley Orrum, who consults a crystal ball to guide her decisions. She helped Bowers to locate a gold strike. The two marry, spend recklessly on a world tour, and build the still-standing Bowers Mansion between Reno and Carson City. Bowers dies of a lung disease, and Eilley is left with many unpaid bills for which she was responsible. She had not foreseen that their fortune would run dry so quickly.

== Bibliography ==
- Rast, Sheila, ed. (1940). Nevada: A guide to the Silver State. Portland, OR: Binfords & Mort. ISBN 1-60354-027-X.
