= Michael Galloway (actor) =

American actor

- Born: Michael F. Galloway; May 8, 1925; Boise, Idaho, U.S.
- Died: October 12, 2010 (aged 85); Los Angeles, California, U.S.
- Education: University of Idaho; University of Southern California
- Occupation: Actor
- Spouse: Karen Galloway
- Children: 2

Michael F. Galloway (May 8, 1925 – October 12, 2010) was an American actor with more than three hundred and fifty film, television and theater credits throughout his career. He was perhaps best known for his role in the early 1960s television series, The Blue Angels, starring along with Dennis Cross, Morgan Jones, Warner Jones and Don Gordon.

Galloway was born in Boise, Idaho, on May 8, 1925. His father was a lawyer and he was the youngest of four brothers. Galloway enlisted in the United States Air Force during World War II. He enrolled at both the University of Idaho and the University of Southern California on basketball scholarships following the end of the war. Galloway began to pursue acting following a car accident which ended his athletic career.

Galloway died on October 12, 2010, in Los Angeles, California, at the age of 85.

== Filmography ==
- With a Song in My Heart (film) 1952 (uncredited)
- Suspense (American TV series) 1952
- Battle Circus (film) 1953 (uncredited)
- Medic (TV series) 1956
- Telephone Time 1956
- Dick Powell's Zane Grey Theater 1957
- Dragnet (1951 TV series) 1957
- The 20th Century Fox Hour 1957
- House of Numbers (1957 film) (uncredited)
- Broken Arrow (TV series) 1958
- Steve Canyon 1958
- In Love and War (1958 film) (uncredited)
- Maverick (TV series) 1959
- Frontier Doctor 1959
- The Texan (TV series) 1959
- Men into Space 1959
- The Blue Angels (TV series) 1960-61
- A Ticklish Affair 1963 (uncredited)
- Gordon's War 1973
- Tales of the Unexpected (TV series) 1984
