= Nevada State Route 878 =

State highway in Nevada, United States

State Route 878
- Slide Mountain Road
- SR 878 highlighted in red

Route information
- Maintained by NDOT
- Length: 1.022 mi (1.645 km)
- Existed: July 1, 1976–present

Major junctions
- South end: Mount Rose Ski Tahoe east parking area
- North end: SR 431 near Incline Village

Location
- Country: United States
- State: Nevada
- County: Washoe

Highway system
- Nevada State Highway System; Interstate; US; State; Pre‑1976; Scenic
← SR 877	→ SR 892

State Route 878 (SR 878) is a short state highway in Washoe County, Nevada. The highway is known as Slide Mountain Road.

== Route description ==
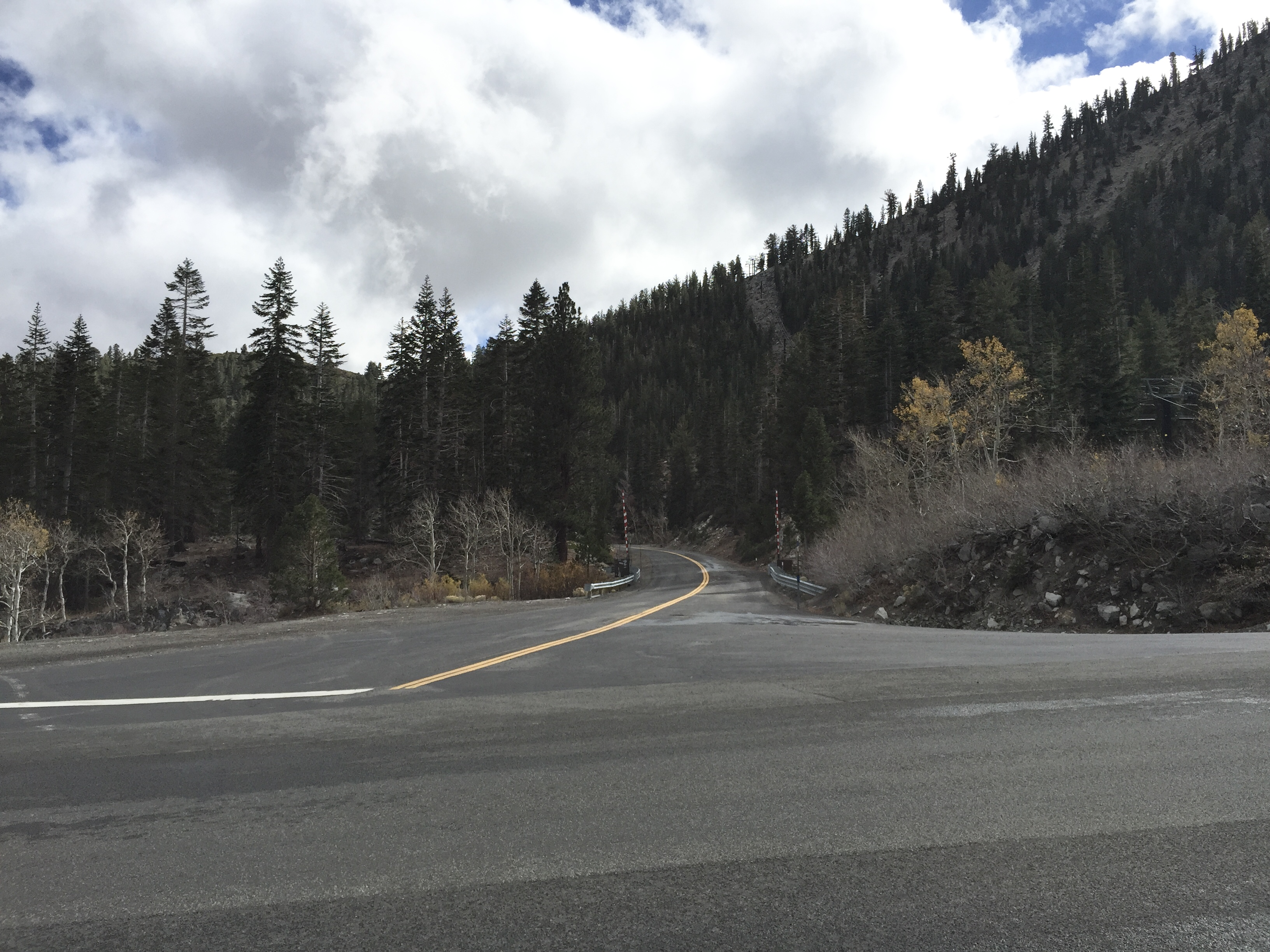
View at the north end of SR 878 looking south as seen in 2015

The southern terminus of SR 878 is at the eastern base of Slide Mountain, in the mountains of the Carson Range near Lake Tahoe, at the parking lot for the Winters Creek Lodge of the Mount Rose Ski Tahoe. From this point, one can see Washoe Valley and Washoe Lake in the distance. From here, the highway curves around the northeastern side of the mountain, traveling about one mile (1.6 km) to its northern terminus at an intersection with Mount Rose Highway (SR 431), not far from Mount Rose.

== History ==
Slide Mountain Road was first approved for the SR 878 designation on July 1, 1976.

== Major intersections ==
The entire route is in Washoe County.

Location	mi	km	Destinations	Notes
	0.000	0.000	Mount Rose Ski Tahoe east parking area	Southern terminus
	1.022	1.645	SR 431 (Mount Rose Highway) – Incline Village, Reno	Northern terminus
1.000 mi = 1.609 km; 1.000 km = 0.621 mi
