= Nevada State Route 671 =

State highway in Nevada, United States

State Route 671
- Holcomb Lane; Lakeside Drive; Huffaker Lane
- SR 671 highlighted in red

Route information
- Maintained by NDOT
- Length: 3.426 mi (5.514 km)
- Existed: April 27, 1983–present

Major junctions
- Counterclockwise end: US 395 Alt. / US 395 Bus. in Reno
- Clockwise end: Del Monte Lane / Huffaker Lane in Reno

Location
- Country: United States
- State: Nevada
- County: Washoe

Highway system
- Nevada State Highway System; Interstate; US; State; Pre‑1976; Scenic
← SR 667	→ SR 715

State Route 671 (SR 671) is a state highway in Washoe County, Nevada. It runs along Holcomb Lane and portions of Lakeside Drive and Huffaker Lane in an agricultural area of southern Reno.

== Route description ==
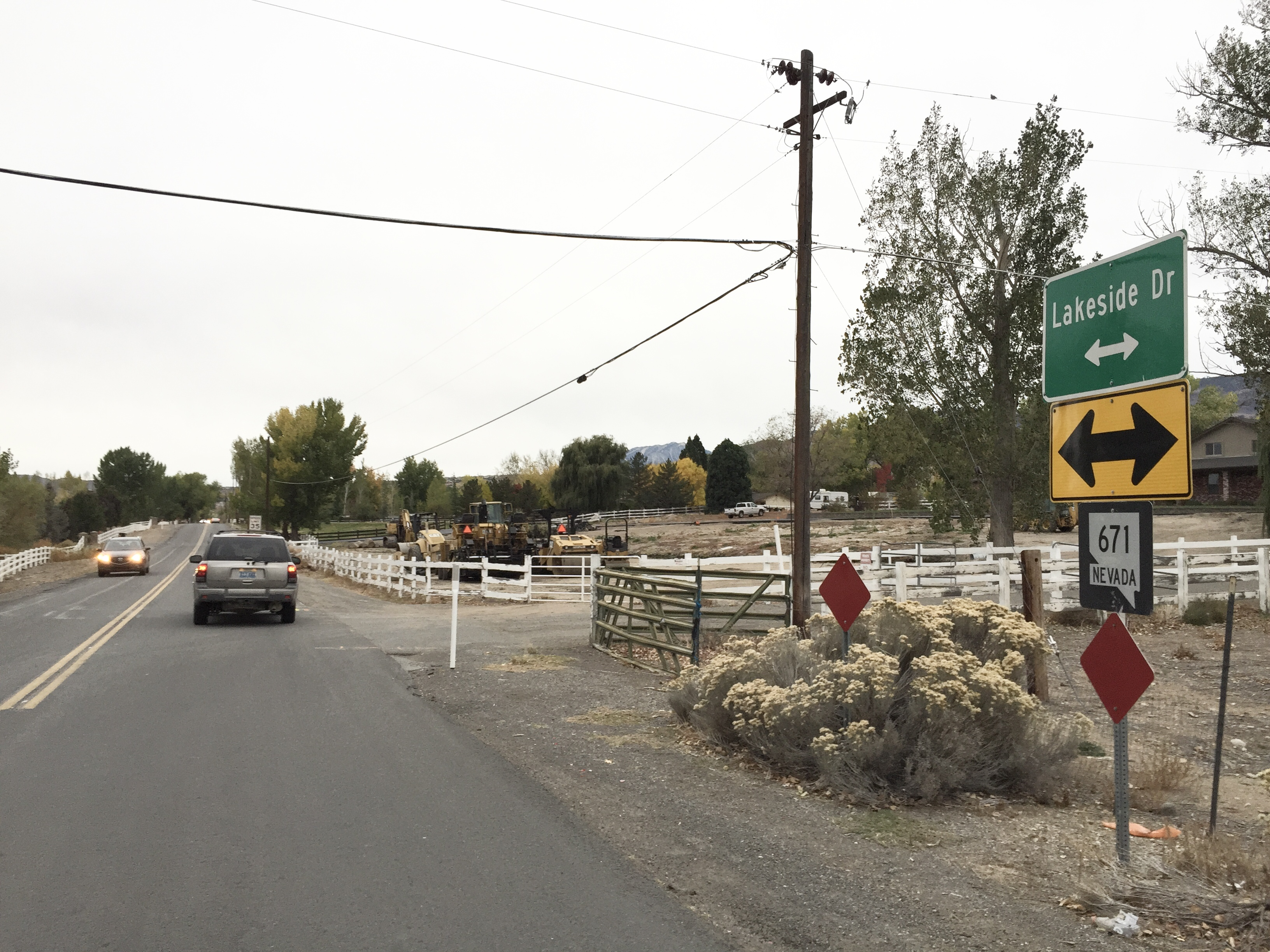
View south along Lakeside Drive (SR 671) at the intersection with Huffaker Drive as seen in 2015

State Route 671 begins at the intersection of South Virginia Street (U.S. Route 395 Alternate and U.S. Route 395 Business) and Holcomb Lane. From there, the route travels westward along Holcomb Lane (also called Holcomb Ranch Lane) as it passes through farmlike residential areas. After about 2.2 miles (3.5 km), the highway turns north off of Holcomb Lane onto Lakeside Drive. SR 671 passes through similar surroundings as it follows Lakeside Drive north. The route reaches an intersection with Huffaker Drive after 0.7 miles (1.1 km), where it turns east. SR 671 then follows Huffaker Lane nearly 0.5 miles (0.80 km) east before ending at the intersection of Huffaker Lane and Del Monte Lane.

== History ==
The route was originally designated on April 27, 1983. As of January 2001, the route had a distance of 4.543 miles (7.311 km). At that time, SR 671 continued east on Huffaker Lane to pass under Interstate 580 and U.S. Route 395 and end at the intersection of Huffaker Lane and South Virginia Street. The route was truncated to its current length by January 2008.

== Major intersections ==
The entire route is in Reno, Washoe County.

mi	km	Destinations	Notes
0.000	0.000	US 395 Alt. (S. Virginia Street) / US 395 Bus.	CCW terminus; former SR 430/US 395
3.426	5.514	Del Monte Lane	CW terminus
3.426	5.514	Huffaker Lane	Continuation beyond CW terminus; former SR 671 north
1.000 mi = 1.609 km; 1.000 km = 0.621 mi
