= College of the Pacific (University of the Pacific) =

Methodist college in Stockton, California, US

Coordinates: 37.9782°N 121.3153°W

College of the Pacific (less formally Pacific College) is the liberal arts college of the University of the Pacific, a private Methodist-affiliated university with its main campus in Stockton, California. The college offers degrees in the natural sciences, social sciences, humanities, and the fine and performing arts. Pacific College houses 18 academic departments in addition to special programs such as gender studies, ethnic studies, and film studies. A total of 31 majors and 36 minors are offered, and students may self-design a major or minor. In all, over 80 undergraduate majors are available across the University of the Pacific's schools and colleges.

== History ==
The College of the Pacific is the original and largest unit of the University of the Pacific. The University of the Pacific was founded in 1851 in Santa Clara, California and was renamed the College of the Pacific in 1911, to reflect its primary heritage as an undergraduate liberal arts college. The institution moved from Santa Clara to San Jose, California in 1871. In 1924, President Tully C. Knoles moved the College of the Pacific from San Jose to Stockton. At that time, the institution represented 17 of the current 18 departments in the College. There was also the Conservatory of Music and departments of education and engineering.

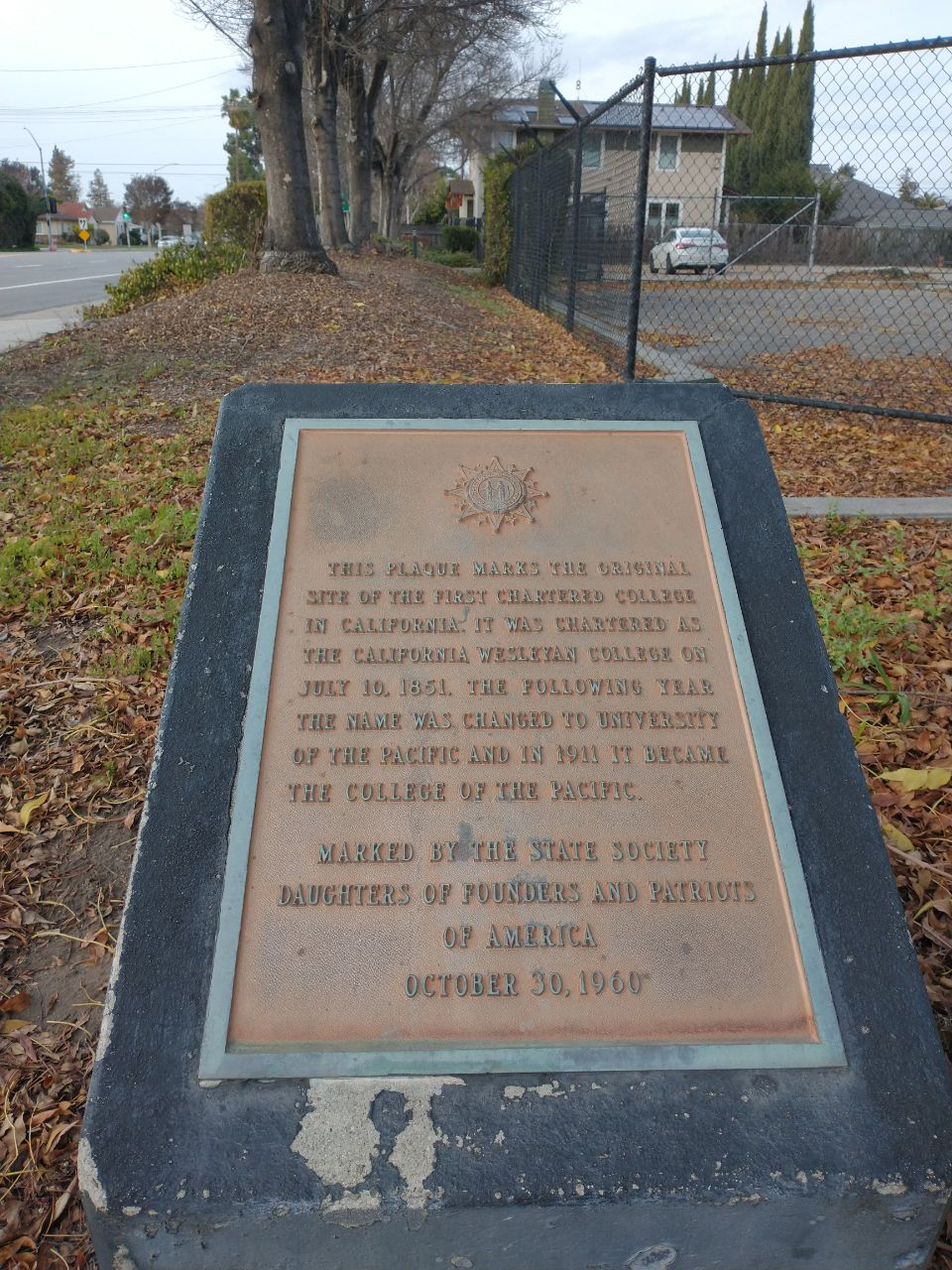
Plaque

In 1961, the now broad-based university reverted to its original name, University of the Pacific, and "College of the Pacific" became the designation for the institution's college of arts, letters and sciences.

The College of the Pacific is now one of eleven schools and colleges that make up the University of the Pacific.

== Academics ==
The College of the Pacific primarily serves undergraduate students, who can earn B.F.A., B.A., and B.S. degrees. The college also offers the graduate degrees of M.S., M.A., and a Ph.D.

The University of the Pacific's general education program is also administered through the College of the Pacific. The program includes the Pacific Seminars series in which students meet in small groups to engage in discussion about what makes a good society. Two of the Pacific Seminars courses are taken in the freshman year and one is taken in the senior year. These seminars develop students' critical thinking skills through extensive writing and reading in addition to the class discussion.

In 2006, the College of the Pacific was selected to host a new chapter of Phi Beta Kappa society. Typically, the college's students ranked in the top five percent academically are invited to join.

== Centers ==
The College of the Pacific houses three centers. The John Muir Center promotes environmentalism and supports the study of naturalist John Muir. The John Muir Papers are part of the University of the Pacific Library's Holt-Atherton Special Collections. The Jacoby Center for Public Service and Civic Leadership encourages the civic engagement of Pacific students and faculty through community service, research and internships. The Jacoby Center is responsible for the Sacramento Experience and Washington Semester internship programs, where students serve in California's state capital and the nation's capital, respectively. The Pacific Humanities Center promotes the value of art, music, theatre and film, as well as the traditional humanities disciplines—classical and religious studies, philosophy, literature and languages. The Humanities Center sponsors programs and events that highlight the importance of the humanities across the University and in the local community.

== Facilities ==
Located in the Stockton, California campus, the College of the Pacific facilities include six computer labs and 62 science laboratories. Some of the science labs are part of the new Biology building that was completed in 2008. The Visual Arts department facilities include the Reynolds Art Gallery. Two theatres, with adjacent scenic and costume design facilities, include Long Theatre, a proscenium theatre seating approximately 380 audience members, and DeMarcus Brown Studio Theatre, a "black box" theatre accommodating up to 250. The various science departments have a range of specialized scientific instrumentation and equipment.

== Notable alumni ==
- Dave Brubeck Jazz pianist and composer
- Warner Jones, actor
- Vada Ward, actress, journalist, public relations practitioner, film writer, and speech coach
