= Vada Ward =

American actress, speech coach and counselor

Vada Roberts Ward (born 1917 or 1918) was an American actress, journalist, public relations practitioner, film writer, and speech coach.

== Early years ==
Ward was the daughter of Malcolm Geoffrey Ward and Sula De Walt Hile. She was born in 1917 or 1918, in St. Joseph, Missouri. Her father worked for a railroad, and the family moved to Centralia, Kansas, when he was transferred. She attended Manteca Union High School and Southwestern State Teachers College and was a 1939 graduate of the College of the Pacific, where she starred in Little Theatre plays, majored in dramatic art, and learned to play cello and piano.

== Career ==
Ward acted with road and stock theater companies in the Eastern United States for three years after she finished college, beginning with the Rochester Summer Theater in East Avon, New York. After that, she became a reporter for the Washington Times-Herald. In 1945, she became a civilian member of the U. S. Army's public relations department in Europe, after which she became assistant chief information officer of the Army theater special services in Europe. Following that work, she began writing for documentary films in New York City. She also wrote for the Stockton Record from 1939 through 1945, contributing a column about her life in Washington, D. C., and in New York.

By March 1947, Ward had begun working in the U. S. State Department's International Motion Picture Division. Her activities there included writing a commentary for a film about a trip that President Harry Truman made to Mexico and directing and writing a film about Cornell University's home economics program. Films made by the division were destined to be shown in foreign countries with translations into other languages.

Ward obtained a master's degree in speech and theater from Columbia University. After she had children, she left acting and became a teacher, initially in the University of Bridgeport's department of speech and theater. Following her husband's death, she went to Washington in 1971 and joined the faculty of American University (AU).

Her career went in a new direction in 1971 when AU referred Iran's ambassador to the United States to her for private coaching, which led to her counseling people (from a variety of professions other than acting) on how to overcome stage fright. Those she helped included a member of the United States House of Representatives, a newspaper columnist who became a television critic on national TV, a business executive who had to appear in televised Congressional hearings, a United States secretary of transportation, and a leader of a national political party.

In the late 1970s, NBC made regular use of Ward's training, sending personnel to her for sessions that typically ran for 21 hours in a two-week span. She said that most people have difficulty "making their public self fit their private self." She added that a person needs to reconcile the two selves, "finding out who they are, what they are, where they are — and then going public with it." Her techniques included getting the person to imagine that he or she was talking just to a friend or relative rather than to a large group or picturing oneself in a conversation at a campfire rather than in a TV studio.

== Personal life ==
Ward married Hamilton MacFadden on October 29, 1949, in Fairfield, Connecticut.
