= Nevada State Route 431 =

Highway in Nevada

State Route 431
- Mount Rose Highway
- SR 431 highlighted in red

Route information
- Maintained by NDOT
- Length: 24.413 mi (39.289 km)
- Existed: July 1, 1976–present
- History: SR 27 by 1941, became SR 431 in 1976

Major junctions
- West end: SR 28 in Incline Village
- I-580 / US 395 in Reno
- East end: US 395 Alt. / SR 341 in Reno

Location
- Country: United States
- State: Nevada
- County: Washoe

Highway system
- Nevada State Highway System; Interstate; US; State; Pre‑1976; Scenic
← SR 430	→ SR 439

State Route 431 (SR 431), commonly known as the Mount Rose Highway, is a 24.413-mile-long (39.289 km) highway in Washoe County, Nevada, that connects Incline Village at Lake Tahoe with Reno. The highway, a Nevada Scenic Byway, takes its name from Mount Rose, which lies just off the highway. Prior to 1976, the highway existed as State Route 27.

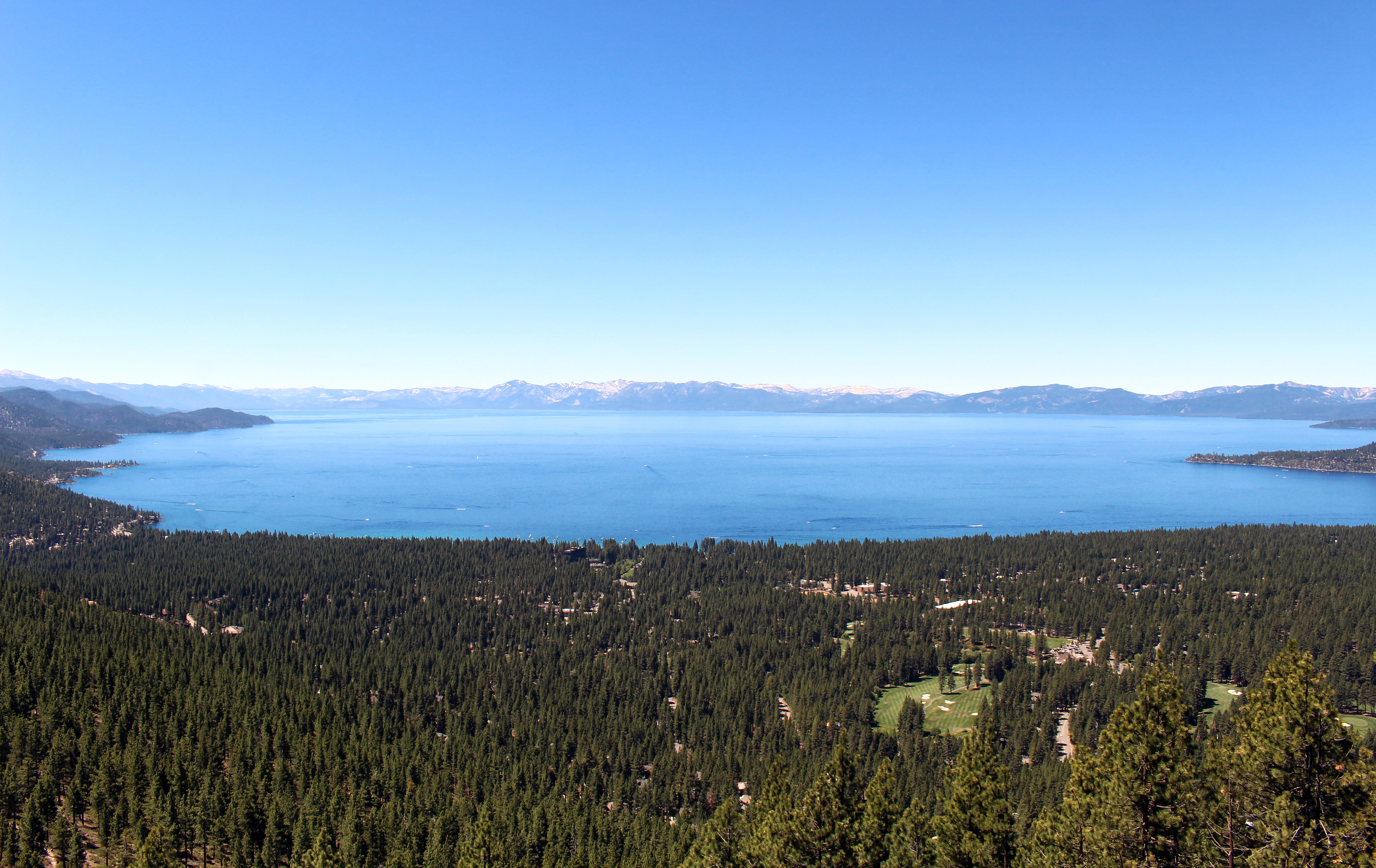
View of Lake Tahoe from scenic overlook at first major hairpin turn on State Route 431 above Incline Village as seen in 2020

== Route description ==
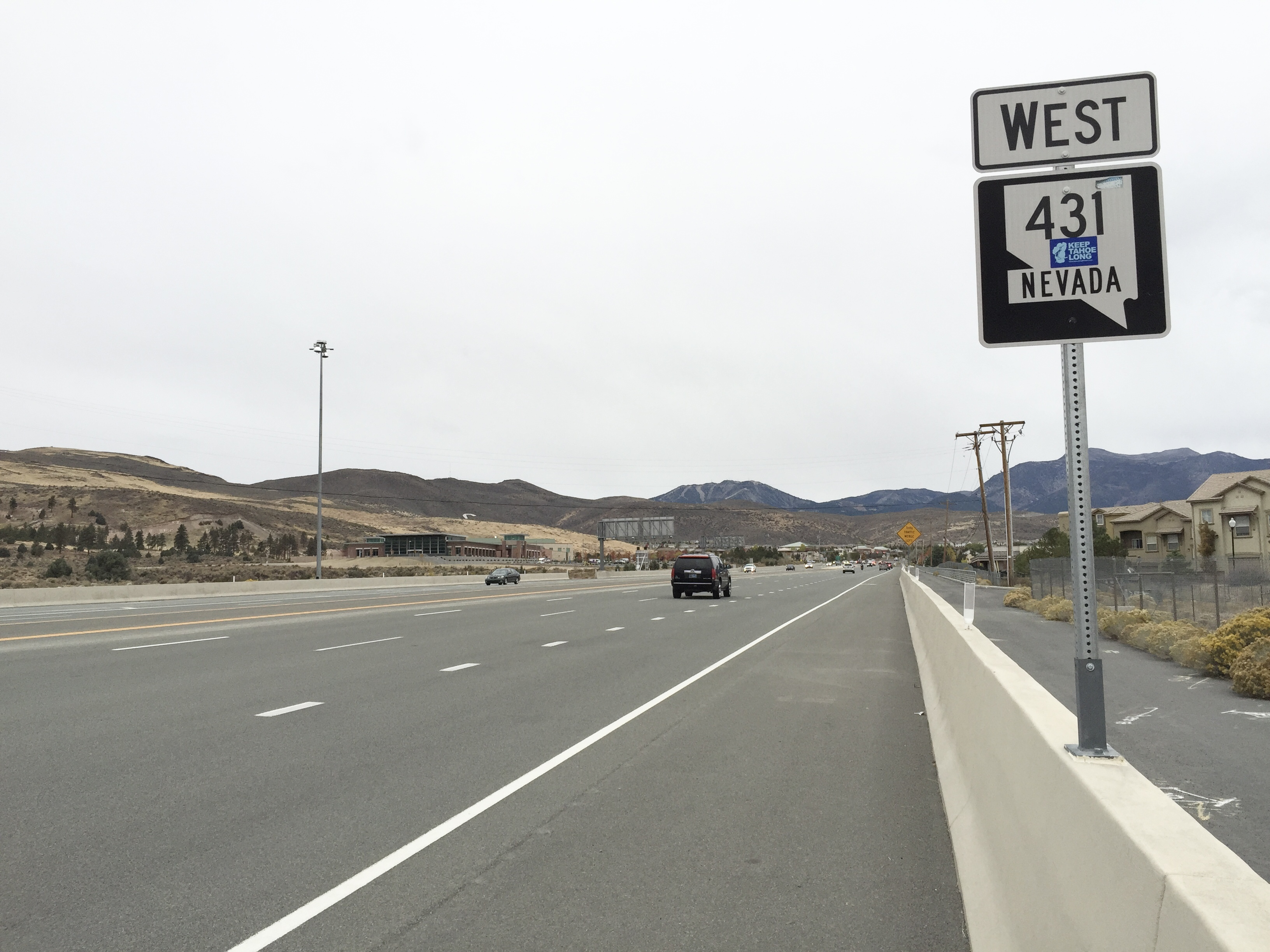
View from the east end of SR 431 looking westbound as seen in 2015

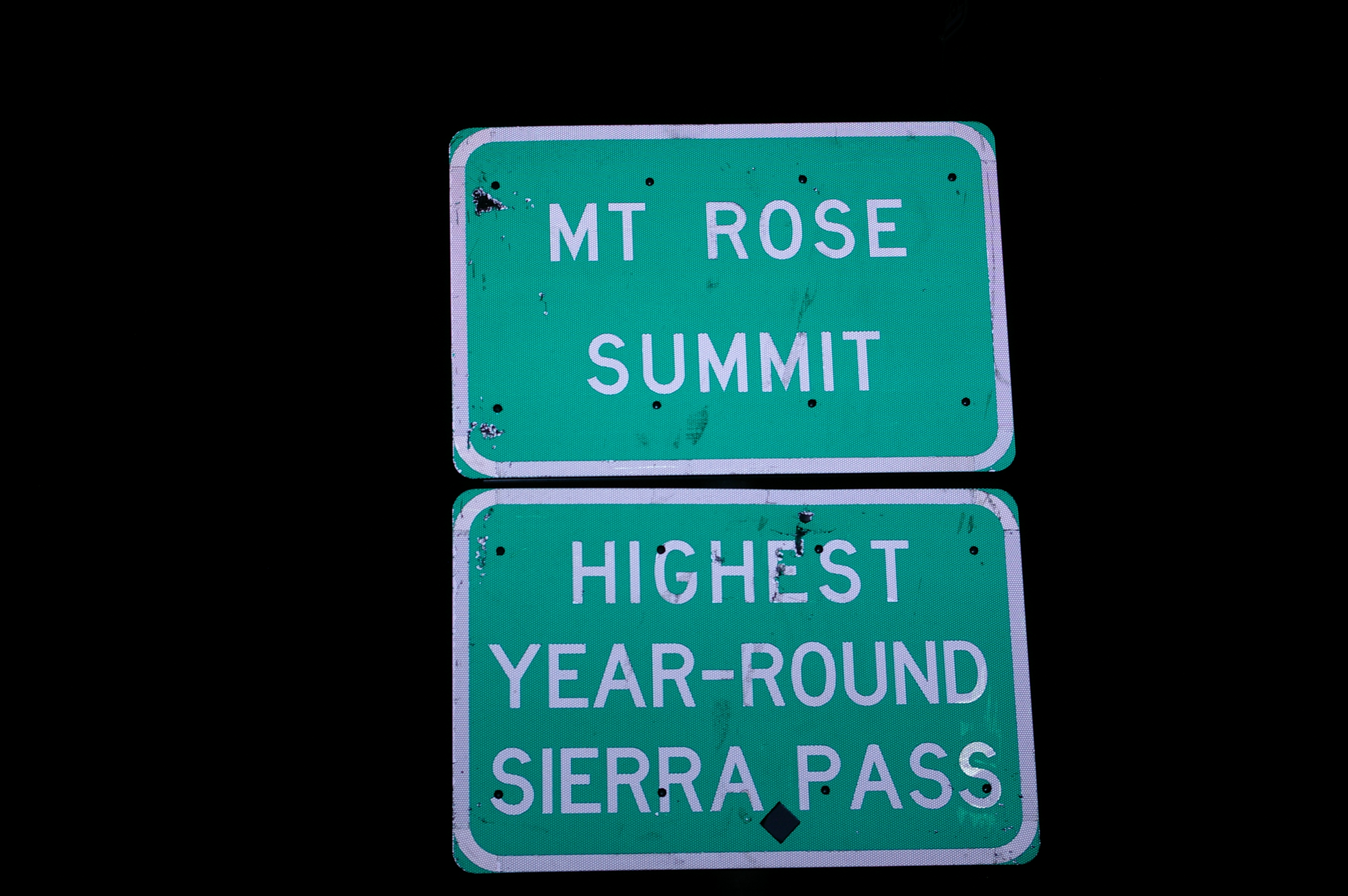
Sign at the Mount Rose Summit as seen in 2008

The highway begins along the northeast shore of Lake Tahoe in the city of Incline Village, at an intersection with SR 28. The highway scales the Carson Range, a spur range of the Sierra Nevada, until reaching a meadow that is used as an access for the Mount Rose Wilderness. Along the western ascent is a view area with directional markers pointing to several notable peaks in the Sierra Nevada range that surround Lake Tahoe. The highway crests the Carson Range at Mount Rose Summit. The Nevada Department of Transportation has claimed in several places this is the highest summit open year-round in the Sierra Nevada mountain range, 8,911 feet (2,716 m). Both the east and west approach to the summit feature hairpin curves.

On the eastern approach to the summit, the highway passes by the Mount Rose Ski Area and features overlooks with views of both Reno and the Washoe Valley. After several serpentine bends the highway arrives at an area of Reno called Galena. In Galena, the highway has a junction with Interstate 580 and US 395. It terminates at a junction with US 395 Alt. and SR 341, which continues towards Virginia City.

== History ==
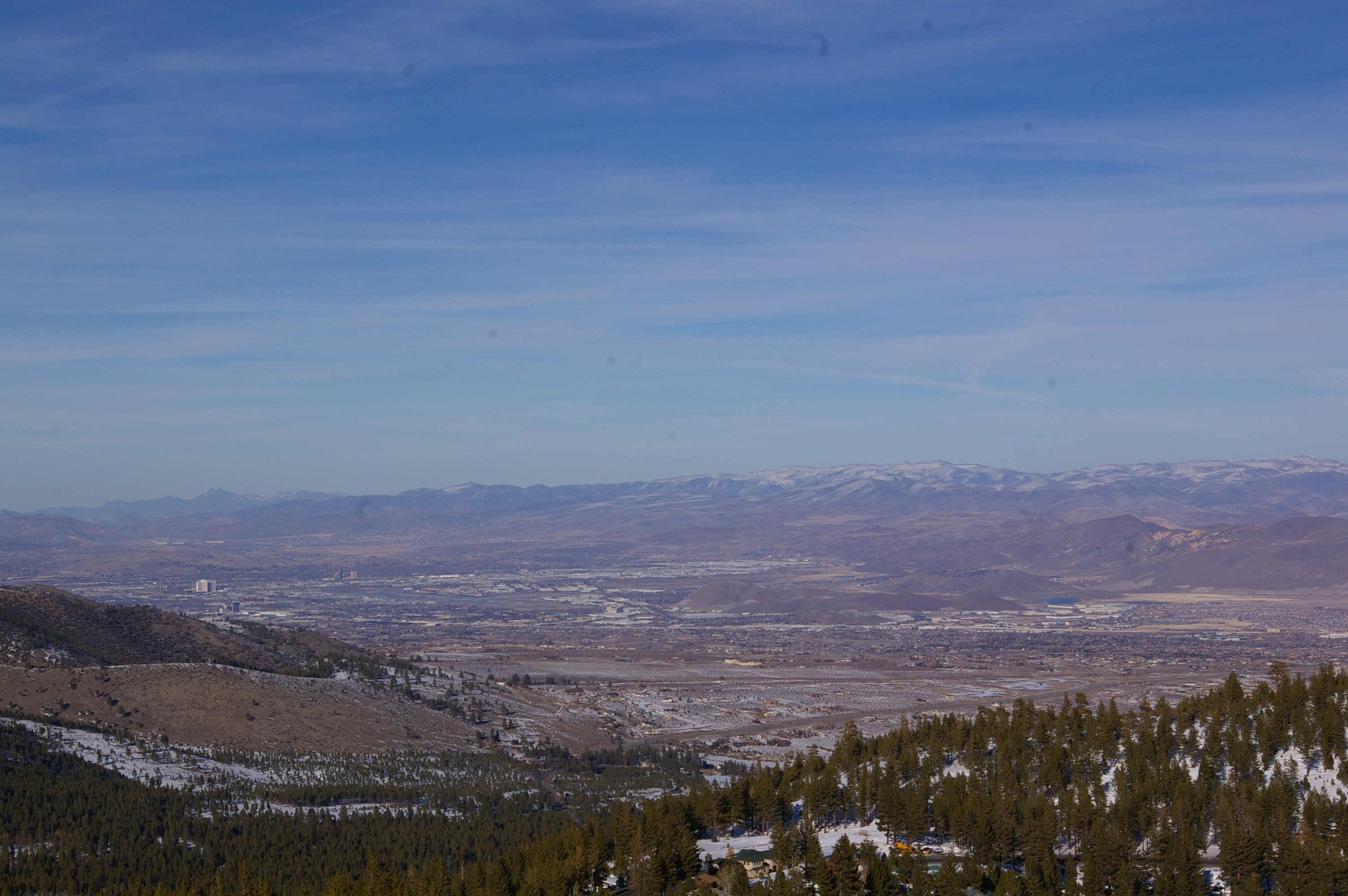
Reno as seen from the Mt. Rose Highway in 2008

The road has existed at least as far back as 1950 as an access to the ski areas of Mount Rose. At the time, it was just a dirt road only passable by automobile in the summer months.

Approximately 20 miles (32 km) of SR 431 was designated as the Mount Rose Nevada Scenic Byway by the Nevada Department of Transportation on June 27, 1996.

Rapid growth in the Reno area has put strain on the corridor served by the highway. This has prompted environmentalists to push for restrictions on future development along the corridor.

== Major intersections ==
The entire route is in Washoe County.

Location	mi	km	Destinations	Notes
Incline Village	0.000	0.000	SR 28 – Crystal Bay, Carson City	Western terminus
Incline Village	3	4.8	Country Club Drive	
Incline Village	8.06	12.97	View area – Lake Tahoe	
	9	14	Mount Rose Wilderness access	
	10	16	Mount Rose Ski Tahoe	
	11	18	Slide Mountain Road (SR 878 south) – Mount Rose East Bowl	Northern terminus of SR 878
	17	27	Joy Lake Road	
Reno	23	37	I-580 / US 395 – Carson City, Reno, Susanville	I-580 exit 24
Reno	24.413	39.289	US 395 Alt. (S. Virginia Street) – Reno, Washoe City	Eastern terminus; former SR 430/US 395
Reno	24.413	39.289	SR 341 south (Geiger Grade) – Virginia City	Continuation beyond eastern terminus
1.000 mi = 1.609 km; 1.000 km = 0.621 mi
