= Warner Jones =

American stage and television actor

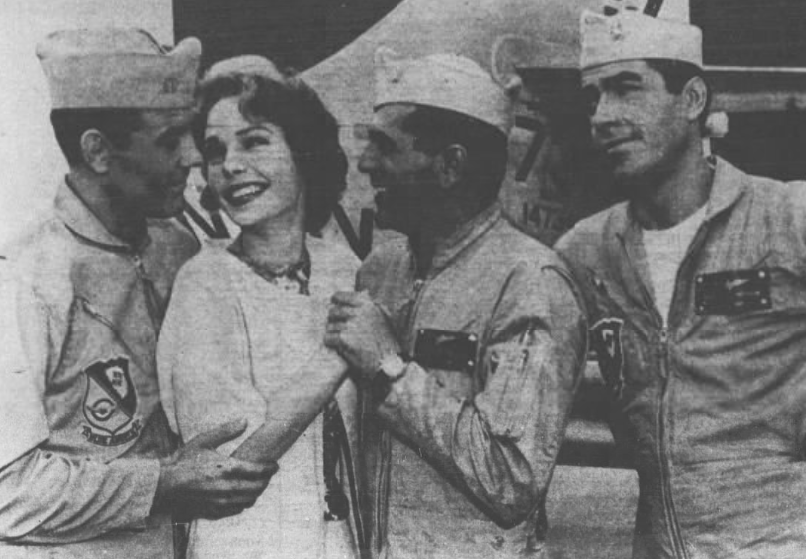
- Jones (left) with Judy Lewis, Don Gordon and Dennis Cross in The Blue Angels, 1961
- Born: December 17, 1928; Oakland, California, U.S.
- Died: December 23, 2010 (aged 82); Eureka, California, U.S.
- Education: College of the Pacific
- Occupations: Stage and television actor

Warner Jones (December 17, 1928 – December 23, 2010) was an American stage and television actor. He was known for playing Captain Wilbur Scott in the American aviation television series The Blue Angels.

== Life and career ==
Jones was born in Oakland, California, the son of Dorothy Jones-Robarts. He attended and graduated from the College of the Pacific. He began his screen career in 1958, appearing in the syndicated anthology television series Flight. During his screen career, he played a physician on a stage production at the Tulsa Municipal Theater in Tulsa, Oklahoma.

Later in his career, in 1960, Jones starred as Captain Wilbur Scott in the syndicated aviation television series The Blue Angels, starring along with Dennis Cross, Morgan Jones, Michael Galloway and Don Gordon. After the series ended in 1961, he played the recurring role of desk clerk Harry McGill in the CBS comedy drama television series Window on Main Street. He guest-starred in television programs including Mr. Lucky and The Rifleman.

Jones retired from acting in 1962, last appearing in the CBS sitcom television series The Andy Griffith Show.

== Death ==
Jones died on December 23, 2010, in Eureka, California, at the age of 82.
