= Eilley Bowers =

19th-century Nevada pioneer

Alison "Eilley" Oram Bowers
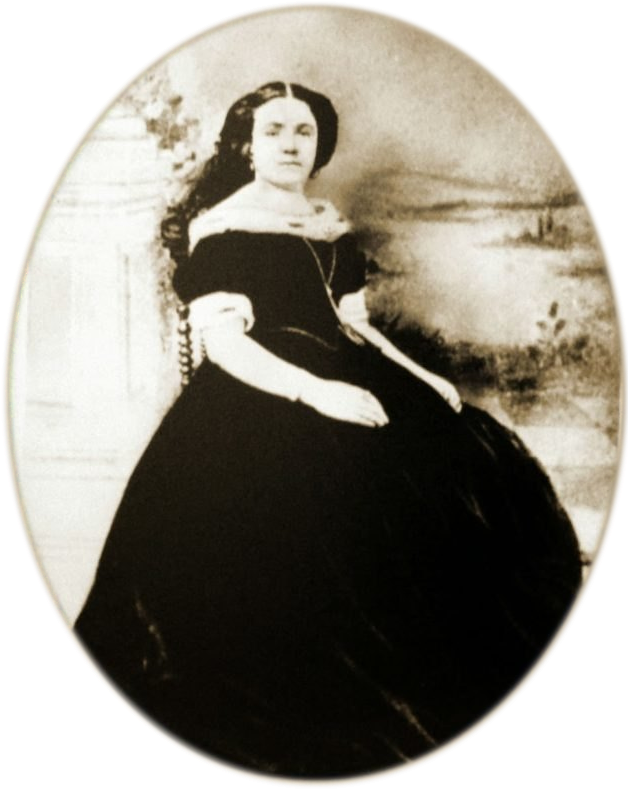
- Born: Alison Oram; September 6, 1826; Forfar, Scotland
- Died: October 27, 1903 (aged 77); Oakland, California, USA
- Known for: miner, socialite, fortune-teller
- Spouse(s): Stephen Hunter (1842–1850); Alexander Cowan (1853–1860); Lemuel Sanford "Sandy" Bowers (1859–1868)

Alison "Eilley" Oram Bowers (September 6, 1826 – October 27, 1903) was a Scottish American woman who was, in her time, one of the richest women in the United States, and owner of the Bowers Mansion, one of the largest houses in the western United States. A farmer's daughter, Bowers married as a teenager, and her husband converted to Mormonism before the couple immigrated to the United States. After briefly living in Nauvoo, Illinois, she became an early Nevada pioneer, farmer and miner, and was made a millionaire by the Comstock Lode mining boom. Married and divorced two times, she married a third time and became a mother of three children but outlived them all.

Her first two children died in infancy; then her husband; and the third child a few years after. With the collapse of the Nevada mining economy, Eilley Bowers became bankrupt and destitute. Eilley reinvented herself as "The Famous Washoe Seeress", a professional scryer and fortune-teller in Nevada and California. She died penniless in a care home in Oakland, California.

== Early life ==
Alison Oram commonly called Eilley, was born on September 6, 1826, in Forfar, Scotland. Her only brother, John, was born in 1821, and it appears that her father's work forced them to move frequently. John was born in Dunfermline and at some point during their childhood, they moved eighty miles southwest of Forfar to Clackmannan. It was here that she married Stephen Hunter in the Church of Scotland at the age of fifteen. Stephen soon met some Mormon missionaries and became a believer. He was baptized into the Church of Jesus Christ of Latter Day Saints and agreed to immigrate to America. Eilley never converted but traveled with her husband. They sailed for America on January 29, 1849. By the time the Hunters reached Salt Lake City, the strain on their marriage was evident. After eight years of marriage, Bowers and Stephen separated in early 1850.

== Remarriage and settlement in Nevada ==
In 1853, Bowers married farmer Alexander Cowan. Two years later the couple joined a mission to Mormon Station, near the western edge of Utah Territory. They brought with them Alexander's 12-year-old nephew who had recently been orphaned by the death of Alexander's sister. The following year, the mission relocated to Washoe Valley in a settlement they named Franktown. The Cowans purchased 320 acres (130 ha) of land for $100 (approximately equivalent to $3,500 in 2025). The existing ranch contained a dwelling house and coral. They stayed for two seasons.

During the crisis of the Utah War in 1857, Brigham Young recalled Mormon colonists from the western areas of the proposed State of Deseret to the core area of Mormon settlement south of the Great Salt Lake. Alexander heeded the call, leaving his wife and son in Western Utah. With Alexander gone, Bowers and Robert left the abandoned settlement of Franktown for a small mining camp called Johntown in Gold Canyon near present-day Virginia City, Nevada. Bowers opened a boardinghouse and began taking care of the miners. When the threat of war passed, Alexander returned to Western Utah and settled in Johntown, but he did not wish to pursue the life of a Washoe miner. In the fall of 1858 he returned to Salt Lake City where he remained a prominent member of the Church of Jesus Christ of Latter-day Saints. Bowers and Robert remained in Johntown.

=== Gold Hill and the Comstock Lode ===
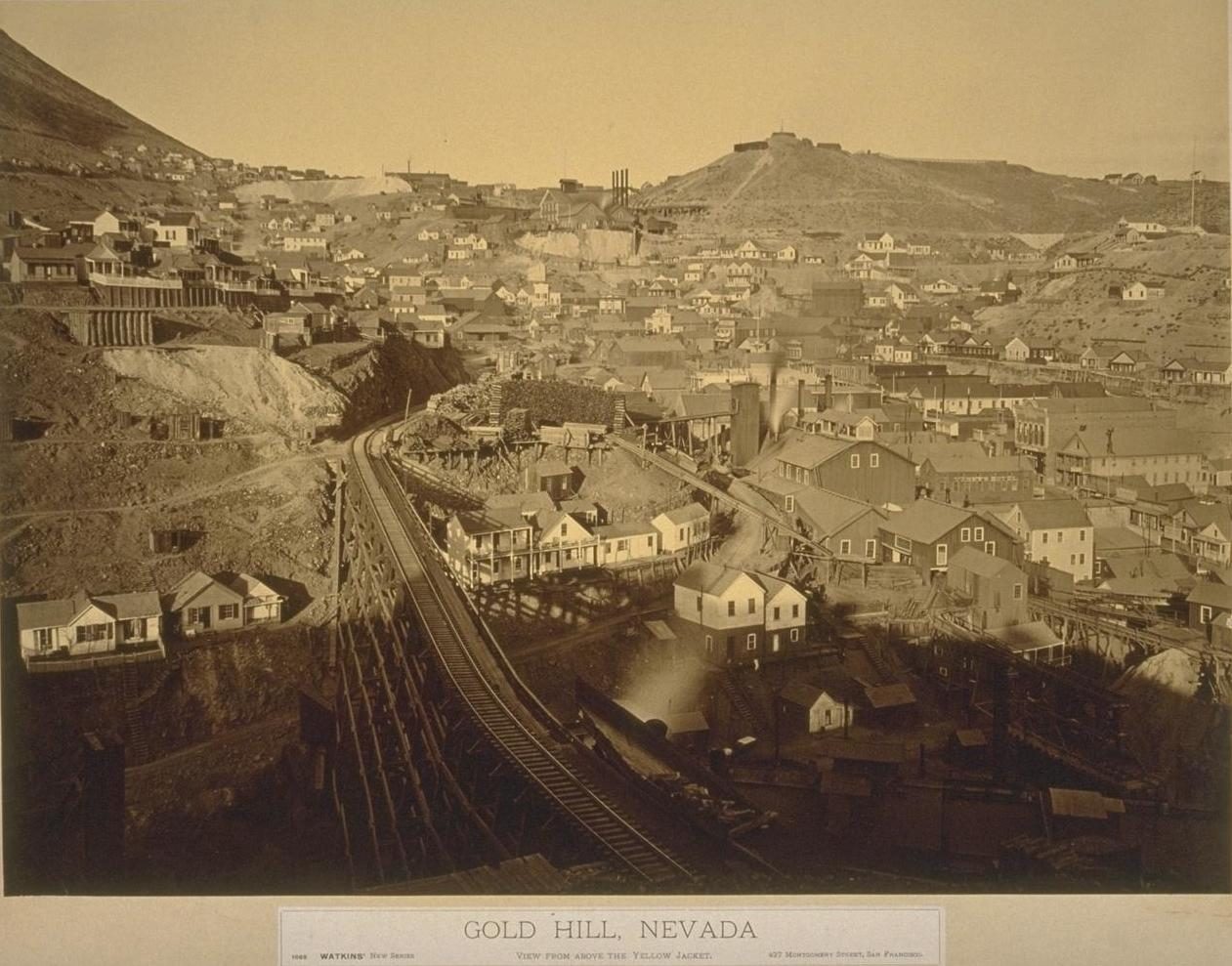
Gold Hill in the 1870s

As prospectors began entering the area in large numbers, they soon settled in a new town they named Gold Hill. Bowers opened a new boardinghouse, but she was also buying and selling mining claims. At this time she was also known to engage in fortune-telling using a traditional Scottish "peep stone" she had brought from Forfar. (Note: Although frowned on by most Christian denominations, scrying using stones was an accepted practice in the Mormon movement in the 19th century; see also Seer stone (Latter Day Saints).) Henry de Groot recorded that on his arrival in August 1859:

Mrs Ellen Cowan was living at Gold Hill in a very rude and comfortless sort of abode. She did the washing for the miners, a business that paid well at that day, and had gathered not a little gear prior to her marriage with Sandy.

Lemuel Sanford (Sandy) Bowers was one of the town's new arrivals. Sandy was a Missouri muleskinner (teamster), born in Madison County, Illinois on February 24, 1833. Sandy owned many mining claims, but his most productive was a ten-foot strip being part of the Little Gold Hill Mines. James Rogers owned the adjoining ten-foot strip which he sold to Bowers for $100.

On August 9, 1859, Eilley and Sandy joined their mining claims and lives when they were married in Gold Hill. In order to settle the land in Washoe Valley, Bowers officially divorced Alexander Cowan on June 4, 1860. As a settlement, she received half of the 320-acre farm they had owned in the Washoe Valley.

As the area boomed following the discovery of the Comstock Lode, the Bowers claim proved to hold one of the richest seams of silver ore in what would become Nevada, and because their claim was close to the surface, it was easily extracted without initial capital investment. The Bowers Mining Company quickly made Eilley and Sandy very wealthy.

=== European tour and the Bowers Mansion ===
On June 28, 1860 Eilley Bowers gave birth to a son, John Jasper Bowers, who died on August 27, 1860. On June 16, 1861 she gave birth to a daughter, Theresa Fortunatas Bowers, who died on September 17, 1861. With money to be had, the couple began to plan a grand mansion on the old Cowan Ranch in Washoe Valley. While the house was being built, the couple traveled through Europe to explore the old country and purchase furniture for the new house.

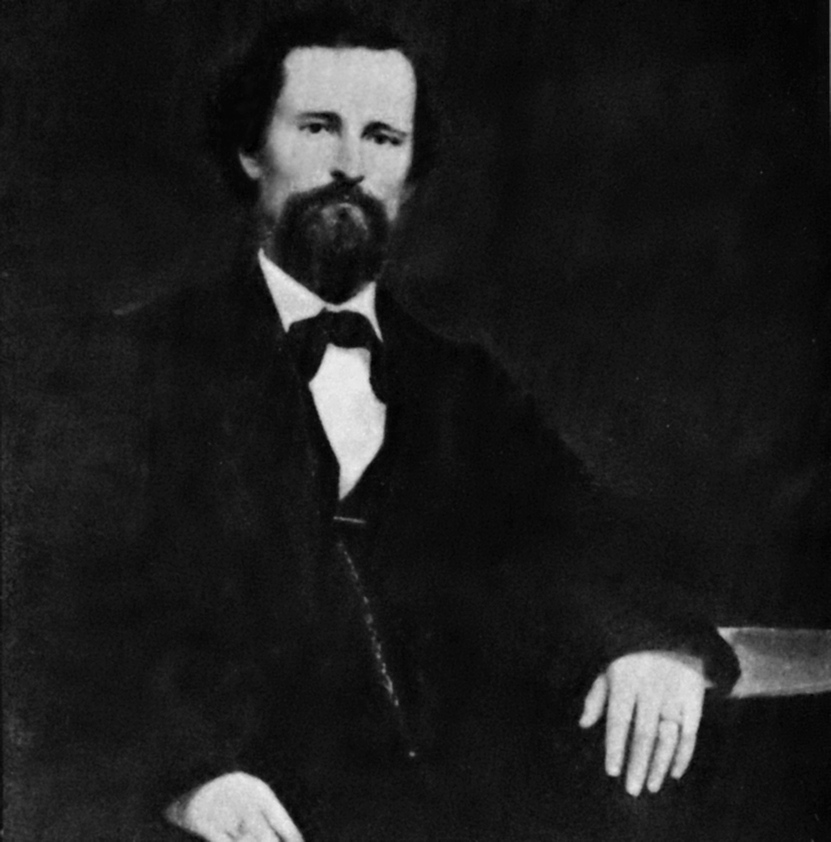
Lemuel Sanford "Sandy" Bowers

Shortly before their departure, the couple hosted a banquet at the International Hotel in Virginia City, to which the entire town was invited, and which included free champagne. After traveling to California, the Bowers sailed from San Francisco for England on May 2, 1862, aboard the steamer Golden Gate. The couple visited Eilley's family in Scotland and traveled through Europe while purchasing large quantities of furniture.

The couple returned to Nevada in March 1863, accompanied by a baby girl, named Margaret Persia Bowers. The Bowers never divulged where they had acquired the child. Some contemporary sources claimed she was born on their European crossing to an unwed mother who died during childbirth.

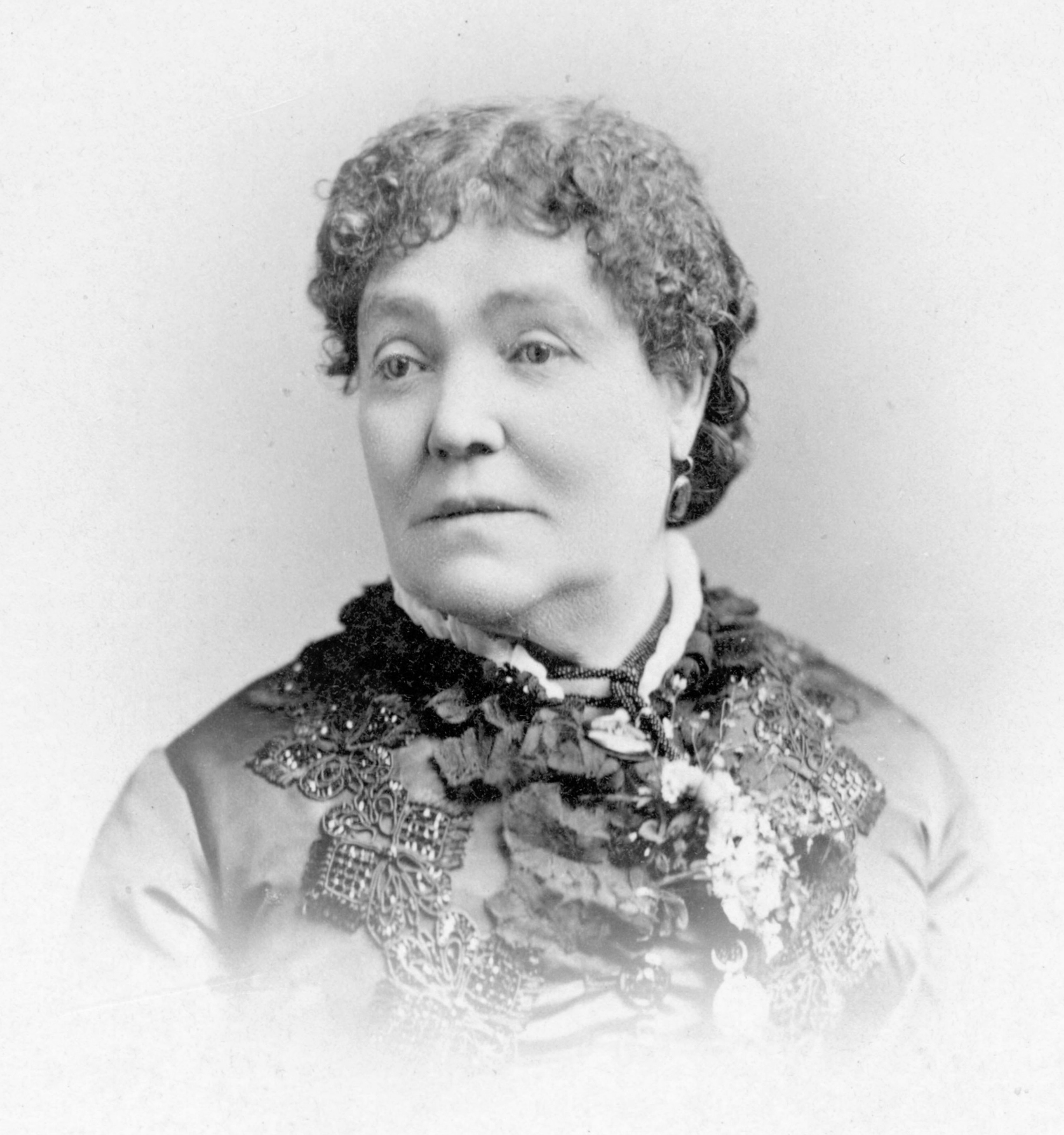
Eilley Bowers c.1863

The Bowers Mansion was one of the most expensive buildings built in the western United States at the time. Designed by J. Neely Johnson, the former Governor of California, The two-story dressed granite stone mansion consisted of 16 rooms constructed with Jeffery Pine and Douglas fir. The main floor included a library, guest room, reception room, formal parlor and adjoining smoking room, dining room, and kitchen. Four hand-crafted carrara marble fireplaces warmed the downstairs room. A plaster of Paris frieze border decorated the ceilings, moldings and medallions above the chandeliers. The main entrance hall opened to a turned mahogany handrail and balcony, which led to the upstairs where Eilley, Sandy, and Persia each had a suite of rooms including a bedroom and sitting room. Expensive toys and fancy dolls filled Persia's playroom. The extra upstairs room housed a hand-sculptured billiard table used for the enjoyment and entertainment of their guests. Kerosene lanterns and candles lighted the beautiful mansion that was truly unlike any other in the West.

== Economic hardship ==
The rich silver of the Comstock Lode began to play out in 1863 resulting in a deepening depression throughout 1864. Sandy moved back to Gold Hill to help save the mine. With health failing, he attempted to sell or lease most of the Bowers mining operation in the spring of 1868. At the age of 35, Sandy died of "inflammation of the lungs" on April 21, 1868, at his Gold Hill residence. He was buried on the hill behind his Mansion.

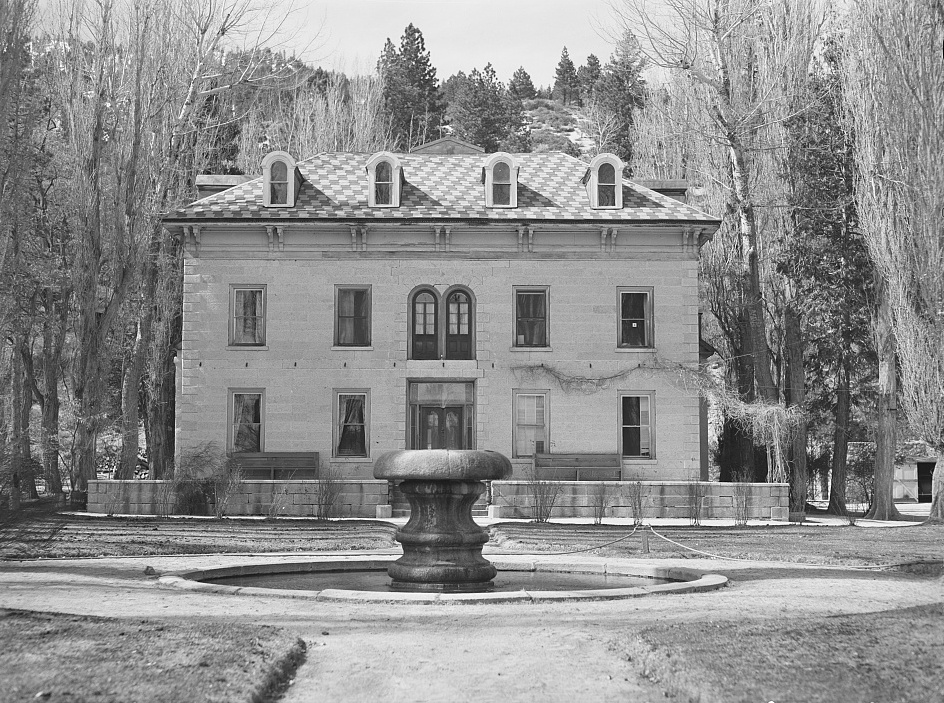
The Bowers Mansion in 1940

In 1873, Virginia City recovered with a new strike bringing wealth back to the region. Eilley Bowers opened the Bowers Mansion to the public as a resort. The grounds were advertised as being beneficial to health, while dances and social events were held in the mansion. Bowers improved the mansion and grounds by adding a dance hall and offering the upstairs suits for family use. With the extension of the railroad which now connected Virginia City to the young town of Reno and the Transcontinental Railroad, Bowers Mansion became a prime destination for grand excursions. Eilley spent many weekends hosting extravagant picnics. The guests bathed in the fishponds, swung under the trees, waltzed on the dance floor and generally just had a fine old time. For the next few years, Bowers Mansion was filled with music and laughter.

Meanwhile, Persia Bowers was sent to live with friends in Reno allowing her to go to school and learn music. On July 14, 1874 Persia died of what may have been a ruptured appendix. She was buried behind the mansion with her father.

The resort brought in some money, but Bowers was still in debt. The Bowers Mine was sold to pay off creditors, and she entered into negotiations with the newly created State of Nevada for the state to purchase the mansion as a psychiatric hospital. Unfortunately for Bowers, the deal fell through, and she was obliged to begin to sell her possessions to settle debts.

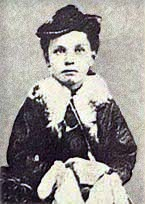
Margaret Persia Bowers c. 1872

Bowers made one final attempt to save the mansion when she hired construction crews and began renovating the mansion. This time she changed the entire structure by adding a third floor. The $8,000 expansion included 14 rooms, including 10 over the main house and two over each wing. However, this only increased her debt.

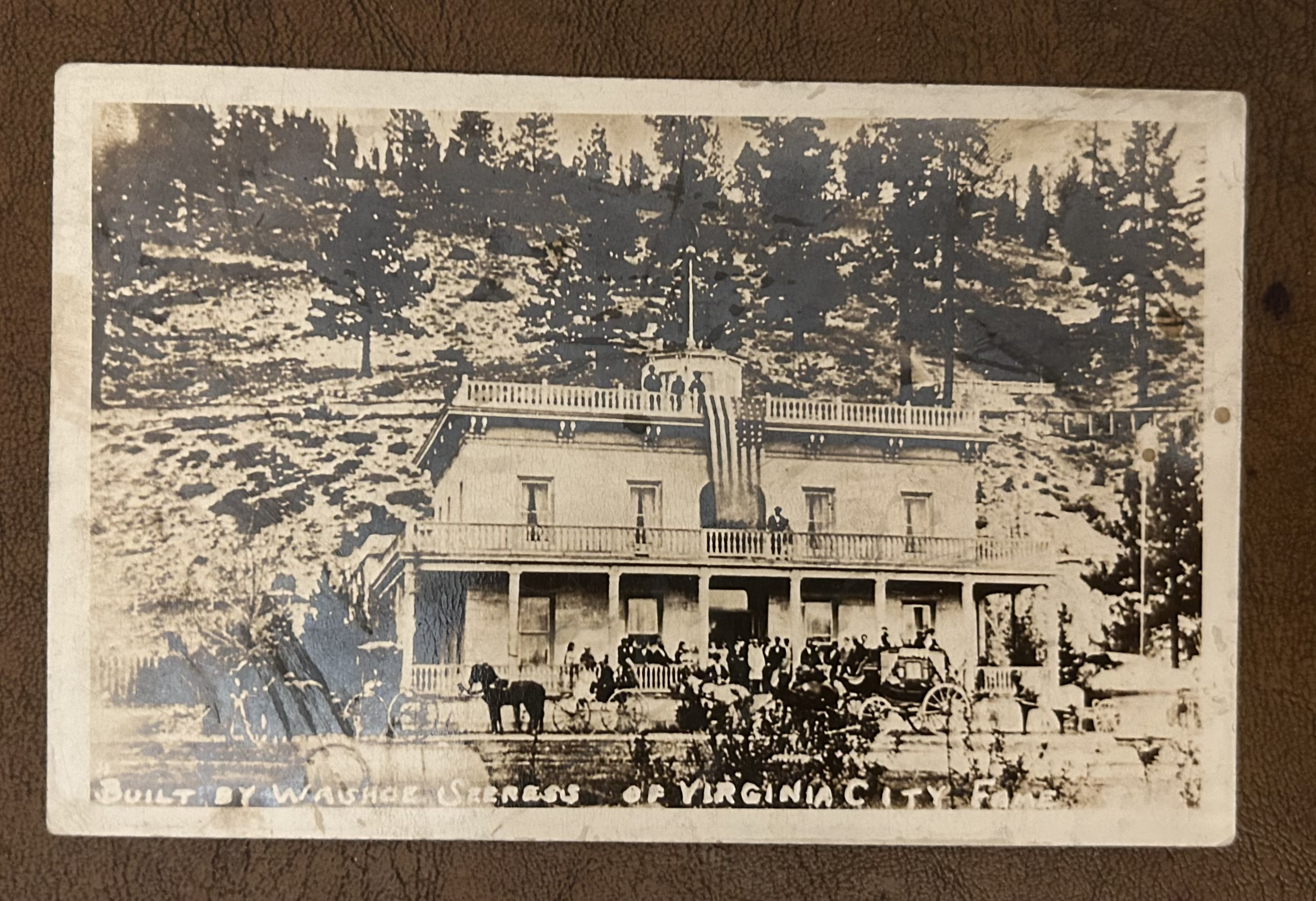
Photograph Captioned "Built by Washoe Seeress of Virginia City Fame"

In April 1876, the District Court of Washoe County finally ruled against Bowers and in favor of her creditors in the sum of $13,622.17 (equivalent to $411,900 in 2025). On May 3, 1876, at 1:00 p.m. the courts auctioned off the remaindered of her properties in front of the Washoe county Courthouse. Eight years after Sandy's death, Eilley lost everything to the founder of Reno, Myron C. Lake for $10,000.

=== Seeress of Washoe ===
Bankrupt and with no remaining family in the United States, Bowers set herself up as a fortune-teller using her peep stone, billing herself as "Mrs L. S. Bowers, The Famous Washoe Seeress". She enjoyed some success with her predictions, successfully predicting, among other things, the fire which destroyed much of Virginia City in 1875. Due to the continued economic decline in northern Nevada following the collapse of the mining industry, in the 1880s she moved to San Francisco, where she continued to practice as a scryer.

=== Destitution ===
In the late 19th century, Bowers returned to Nevada. Her hearing had diminished significantly, and she was forced to give up the scrying business as she was unable to hear the requests of her clients. She launched a claim against the government asking for financial assistance in return for the $14,000 she and Sandy Bowers had donated to support the Union cause in the Civil War and to finance the 1860 Paiute War, but was ignored. Destitute, she was placed in the Washoe County poorhouse, and became the subject of a protracted legal dispute between the governments of Nevada and California over who was to pay for her care. In August 1901 it was agreed that California would take responsibility for her welfare, and she was summarily put on a San Francisco-bound train by Reno officials with $30 cash. For the last two years of her life she lived at the King's Daughters Home in Oakland, dying on October 27, 1903. Her ashes were returned to Nevada and buried alongside Sandy and Margaret at the Bowers Mansion.

== Legacy ==
Eilley Bowers continues to be one of the most famous of 19th-century female pioneers, and a major figure in the early history of Nevada. In one writer's words, she "is one of the most researched, written and talked about women in Nevada history."

Following its sale at auction following foreclosure, the Bowers Mansion was abandoned. Eventually purchased by Reno saloon owner Henry Riter, it was renovated and reopened as a resort in 1903. The hot springs were remodeled to feed warm swimming pools, and a spur was built from the Virginia and Truckee Railroad to serve the property. It continued to operate as a resort until 1946. It is now considered the finest example of the mansion houses built by the millionaire beneficiaries of the Comstock boom, is listed on the National Register of Historic Places, and is administered by the Washoe County Parks Department.
