= Dennis Cross =

American film and television actor (1924-1991)

- Cross in Tales of Wells Fargo, 1960
- Born: December 17, 1924; Whitefish, Montana, U.S.
- Died: April 6, 1991 (aged 66); Los Angeles, California, U.S.
- Occupations: Film and television actor
- Years active: 1948–1976
- Children: 7; including Randy Cross

Dennis Cross (December 17, 1924 – April 6, 1991) was an American film and television actor. He was known for playing the role of Commander Arthur "Tex" Richards in the American syndicated television series The Blue Angels.

== Life and career ==
Cross was born in Whitefish, Montana. At the age of 17, he served in the United States Marine Corps, fighting against the Japanese at Guadalcanal. He then studied acting, attending Actors' Laboratory Theatre in Hollywood, California, on the G.I. Bill. Cross began his acting career in 1948. He and his family moved from New York to California in 1955.

Later in his career, Cross appeared in the stage play The Trip to Bountiful, which was televised on The Philco Television Playhouse. He played Harrison Ticket Man. He worked as an assistant manager in San Fernando Valley, California. Cross then moved to California, where he appeared in six episodes of the western television series The Rifleman. He also played the lead role of Commander Arthur "Tex" Richards in the syndicated television series The Blue Angels from 1960 to 1961.

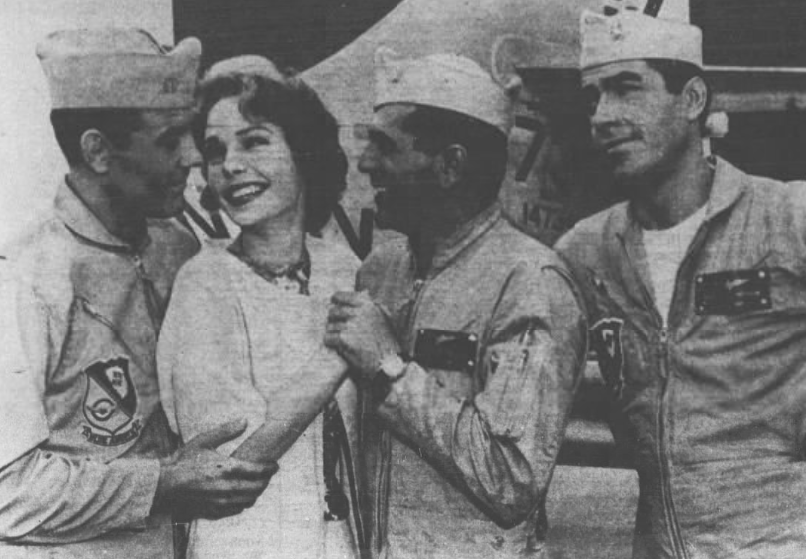
Cross (right) with Warner Jones, Judy Lewis, Don Gordon in The Blue Angels, 1961

Cross retired from acting in 1976, his last credit being on the television program The Waltons. After retiring from acting, he was a vice president at the Doctors Insurance Company in Santa Monica, California.

== Death ==
Cross died on April 6, 1991 in Los Angeles, California, at the age of 66.
