= Washoe Lake =

Lake in Washoe County, Nevada, United States

- ćóʔyaʔ dáʔaw (Washo); Sainunədu (Northern Paiute)
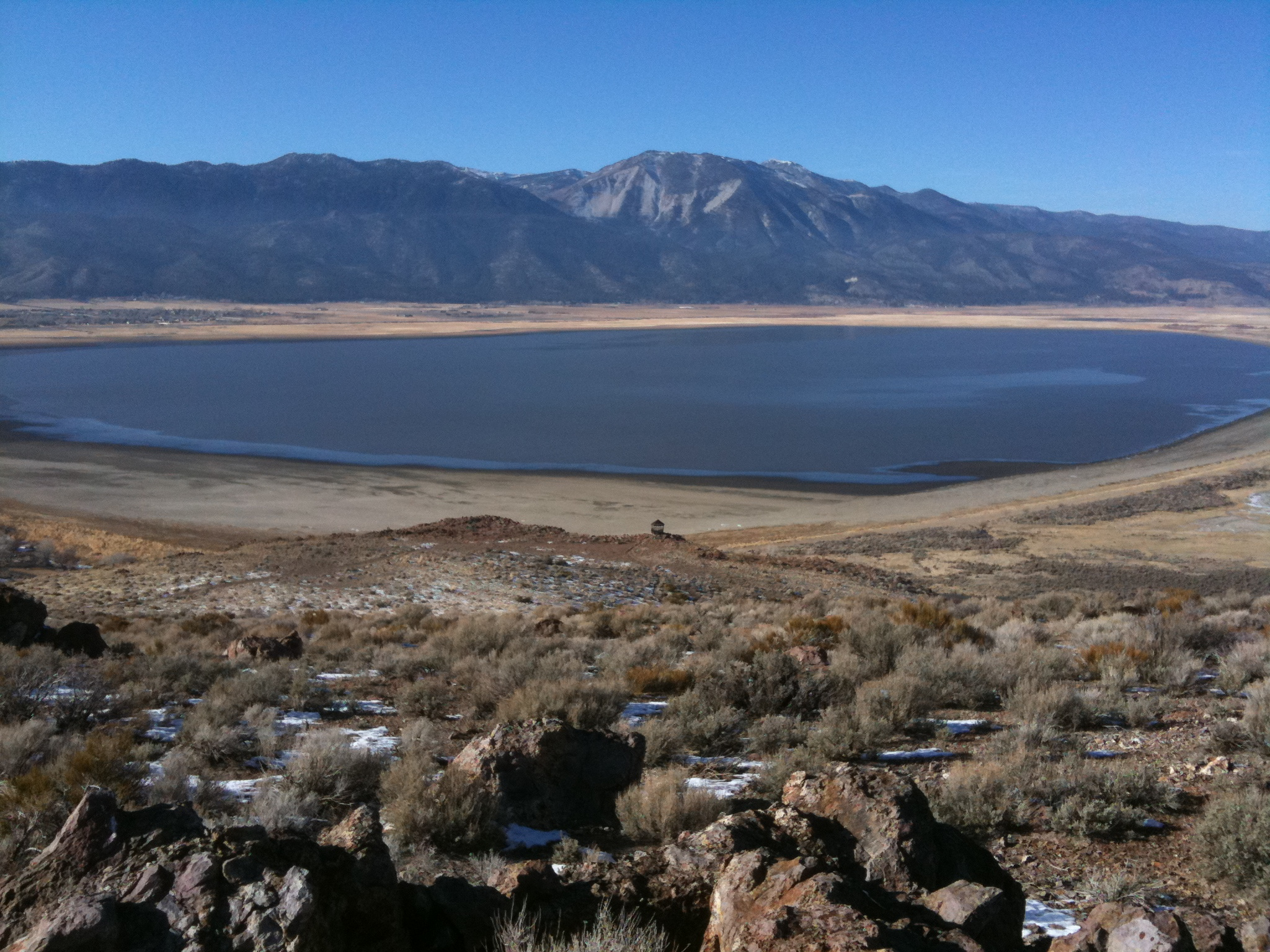
- Washoe Lake, with Slide Mt. and the Carson Range in the background.

- Location in Nevada
- Location: Washoe County, Nevada
- Coordinates: 39°16′06″N 119°48′03″W
- Primary inflows: several small streams
- Primary outflows: Steamboat Creek
- Basin countries: United States
- Max. depth: 12 ft (3.7 m)
- Surface elevation: 5,029 ft (1,533 m)

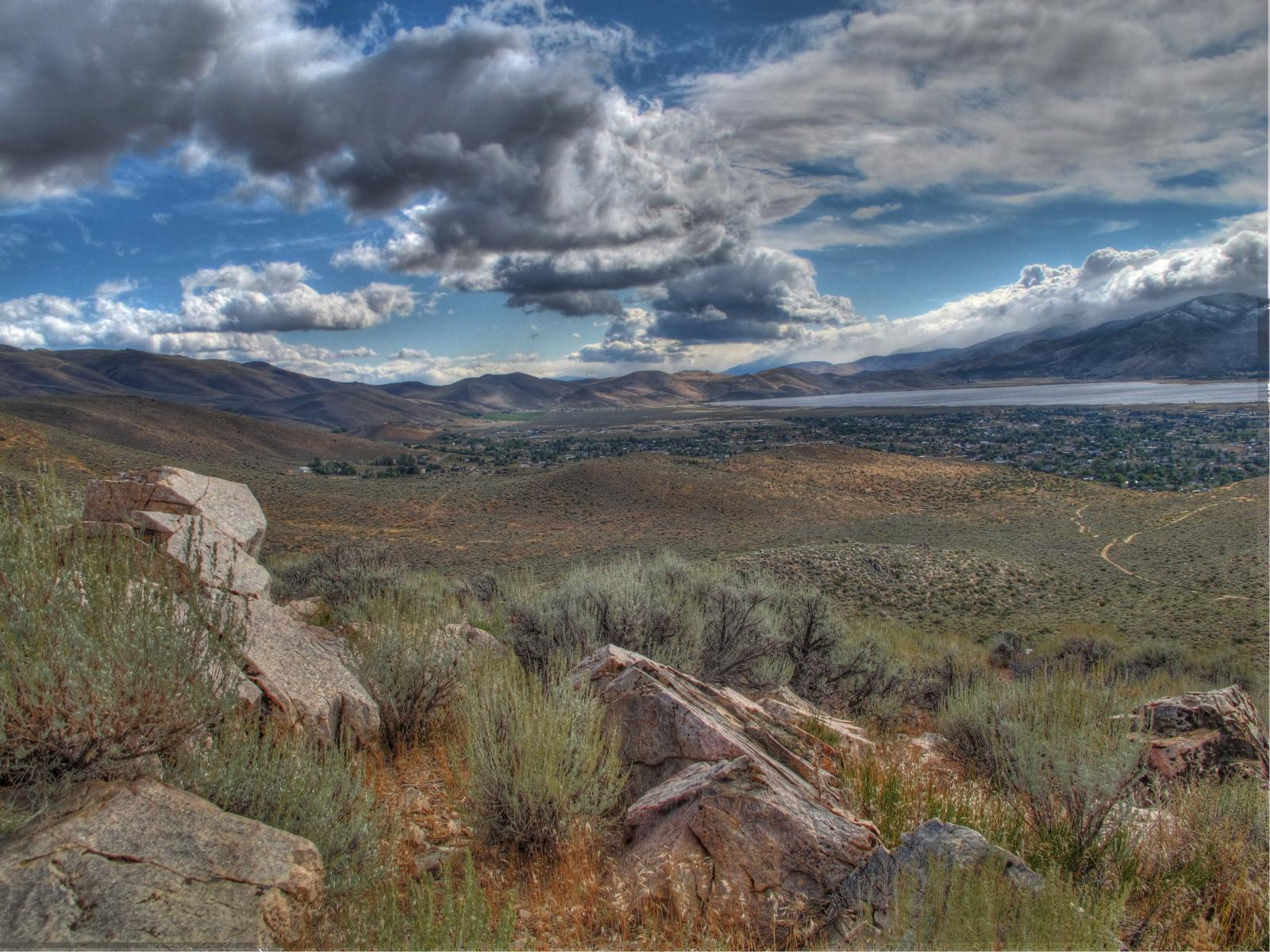
Washoe Lake and storm, 2011

Washoe Lake (Washo: ćóʔyaʔ dáʔaw) is a lake located near Carson City in the Washoe Valley of Washoe County, Nevada. It is a very shallow lake with a surface area that can vary greatly from year to year. Washoe Lake State Park sits on the lake's southeastern shore.

Washoe Lake is a eutrophic, shallow lake between Reno and Carson City and just east of the much larger Lake Tahoe. The lake reaches a maximum depth of just 12 feet (3.7 m). The shallowness and the high winds make the lake very turbid. Extensive droughts in the past have caused the lake to dry up entirely, most recently in 1992, 1994, and 2004.

Washoe Lake is a warm water fishery and provides a habitat for non-native Sacramento perch, white bass, channel catfish, brown bullhead, and carp. The lake has been stocked by the Nevada Division of Wildlife since 2004 when Washoe Lake last dried up. Two boat launches are on the eastern shore of the lake within Washoe Lake State Park.

The lake provides habitat for a variety of birds. There are hundreds of migratory and resident species in Washoe Lake State Park. Pelicans, night and great blue herons can be found on the waters of the lake.

== Watershed ==
Washoe Lake is fed by several small streams which issue from the Carson Range to the west as well as ephemeral streams which flow from the Virginia Range to the east. At its northern end, Washoe Lake narrows and connects to Little Washoe Lake, at whose northernmost end issues Steamboat Creek, which runs north to the Truckee River.

From the Carson Range, Washoe Lake receives (from south to north) Franktown Creek, Ophir Creek, Davis Creek and Winters Creek. Steamboat Creek receives Browns and Galena Creeks in Pleasant Valley, Nevada, and then runs north to meet the Truckee River on the eastern outskirts of Reno, Nevada. Much of the water from the Steamboat Creek/Washoe Lake watershed is diverted for irrigation use.

== Washoe Zephyr ==
Like the rest of the region in the lee of the Sierra Nevada, the area around Washoe Lake is subject to the Washoe Zephyr, a sometimes daily gusty wind that generally occurs during the summer.

Mark Twain wrote:

"A Washoe wind is by no means a trifling matter. It blows flimsy houses down, lifts shingle roofs occasionally, rolls up tin ones like sheet music, now and then blows a stage-coach over and spills the passengers; and tradition says the reason there are so many bald people there is that the wind blows the hair off their heads while they are looking skyward after their hats.

The same high wind speeds have remained to this day and are capable of overturning commercial vehicles traveling along Interstate 580/U.S. Highway 395, which runs along the eastern base of the Sierra Nevada, and traverses the western shore of Washoe Lake.

== Activities ==
Aerial view of the lake

Washoe Lake is popular with windsurfers, kiteboarders, and (lake level permitting) small boat sailors.
