= Washoe City, Nevada =

Ghost town in Washoe County, Nevada, United States

Washoe Valley, Nevada
- Ghost town
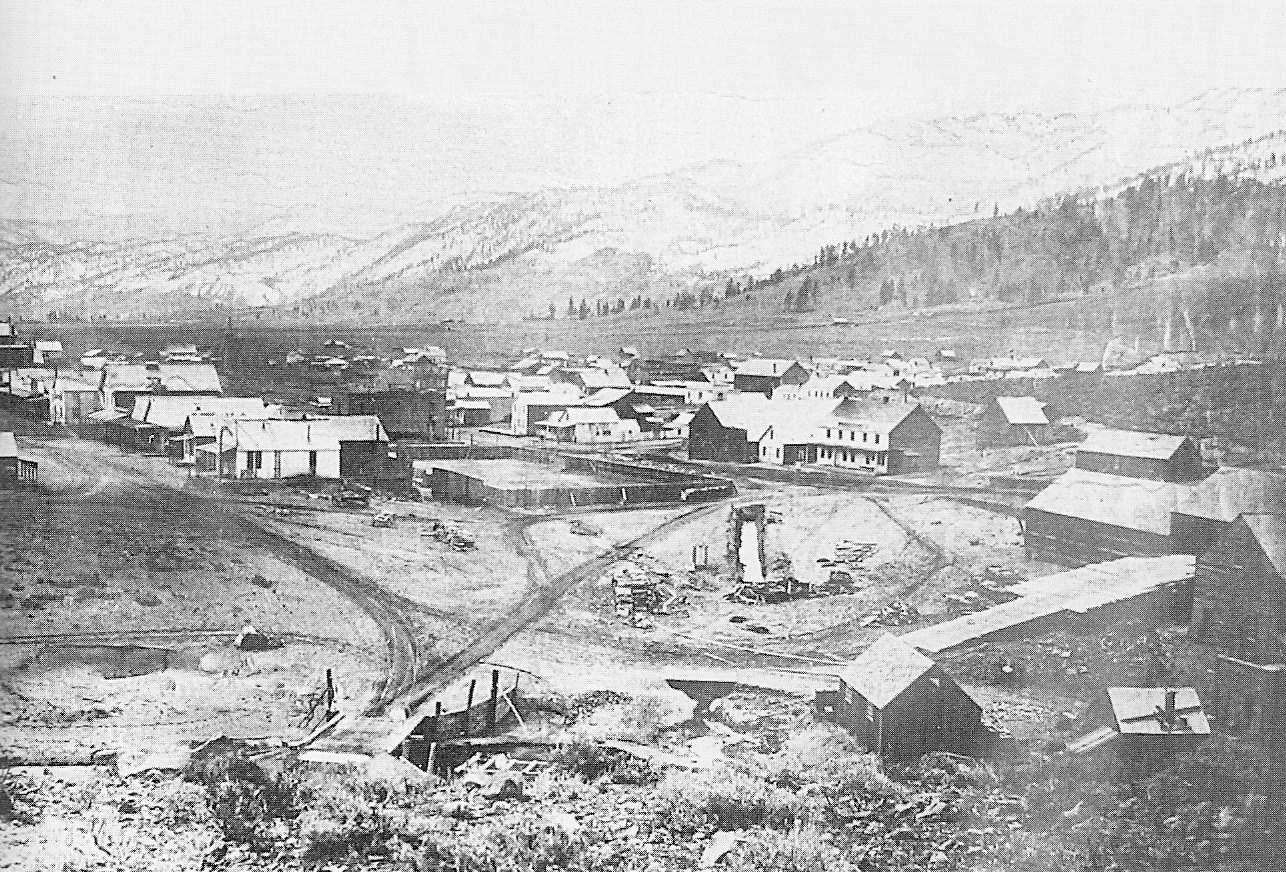
- Washoe City, 1860s

- Location within the state of Nevada Washoe Valley (the United States)
- Coordinates: 39°19′42.1″N 119°48′14.6″W
- Country: United States
- State: Nevada
- County: Washoe
- Elevation: 5,062 ft (1,543 m)

Population (2010)
  - Total: 0
- Time zone: UTC-8 (Pacific (PST))
  - Summer (DST): UTC-7 (PDT)
- GNIS feature ID: 861904

Washoe City is a ghost town in on the north shore of Washoe Lake in Washoe County, Nevada, United States. Nearby there is a new community called New Washoe City.

== History ==
Old Washoe City was founded in 1860 as a lumber camp for Virginia City. With unlimited water available from Washoe Lake, mills were built for reducing ore. Dozens of trips were made daily by mule-driven ore wagons to Virginia City, hauling timber and farm produce. The return trips brought Comstock ore for milling. Water was available in the area, which allowed both quartz and saw mills to be powered. These events lead to the founding of Washoe City.

Washoe City became the county seat of Washoe County when it was created in 1861. The new county seat attracted lawyers, doctors, and dentists, among others. The streets were lined with restaurants, stores, saloons, livery stables, drugstores, bath houses and shaving emporiums. The Washoe City post office opened in July 1862, closed in October 1888, reopened in November 1888 until December 1894. In October 1862, the Washoe Times printed its first newspaper. Later, a school, churches, a hospital, and a courthouse and jail were built.

By 1865, Washoe City had a fluctuating permanent and transient population that may have reached 6000. Washoe City started to decline after the completion of the Virginia & Truckee Railroad to the Carson River in 1869. Within a few years, the population was reduced to 2,500 residents. Milling and lumber demand was beginning to decrease, which was another player in the fall of Washoe City. In 1871, the county seat of Washoe County was moved to Reno, and in 1880, only 200 people lived in Washoe City. The post office was named Washoe from December 1894 until Jan 1914. By the early 20th century, Washoe City was empty. Nowadays, there are just the remains of many of the original buildings.

== In popular culture ==
In Hell On Wheels season 5, episode 12 ("Any Sum Within Reason"), much of the critical action takes place in and around Washoe City.

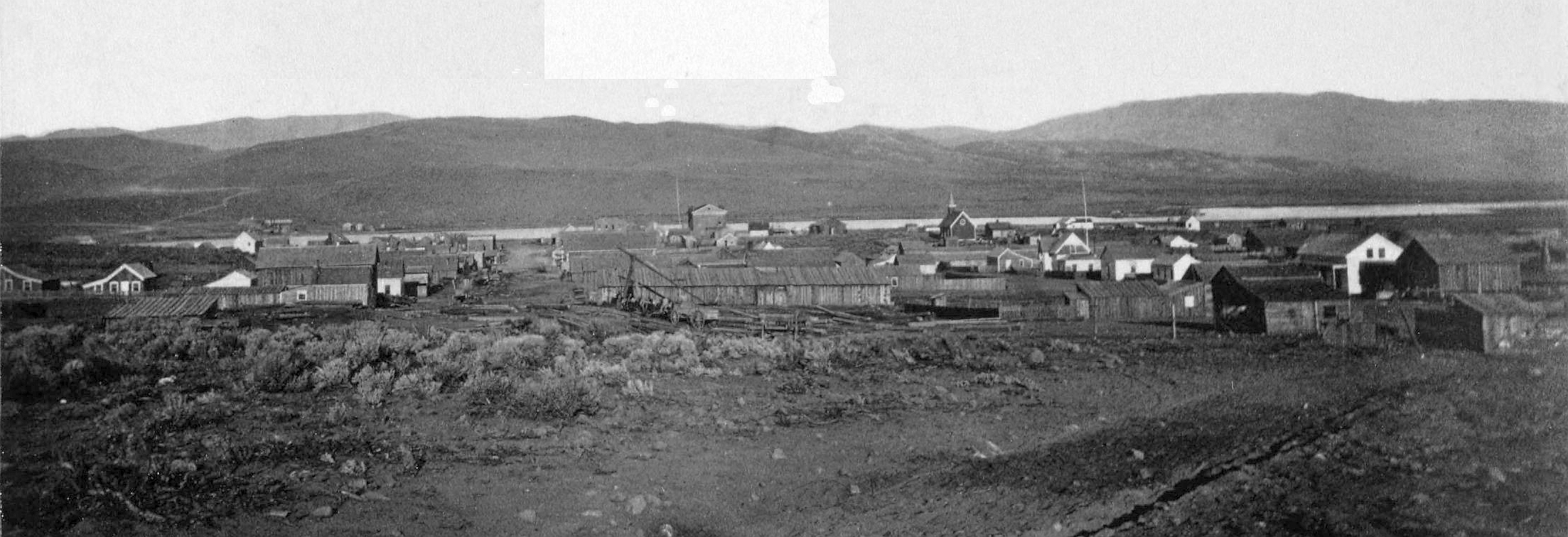
Washoe City, 1860s

== See also ==
- List of ghost towns in Nevada
