= Bowers Mansion =

Historic house in Nevada, United States

- U.S. National Register of Historic Places
- Nevada Historical Marker
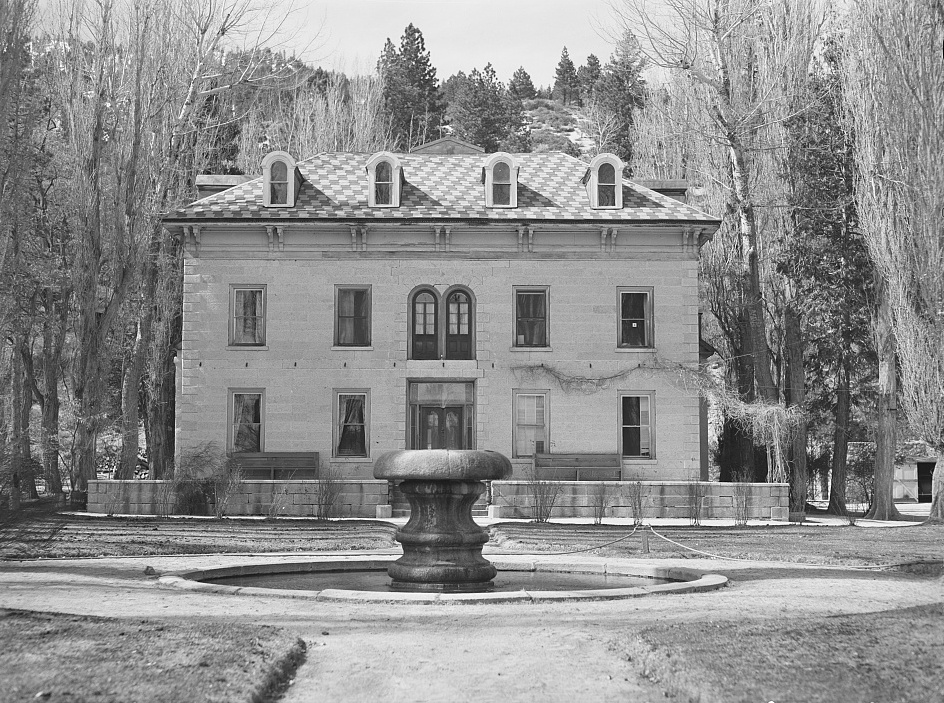
- Bowers Mansion, 1940
- Location: Washoe City, Nevada
- Coordinates: 39.284518°N 119.841438°W
- Built: 1863
- Architect: J. Neely Johnson
- Architectural style: Georgian, Italianate
- NRHP reference No.: 76001143
- No.: 166
- Added to NRHP: January 31, 1976

The Bowers Mansion is a mansion located between Reno and Carson City, Nevada. It was built in 1863 by Lemuel "Sandy" Bowers and his wife, Eilley Orrum Bowers, and is a prime example of the homes built in Nevada by the new millionaires of the Comstock Lode mining boom.

== History ==
The land originally was purchased in 1856 by Eilley and her second husband Alex Cowan, who returned to Utah a year later with other Mormon settlers. Eilley secured a divorce and moved to Gold Hill where she ran a boarding house and took in washing. Some miners, unable to pay for lodging and laundry with cash, gave Eilley Orrum pieces of their mining claims in payment. Thus she acquired the mining claim which, together with that belonging to her third husband Sandy, became the source of their fortune.

The mansion was the fulfillment of Eilley's dreams of prestige and respectability. The mansion, designed by J. Neely Johnson, a builder and ex-governor of California, combined Georgian Revival and Italianate architectural styles. It was modeled after a design conceived by Eilley based on her recollection of elegant buildings in her native Scotland. Indeed, the Bowers employed stonecutters from Scotland for the construction of their new home, which eventually cost $300,000 to build, an exorbitant sum in the 1860s. Eilley and Sandy toured Europe from 1861 to 1863, purchasing furniture, statuary, paintings and other adornments for their home. Unfortunately, in 1874, Eilley Bowers 3rd and only living child, a daughter named Persia, died of a suspected erupted appendix at the age of 12. The first 2 children died in infancy.

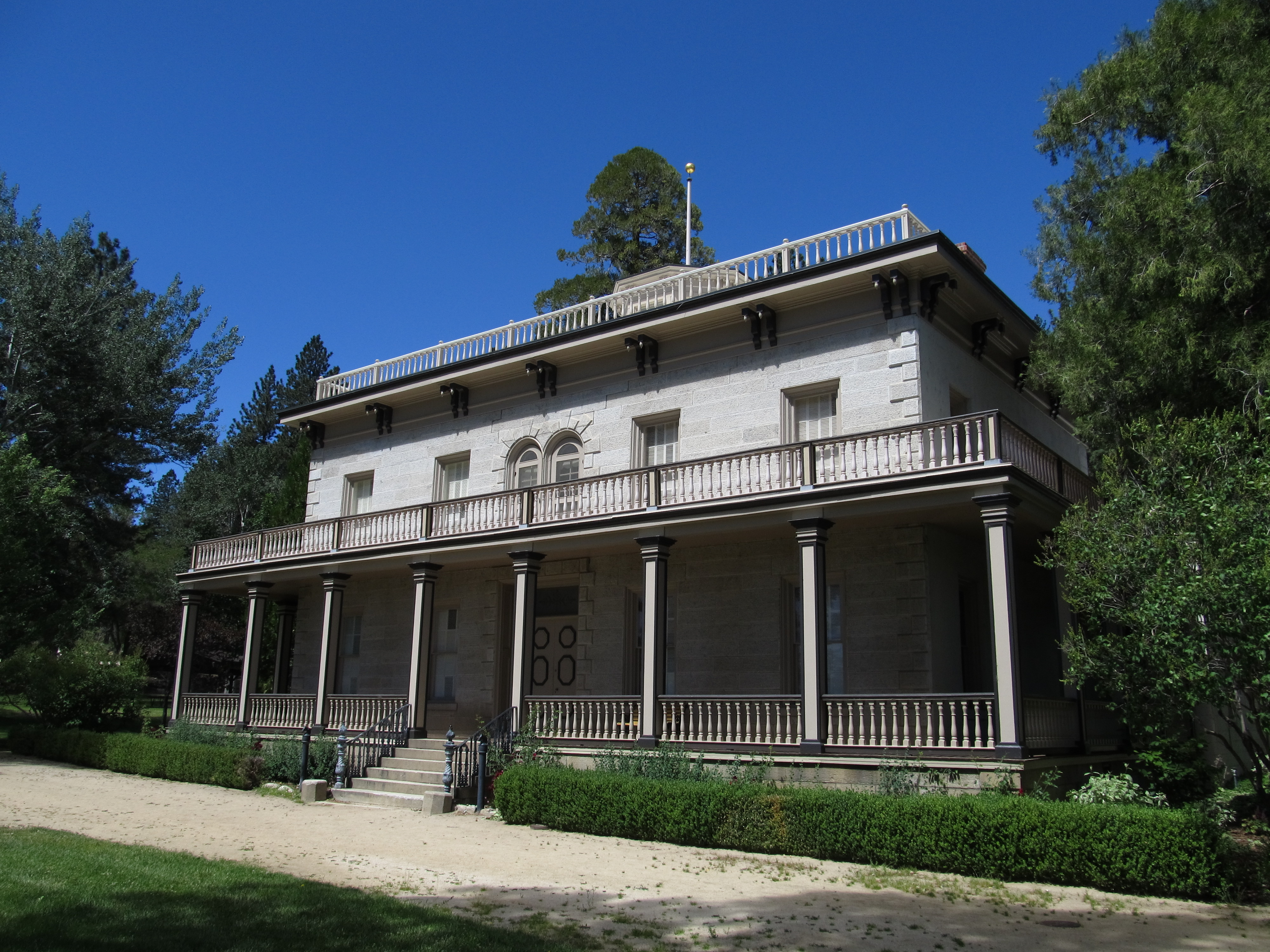
The mansion in 2012

Following the death of Sandy Bowers in 1868, Eilley fell on hard financial times. She generated income by renting out rooms in the mansion and hosting parties and picnics on the grounds. The mansion hosted a ball for the women's suffrage movement and was the location of the annual Miner's Ball. The period of 1873–75 was the height of the mansion's popularity.

However, this was not enough to overcome Eilley's debts and she finally lost her home to foreclosure in 1876. The mansion was abandoned by the time Henry Riter acquired it and operated it as a resort in 1903.

== Today ==
Bowers Mansion Regional Park is located on the eastern slope of the Sierra Nevada mountains, approximately 20 miles south of Reno on old 395. Expansive sunny lawn areas and lots of tall shade trees make this a perfect spot for picnics. The park also offers a seasonal outdoor pool, seasonal splash pad, two children's playgrounds and restroom facilities. The building is currently owned and operated by the Washoe County Regional Parks and Open Space. Some 500 Nevada families have donated period furniture housed in the mansion. Tours of the mansion are given in summer and autumn.

== Hot springs ==
The hot spring was previously used to heat a swimming pool, but the spring is no longer used for swimming. The geothermal waters are still used to provide hot water and heated showers. Part of the original geothermal pool still stands and is used as an irrigation storage pond.
