= Nevada State Route 341 =

Highway in Nevada

State Route 341
- Virginia City Highway
- SR 341 highlighted in red

Route information
- Maintained by NDOT
- Length: 22.034 mi (35.460 km)
- Existed: July 1, 1976–present
- History: Toll road established 1862; SR 17 by 1929; SR 341 in 1976

Major junctions
- South end: US 50 in Mound House
- SR 342 in Silver City and Virginia City
- North end: US 395 Alt. / SR 431 in Reno

Location
- Country: United States
- State: Nevada
- Counties: Lyon, Storey, Washoe

Highway system
- Nevada State Highway System; Interstate; US; State; Pre‑1976; Scenic
← SR 340	→ SR 342

State Route 341 (SR 341) is a state highway in western Nevada connecting US 50 (US 50) near Dayton to Reno via Virginia City. Commonly known as the Virginia City Highway, or Geiger Grade north of Virginia City, the route has origins dating back to the 1860s.

== Route description ==
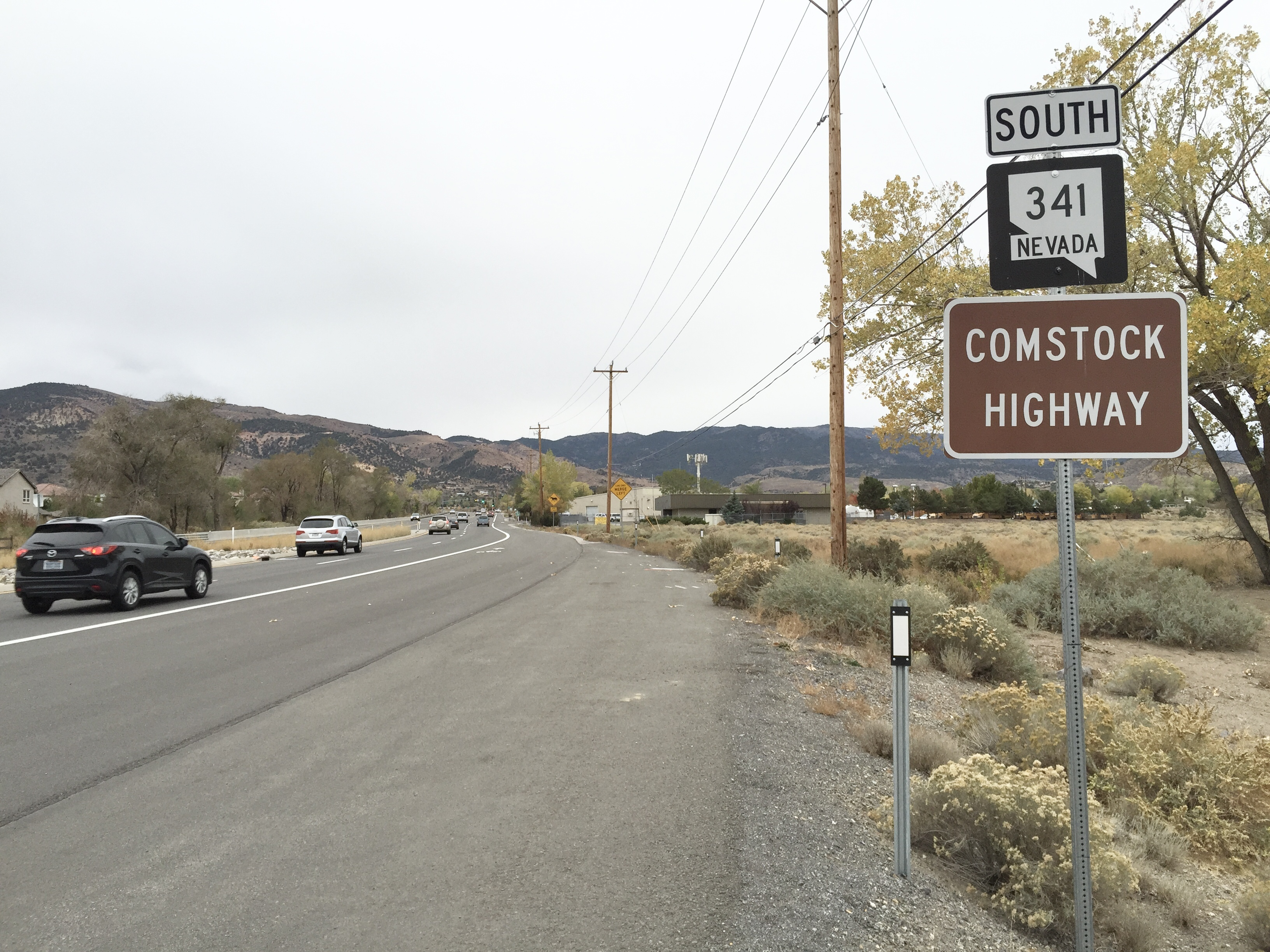
View from the north end of SR 341 looking southbound as seen in 2015

State Route 341 begins at a point along US 50 in Lyon County between Mound House and Dayton, about 3.5 miles (5.6 km) to the west of the latter. From this intersection, the highway proceeds north towards its south junction with SR 342 in Silver City. From here, SR 341 veers eastward around Silver City and Gold Hill, proceeds up the Occidental Grade and bridges over the Virginia and Truckee Railroad at the site of that line's daylighted Tunnel #5 before reconnecting with SR 342 on the south side of Virginia City. The highway runs along C Street as it travels northward through Virginia City. SR 341 leaves Virginia City and travels northerly and westerly through winding sections on both sides of Geiger Summit. The highway then terminates just north of Steamboat Springs at Tahoe Junction, a major signalized intersection with South Virginia Street/Carson-Reno Highway (US 395 Alt.) and Mount Rose Highway (SR 431).

The Nevada Department of Transportation refers to the entire route (except the portion between the SR 342 junctions, which is known locally as the Occidental Grade) as the Comstock Highway.

The highway is also known as Geiger Grade between Virginia City and Tahoe Junction, though parts of its modern-day alignment deviates from the original alignment of the old stagecoach route.

== History ==
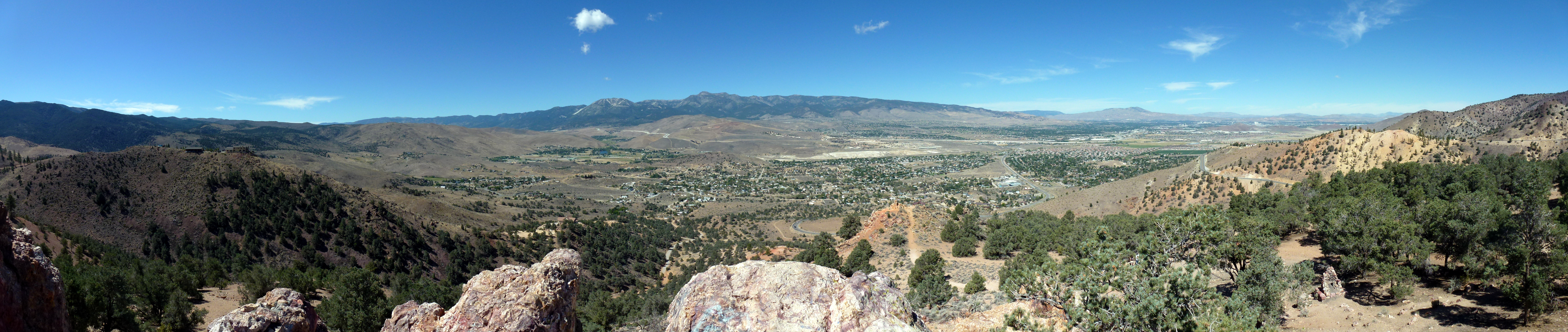
Panoramic view towards Reno, from a lookout point along the Geiger Grade portion of SR 341 as seen in 2014

SR 341 began as a toll facility constructed by Davison M. Geiger and John H. Tilton in 1862. Despite the dangers associated with traveling the route, Geiger Grade was a well-traveled route that provided the most direct connection between the Comstock Lode and the Reno area.

The road appears on highway maps dating back to at least 1919. However, it wasn't until 1929 that the route first appeared as State Route 17 on official Nevada highway maps. The original road was replaced with the present-day paved highway alignment in 1936.

The highway remained largely unchanged until the 1970s. In the Nevada state highway renumbering that began on July 1, 1976, the entirety of State Route 17 was reassigned to present-day SR 341; this change first appears on the 1978-79 version of the official state map.

== Major intersections ==
Note: Mileposts in Nevada reset at county lines. The start and end mileposts for each county are given in the county column.

County	Location	mi	km	Destinations	Notes
Lyon; 0.00–4.90	Mound House	0.000	0.000	US 50 – Dayton, Carson City	Southern terminus
Storey; 0.00–10.84	Silver City			SR 342 north – Silver City, Gold Hill	Southern terminus of SR 342; no truck access
Storey; 0.00–10.84	Virginia City			SR 342 south – Gold Hill, Silver City	Northern terminus of SR 342; no truck access
Storey; 0.00–10.84	Virginia City			Mill Street – Dayton	Former SR 79 east
Washoe; 0.00–6.30	Reno			Veterans Parkway	Roundabout
Washoe; 0.00–6.30	Reno	22.034	35.460	US 395 Alt. (S. Virginia Street) – Reno, Washoe City	Northern terminus; former SR 430/US 395
Washoe; 0.00–6.30	Reno	22.034	35.460	SR 431 west (Mount Rose Highway) – Incline Village, North Lake Tahoe	Continuation beyond northern terminus
1.000 mi = 1.609 km; 1.000 km = 0.621 mi
