= Johntown, Nevada =

- Ghost town
- Location within Nevada Location within the United States
- Coordinates: 39°15′07″N 119°37′25″W
- Country: United States
- State: Nevada
- County: Lyon

Johntown is a ghost town in Lyon County, Nevada United States. It was originally an important mining camp in Gold Canyon, midway between Dayton, Nevada and Silver City. In the late 1850s, Johntown was the largest mining camp in the western Utah Territory.

== History ==
The Johntown camp was first established in the early 1850s when teamster, James Fenemore, set up a mining camp next to the Gold Canyon road. Two years earlier, emigrants journeying to California, had discovered gold at the entrance to Gold Canyon near Dayton.

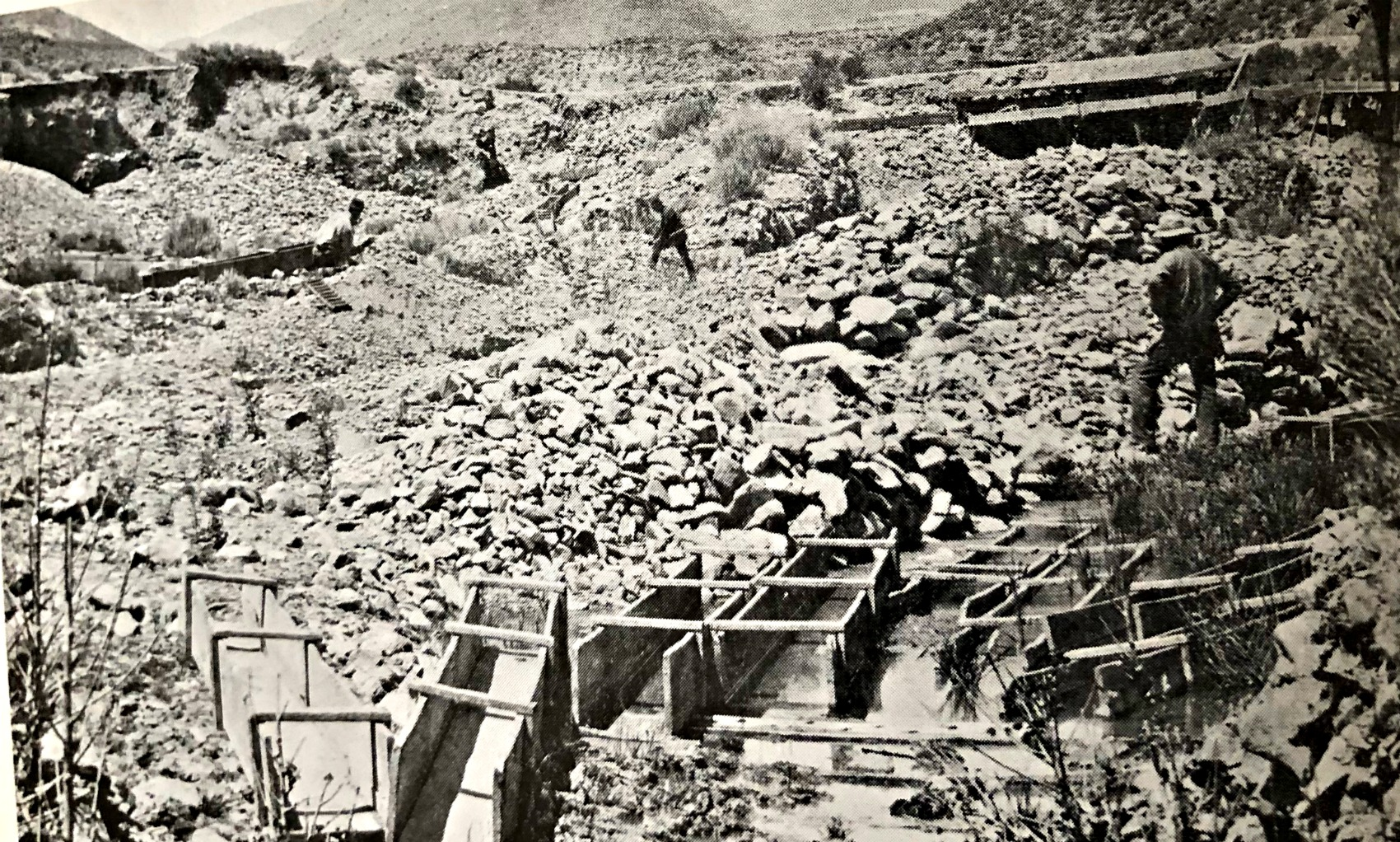
Johntown site, 1880s

For the next 10 years, miners worked the area, "sluicing the placer deposits with primitive rockers and long toms, recovering limited amounts of gold." The canyon was populated just a few months out of the year, when water was available for sluicing.

Johntown settlement was the site of the first newspaper published in Nevada. In the mid 1850s and handwritten on foolscap, a single copy of the Gold Canyon Switch, was passed from miner to miner to deliver the local news. Joe Webb edited the newspaper between 1854 and 1858.

From 1857 to 1859, Johntown was the largest mining camp in the western Utah Territory and its most important mining area. The Comstock silver rush began with this small camp in the winter of 1859, when miners traveled up Gold Canyon and became the earliest to mine gold at Gold Hill. In June of that year, Gold Hill was the site where the Comstock silver discoveries were made. By the early 1860, the Johntown mining camp was abandoned.

There are no original buildings to mark the site of the original settlement. The Johntown Nevada historical marker is located on the east side of Nevada State Route 341, south of Silver City.

== See also ==
- List of ghost towns in Nevada
