= Nevada State Route 342 =

Highway in Nevada

State Route 342
- Silver City/Gold Hill Road
- SR 342 highlighted in red

Route information
- Maintained by NDOT
- Length: 3.780 mi (6.083 km)
- Existed: July 1, 1976–present
- Restrictions: No trucks allowed on SR 342, must use SR 341

Major junctions
- South end: SR 341 in Silver City
- North end: SR 341 in Virginia City

Location
- Country: United States
- State: Nevada
- Counties: Lyon, Storey

Highway system
- Nevada State Highway System; Interstate; US; State; Pre‑1976; Scenic
← SR 341	→ SR 359

State Route 342 (SR 342) is a short state highway in Nevada, United States. It is a loop route of State Route 341, running north through the communities of Silver City and Gold Hill before returning to State Route 341 near Virginia City. This highway is a historic route, dating back to the Comstock Lode of the 1860s. The highway loosely parallels, and crosses, the route of the Virginia and Truckee Railroad. Prior to renumbering in the 1970s this route was known as State Route 80.

== Route description ==
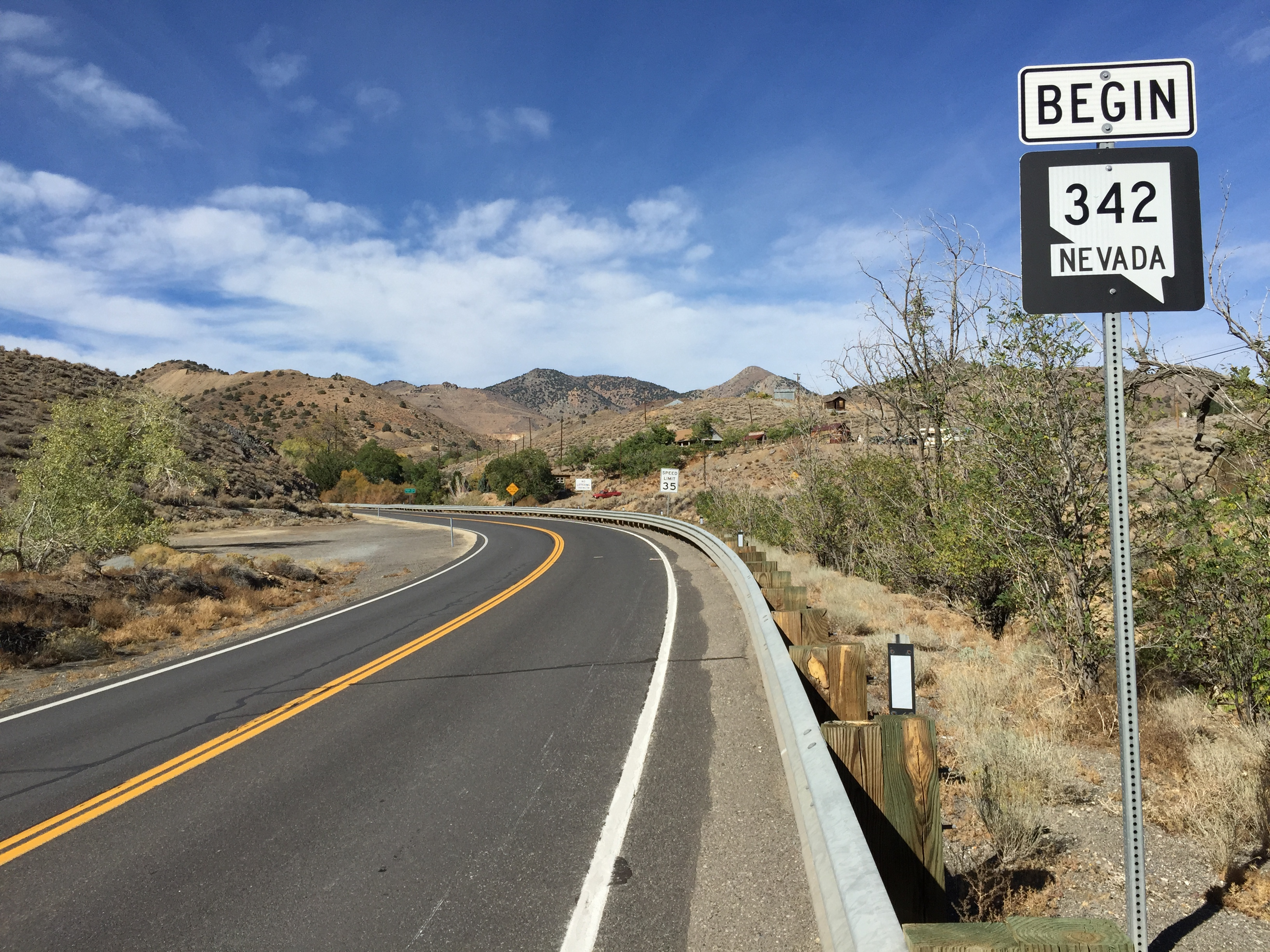
View from the south end of SR 342 looking northbound as seen in 2015

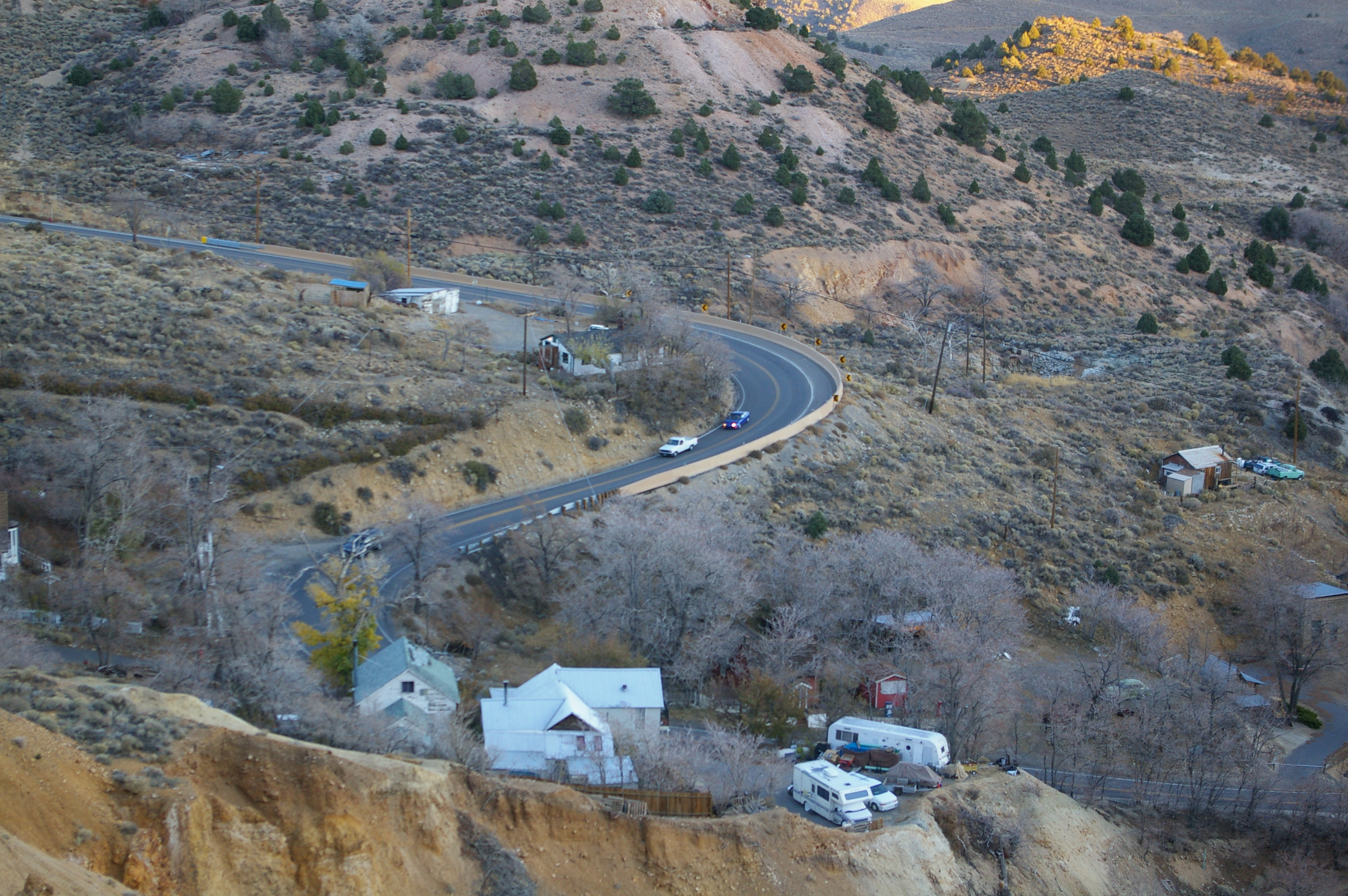
Hairpin curve and steep grades between Gold Hill and Virginia City as seen in 2008

SR 342 is the original and shorter of the two routes between Silver City and Virginia City. However, trucks are required to use newer alignment (SR 341) due to 15% grades and hairpin curves. The route begins just south of Gold Hill, at the junction with SR 341. Both routes have Virginia City listed as the first control city, however all trucks are directed to use SR 341 instead of SR 342. The highway runs through narrow Gold Canyon for its entire length. This highway serves as the main street of Gold Hill and Silver City. While in Silver City the highway crosses the Virginia and Truckee Railroad, now a heritage railroad that once served as a primary route to transport silver from the mines in Virginia City.

== History ==
This highway was the principal highway between Virginia City and Carson City and has been in use since the Comstock Lode of the 1860s. The highway has appeared on Nevada highway maps since at least as far back as 1919 and was first numbered part of Nevada State Route 17 (modern State Route 341) sometime in the 1920s. The 1937 edition of the official Nevada Highway Map was the first to show both routes between Virginia City and Silver City, with both routes numbered 17. The 1949 edition showed separate numbers for the two routes, with the older route now numbered 80. It retained the 80 designation at least to 1979, before being renumbered route 342.

In 2015, the highway was closed for about 5 months after heavy rains caused the roadway to sink into a shaft of an nearby abandoned silver mine. The highway was rebuilt on a new alignment to pass the mine shaft to the East and the cap over the mine rebuilt. The collapsed mine also forced AT&T to relocate a number of telephone lines in the area.

== Major intersections ==
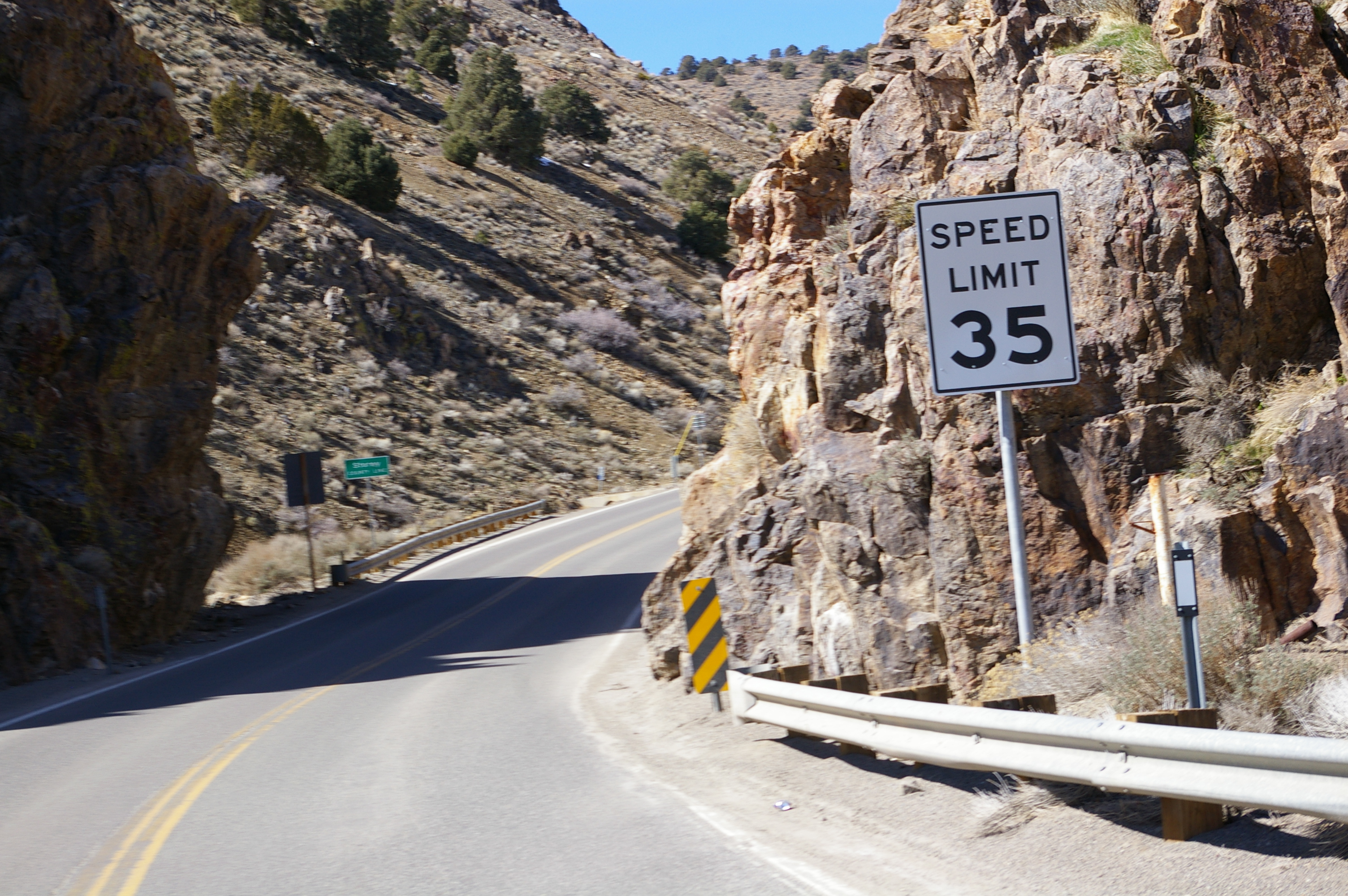
SR 342 inside Gold Canyon between Silver City and Gold Hill as seen in 2008

Mileposts in Nevada reset at county lines; the start and end mileposts are given in the county column.

County	Location	mi	km	Destinations	Notes
Lyon; 0.00–0.84	Silver City	0.000	0.000	SR 341 – Virginia City, Dayton, Carson City	Southern terminus; truck route
Storey; 0.00–2.943	Virginia City	3.780	6.083	SR 341 – Silver City, Reno	Northern terminus; truck route
1.000 mi = 1.609 km; 1.000 km = 0.621 mi
