= Nevada State Route 80 =

Interstate 80 in Nevada

Nevada State Route 80 (1940s)

Nevada State Route 80

Nevada State Route 80 may refer to:

- Interstate 80 in Nevada, part of the Interstate Highway System
- Nevada State Route 80 (1940s), which existed until the 1970s renumbering
