= Nevada State Route 79 =

Former state highway in Nevada, United States

State Route 79
- Six Mile Canyon Road

Route information
- Length: 7.9 mi (12.7 km)
- Existed: ?–1976

Major junctions
- West end: SR 17 in Virginia City
- East end: US 50 in Dayton

Location
- Country: United States
- State: Nevada
- Counties: Storey, Lyon

Highway system
- Nevada State Highway System; Interstate; US; State; Pre‑1976; Scenic

State Route 79 (SR 79) was a state highway in Storey and Lyon counties in Nevada. Also known as Six Mile Canyon Road, the highway was an 7.9-mile (12.7 km) road connecting Virginia City to U.S. Route 50 (US 50) in Dayton. Six Mile Canyon, along with nearby Gold Canyon, was the site of some of the state's first mining efforts and earliest encampments.
