= Gold Hill Depot =

Railroad station from the 1870s in Nevada, USA

Gold Hill
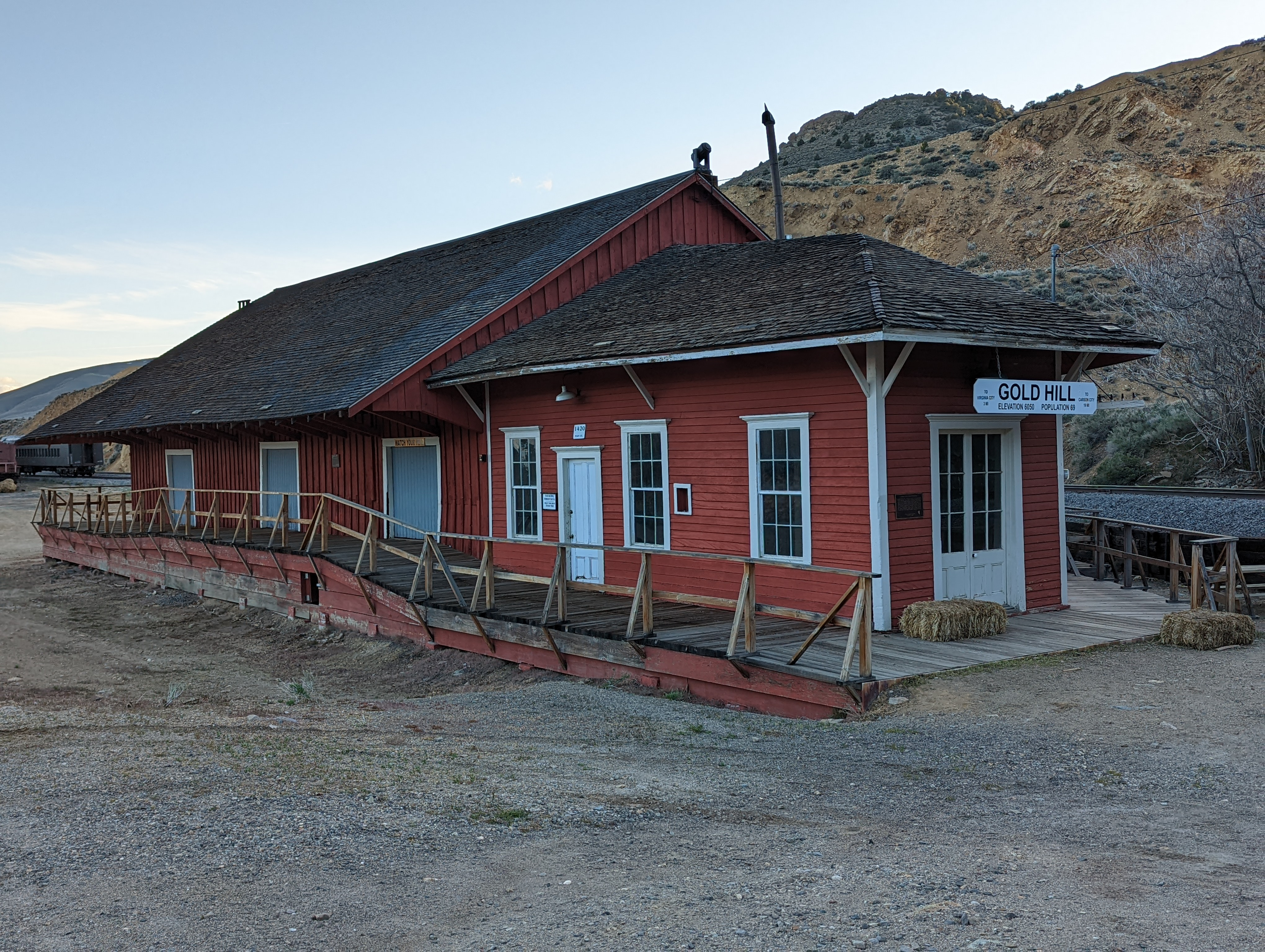
- The V&T Depot in Gold Hill

General information
- Location: 1420 N Main St; Gold Hill, Nevada
- Coordinates: 39.2939°N 119.6577°W
- Platforms: 1 side platform
- Tracks: 1 (+1 pocket)

History
- Opened: November 12, 1869; 1921; 1991
- Closed: 1916; October 1, 1937
- Rebuilt: 1872; 1974–1976

Former services
Preceding station	Virginia and Truckee Railroad	Following station
Mound House toward Reno	Main Line	Virginia City Terminus
Location

The Gold Hill Depot is a railroad depot in Gold Hill, Nevada. It was built for the Virginia and Truckee Railroad (V&T) for passengers and freight being transported to the booming Comstock Lode. The depot is located on a flat tract of land near the top of Gold Hill. Immediately past the railroad crossing, Highway 342 goes up a couple of hairpin turns to make its final ascent into Virginia City. Passing the depot, the V&T line wrapped around the hill that Fort Homestead was built on, originally going through a tunnel on its climb to Virginia City.

== History ==
As planning for the railroad began in 1869, the station site was purchased for $5,000. (Note: equivalent to $120,938 in 2025 adjusted for inflation) The Gold Hill site was a stop on the inaugural services on the V&T, with the first station being nothing more than a loading dock. A section of the old Steamboat station was subsequently moved to Gold Hill to function as the first station building. The combination depot was built in 1872, opening that October. At its height, 45 trains stopped at Gold Hill per day. As a result in a downturn in passenger operations, the depot was closed between 1916 and 1921. It stopped seeing use by the V&T in 1937 when the Crown Point Trestle was destroyed to make room for mining use; the last regular scheduled passenger run was on October 1. The station's final passenger service was on June 5, 1938 as it hosted a run to Reno sponsored by the California-Nevada Railroad Society.

Following closure, the building fell into disrepair, with rumors that the railroad was offering it for sale for $250 in 1945. (Note: equivalent to $4,471 in 2025 adjusted for inflation) The railroad sold the station to Storey County the following year, though the building did not receive any immediate attention. Restoration of the depot began in 1974 in anticipation of new V&T service. Trains started running again from near the newly rebuilt depot in the late 1976. Reconstruction of Tunnel 4 allowed excursions to run directly to the depot once again in 1991.

Upon the reconstruction of the V&T down to Mound House and the extreme eastern edge of Carson City, the V&T's steam trains run all the way down to the Eastgate Depot, past Gold Hill. V&T's diesel trains and shorter steam excursions stop at the Gold Hill depot and turn around and head back up the hill to Virginia City. Fundraising for restoration of the building was ongoing through the 2000s.

== Design ==
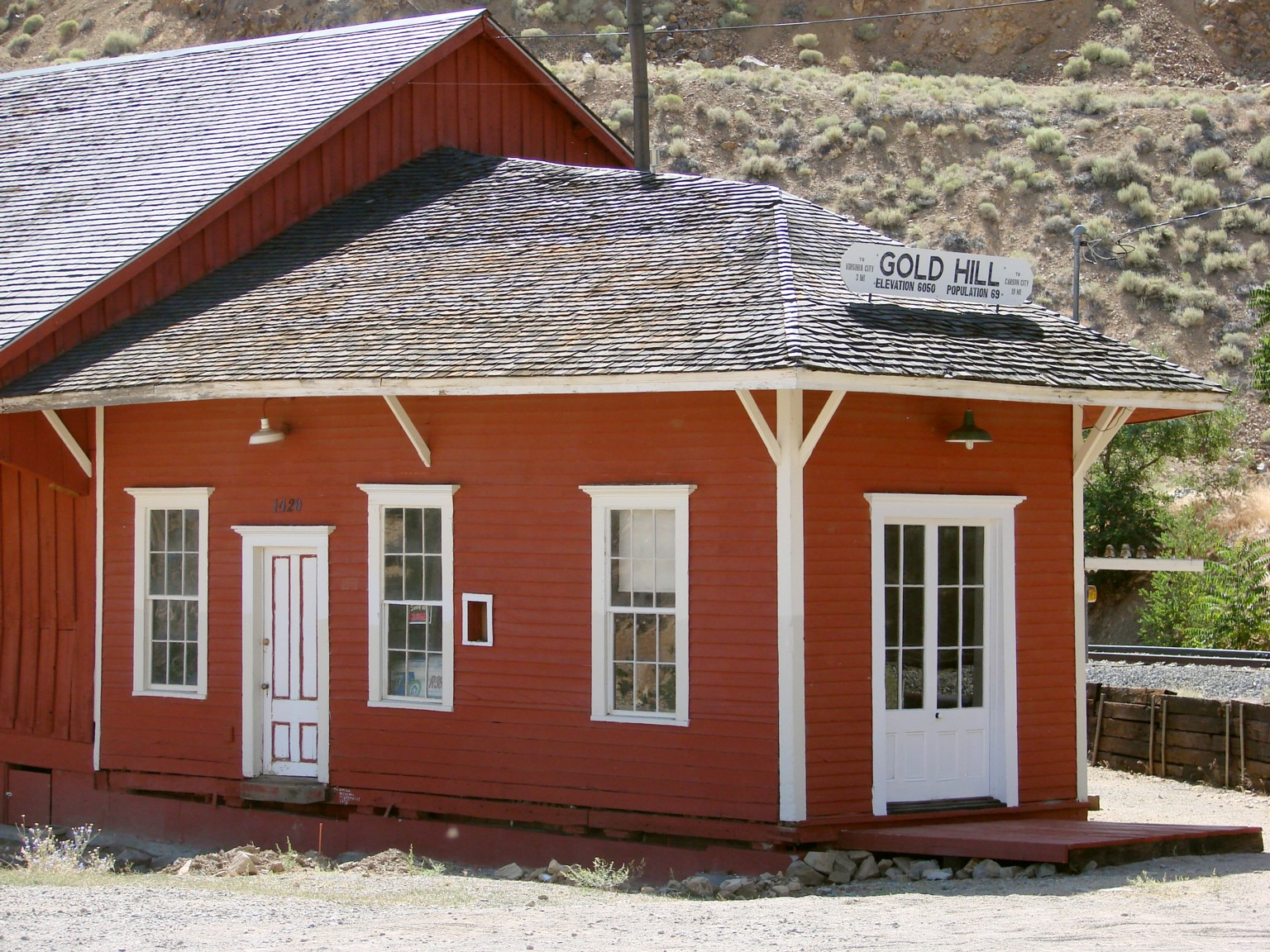
The former women's waiting room seen in 2010

The station building was constructed piecemeal, with several extensions and additions over the years. The combination freight and passenger section is the south end of the building, and the women's waiting room is the smaller addition on the north side. The tracks' approach from the south features a short passing siding. One side led to a small yard which featured two pocket tracks (one since removed), facilitating freight cars at the station.
