= Gold Hill Daily News =

Defunct newspaper

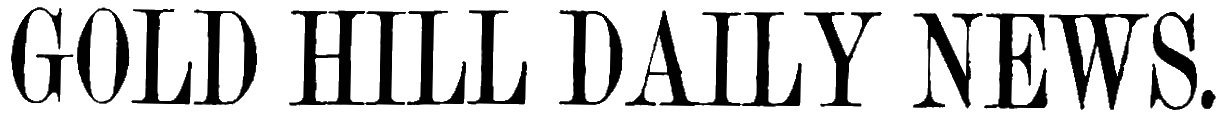
- Type: Daily newspaper
- Founded: October 12, 1863
- Ceased publication: April 1882
- Political alignment: Republican
- Language: English
- Headquarters: Gold Hill, Nevada
- Circulation: 2,750 (1881)

The Gold Hill Daily News was a daily newspaper in Gold Hill, Nevada that was published from 1863 to 1882, during the Comstock silver boom. The paper was politically Republican and a rival of the Territorial Enterprise in neighboring Virginia City.
