= Gold Canyon (California) =

Coordinates: 39°26′05″N 120°49′31″W

Gold Canyon is located a few miles south of Alleghany, California, United States, on the border between Sierra and Nevada Counties. The middle fork of the Yuba River flows through the canyon. Gold mining began in Gold Canyon in the early 1850s and has continued to present day. Three major gold mines are located here: German Bar Mine, Gold Canõn Mine, and Independent Mine.

In 1859 the Gold Canyon area became the first to ban Chinese miners, after a group of 50 Chinese miners had earned a reported $35,000. This decision was adapted elsewhere, and laid the foundation for Senator William Morris Stewart's U.S. Mining Act of 1866, which prohibited Chinese workers from holding original mining claims.

Before power was brought to the area, the nearby Plumbago Mine built a power plant on the river next to the present day bridge. A dam was also built about a mile up river which fed a 3-foot-diameter (0.91 m) redwood penstock that supplied high pressure water to the power plant.

Once power was brought to the area, the power plant was shut down, and soon afterward local miners began dismantling the penstock to use the redwood. In 1926 William Whore used the wood to build three cabins. Two of those remain today, but the third burned in 1949. There was also extensive drag line dredging done in the river, just west of the old power plant site. Huge piles of giant boulders remain in arc shaped piles on the south side of the river.

Today there is still active mining in Gold Canyon, both placer and hard rock. The Plumbago Mine, for instance, was still in operation as of 2006.
