= Silver City, Nevada =

Unincorporated community in Nevada, US

- Unincorporated community
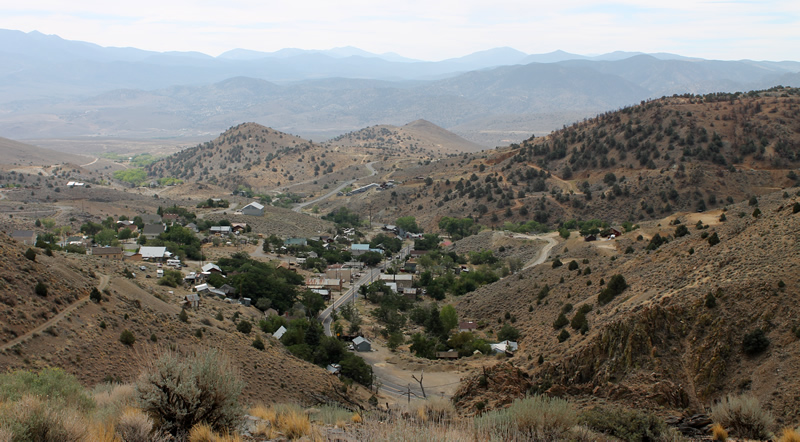

- Location within Nevada Location within the United States
- Coordinates: 39°15′49″N 119°38′26″W
- Country: United States
- State: Nevada
- County: Lyon

Area
  - Total: 0.97 sq mi (2.50 km^{2})
  - Land: 0.97 sq mi (2.50 km^{2})
  - Water: 0 sq mi (0.00 km^{2})
- Elevation: 5,102 ft (1,555 m)

Population (2020)
  - Total: 155
  - Density: 160.3/sq mi (61.89/km^{2})
- Time zone: UTC-8 (Pacific (PST))
  - Summer (DST): UTC-7 (PDT)
- ZIP code: 89428
- Area code: 775
- FIPS code: 32-66800
- GNIS feature ID: 2728753

Silver City is a small residential community in Lyon County, Nevada, United States. Established in 1859, it developed as a mining settlement during the Comstock era and served as an important staging point between nearby mines and ore-processing mills along the Carson River. Although its mines never rivaled those of Virginia City or Gold Hill, Silver City played a supporting role in the Comstock mining economy. The town declined after 1869, following completion of the Virginia and Truckee Railroad, which bypassed the community.

== Description ==
Silver City is a census-designated place (CDP) and small residential community in Lyon County, Nevada, United States, near the Lyon–Carson border. It is located in Gold Canyon, on Nevada State Route 342, approximately four miles (6.4 km) north of U.S. Route 50. The town is about two miles (3.2 km) south of Gold Hill and approximately 3.7 miles (5.9 km) south of Virginia City. The population was 111 in 2023.

== History ==
=== Mining and Industry ===
The Silver City mining district, initially known as the Devil's Gate district, was established on November 19, 1859, and named for the nearby Devil's Gate rock formation. The district covered a rectangular area measuring about 3.5 by 4 miles (5.6 by 6.4 km) and was located approximately two miles (3.2 km) from Dayton. Silver City is located near the center of the district. The first mining claim, the Wildcat, was recorded on November 24, 1859, and by January 1, 1860, more than 100 claims were recorded. Two of the district's most productive mines were the Dayton and the Daney.

Silver City became an important mining and industrial settlement, serving as a milling and supply center for the mines of Virginia City, the Devil's Gate district and surrounding mining areas, and the ore-processing mills along the Carson River. Although the town hosted many productive mines during the 1860s and 1870s, none produced major ore bonanzas comparable to Virginia City and Gold Hill.

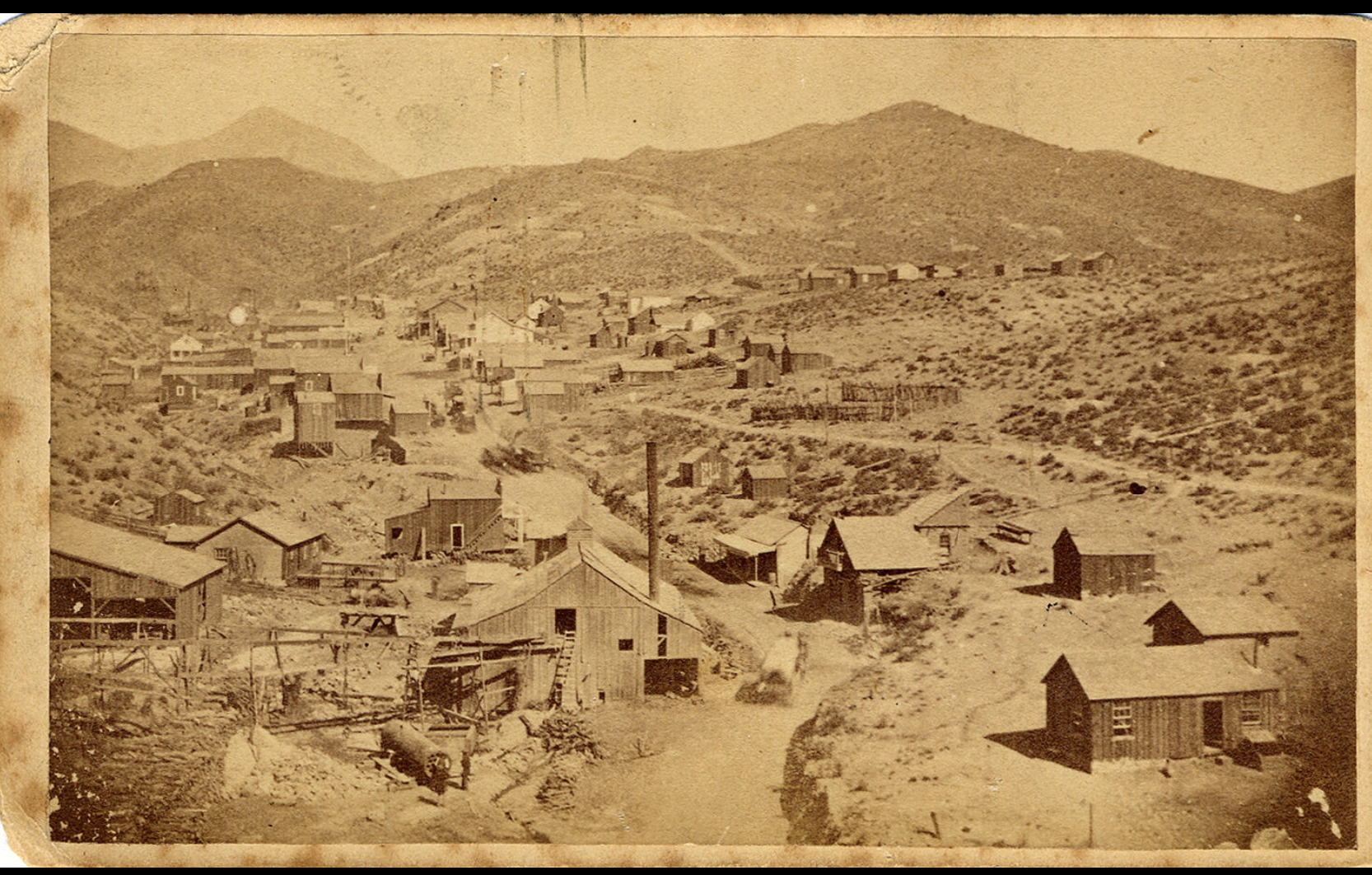
Silver City, 1860

The town was the site of one of the first steam-powered quartz mills on the Comstock Lode, Paul's Pioneer Mill, which began operating in August 1860. The mill used a 40-horsepower engine and twelve 800-pound stamps, producing custom milling and crushing about 20 tons of rock per day.

The Nevada Foundry, the first and largest iron foundry in Nevada, was moved to Silver City from Johntown in 1864. It initially employed about 75 workers, increasing their number to 100 as demand grew. In 1872, a fire destroyed the foundry except for its outer walls. The owner, left with little but his patterns and tools, relocated his business to Virginia City and purchased the Fulton Foundry.

=== Town life and services ===
Silver City was among the earliest settlements in the Comstock region and was a thriving community by 1860. With an initial population of 564, the town soon had four hotels, several saloons, about 20 stores, boarding houses, and numerous residences. At its height, Silver City had a population of 1,200. The town also provided boarding facilities for animals used to haul ore-laden wagons between the Comstock mines and mills along the Carson River.

The Virginia and Truckee Railroad, which bypassed Silver City to the west, was completed in 1869. The railroad ended the town's role as an important freight center and contributed to its eventual decline.

== Nearby settlements ==
Several small settlements and camps developed near Silver City during the Comstock mining boom. Devil’s Gate was a short-lived settlement that served travelers and miners, with two hotels, several saloons, and shops during its peak years. Johntown was another early mining camp.

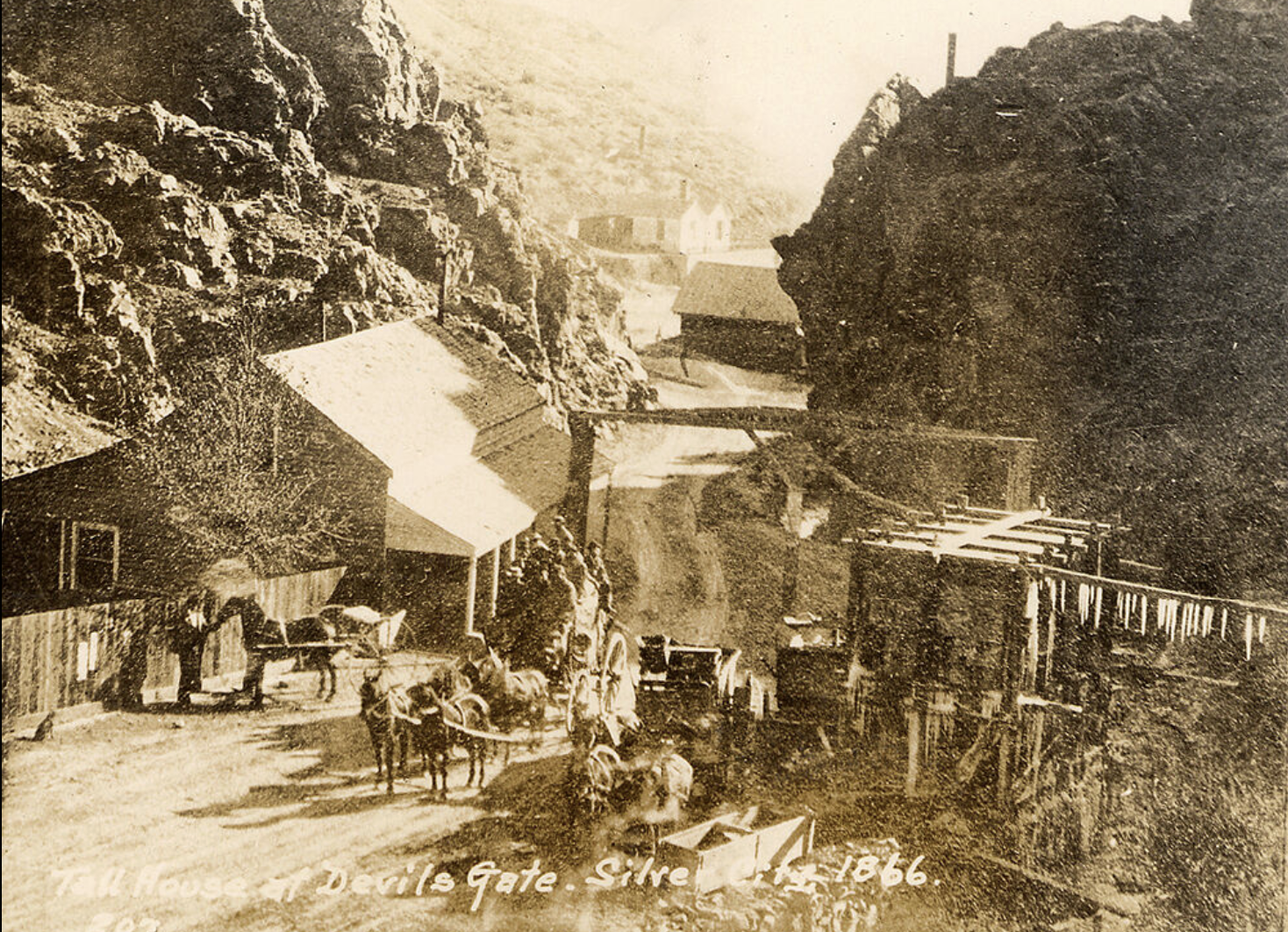
Toll house at Devil's Gate, 1866

=== Devil's Gate ===
Devil’s Gate marks the boundary line between Storey and Lyon Counties. Formed from metamorphic rock, the narrow canyon created a natural gateway in Gold Canyon. The site is located about 3.5 miles (5.6 km) south of Virginia City on State Route 341, at the entrance to Silver City. The important mining and service settlement developed adjacent to Devil's Gate after the discovery of silver in the area. During the Pyramid Lake War of May, 1860, residents of Silver City built a stone fort and wooden cannon on the eastern summit overlooking Devil's Gate for protection.

For several years, an official toll station operated at the gate, and the passage was widened in the mid-19th century when the outer rock face was removed by blasting to accommodate wagon traffic. The settlement had limited local resources and depended on activity in the Comstock mines for economic survival. At its peak, the town included two hotels, two stables, a brewery, an express office, a post office, a barber shop, two shoe shops, a blacksmith shop, a general merchandise store and several saloons.

=== Johntown ===
In the late 1850s, Johntown was the largest mining camp in the western Utah Territory. The settlement, established in 1853, was located about 1.5 miles (2.4 km) south of Silver City, approximately halfway between present-day Dayton and Silver City. Miners in the area used rudimentary placer mining tools to recover small quantities of gold from the 1850s until 1860. When miners from Johntown discovered gold in the hills of Gold Canyon in 1859, they became the first miners at Gold Hill, and many relocated there to establish the new settlement. Johntown subsequently declined as population and mining activity shifted to the new camp.

== Geography ==
=== Climate ===
Silver City experiences a warm summer Mediterranean climate (Csb).

Climate data for Silver City (6,189 ft/1,886 m)
Month	Jan	Feb	Mar	Apr	May	Jun	Jul	Aug	Sep	Oct	Nov	Dec	Year
Record high °F (°C)	63 (17)	70 (21)	64 (18)	79 (26)	89 (32)	95 (35)	99 (37)	100 (38)	93 (34)	85 (29)	72 (22)	69 (21)	100 (38)
Mean daily maximum °F (°C)	41.2 (5.1)	43.5 (6.4)	48.9 (9.4)	55.2 (12.9)	64.6 (18.1)	74.1 (23.4)	83.2 (28.4)	81.6 (27.6)	73.6 (23.1)	61.9 (16.6)	49.5 (9.7)	41.7 (5.4)	59.9 (15.5)
Daily mean °F (°C)	32.9 (0.5)	34.8 (1.6)	39.3 (4.1)	44.8 (7.1)	53.5 (11.9)	62.5 (16.9)	71.1 (21.7)	69.5 (20.8)	61.9 (16.6)	51.2 (10.7)	40.5 (4.7)	33.5 (0.8)	49.6 (9.8)
Mean daily minimum °F (°C)	24.3 (−4.3)	26.1 (−3.3)	29.8 (−1.2)	34.3 (1.3)	42.4 (5.8)	50.8 (10.4)	59 (15)	57.3 (14.1)	50.5 (10.3)	40.7 (4.8)	31.5 (−0.3)	25.1 (−3.8)	39.3 (4.1)
Record low °F (°C)	−1 (−18)	−9 (−23)	4 (−16)	10 (−12)	15 (−9)	28 (−2)	36 (2)	31 (−1)	21 (−6)	11 (−12)	6 (−14)	−11 (−24)	−11 (−24)
Average precipitation inches (mm)	2.1 (53)	1.9 (48)	1.5 (38)	0.7 (18)	0.9 (23)	0.6 (15)	0.3 (7.6)	0.4 (10)	0.5 (13)	0.6 (15)	1.3 (33)	2 (51)	12.7 (320)
Average snowfall inches (cm)	14.3 (36)	12.7 (32)	7.7 (20)	2.2 (5.6)	1.2 (3.0)	0.1 (0.25)	0 (0)	0 (0)	0.2 (0.51)	0.8 (2.0)	5.1 (13)	13 (33)	57.3 (146)
Average precipitation days	7	6	6	4	4	3	2	2	2	3	4	6	49
Average snowy days	4.2	4.2	2.8	1.2	0.5	0.1	0	0	0.2	0.2	2.1	3.9	19.4
Source: Weatherbase

== See also ==
- List of ghost towns in Nevada

== Gallery ==
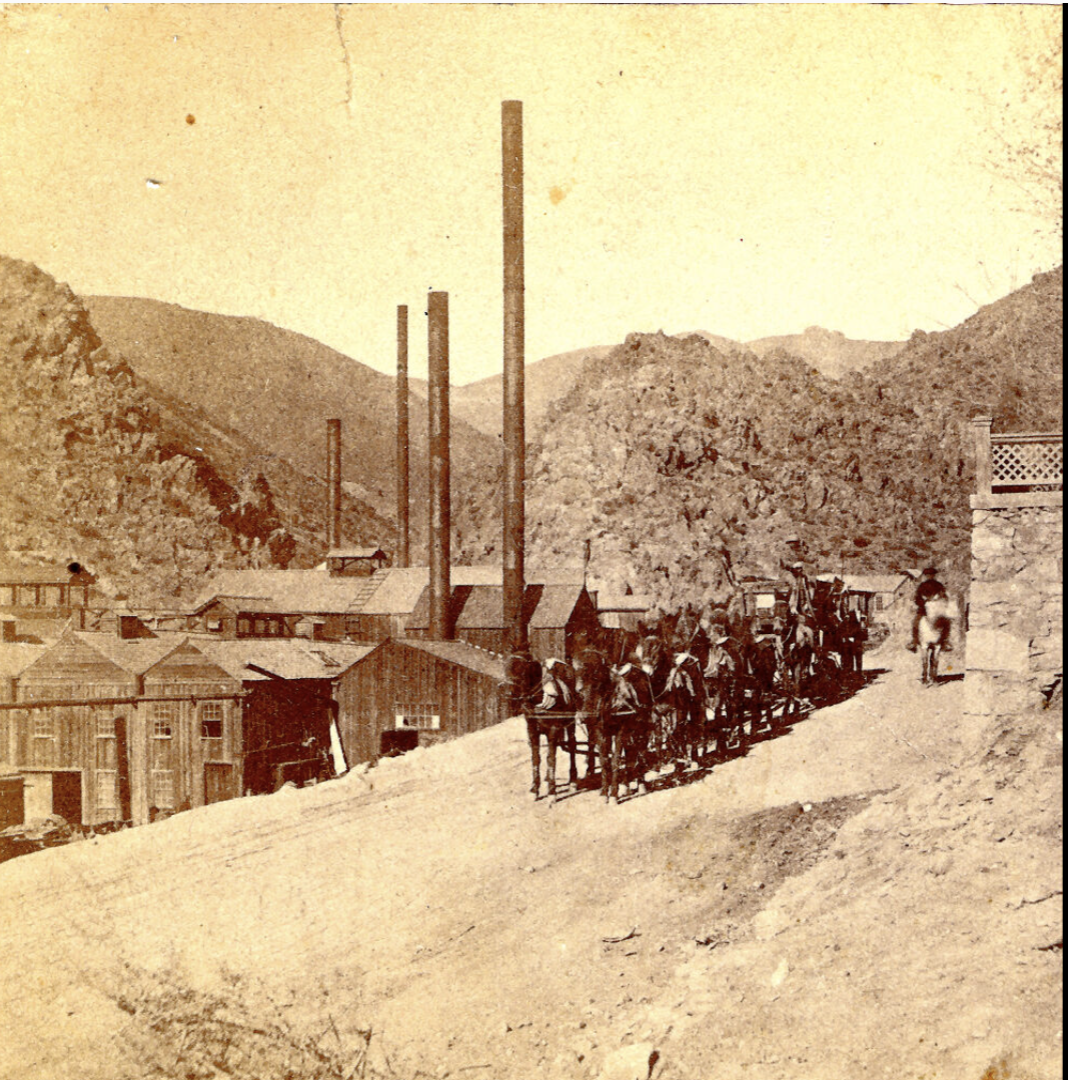
Pioneer and Devil's Gate mills

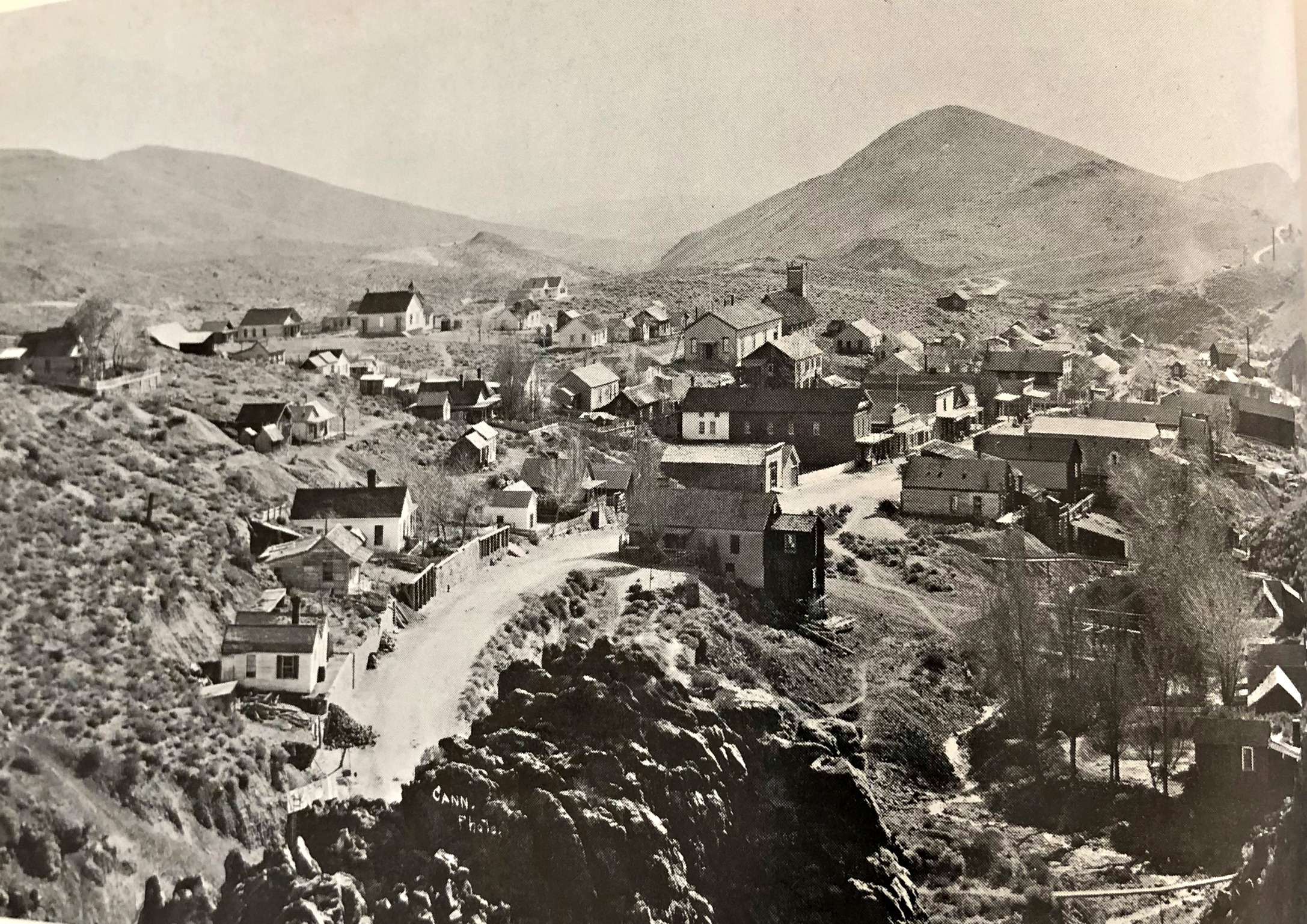
Silver City, overlooking Gold Canyon

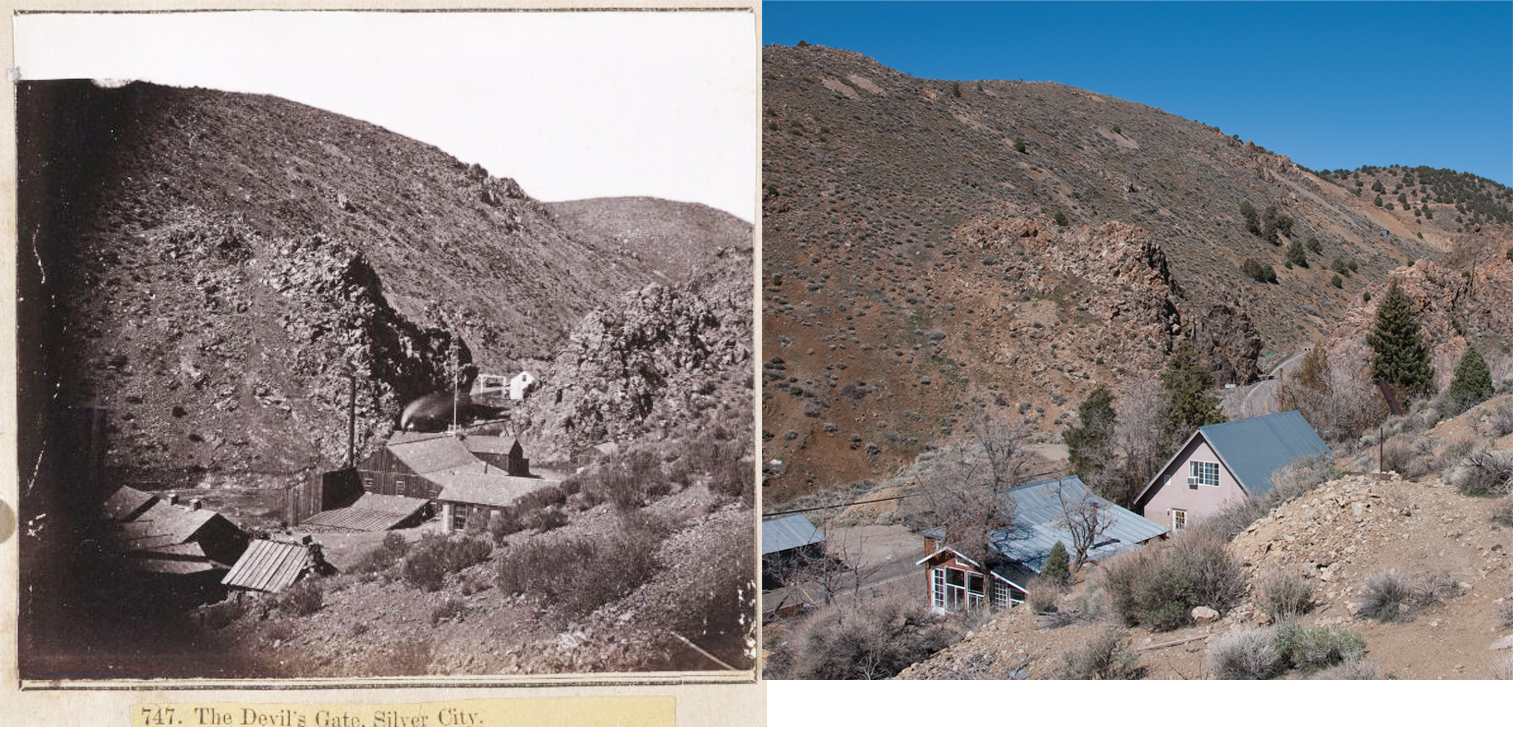
Devils Gate; Silver City. circa 1866 & 2010.

== Sources ==
- Angel, Myron, ed. (1881). History of Nevada: with illustrations and biographical sketches of its prominent men and pioneers. Oakland, California: Thompson and West. ISBN 978-0331951721. OCLC 4323478.
- Ansari, Mary B. (1989). Mines and Mills of the Comstock Region of Western Nevada. Reno, Nevada: Camp Nevada. ISBN 978-0933504073. LCCN 89-81042. OCLC 21340434.
- Lord, Eliot (1883). Comstock Mining and Miners. Washington Government Printing Office. OCLC 1194407.
