= Dayton, Nevada =

- Census-designated place
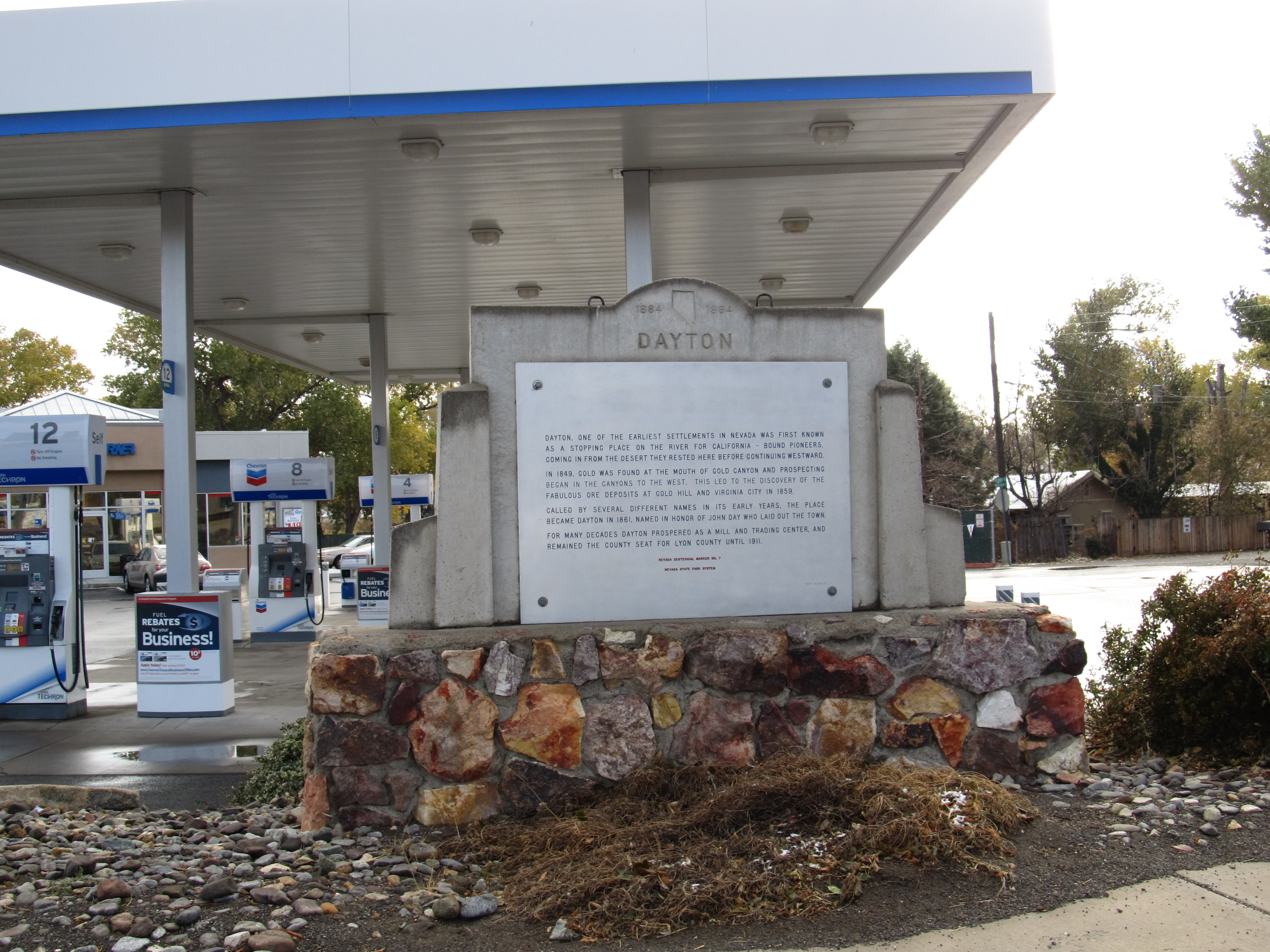

- Location of Dayton, Nevada
- Coordinates: 39°15′6″N 119°33′43″W
- Country: United States
- State: Nevada
- County: Lyon

Area
  - Total: 34.91 sq mi (90.42 km^{2})
  - Land: 34.90 sq mi (90.39 km^{2})
  - Water: 0.012 sq mi (0.03 km^{2})
- Elevation: 4,397 ft (1,340 m)

Population (2020)
  - Total: 15,153
  - Density: 434.2/sq mi (167.64/km^{2})
- Time zone: UTC-8 (Pacific (PST))
  - Summer (DST): UTC-7 (PDT)
- ZIP code: 89403
- Area code: 775
- FIPS code: 32-17500
- GNIS feature ID: 0856226

Nevada Historical Marker
- Reference no.: 7

Dayton is an unincorporated community and census-designated place (CDP) in Lyon County, Nevada, United States. The population was 15,153 at the 2020 census. Dayton is the second-oldest Nevada settlement, after Genoa, and is home to the oldest hotel in the state.

== History ==
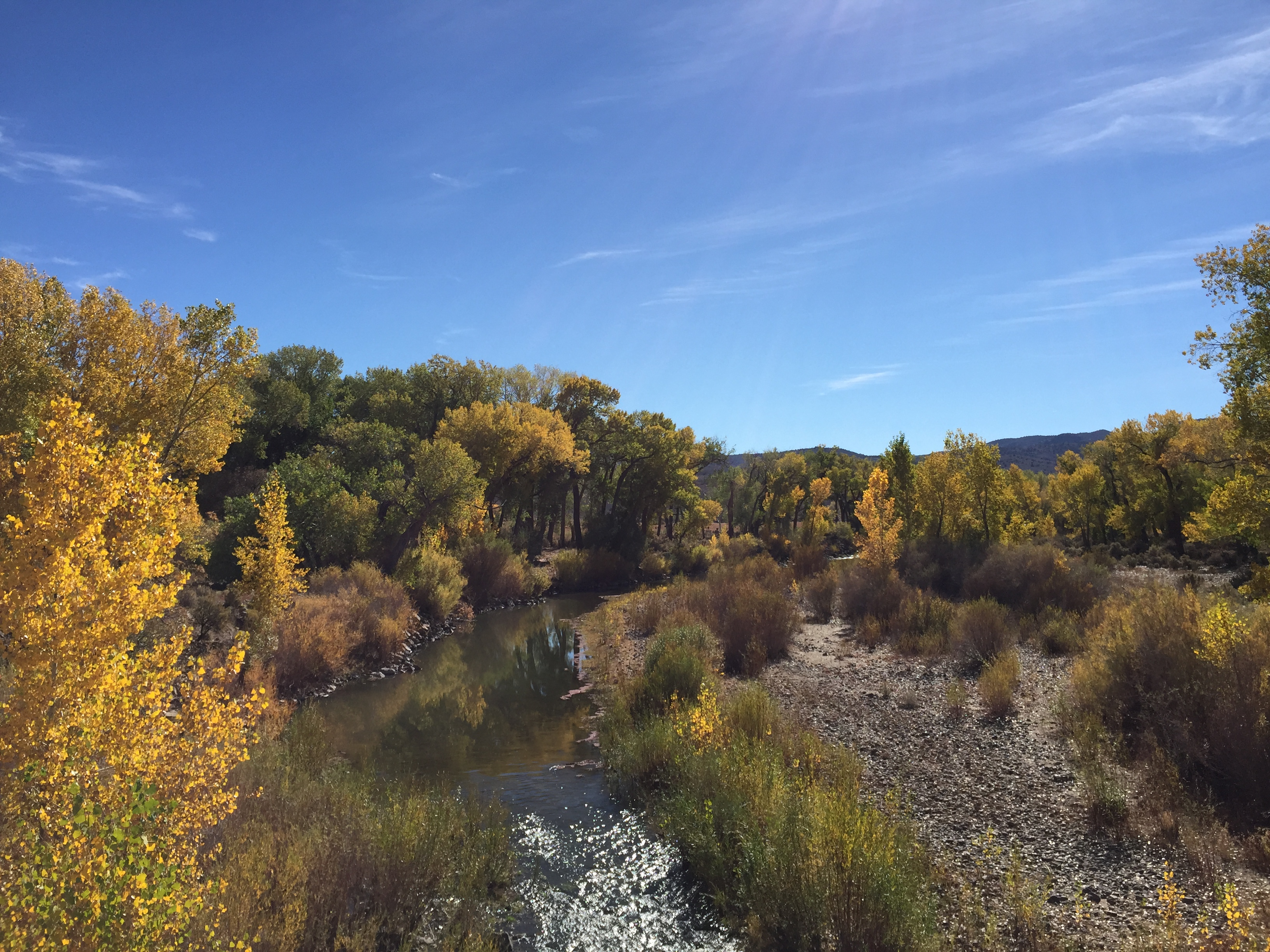
The Carson River in Dayton

Dayton is at the western end of the Twenty-Six Mile Desert at a bend in the Carson River. Immigrants stopping there for water would decide whether to follow the river south or continue west, giving the location its first name, Ponderers Rest. In 1849, Abner Blackburn, while heading for California, discovered a gold nugget in nearby Gold Creek, a tributary of the Carson River.

By 1850, placer miners settled at the mouth of Gold Cañon, working sand bars deposited over the millennia along the path of the creek. At first the settlement was just called "Gold Cañon" or "Gold Cañon Flat". Throughout the 1850s, Dayton served as the commercial hub for miners working in the canyon. In 1857 many Chinese miners came to the area to avoid mining taxes directed at the Chinese in California. With the 1859 discovery of the Comstock Lode, newly founded Gold Hill and Virginia City, 6 miles (10 km) to the north, assumed prominence and most miners headed up the cañon. By 1860 the town was primarily occupied by Chinese miners and it was called "China Town" in the U.S. census of that year. However, soon people began to realize there was more profit in providing milling, goods, and services to the miners and thus came or returned to the area.

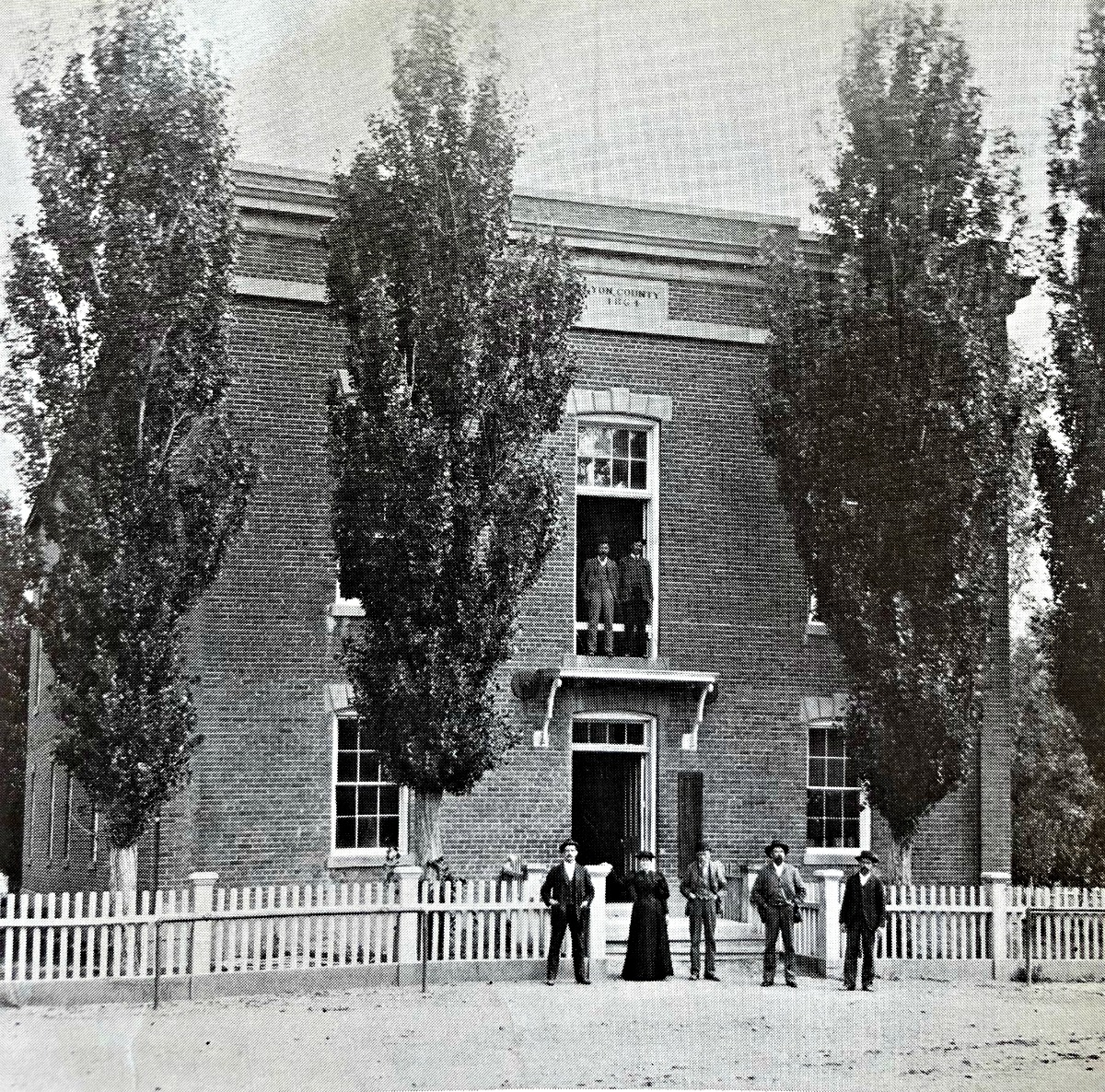
Dayton courthouse, built in 1864

In 1861, the town officially adopted the name "Dayton", after John Day, a local surveyor who was later elected Surveyor General of Nevada in 1868, 1870, and 1874. On November 29, 1861, Dayton became the governmental seat for Lyon County. Because of the availability of water from the Carson River, it soon became the first major milling center of the Comstock, and grew rapidly—from 78 residents in 1860 to 2,500 in 1865. Its 1864 courthouse was one of the first in Nevada.

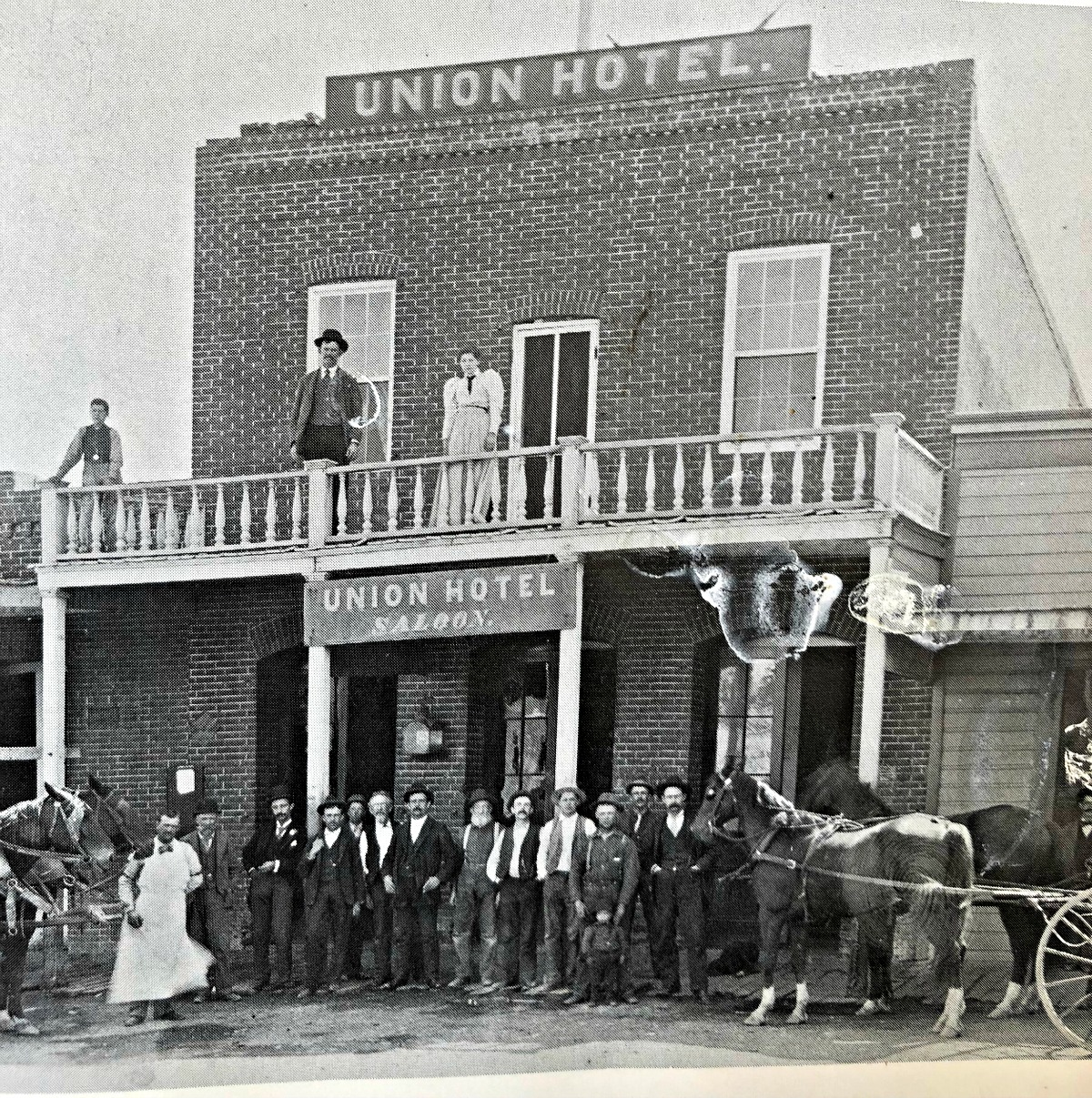
Union Hotel, Dayton, built in the early 1870s

In 1866 and 1870 devastating "Great Fires" in Dayton greatly reduced the size of the town. The 1869 opening of the Virginia and Truckee Railroad shifted ore processing upstream to the Carson River Canyon, but Dayton continued to serve as a lesser center of commerce and government. Nonetheless, in the 1870s it was a much quieter, less prosperous town. The coming of the Carson & Colorado Railroad in 1881 brought back some prosperity to Dayton, but the population nonetheless hovered around 500 residents until after World War I.

In 1909, fire destroyed the Lyon County Courthouse. Residents of the growing agricultural community of Yerington to the south called for a shift of the Lyon County seat, which occurred in 1911, leaving Dayton with a shrinking economy and population. By the 1920s, the Lincoln Highway was bringing some tourists to Dayton, but the town remained a quiet reminder of a time when Nevada's gold and silver strikes captured national attention. It did not surpass its 1865 peak population of 2,500 until 1930.

In 1961, Dayton won fame as a setting for John Huston's film, The Misfits, the last movie appearances of Clark Gable and Marilyn Monroe. Beginning in the 1990s, Dayton experienced phenomenal growth as residential development expanded on the east side of the Carson River. The historic part of Dayton is within the Comstock Historic District, featuring a small but impressive main street, the monumental Odeon Hall, and a charming local museum located in an 1865 schoolhouse that is the oldest in Nevada in its original location.

Dayton claims the designation of Nevada's oldest settlement, a title disputed by the residents of Genoa. Dayton points to the fact that when the wagon train of pioneer Lucena Parsons stayed at the mouth of Gold Cañon (now Dayton) for several weeks waiting for the snow to leave the Sierra Nevada, she recorded in her journal that Colonel Reese and his party passed along the Carson River as they headed for the Sierra foothills to establish Mormon Station (today's Genoa). She had noted also that upon the wagon train's arrival about three weeks earlier, more than 200 miners were working the cañon. Today's residents of Genoa point to the region's first post office and several other aspects of town government and note that their community deserves the title of "Nevada's first town," a claim that Dayton residents do not care enough to dispute.

Dayton is listed as Nevada Historical Marker 7.

== Geography ==
Dayton is located in western Lyon County at 39°15′6″N 119°33′43″W (39.251707, -119.561943). It is bordered to the northwest by Silver City and about 12 miles to the east of Carson City, the state capital. U.S. Route 50 passes through the community, leading east 50 miles (80 km) to Fallon and west 12 miles (19 km) to Carson City.

According to the United States Census Bureau, the Dayton CDP has a total area of 31.5 square miles (81.6 km^{2}), of which 0.01 square miles (0.03 km^{2}), or 0.04%, are water.

== Demographics ==
Historical population
Census	Pop.	Note	%±
1970	826		—
1980	4,376		429.8%
2000	5,907		—
2010	8,964		51.8%
2020	15,153		69.0%
U.S. Decennial Census

=== 2020 census ===
As of the 2020 census, Dayton had a population of 15,153. The median age was 45.5 years. 21.0% of residents were under the age of 18 and 23.8% of residents were 65 years of age or older. For every 100 females there were 101.4 males, and for every 100 females age 18 and over there were 97.8 males age 18 and over.

85.2% of residents lived in urban areas, while 14.8% lived in rural areas.

There were 5,859 households in Dayton, of which 28.6% had children under the age of 18 living in them. Of all households, 56.4% were married-couple households, 16.9% were households with a male householder and no spouse or partner present, and 18.6% were households with a female householder and no spouse or partner present. About 20.1% of all households were made up of individuals and 10.7% had someone living alone who was 65 years of age or older.

There were 6,114 housing units, of which 4.2% were vacant. The homeowner vacancy rate was 1.5% and the rental vacancy rate was 3.7%.

Racial composition as of the 2020 census
Race	Number	Percent
White	11,738	77.5%
Black or African American	77	0.5%
American Indian and Alaska Native	206	1.4%
Asian	281	1.9%
Native Hawaiian and Other Pacific Islander	46	0.3%
Some other race	1,080	7.1%
Two or more races	1,725	11.4%
Hispanic or Latino (of any race)	2,607	17.2%

=== 2000 census ===
As of the 2000 census, there were 5,907 people, 2,198 households, and 1,674 families residing in the CDP. The population density was 186.3 inhabitants per square mile (71.9/km^{2}). There were 2,322 housing units at an average density of 73.2 units per square mile (28.3 units/km^{2}). The racial makeup of the CDP was 91.4% White, 0.4% African American, 1.0% Native American, 1.0% Asian, 0.2% Pacific Islander, 3.8% from other races, and 2.2% from two or more races. Hispanic or Latino of any race were 8.8% of the population.

There were 2,198 households, out of which 37.7% had children under the age of 18 living with them, 61.6% were married couples living together, 9.6% had a female householder with no husband present, and 23.8% were non-families. 18.1% of all households were made up of individuals, and 4.6% had someone living alone who was 65 years of age or older. The average household size was 2.69 and the average family size was 3.03.

In the CDP, the population was spread out, with 28.1% under the age of 18, 6.1% from 18 to 24, 29.0% from 25 to 44, 25.0% from 45 to 64, and 11.9% who were 65 years of age or older. The median age was 37 years. For every 100 females, there were 102.6 males. For every 100 females age 18 and over, there were 99.2 males.

The median income for a household in the CDP was $43,599, and the median income for a family was $46,859. Males had a median income of $33,038 versus $26,140 for females. The per capita income for the CDP was $18,417. About 5.3% of families and 6.7% of the population were below the poverty line, including 8.2% of those under age 18 and 5.5% of those age 65 or over.

== Economy ==
As of 2012, the greatest number of workers in Dayton (168) were employed in the retail trade industry followed by the accommodation and food service industry with 138 employees and manufacturing with 56 employees.

The retail trade industry provided $56,637,000 in sales, shipments, receipts or revenue in 2012, which the highest of all industry and is followed by the manufacturing industry, which had a value of $10,562,000 in sales, shipments, receipts or revenue.

== See also ==
- Republic of Molossia, a micronation near Dayton
