= Gold Hill, Nevada =

Town in Nevada

Coordinates: 39°17′26″N 119°39′27″W

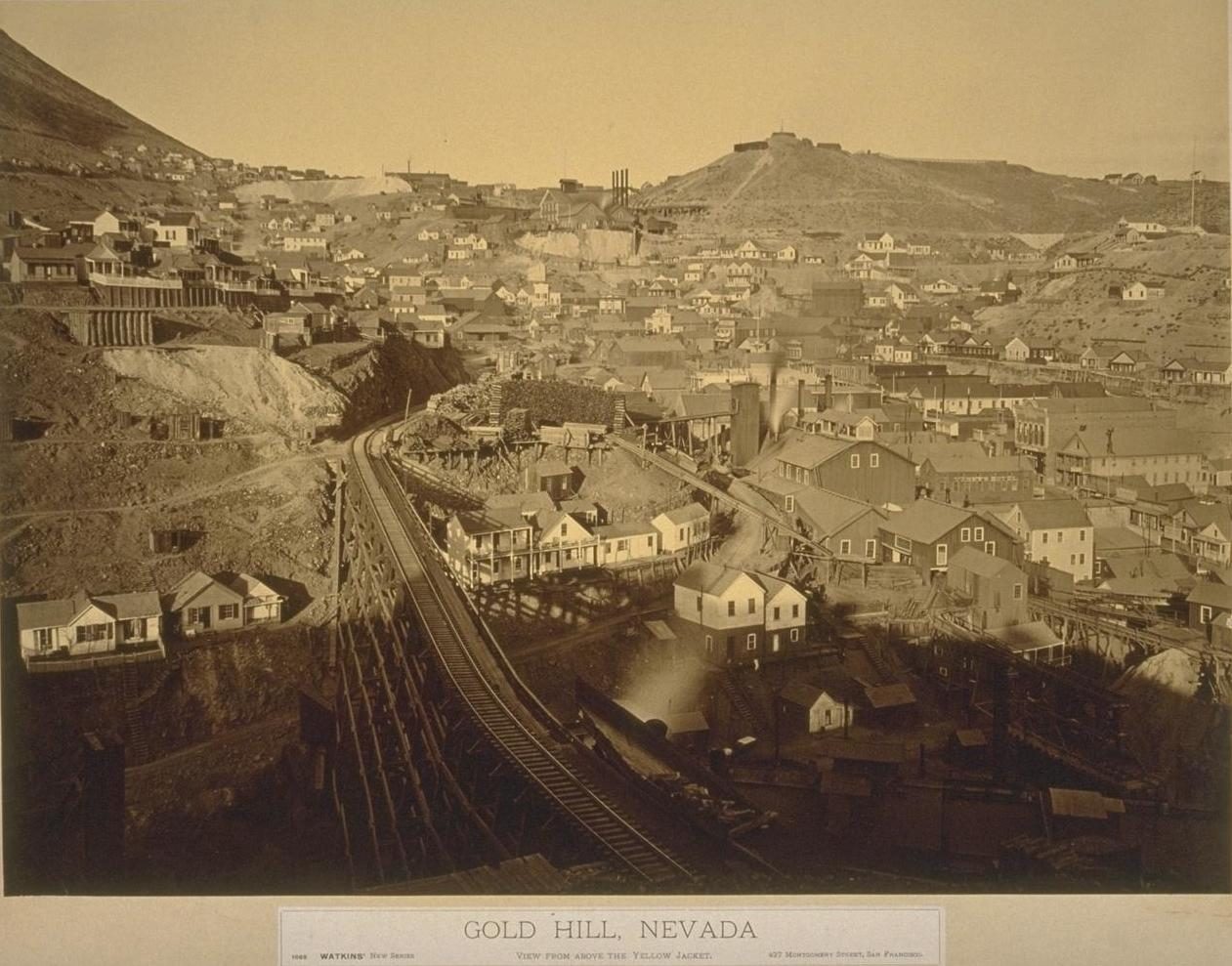
Gold Hill, late 1870s. Photo: Carleton Watkins

Gold Hill is an unincorporated community in Storey County, Nevada, United States, located approximately 1.5 miles (2.4 km) south of Virginia City. The town was established in 1859 following the discovery of gold. Gold Hill developed into a major mining and milling center on the Comstock Lode in the 1860s and 1870s, with mines such as the Yellow Jacket, Crown Point, Kentuck, and Belcher among the district's leading producers.

As Comstock mining started to decline in the late 1870s, Gold Hill entered a period of economic decline, with many mines and businesses closing by the end of the nineteenth century. Mining activity briefly revived during the 1920s, in connection with a cyanide mill at nearby American Flat. Although the original Virginia & Truckee Railroad ceased operations in the early twentieth century, the line was later reconstructed as a heritage railroad. Gold Hill is part of the Comstock Historic District and a tourist destination known for its historic buildings and restored railroad depot.

== Description ==
Gold Hill is an unincorporated community in Storey County, Nevada, United States, located approximately 1.5 miles (2.4 km) south of Virginia City, along the boundary between Storey and Lyon counties. The community had a population of 191 in 2005. Gold Hill is part of the Reno–Sparks Metropolitan Statistical Area. The town lies within the Comstock Historic District, which also includes Virginia City, Silver City, and part of Dayton. Surviving historic features include the Gold Hill Hotel (established in 1861), the former Bank of California building, the restored Virginia & Truckee Railroad depot, the Depression-era Crown Point Mill, and the remains of several mines and residences in varying states of preservation.

== History ==
=== Discovery and early development ===
A group of miners discovered gold here in early 1859 when they traveled from the mining town of Johnstown to investigate a small yellow hill that one of them had noticed on an earlier trip. The prospectors included James Finney, Alexander Henderson, John Bishop and John Yount. Early panning results––averaging around 15 cents (Note: equivalent to $5.37 in 2025 adjusted for inflation) of gold per pan––prompted the miners to establish a mining camp at the site. What the prospectors uncovered, and were unaware of at the time, was the southern section of the Comstock Lode. The group named the site, Gold Hill after the yellow hill where they discovered gold. When daily earnings from panning gold reached $20 (Note: equivalent to $716.67 in 2025 adjusted for inflation) a day, most of the miners from the towns of Johntown and Dayton moved to Gold Hill.

=== Mining and industry ===
Gold Hill became a major mining and milling center in the 1860s and 1870s. From the beginning, the district was known for its "Little Gold Hill Mines", which comprised the original claims of Finney, John Bishop, Henry Comstock and several others. These mines were the major producing mines of the Gold Hill District in the early 1860s. For the period, 1866–1876, the "Little Gold Hill Mines" produced approximately 160,000 tons, yielding about $3,520,000. Later, all these claims became part of the Consolidated Imperial Mine. In the early 1870s, the largest producers in the district were the Crown Point, Belcher and Yellow Jacket mines.

Gold Hill enjoyed prosperity throughout the early-to-mid 1870s. The town's population peaked at 8000 in 1877. Millions of tons of ore were produced in Gold Hill. The main producers were the Belcher, Confidence, Crown Point, Imperial, Kentuck, and Yellow Jacket mines.

==== Major Mines ====
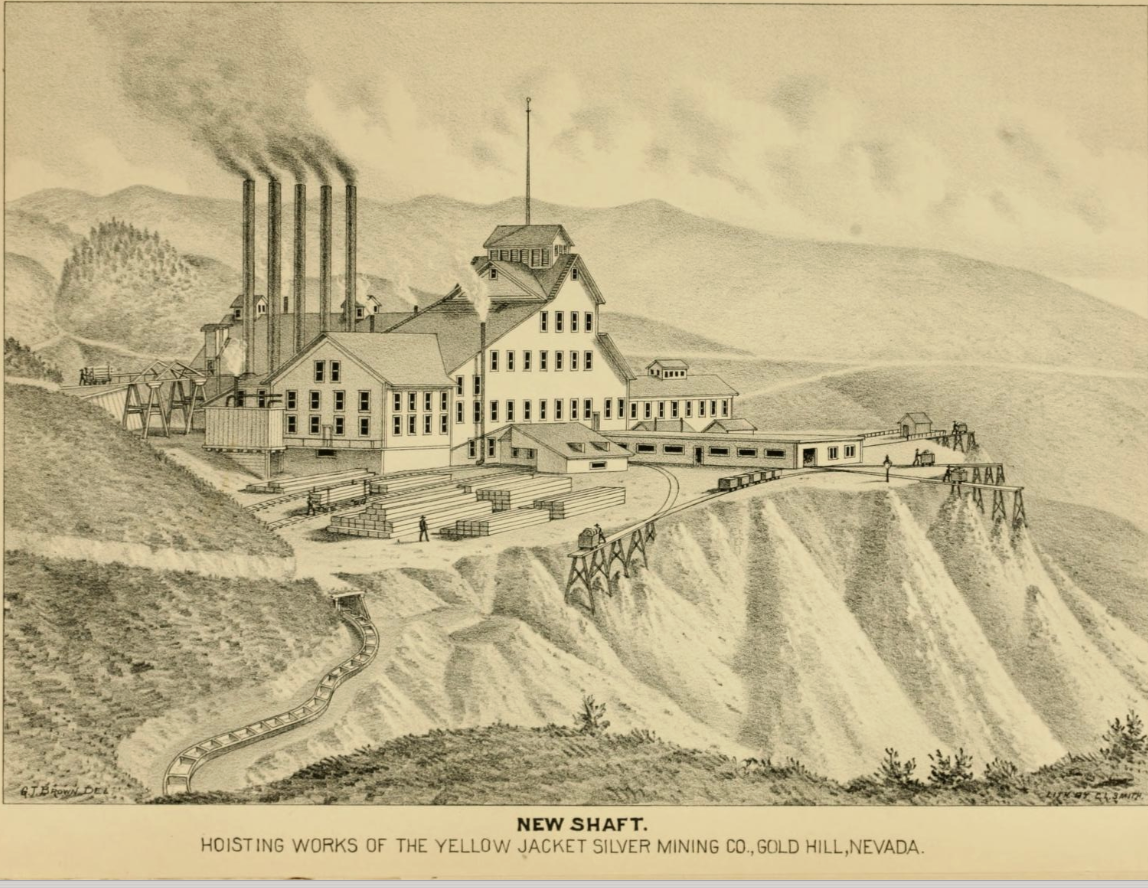
Yellow Jacket Mine

===== Yellow Jacket Mine =====
The Yellow Jacket mine was one of the largest and best producing gold mines in the area. It was located north of Gold Hill between the Consolidated Imperial and Kentuck mines. A 957-foot (292 m) mining claim was recorded in 1859 and first worked in the early 1860s. A catastrophic underground fire at the mine in April, 1869, started in the Yellow Jacket and spread to the Kentuck and the Crown Point mine, killing 37 miners. In 1915, the Yellow Jacket, Crown Point and Belcher Mines consolidated under the Jacket-Crown-Point-Belcher Mining Co. Total yield for the period 1864-1919 was $17,500,000.

===== Kentuck Mine =====
This major Comstock producing mine was located between the Yellow Jacket and the Crown Point mines at the mouth of the Crown Point Ravine. In 1859, a 95-foot claim was originally staked along the Comstock Lode. The mine became a major producer in the mid-1860s. From 1866 to 1869, the Kentuck was one of the most profitable mines on the Comstock. In 1866, the Kentuck shared a bonanza with the Yellow Jacket and Crown Point mines. Mining operations came to an end in the mid-1890s, following the decline of economically recoverable ore.

===== Crown Point Mine =====
The Crown Point was located on Gold Hill between the Kentuck and the Belcher mines. The mine's original claim, recorded in 1859, measured 540 feet (160 m). In 1871, a rich ore body shared with the Belcher mine was discovered. It became known as the "Crown Point-Belcher Bonanza." The bonanza produced about $60,000,000 between the two mines. In 1915, the Crown Point, Yellow Jacket and Belcher mines united to form the Jacket-Crown Point-Belcher Mining Co. In the mid-1920s, the United Comstock Mining Company was operating the mine. The Sutro Tunnel Coalition Company operated the mine successfully in the 1930s and early 1940s. Total production yields for the mine from 1864–1939 was reportedly $35,000,000.

===== Belcher Mine =====
The Belcher and the Crown Point mines were the largest producers on the Comstock Lode after the Consolidated Virginia and California mines. The Belcher mine was located approximately 1/4 mile (0.40 km) south of the Crown Point Mine in Gold Hill. A 1,040-foot (320 m) claim was recorded in 1859. In 1871, a significant ore deposit, later known as the Crown Point-Belcher Bonanza was discovered. The boundary between the two mines cut directly through the bonanza, dividing it evenly. The Belcher side of the bonanza was the more productive of the two. In 1915, the Crown Point, Yellow Jacket and Belcher mines united to form the Jacket-Crown Point-Belcher Mining Co. The mine was in operation through 1920.

==== Stamp mills ====
Stamp mills were required in a mining community for ore crushing and extracting of the precious minerals. The town of Gold Hill and the canyon below were lined with stamp mills during the height of mining production.

Among the earliest and largest mills were the Atlas; Empire; Imperial; Pacific; Petaluma; Piute; Rhode Island; and Stewart, Kirkpatrick and Co., all located in Gold Canyon.

=== Community and town life ===
The first building erected in Gold Hill was a small frame structure on Main Street in the summer of 1859. The next building was a small boarding house and restaurant. It was built of logs from the hills surrounding the town. The third building was a one-story frame house, 16 square feet (1.5 m^{2}), and was used as a grocery store. There were also several primitive shacks thrown together, in which many families made their homes. Most miners lived in tents and simple dwellings made of brush. In 1860, the census showed a population in Gold Hill of 638 men with 14 women and 179 dwellings.

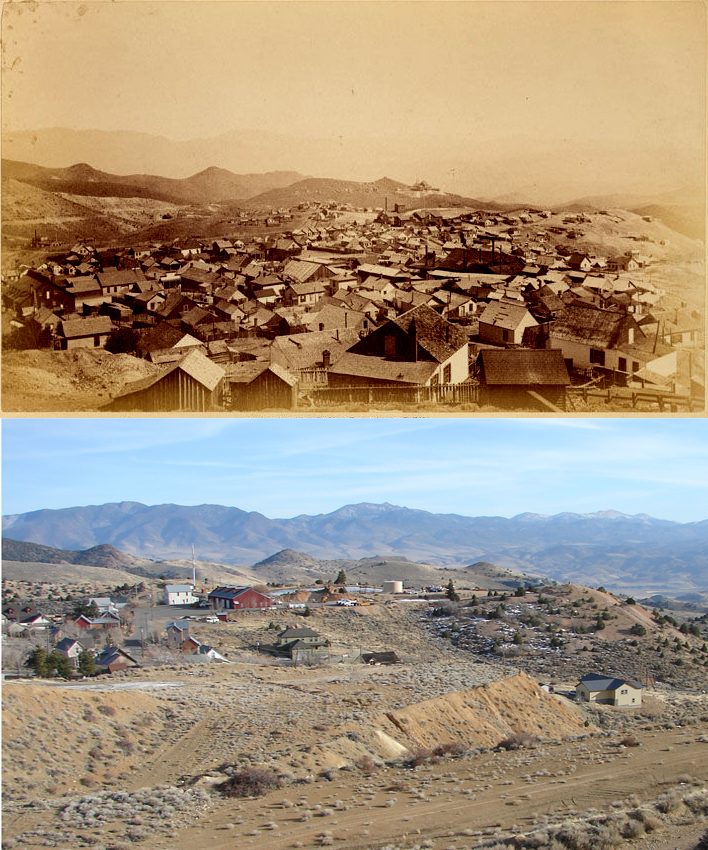
Gold Hill, Nevada: before 1900 (top) and in 2007. Both photos taken from (roughly) the same viewpoint.

The town was incorporated December 17, 1862, in order to prevent its annexation by its larger neighbor. The town's population expanded rapidly in the early 1860s at the same time that nearby Virginia City was also having a population explosion. By 1863, Gold Hill was a large town consisting of mines, mills, stores, homes, restaurants, offices, hotels and saloons.

Growth slowed in the late 1860s but picked up again with the construction in 1869 of the Virginia & Truckee Railroad and the discovery of the Crown Point-Belcher Bonanza in 1871.

Although in the shadow of neighboring Virginia City, Gold Hill, nonetheless enjoyed a lively entertainment industry. The Gold Hill Daily News was established in 1863, and Gold Hill enjoyed a theater by 1862. The demographic mirrored Virginia City where one third of the population was engaged in mining. Newspaperman Alfred Doten is associated with the town. His numerous journals, available at the University of Nevada, Reno Special Collections, provide a rich and detailed history of his experiences in the American West during the nineteenth century.

=== Decline and twentieth-century revival ===
By the late 1870s, mining activity across the Comstock Lode had begun to decline. The town reached a population of about 8,000 in 1877, after which the town entered a long period of decline. In the late 1870s, Gold Hill began a steady decline. As mining production dininished, mines and businesses gradually closed.

Gold Hill experienced a brief revival during the 1920s, when a large cyanide mill was established at nearby American Flat, and several of the closed mines were reworked. Despite this renewed activity, long-term decline continued. The Virginia & Truckee Railroad ceased operations in 1938, its tracks were removed in 1941. The post office finally closed in 1943.

=== Heritage railroad ===
In 1976, Bob Gray, a former Marine Corps photographer during World War II and a longtime admirer of the Virginia & Truckee Railroad, purchased a section of the abandoned railway line between Virginia City and a point approximately 2 miles (3.2 km) to the south. He laid track along the original right-of-way and began operating a steam-powered tourist railroad.

The track was extended to Gold Hill in 1992, and in 1994 the Gold Hill Historical Society was established to preserve the Gold Hill depot, one of the few wooden structures in the region that survived the 1875 fire in Virginia City. After ten years of applying for grants, lobbying, and collecting steel rail donations by the Gold Hill Historical Society, the mayor of Carson City approved the letting out to bid of a contract to reconstruct the railroad between Gold Hill and the Carson River, 15 miles (24 km) away.

== Notable people ==
- Emily Pitchford (1878–1956), pictorialist photographer. Born in Gold Hill.
- Marion Jones Farquhar (1879–1965), Olympic bronze medal winner and two-time U.S. Open tennis champion. Born in Gold Hill.
- Sarah Mower Requa (1829–1922), American philanthropist and California pioneer. Built a church in Gold Hill.

== Sources ==
- Angel, Myron, ed. (1881). History of Nevada: with illustrations and biographical sketches of its prominent men and pioneers. Oakland, California: Thompson and West. ISBN 978-0331951721. OCLC 4323478.
- Ansari, Mary B. (1989). Mines and Mills of the Comstock Region of Western Nevada. Reno, Nevada: Camp Nevada. ISBN 978-0933504073. LCCN 89-81042. OCLC 21340434.
- Eichin, Carolyn Grattan (2020). From San Francisco Eastward: Victorian Theater in the American West (Volume 1). University of Nevada Press. ISBN 978-1948908382. OCLC 1553719848.
- Lord, Eliot (1883). Comstock Mining and Miners. Washington Government Printing Office. OCLC 1194407.
