= Nevada State Route 531 =

Highway in Nevada

State Route 531
- College Parkway
- Former SR 531 highlighted in red

Route information
- Length: 1.645 mi (2.647 km)
- Existed: 1995–2011

Major junctions
- West end: US 395 Bus. in Carson City
- US 395
- East end: SR 525 in Carson City

Location
- Country: United States
- State: Nevada

Highway system
- Nevada State Highway System; Interstate; US; State; Pre‑1976; Scenic
← SR 530	→ SR 535

State Route 531 (SR 531) was a state highway in Carson City, Nevada. It followed a portion of College Parkway in the northern part of the city. Created by 1995, the highway was turned over to city control in 2011.

== Route description ==
SR 531 began at the intersection of College Parkway and North Carson Street in northern Carson City. From there, the route traveled east along College Parkway as a four-lane thoroughfare serving mostly residential areas. After about a mile (1.6 km), the highway passed under an interchange with U.S. Route 395. College Parkway continued eastward from here to a junction with Lompa Lane, near the Carson City Airport. SR 531 ended at this intersection, but College Parkway continued east as State Route 525.

== History ==
State Route 531 was added to the Nevada highway network on February 7, 1995.

The SR 531 designation previously extended further east on College Parkway to Airport Road, giving the highway a total length of 1.95 miles (3.14 km). By 2006, the section east of Lompa Lane had been reassigned to SR 525.

As early as 2009, a proposal was being considered by Carson City and the Nevada Department of Transportation transfer ownership and control of some state roadways to the city. In exchange, the transportation department would reduce the city's payments toward construction of the Carson City Freeway by $5 million. Portions of College Parkway were among the streets being considered in this plan. State control of SR 531 was relinquished to Carson City on July 11, 2011.

== Major intersections ==
This table shows major intersections at the time SR 531 was removed from the state highway system. The entire route was in Carson City.

mi	km	Destinations	Notes
0.00	0.00	US 395 Bus. (N. Carson Street)	
		US 395 – Reno, Minden	
1.65	2.66	Lompa Lane	
1.000 mi = 1.609 km; 1.000 km = 0.621 mi
