= Nevada State Route 525 =

Highway in Nevada

State Route 525
- College Parkway & Airport Road
- SR 525 highlighted in red

Route information
- Length: 1.323 mi (2.129 km)
- Existed: 1976–2011

Major junctions
- West end: SR 531 in Carson City
- East end: US 50 in Carson City

Location
- Country: United States
- State: Nevada

Highway system
- Nevada State Highway System; Interstate; US; State; Pre‑1976; Scenic
← SR 520	→ SR 529

State Route 525 (SR 525) was a short state highway in Carson City, Nevada. It covered a portion of College Parkway and all of Airport Road in the northern part of the city. Originally designated in 1976, it was turned over to local control in 2011.

== Route description ==
The route began at the intersection of Lompa Lane and College Parkway, the latter of which SR 525 followed eastward. The four-lane state highway was bordered by houses on the south and the Carson City Airport on the north. After traveling about 0.3 miles (0.48 km), College Parkway intersected Airport Road. The state route turned south onto the two-lane Airport Road here. Airport Road headed south through residential neighborhoods for approximately one mile (1.6 km) before intersecting U.S. Route 50, where State Route 525 ended.

== History ==
The State Route 525 designation was assigned to Airport Road in the 1976 renumbering of Nevada's state highway system.

By 2006, the College Parkway section of SR 525 was added to the route. This section was previously designated as part of State Route 531.

A proposal considered by Carson City and the Nevada Department of Transportation in 2009 laid the groundwork to remove SR 525 from the state's highway system. The plan proposed to relinquish some state roadways to the control of the city, with Airport Road and College Parkway both being considered. In exchange for taking ownership of the routes, the transportation department would reduce the city's financial contribution towards construction of the Carson City Freeway by $5 million. Both the College Parkway and Airport Drive sections of SR 525 were turned over to Carson City on July 11, 2011, eliminating the designation from the state highway system.

== Major intersections ==
This table shows major intersections at the time SR 525 was removed from the state highway system. The entire route was in Carson City.

mi	km	Destinations	Notes
1.77	2.85	Lompa Lane	
3.09	4.97	US 50 (E. William Street)	
1.000 mi = 1.609 km; 1.000 km = 0.621 mi
