= Nevada State Route 512 =

Highway in Nevada

State Route 512
- Kings Canyon Road, King Street; Division Street, W. Fifth Street
- SR 512 highlighted in red

Route information
- Length: 2.146 mi (3.454 km)
- Existed: by 1983–circa 2009

Major junctions
- West end: Kings Creek in Carson City
- East end: US 395 Bus. in Carson City

Location
- Country: United States
- State: Nevada

Highway system
- Nevada State Highway System; Interstate; US; State; Pre‑1976; Scenic
← SR 511	→ SR 513

State Route 512 (SR 512) was a state highway in Carson City, Nevada. It connected Kings Canyon west of Carson City to the state capitol using various city streets. The route dates to the mid-19th century, as part of a wagon trail linking Lake Tahoe and Carson City that was later incorporated into the Lincoln Highway. SR 512 was turned over to local control in 2010.

== Route description ==
The western terminus of SR 512 was on the western edge of Carson City near the foothills of the Sierra Nevada in Kings Canyon. It began on Kings Canyon Road just east of Canyon Drive, where the road passes over Kings Canyon Creek. From there, the route headed eastward around a hill to enter residential areas of Carson City. After 1.375 miles (2.213 km), the route intersected Ormsby Boulevard and turned into King Street. State Route 512 continued east another 0.590 miles (0.950 km) to Division Street, where the route turned south. The highway followed Division Street 0.178 miles (0.286 km) to West Fifth Street. SR 512 turned east on Fifth Street and traveled 0.139 miles (0.224 km) to its eastern terminus at South Carson Street (U.S. Route 395 Business/SR 529) just south of the state capitol complex.

== History ==
=== Early history ===
Kings Canyon Road has a history dating before white settlers came to the Eagle Valley, where Carson City now resides. It was originally a Washo Indian trail that crossed over the mountains separating the valley from Lake Tahoe. The trail became more prominent in the 1850s as would-be miners trekked west to California in search of gold. As the Comstock Lode contributed to the growth of areas around Carson City in the 1860s, the trail became an important part of the Bonanza road system, linking the burgeoning Comstock region and Placerville, California. Nevada's territorial government, realizing the need to improve access to and from the west, authorized Alfred Helm and Butler Ives to begin construction of a road through Kings Canyon in 1862. Their route, completed by November 1863 as the final segment of the Lake Tahoe Wagon Road, would become the preferred route connecting Carson City to Spooner's Station east of Glenbrook.

Kings Canyon Road was an early branch alignment of State Route 3.

After it was completed, the road saw little change or maintenance until the advent of automobiles, when the Bonanza system of wagon roads were adapted to serve the needs of vehicles. In 1913, Kings Canyon Road was selected by the Lincoln Highway Association as part of the Lincoln Highway's southern route over the Sierra Nevadas. Some improvements to the trail began in 1914, when the Carson Good Roads Association began placing route markers along the road. The road was later incorporated into Nevada's state highway system as part of State Route 3. Traffic on the route would decrease significantly starting in 1928, when a new paved route linking Carson City and Spooner's was constructed through Clear Creek Canyon to the south; SR 3 was moved to the new road, which eventually became part of U.S. Route 50.

=== The route today ===
The original Kings Canyon toll road is about 12 miles (19 km) long and is still open to travel. Within Carson City, SR 512 follows the alignment of the original road via portions of Kings Street and Kings Canyon Road. Outside the city west of the state highway terminus, the route is an unpaved forest road within the Humboldt-Toiyabe National Forest. The Forest Service promotes the road for its historical value, but no longer maintains the roadway. Travel by off-road vehicles or four-wheel drive vehicles with high clearance is highly recommended, as portions of the route are rugged, steep, and can be difficult to pass.

As for the route within Carson City limits, State Route 512 had been a designated highway since at least 1983. A proposal to transfer ownership of SR 512 from the Nevada Department of Transportation to Carson City had surfaced by 2007. This action was aimed to reduce the city's required financial contributions to NDOT for the construction of the Carson City Freeway. State Route 512 was removed from the state highway system by January 2010.
