= Nevada State Route 511 =

Highway in Nevada

State Route 511
- W. Washington Street
- SR 511 highlighted in red

Route information
- Length: 0.808 mi (1,300 m)
- Existed: by 1983–circa 2009

Major junctions
- West end: Ormsby Blvd in Carson City
- East end: US 395 Bus. in Carson City

Location
- Country: United States
- State: Nevada

Highway system
- Nevada State Highway System; Interstate; US; State; Pre‑1976; Scenic
← SR 501	→ SR 512

State Route 511 (SR 511) was a short state highway that followed West Washington Street in Carson City, Nevada. It was turned over to local control in 2010.

== Route description ==
The highway began at the intersection of West Washington Street and Ormsby Boulevard (SR 516) in a western residential area of Carson City. From there, the route followed the two-lane Washington Street eastward for 0.808 miles (1.300 km) to terminate at North Carson Street (U.S. Route 395 Business/SR 529).

== History ==
State Route 511 was designated a state highway by 1983.

A proposal to transfer ownership of several state highways, including SR 511, to Carson City had surfaced by 2007. This action was taken to reduce the city's financial obligation to the Nevada Department of Transportation for constructing the Carson City Freeway (future Interstate 580). By January 2010, State Route 511 had been removed from the state highway system.
