= Nevada State Route 520 =

Former state highway in Nevada

State Route 520
- Stewart Street
- SR 520 highlighted in red

Route information
- Length: 1.227 mi (1.975 km)
- Existed: 1976–2010

Major junctions
- South end: US 395 Bus. in Carson City
- North end: E. William St in Carson City

Location
- Country: United States
- State: Nevada

Highway system
- Nevada State Highway System; Interstate; US; State; Pre‑1976; Scenic
← SR 518	→ SR 525

State Route 520 (SR 520) was a short state highway in Carson City, Nevada. The route served the central portion of the city, providing access to several government buildings in the capitol district. It was turned over to local control in 2010.

== Route description ==
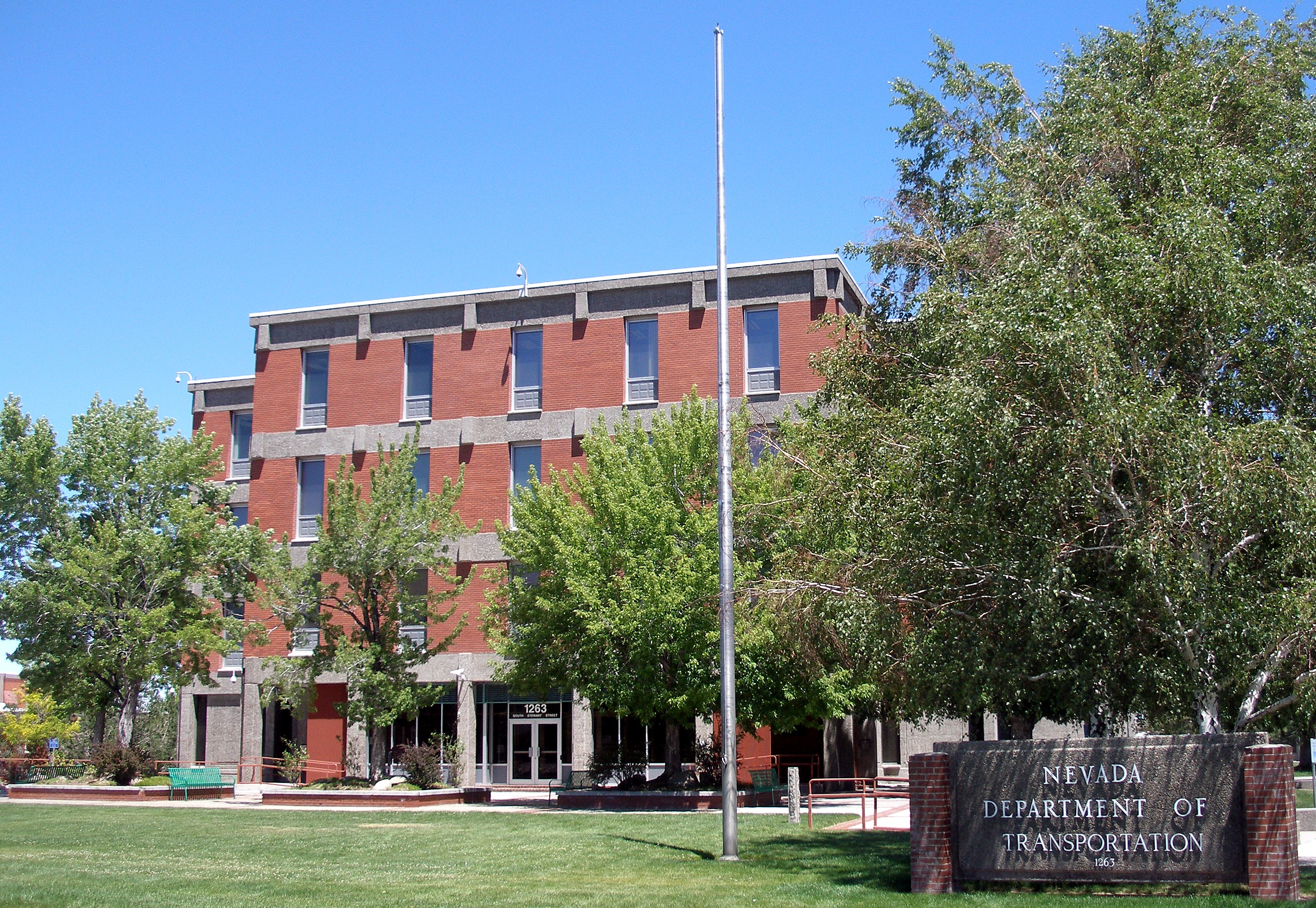
The Nevada Department of Transportation headquarters on Stewart Street (former SR 520) in Carson City

State Route 520 began on the southern end of Carson City at a junction with South Carson Street (U.S. Route 395 Business/SR 529) across from the Carson Ranger District office of the U.S. Forest Service. The route turned north from this intersection, passing headquarters for the Nevada Department of Motor Vehicles, Nevada Department of Public Safety, and Nevada Department of Transportation. Stewart Street runs parallel to the east side of Carson Street as it heads northward.

As SR 520 crossed East Fifth Street (SR 513), it entered the downtown district. The 0.2-mile (0.32 km) stretch from Fifth Street to Musser Street forms the eastern border of the main state capitol complex. In this section, the route passed behind major state buildings such as the Nevada Legislature, the Supreme Court of Nevada, and the Nevada State Capitol. The same segment of road hosts other state institutions like the Nevada State Library and Archives and buildings for the Nevada Department of Education.

Crossing over Musser Street, SR 520 moved into more commercial areas of the central city. Small businesses and parking lots line each side of Stewart Street. The route also passed behind a U.S. Department of the Interior building as it continued northward. State Route 520 reached its northern end at the intersection of East William Street (former SR 530) in the center of Carson City, although Stewart Street continued beyond the state highway terminus.

== History ==
State Route 520 became a signed state route when Nevada renumbered its state highways in 1976. There have been no major changes to the route since its inception.

In 2009, a plan was developed that would reduce Carson City's financial contribution towards the construction of the Carson City Bypass (future Interstate 580) in exchange for the Nevada Department of Transportation relinquishing some state-maintained highways to the city. The proposal was modeled after a similar 2008 deal. State Route 520 was deleted from the state highway system on June 24, 2010.

== Major intersections ==
This table shows major intersections at the time SR 520 was removed from the state highway system. The entire route was in Carson City.

mi	km	Destinations	Notes
0.00	0.00	US 395 Bus. (S. Carson Street)	
		E. 5th Street	Old SR 513
1.23	1.98	E. William Street	Old US 50 / SR 530
1.000 mi = 1.609 km; 1.000 km = 0.621 mi
