= Nevada State Route 530 =

Highway in Nevada

State Route 530
- William Street
- SR 530 highlighted in red

Route information
- Length: 1.464 mi (2.356 km)
- Existed: 1994–2010

Major junctions
- West end: US 395 Bus. in Carson City
- East end: I-580 / US 50 / US 395 in Carson City

Location
- Country: United States
- State: Nevada

Highway system
- Nevada State Highway System; Interstate; US; State; Pre‑1976; Scenic
← SR 529	→ SR 531

State Route 530 (SR 530) was a 1.464-mile-long (2.356 km) state highway in Carson City, Nevada. It followed a portion of William Street and was formerly signed as part of U.S. Route 50 (and U.S. Route 395 temporarily). The route was turned over to local control in 2010.

== Route description ==
SR 530 began near downtown Carson City at the intersection of Carson Street (US 395 Bus./SR 529) and William Street. From there, the route followed William Street east to its eastern terminus at a freeway interchange with US 50 and US 395 at the Carson City Bypass east of the city near Lompa Lane.

== History ==
US 395 was routed onto William Street with the completion of phase 1 of the Carson City Bypass in 2006. That concurrency was removed in September 2009 when phase 2A of the bypass opened to traffic.

In 2009, a plan was developed that would reduce Carson City's financial contribution towards the construction of the Carson City Bypass (future Interstate 580) in exchange for the Nevada Department of Transportation relinquishing some state-maintained highways to the city. The proposal, modeled after a similar 2008 deal, included the former Highway 50. State Route 530 was deleted from the state highway system on June 24, 2010.

== Major intersections ==
This table shows major intersections at the time SR 530 was removed from the state highway system. The entire route was in Carson City.

mi	km	Destinations	Notes
0.00	0.00	US 395 Bus. (Carson Street)	
		Stewart Street	Former SR 520
1.46	2.35	I-580 / US 50 / US 395 – Reno, Minden, Fallon, South Lake Tahoe	
1.000 mi = 1.609 km; 1.000 km = 0.621 mi
