= U.S. Route 395 Business =

U.S. Route 395 Business may refer to:

- U.S. Route 395 Business (Riverside, California)
- U.S. Route 395 Business (Colton–San Bernardino, California)
- U.S. Route 395 Business (Ridgecrest, California)
- U.S. Route 395 Business (Cartago–Olancha, California), running through Cartago and Olancha, California
- U.S. Route 395 Business (Carson City, Nevada)
- U.S. Route 395 Business (Reno, Nevada)
