= Nevada State Route 54 =

Former state highway in Nevada, United States

State Route 54

Route information
- Maintained by NDOT
- Existed: by 1935–1976 renumbering

Location
- Country: United States
- State: Nevada

Highway system
- Nevada State Highway System; Interstate; US; State; Pre‑1976; Scenic
← SR 53	→ SR 55

State Route 54 was a state highway in the U.S. state of Nevada, running west from U.S. Route 93 north of Panaca into Cathedral Gorge State Park. It was defined by 1935 and survived until the 1976 renumbering. Former SR 54 is now State Park Road LN12, owned by the state park but maintained by the Nevada Department of Transportation.
