= Nevada State Route 2C =

Unimproved road designation in Nevada, USA

State Route 2C

Route information
- Maintained by NDOT
- Existed: 1937–1972

Major junctions
- West end: Yerington
- East end: at Yerington (1937-1941); 22 miles southeast of Yerington (1941-1972)

Location
- Country: United States
- State: Nevada

Highway system
- Nevada State Highway System; Interstate; US; State; Pre‑1976; Scenic

State Route 2C was the former designation for an unimproved road between Yerington and SR 3 (now US 95) south of Schurz.

It was commissioned in 1937. Beginning in 1941, the eastern terminus was truncated to 22 miles (35 km) southeast of Yerington, leaving the route as a spur. It was decommissioned in 1972.
