= Nevada State Route 90 =

Former state highway in Nevada, United States

State Route 90
- SR 90 highlighted in red

Route information
- Length: 2.3 mi (3.7 km)
- Existed: 1960–1982

Major junctions
- West end: Rhyolite
- East end: SR 58 west of Beatty

Location
- Country: United States
- State: Nevada
- Counties: Nye

Highway system
- Nevada State Highway System; Interstate; US; State; Pre‑1976; Scenic

State Route 90 (SR 90) was a short state highway in Nye County, Nevada. Its western terminus was in the ghost town of Rhyolite. It traveled east to its eastern terminus at SR 58 (now SR 374). The route was designated in 1960 as an unimproved road to connect to Rhyolite from SR 58. It became graded by 1969, and was removed from the state highway system in 1982.

== Route description ==
All of the route was graded and inside Nye County. SR 90 began at the ghost town of Rhyolite. The route left the town, and into the desert as it traveled northeast. It curved east around small mountains north of SR 58 (SR 374). SR 90 then paralleled SR 58 for less than 1,000 feet (300 m), and ended at SR 58.

== History ==
SR 90 first appeared as an unimproved road on official state maps in 1960, connecting from Rhyolite to SR 58. It became graded by 1969. In 1978, Nevada began changing its state route numbers. The 1978-79 state highway map showed new route numbers along with the original numbers, but SR 90 was not shown with a new number. The route, having never been paved, was removed from the state highway system by 1982. By 2001, Rhyolite was reachable by a paved road that connects to SR 374 south of the town, instead of to the east as SR 90 did.

== Major intersections ==
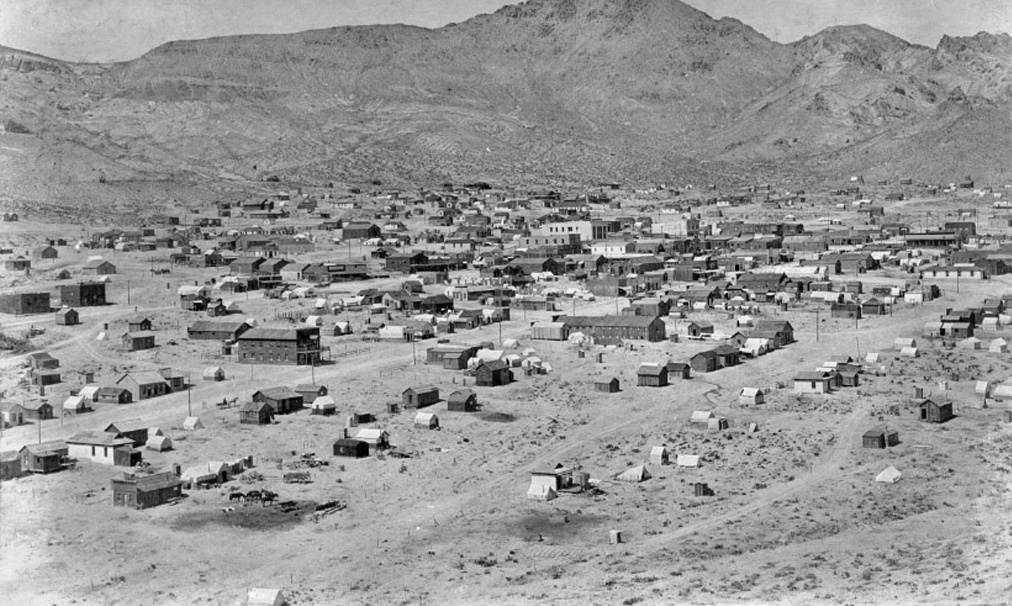
Rhyolite c.1905–1908

The entire route was in Nye County.

| Location | mi | km | Destinations | Notes |
|---|---|---|---|---|
| Rhyolite | 0.0 | 0.0 | Rhyolite | |
| | 2.3 | 3.7 | SR 58 | |
1.000 mi = 1.609 km; 1.000 km = 0.621 mi
