= Nevada State Route 579 =

Highway in Nevada

State Route 579
- Bonanza Road
- SR 579 highlighted in red, rest of Bonanza Road in blue

Route information
- Maintained by NDOT
- Length: 2.206 mi (3.550 km)
- Existed: 1976–present

Major junctions
- West end: US 95 Bus. / SR 599 in Las Vegas
- East end: Las Vegas Boulevard in Las Vegas

Location
- Country: United States
- State: Nevada
- County: Clark

Highway system
- Nevada State Highway System; Interstate; US; State; Pre‑1976; Scenic
← SR 574	→ I-580

State Route 579 is a state highway in Clark County, Nevada. It follows a portion of Bonanza Road near Downtown Las Vegas. The route encompasses a small portion of former State Route 5 and the entirety of former State Route 5A, and also carried U.S. 95 before it was relocated to its present freeway alignment.

== Route description ==
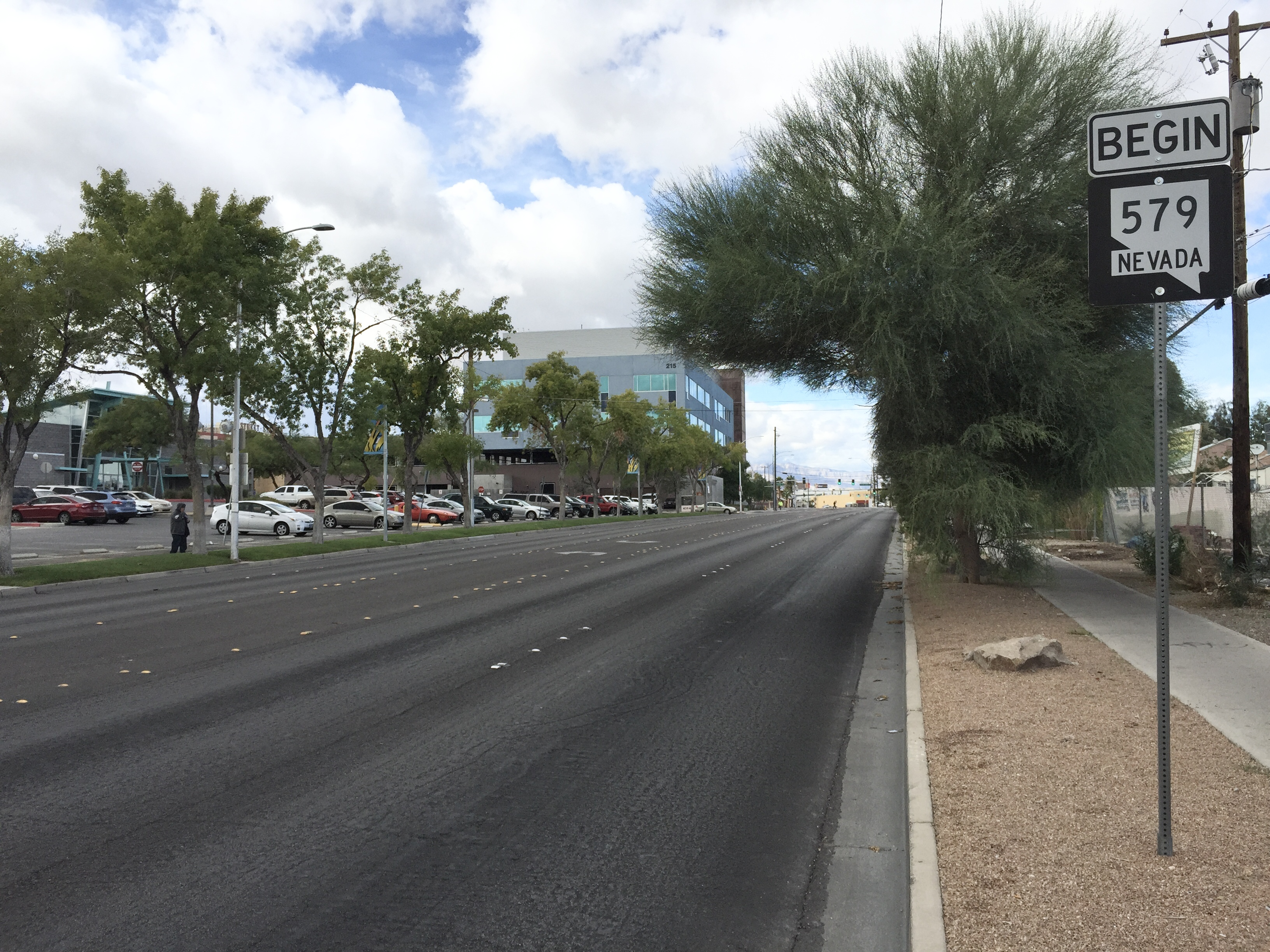
View at the east end of SR 579 looking westbound in 2015

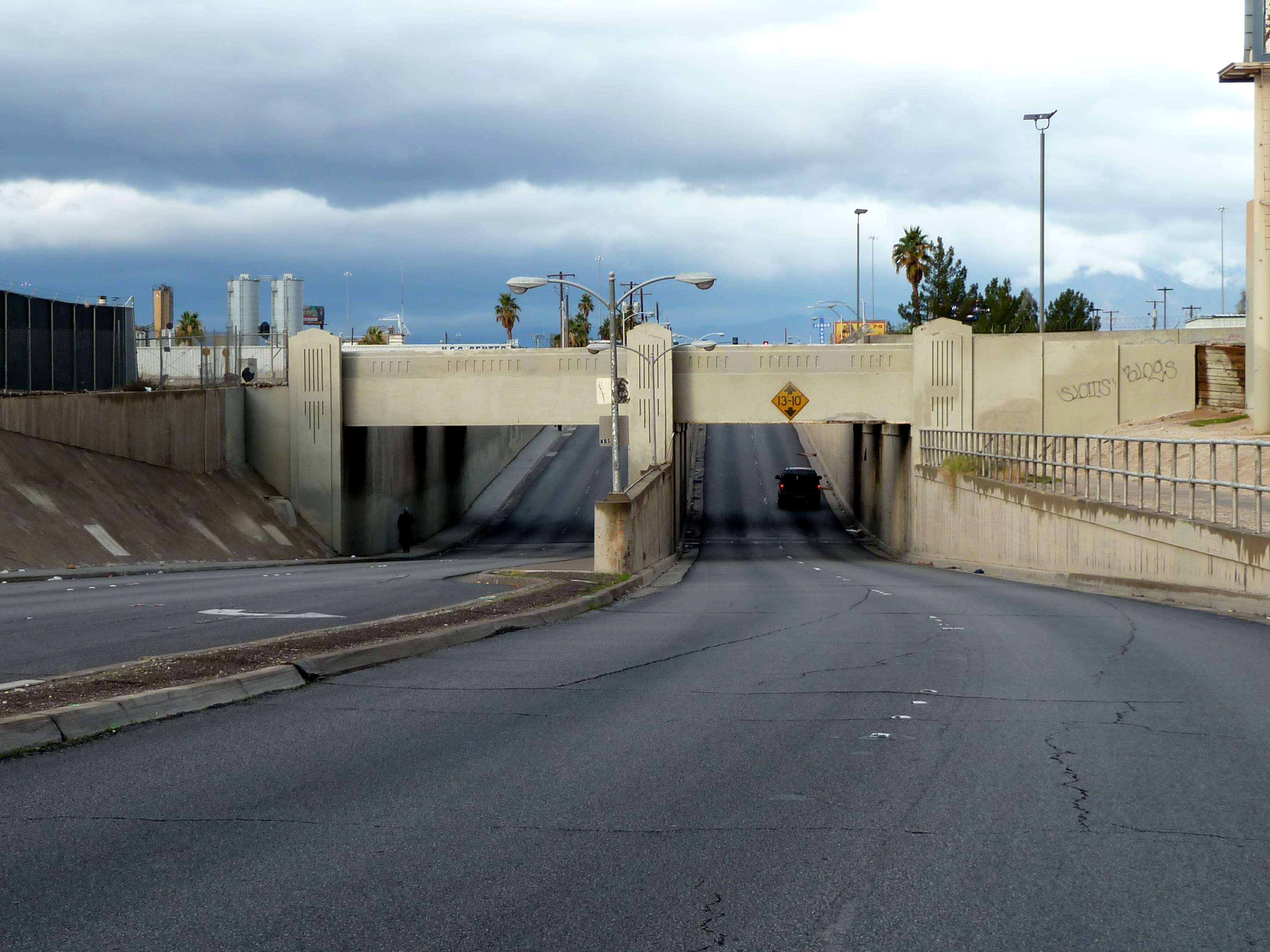
SR 579 as it goes under the Clark Avenue (now Bonanza Road) Railroad Underpass looking westbound in 2010

State Route 579 begins at the junction of Bonanza Road and Rancho Drive (SR 599, US 95 Business). From there, the highway heads east along Bonanza Road, traveling past various business including the offices of the Las Vegas Review-Journal newspaper. SR 579 passes underneath Interstate 15, U.S. Route 93 and the Union Pacific Railroad tracks (at the Clark Avenue Railroad Underpass) as it parallels Interstate 11, U.S. Route 93 and U.S. Route 95. The road then curves slightly southeast, aligning with the downtown street grid as it intersects Main Street. Bonanza Road then passes by various City of Las Vegas buildings, including the municipal pool and Las Vegas Fire & Rescue headquarters. State Route 579 ends at the intersection of Bonanza Road and Las Vegas Boulevard (former SR 604).

== History ==
SR 579 originated as part of State Route 5 and all of State Route 5A.

State Route 5, established by 1929, was a major Nevada route connecting south-central Nevada near Goldfield to the southern tip of the state via Las Vegas. That route traveled on what is now SR 579 between Rancho Drive and Main Street, comprising about 1.9 miles (3.1 km) of Bonanza Road. State Route 5A was also established along Bonanza Road by 1952; it followed the approximately 0.36 miles (0.58 km) of Bonanza Road between Main Street and Fifth Street (now Las Vegas Boulevard).

When US 95 was extended through Nevada in 1940, it was routed along many existing highways in Nevada, the longest of those routes being State Route 5. Thus, US 95 followed the Bonanza Road segment of SR 5 segment beginning in 1940. By 1968, the Las Vegas Expressway, a new facility designed to move traffic west of downtown, was beginning to take shape. By 1982 at the latest, US 95 was removed completely from Bonanza Road/SR 5 and onto the new expressway.

SR 5 and SR 5A were affected by the renumbering of Nevada's state highways that began on July 1, 1976. At that time, those two designations were removed from the state highway system. In the process, State Route 579 was established along the portions of Bonanza Road previously covered by the old highway routes.

== Major intersections ==
The entire route is in Las Vegas, Clark County.

mi	km	Destinations	Notes
0.0	0.0	US 95 Bus. (Rancho Drive, SR 599)	Western terminus; former US 95 north
1.8	2.9	Main Street	Former SR 601
2.0	3.2	Casino Center Boulevard (SR 602) / Veterans Memorial Drive	
2.2	3.5	Las Vegas Boulevard	Eastern terminus; former SR 604/US 91/US 93/US 95 south
1.000 mi = 1.609 km; 1.000 km = 0.621 mi

== Public transport ==
RTC Transit Routes 214 & 215 function on this road.
