= Nevada State Route 601 =

Arterial road in Nevada

State Route 601
- Main Street
- Main Street (former SR 601) highlighted in red
- NHS: Yes, between SR 159 (Charleston Boulevard) and Stewart Avenue

Major junctions
- South end: SR 604 / Saint Louis Avenue east in Las Vegas
- SR 159 in Las Vegas; Fremont Street (Experience) (SR 582 east) in Las Vegas; SR 579 in Las Vegas; SR 578 in Las Vegas
- North end: SR 604 / North 5th Street north in Las Vegas

Location
- Country: United States
- State: Nevada

Highway system
- Nevada State Highway System; Interstate; US; State; Pre‑1976; Scenic
← SR 599	→ SR 602

State Route 601 was a state highway in the U.S. state of Nevada, running along Main Street in Las Vegas. Its last section was turned over to the city in 2005. SR 601 ran along the full length of Main Street; both ends were at State Route 604 (Las Vegas Boulevard).

== Route description ==
Main Street (SR 601) begins at an intersection with South Las Vegas Boulevard and Saint Louis Avenue. At the intersection with Oakey Boulevard, former SR 601 becomes a one-way pair; the northbound direction retains the name Main Street, while the southbound direction is signed as Commerce Street. Further north, the pair intersects Charleston Boulevard; furthermore, the eastern terminus of SR 159's central segment is at Commerce Street. Main Street provides access to a pedestrianized Boulder Avenue and the Burlesque Hall of Fame. About 400 feet (120 m) north of Gass Avenue, the one-way pair merges as Main Street. It then provides access to the Carolyn G. Goodman Plaza, the Las Vegas City Hall, and numerous hotels and casinos. The intersection of Main Street and the Fremont Street Experience is the mathematical origin of Las Vegas's street address grid.

Main Street then goes under I-11 / US 93 / US 95 (former I-515) before intersecting Bonanza Road (SR 579, former US 95) and Washington Avenue (unsigned SR 578) before serving as the eastern boundary of the portion of the Las Vegas Paiute Tribe in Las Vegas. After an intersection with Owens Avenue, Main Street (and, thus, former SR 601) ends at a roundabout with Las Vegas Boulevard and North 5th Street.

Between Charleston Boulevard and Stewart Avenue, Main Street is part of the National Highway System (NHS), a network of highways that are considered essential to the country's economy, defense, and mobility. The NHS corridor continues east along Stewart Avenue. It then turns north onto Las Vegas Boulevard before ending at the interchange with I-11 / US 93 / US 95.

== Major intersections ==
The entire route is in Las Vegas, Clark County.

mi	km	Destinations	Notes
0.0	0.0	Saint Louis Avenue east	Continuation beyond southern terminus
0.0	0.0	SR 604 (South Las Vegas Boulevard)	Southern terminus of Main Street and SR 601
0.2	0.32	Oakey Boulevard	One-way pair: northbound direction continues as Main Street, while southbound direction is Commerce Street
0.3	0.48	Wyoming Avenue	
0.7	1.1	SR 159 (Charleston Boulevard)	Southern terminus of NHS route; Commerce Street currently serves as the eastern terminus of SR 159's central segment
1.1	1.8	400 ft (120 m) north of Gass Avenue	End of one-way pair
1.3	2.1	Bonneville Avenue	Provides access to Bonneville Transit Center
1.4	2.3	Goodman Way east	Pedestrian street; serves Las Vegas City Hall; western terminus of Goodman Way; former Clark Avenue
1.7	2.7	Fremont Street Experience east	Pedestrian street; western terminus of Fremont Street Experience; Main Street changes signage from "South Main Street" to "North Main Street"
1.9	3.1	Stewart Avenue east	NHS route turns east onto Stewart Avenue; western terminus of Stewart Avenue
2.1	3.4	SR 579 (Bonanza Road)	Former US 95 / SR 5
2.4	3.9	Washington Avenue (SR 578)	
2.6	4.2	Paiute Circle	Provides access to Las Vegas Paiute Tribe
3.0	4.8	Owens Avenue	
3.2	5.1	SR 604 (North Las Vegas Boulevard) / 5th Street north	Roundabout; northern terminus of Main Street and SR 601; southern terminus of 5th Street
1.000 mi = 1.609 km; 1.000 km = 0.621 mi: Concurrency terminus; Route transition
