= Carson Street =

Carson Street may refer to:

- Carson Street (Carson City, Nevada) or U.S. Route 395 Business
- Carson Street (Los Angeles) or 217th Street, in Carson, California
- Carson Street (Pittsburgh), part of Pennsylvania Route 837, in Allegheny County, Pennsylvania
