= Nevada State Route 513 =

Highway in Nevada

State Route 513
- E. Fifth Street
- SR 513 highlighted in red

Route information
- Length: 2.185 mi (3.516 km)
- Existed: 1976–2011
- History: SR 65 by 1973

Major junctions
- West end: US 395 Bus. in Carson City
- East end: Fairview Drive in Carson City

Location
- Country: United States
- State: Nevada

Highway system
- Nevada State Highway System; Interstate; US; State; Pre‑1976; Scenic
← SR 512	→ I-515

State Route 513 (SR 513) was a short state highway in Carson City, Nevada. The route was originally part of State Route 65, a longer highway that served the eastern outskirts of the city. SR 513 was turned over to Carson City in phases, and completely removed from the state highway system in 2011.

== Route description ==
State Route 513 began at the intersection of Fifth Street and South Carson Street (U.S. Route 395 Business/State Route 529) in downtown Carson City. At the northeast corner of this intersection is south end of the Nevada capitol complex. SR 513 headed east along East Fifth Street, passing by the Nevada Legislature building and other state facilities. Crossing Roop Street, the route entered a more residential area of the central city. After about a mile (1.6 km), SR 513 became a two-lane road through more open areas. Fifth Street then rises over the Carson City Freeway (U.S. Routes 50 and 395) and touches down next to Nevada State Prison. In 2011, the state highway ended at a roundabout intersection with Fairview Drive just past the prison facility.

Another segment of SR 513 existed separately from the main route on Fifth Street. This short section consisted of a 0.043-mile (0.069 km) bridge over the Carson River on Deer Run Road. This segment was removed from SR 513 in 2010.

== History ==
SR 513 was previously designated as State Route 65.

SR 513 had been a part of Nevada's state highway system since at least 1951. By this time, the route had been defined in state laws as heading east from State Route 3 (Carson Street) to the Nevada State Prison, then turning south and east to the Carson River. That general route had been established as a road by 1937, and was shown on Nevada's official highway maps as State Route 65 by 1973. The route appears to have followed what is now Fifth Street and Carson River Road.

The SR 65 designation stayed in place until Nevada officials began renumbering the state's highways on July 1, 1976. On that date, State Route 513 was the new number assigned to the highway. This change was seen on the state highway map in 1982.

After becoming SR 513, the route remained unchanged for many years. The road was realigned west of the state prison in 2008-09, as the new bridge over US 50/395 was constructed.

A transfer of ownership of several state highways to Carson City's control was proposed by 2007, in order to reduce the amount of money the city was supposed to pay to the Nevada Department of Transportation for the construction of the Carson City Freeway (future Interstate 580). Under this plan, the portion of State Route 513 on Carson River Road and on Fifth Street east of the Fairview Drive roundabout was removed from the state highway system on May 28, 2009. The remainder of East Fifth Street was turned over to Carson City control on July 11, 2011, eliminating SR 513 from the state highway system.
