= Nevada State Route 3C =

Former state highway in Nevada, United States

State Route 3C

Route information
- Length: 57 mi (1946 length) (92 km)
- Existed: mid 1940s–circa 1982

Major junctions
- South end: California state line southwest of Hawthorne (1946-73); Lucky Boy Road in Mineral County (1973-81)
- North end: SR 3 (now SR 208) south of Yerington

Location
- Country: United States
- State: Nevada

Highway system
- Nevada State Highway System; Interstate; US; State; Pre‑1976; Scenic

State Route 3C (SR 3C) was the former route number for Walker Road, an unimproved road that ran from the California state line southwest of Hawthorne (where it becomes Bodie Road) to SR 208 south of Yerington.

SR 3C was commissioned in the mid-1940s. The route underwent no significant changes until 1973, when the southern terminus was moved 8 miles (13 km) north to Lucky Boy Road in Mineral County. SR 3C was decommissioned by 1982.
