= Clark Avenue Railroad Underpass =

- U.S. National Register of Historic Places
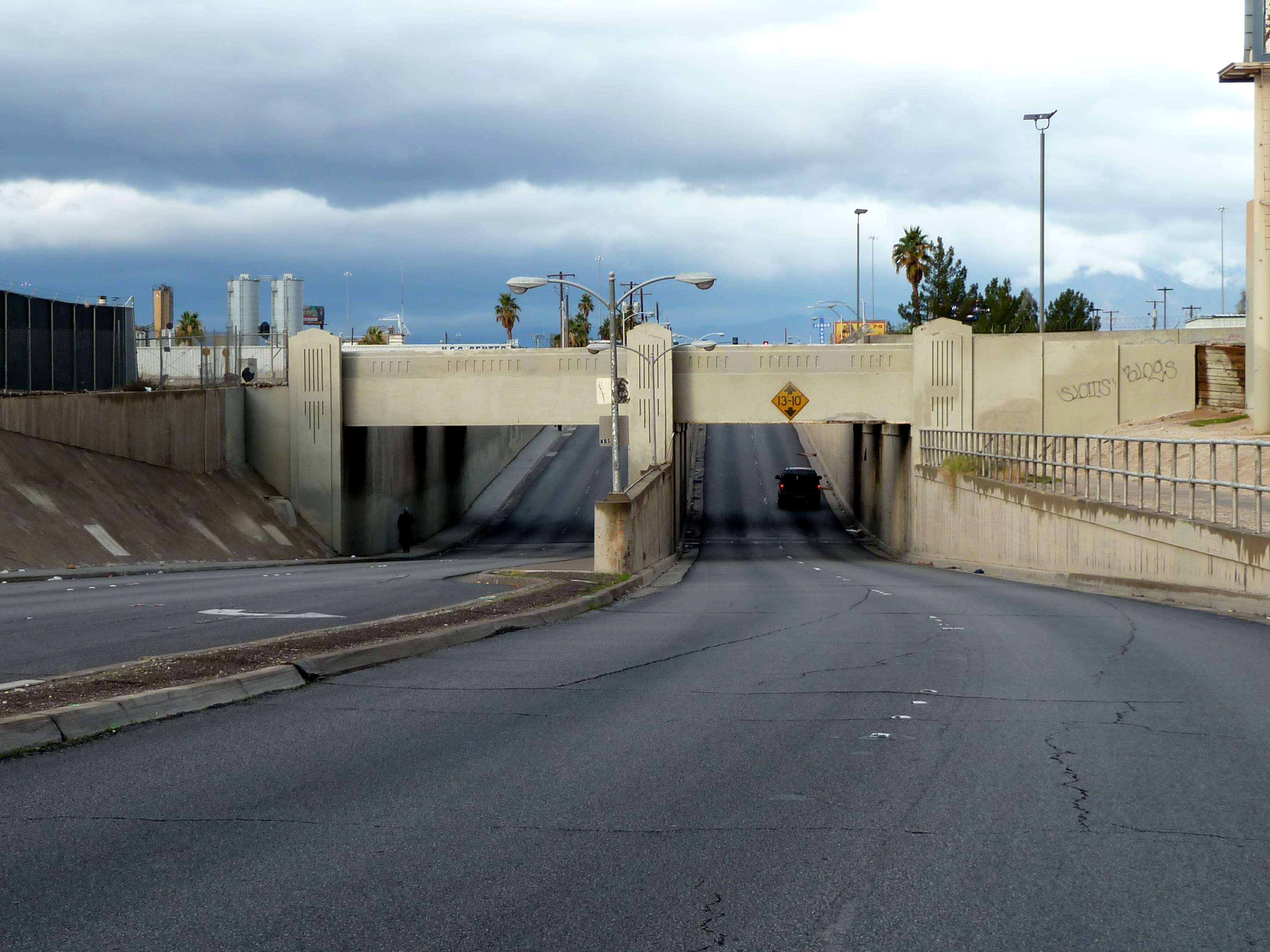
- Location: W. Bonanza Road at the Union Pacific Railroad tracks Las Vegas, Nevada
- Coordinates: 36°10′38″N 115°08′40″W
- Built: 1936
- Architect: Nevada Department of Highways and Union Pacific Railroad
- Architectural style: Art Deco
- NRHP reference No.: 03001509
- Added to NRHP: January 28, 2004

The Clark Avenue Railroad Underpass, also known as the Bonanza Underpass, is a bridge and underpass in Las Vegas, Nevada, United States that is listed on the National Register of Historic Places. The bridge is so named since at the time of construction it crossed Clark Avenue which was later renamed to Bonanza Road. The underpass is currently part of Nevada State Route 579.

== Historic significance ==
It is significant as the underpass allowed for access between Las Vegas and the settlements west of the city. Previously, it was a dangerous undertaking to cross the Union Pacific Railroad (ex-San Pedro, Los Angeles and Salt Lake Railroad) tracks.

== History ==
The bridge was constructed in 1937 by the Works Progress Administration. The structure has changed over time, primarily due to a widening project on Bonanza Road.
