= Nevada State Route 374 =

State highway in Nevada, United States

State Route 374
- Death Valley Road
- SR 374 highlighted in red

Route information
- Maintained by NDOT
- Length: 8.840 mi (14.227 km)
- Existed: July 1, 1976–present

Major junctions
- South end: Death Valley Road at Death Valley National Park
- North end: US 95 in Beatty

Location
- Country: United States
- State: Nevada
- County: Nye

Highway system
- Nevada State Highway System; Interstate; US; State; Pre‑1976; Scenic
← SR 373	→ SR 375

State Route 374 (SR 374) is a state highway in Nye County, Nevada, United States. It serves as Nevada's gateway to Death Valley National Park, connecting the park to Beatty. The highway was known as State Route 58 prior to 1976.

== Route description ==
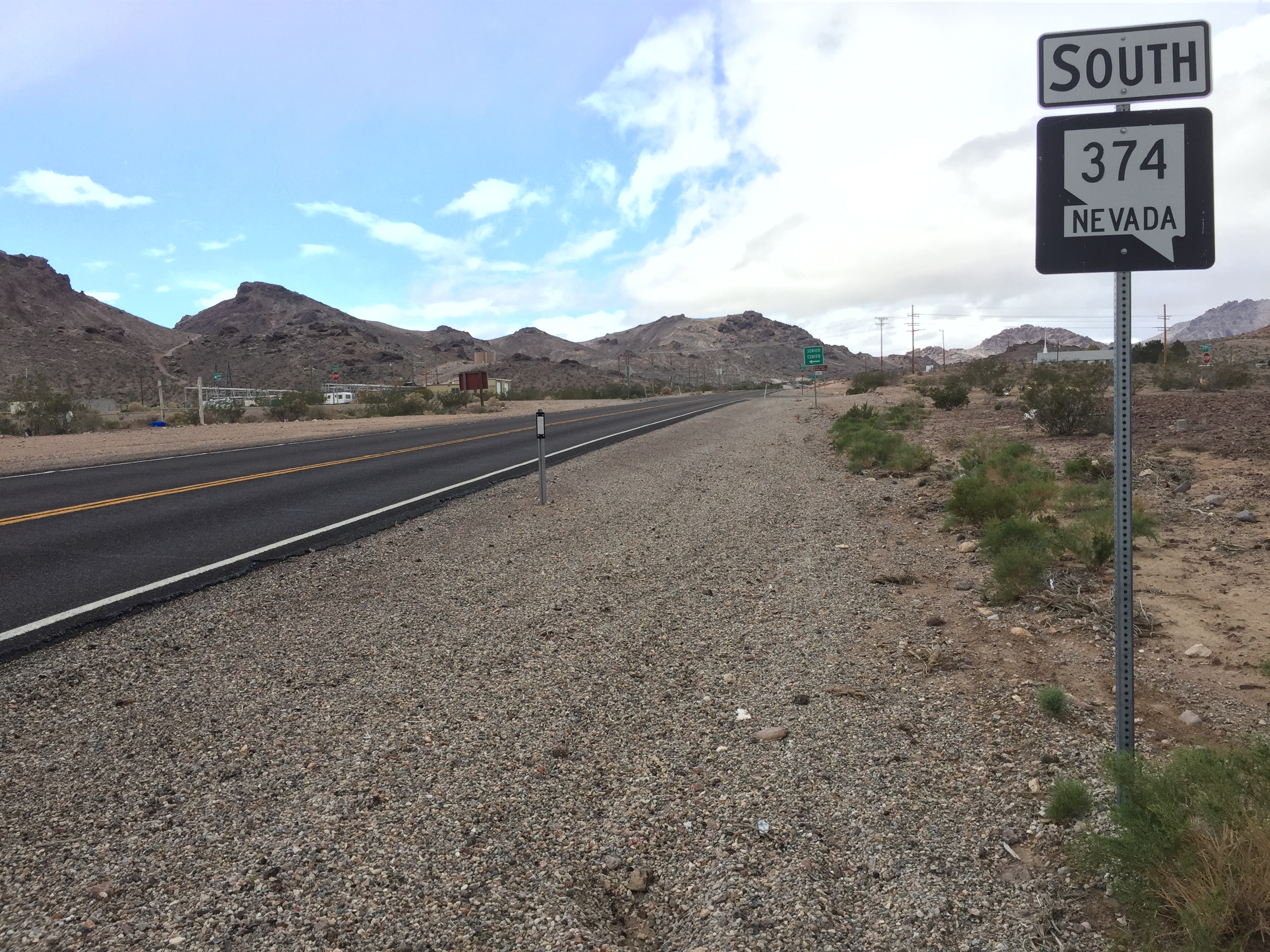
View from the north end of SR 374 looking southbound as seen in 2015

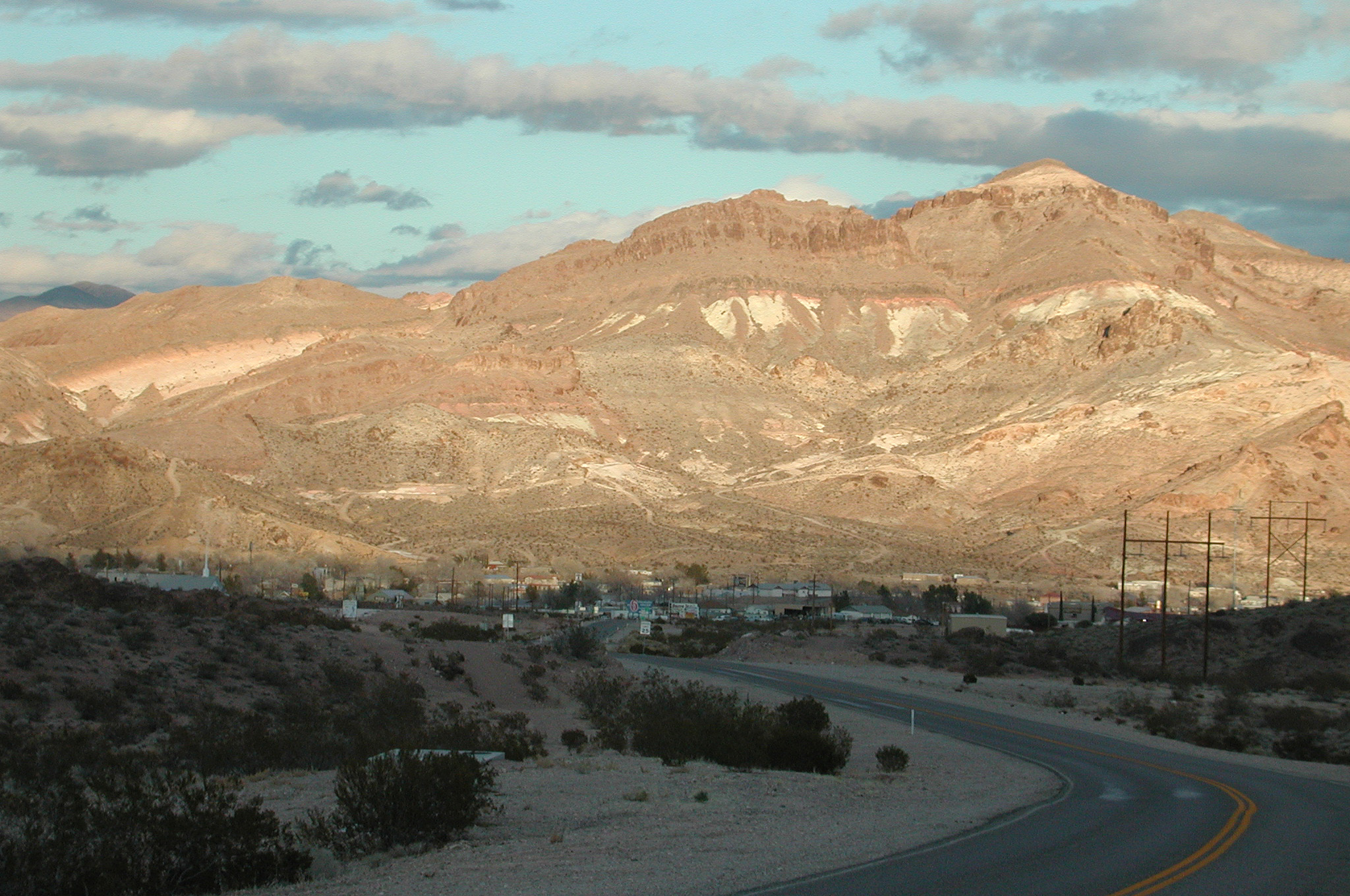
SR 374 entering Beatty as seen in 2009

SR 374 begins at the boundary to the Nevada portion of Death Valley National Park in Nye County. From there, it runs due northeast across the open desert. The route curves eastward as it passes through the mountains southwest of Beatty. The road becomes Main Street as it enters the town's southern limits. The route ends at US 95, where Main Street intersects Second Street. The route terminates in the northwest regions of the Amargosa Desert, and Amargosa Valley.

== History ==
SR 374 was formerly known as State Route 58

The highway first appeared on Nevada state highway maps as State Route 58 in 1937.

In the 1976 renumbering of Nevada's state highways, the route was reassigned to SR 374. The number change was first seen on state maps in 1978.

== Major intersections ==
The entire route is in Nye County.

Location	mi	km	Destinations	Notes
	0.000	0.000	Death Valley Road	Continuation beyond southern terminus; serves Death Valley National Park
Beatty	8.840	14.227	US 95 (Veterans Memorial Highway) – Las Vegas, Tonopah, Reno	Northern terminus
1.000 mi = 1.609 km; 1.000 km = 0.621 mi
