= Carson Airport =

Airport in Nevada, United States

Carson Airport Carson City Airport

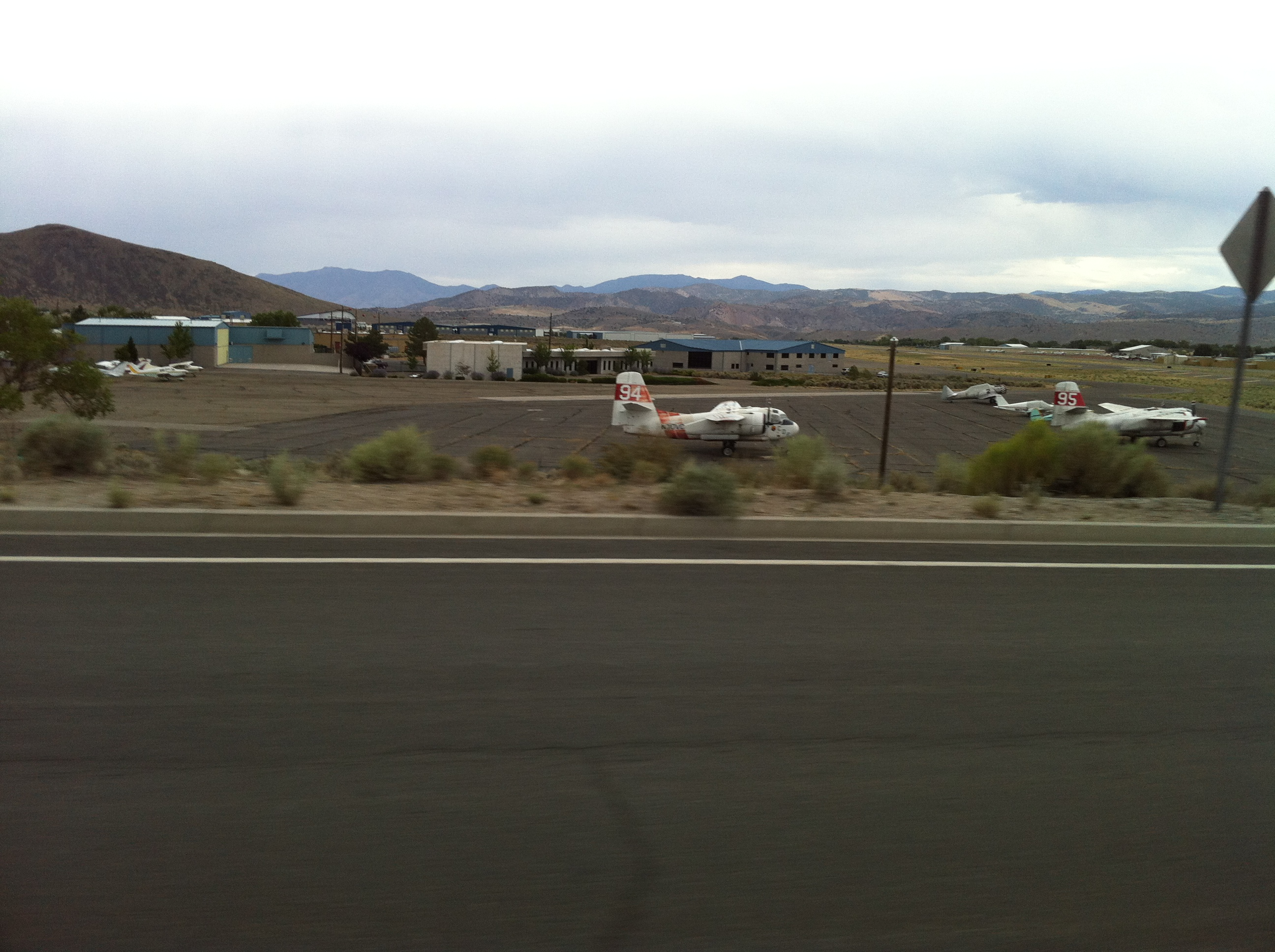
- IATA: CSN; ICAO: KCXP; FAA LID: CXP

Summary
- Airport type: Public
- Operator: Carson City Airport Authority
- Serves: Carson City, Nevada
- Elevation AMSL: 4,704 ft (1,434 m)
- Coordinates: 39°11′32″N 119°44′04″W
- Website: http://flycarsoncity.com

Map
- Location of airport in Nevada / United States CXP (the United States)

Runways
Direction	Length		Surface
Direction	ft	m	Surface
09/27	6,101	1,860	Asphalt

Statistics (2022)
- Aircraft operations (year ending 6/30/2022): 86,088
- Based aircraft (2022): 285
- Source: FAA and airport web site

Carson Airport (IATA: CSN, ICAO: KCXP, FAA LID: CXP) (Carson City Airport) is three miles northeast of Carson City, the capital of Nevada, United States. It is operated by the Carson City Airport Authority. The FAA's National Plan of Integrated Airport Systems for 2009–2013 categorized it as a reliever airport.

Many U.S. airports use the same three-letter location identifier for the FAA and IATA, but this airport is CXP to the FAA and CSN to the IATA (which assigned CXP to Tunggul Wulung Airport in Java, Indonesia).

== Facilities ==
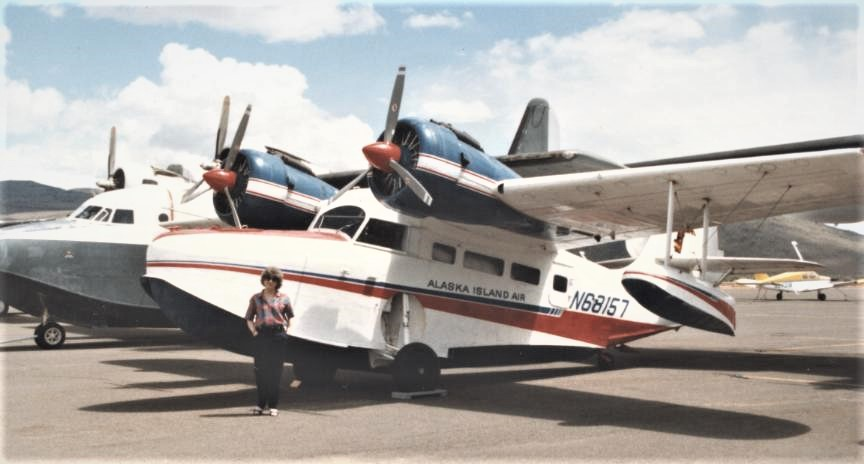
Grumman Goose amphibian at Carson Airport

Carson Airport covers 632 acres (256 ha) at an elevation of 4,704 feet (1,434 m). Its runway (9/27) is 6,101 by 75 feet (1,860 x 23 m).

In the year ending June 30, 2022 the airport had 86,088 aircraft operations, average 236 per day: 90% general aviation, 9% air taxi, and 1% military. 285 aircraft were then based at this airport: 199 single-engine, 36 multi-engine, 20 jet, 17 helicopter, 5 glider and 8 ultralight. Based aircraft include several amphibians that fly to and land on nearby Lake Tahoe.

== History ==
In 1928, three families donated 76 acres (31 ha) of land for the city to construct an airport. An east–west runway was constructed on new land to utilize the westerly winds caused by the geographic position of the Sierra Nevada.

== Historical airline service ==
From late 1984 through early 1985, SkyWest Airlines operated nonstop service to Las Vegas (LAS) twice a day with Fairchild Swearingen Metroliner commuter propjets.

== See also ==
- List of airports in Nevada
