= U.S. Route 395 Business (Carson City, Nevada) =

Business route in Carson City, Nevada

U.S. Route 395 Business
- Carson Street
- US 395 Bus. highlighted in red

Route information
- Maintained by City of Carson City
- Length: 5.7 mi (9.2 km)
- Existed: February 16, 2006–present

Major junctions
- South end: I-580 / US 50 / US 395 in Carson City
- North end: I-580 / US 395 in Carson City

Location
- Country: United States
- State: Nevada

Highway system
- United States Numbered Highway System; List; Special; Divided; Nevada State Highway System; Interstate; US; State; Pre‑1976; Scenic
← SR 525	SR 529	→ SR 530

U.S. Route 395 Business (US 395 Bus.) is a business route of US 395 in Carson City, Nevada. The route provides access to downtown Carson City from Interstate 580 (I-580). The route was originally part of mainline US 395 before it was realigned around Carson City along I-580. Although still signed as US 395 Business, the route is no longer part maintained by the Nevada Department of Transportation (NDOT) and the ownership has been transferred to Carson City.

== Route description ==
US 395 Bus. begins at an intersection with I-580 north/US 50/US 395 on the south side of Carson City. From there, it proceeds north along Carson Street towards downtown Carson City. The route is a major arterial thoroughfare within the urban area. The route continues straight through the heart of Carson City. US 395 Bus. ends at a northbound merge into I-580/US 395.

== History ==
Prior to the construction of I-580, it was the main route of US 395 through Carson City.

=== State Route 529 ===
State Route 529
- Location: Carson City, Nevada
- Length: 1.987 mi (3.198 km)
- Existed: December 29, 1994–present

State Route 529 (SR 529) is a state highway designation that exists concurrently with US 395 Bus. and was the state route designation of the section of the route. At their meeting on November 14, 2018, NDOT's Board of Directors voted to transfer ownership of the remainder of SR 529 (between I-580 and Fairview Drive) to Carson City, in order to facilitate the city's goal to construct a complete streets project on South Carson Street. However, as of January 2026, this has still not happened, as SR 529 is still listed on NDOT's list of state-maintained highways.

== Major intersections ==
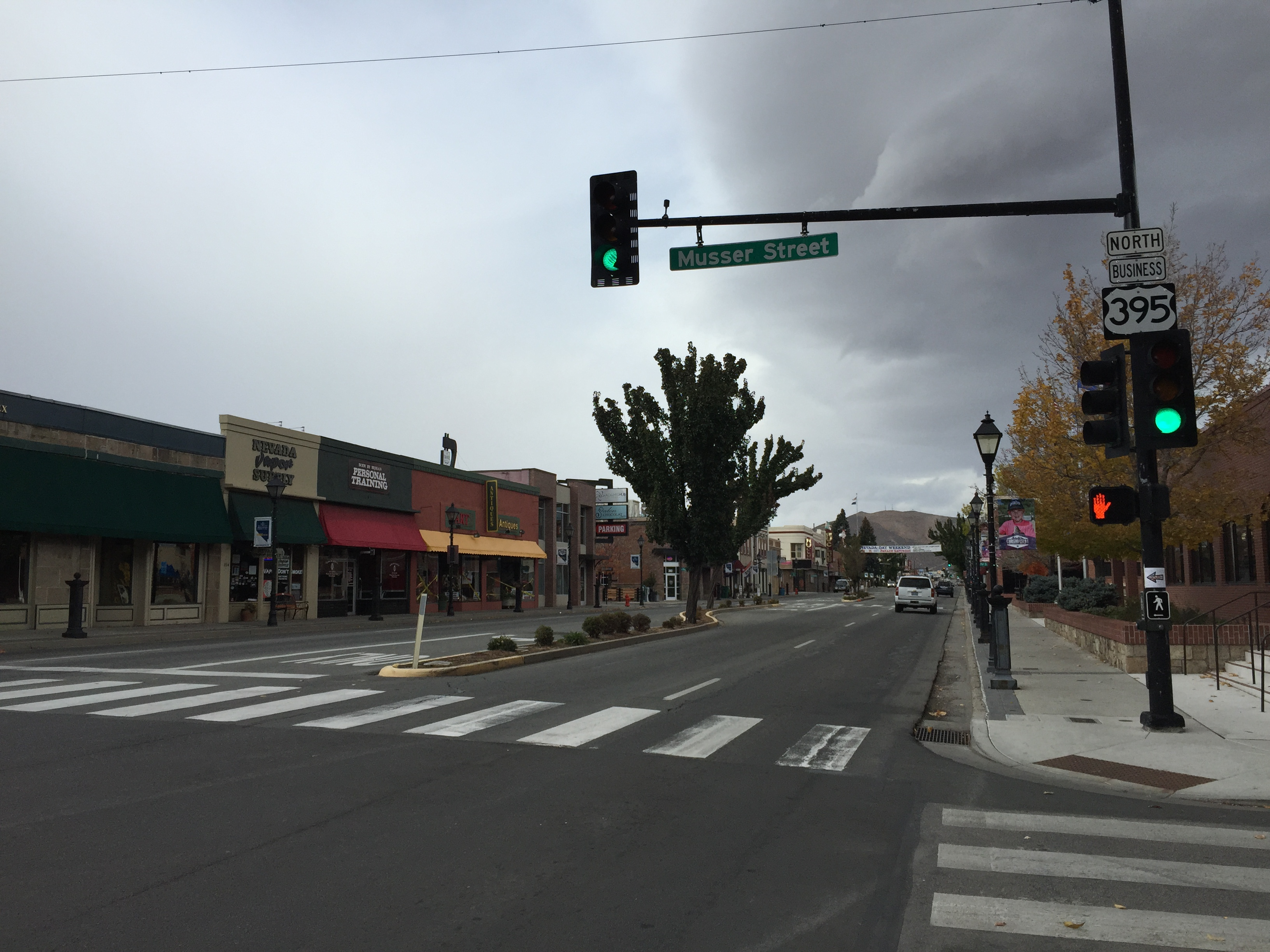
View northbound along US 395 Bus. in Downtown Carson City as seen in 2015

The entire route is in Carson City.

mi	km	Destinations	Notes
0.0	0.0	I-580 north / US 50 / US 395 – Reno, Fallon, South Lake Tahoe, Minden, Gardnerville	Southern terminus; southern end of US 50 Bus. concurrency
0.4	0.64	Snyder Avenue	Former SR 518 east
2.0	3.2	Fairview Drive, Access Road	Fairview Drive was former US 50 east/US 395 north
3.5	5.6	US 50 Bus. east (William Street) – Dayton, Fallon	Northern end of US 50 Bus. concurrency; former SR 530 east/US 50 east/US 395 north
4.9	7.9	College Parkway	Former SR 531 east
5.4	8.7	Arrowhead Drive	
5.7	9.2	I-580 north / US 395 north – Reno	Interchange; northbound entrance and southbound exit; northern terminus; I-580 exit 8
1.000 mi = 1.609 km; 1.000 km = 0.621 mi: Concurrency terminus
