= List of state routes in Nevada prior to 1976 =

Nevada State Routes prior to 1976
- Modern route marker for State Route 1

System information
- Maintained by NDOT
- State: State Route X (SR X)

System links
- Nevada State Highway System; Interstate; US; State; Pre‑1976; Scenic

This article is part of the highway renumbering series.
Alabama	1928, 1957
Arkansas	1926
California	1964
Colorado	1953, 1968
Connecticut	1932, 1963
Florida	1945
Indiana	1926
Iowa	1926, 1969
Louisiana	1955
Maine	1933
Massachusetts	1933
Minnesota	1934
Missouri	1926
Montana	1932
Nebraska	1926
Nevada	1976
New Jersey	1927, 1953
New Mexico	1988
New York	1927, 1930
North Carolina	1934, 1937, 1940, 1961
Ohio	1923, 1927, 1962
Pennsylvania	1928, 1961
Puerto Rico	1953
South Carolina	1928, 1937
South Dakota	1927, 1975
Tennessee	1983
Texas	1939
Utah	1962, 1977
Virginia	1923, 1928, 1933, 1940, 1958
Washington	1964
Wisconsin	1926
Wyoming	1927

Nevada is a state in the United States. Nevada's original State Routes were developed beginning in 1917 upon the creation of the Nevada Department of Highways. Route numbers were not assigned according to any particular numbering system, and sequential numbers were often scattered throughout the state. For example, while State Routes 27 and 28 were designated along highways near Lake Tahoe in northwestern Nevada, State Route 29 connected to Death Valley in central Nevada and State Route 30 was connected to Utah in northeastern Nevada. Additionally, several suffixed highways, branching from the original parent route, were also designated. The numbering of state routes was designated in state laws by the Nevada Legislature (codified in the Nevada Revised Statutes in later years); this had the side effect of many routes not being fully owned or maintained by the state.

During the 1976 renumbering of Nevada's state highway system, the majority of Nevada's two-digit routes were eliminated. Most of the old two-digit routes were reassigned to one or more of the new three-digit highway numbers (State Routes 28, 88, and 140 were the only routes to keep their pre-1976 numbers). Other routes were immediately eliminated from the state highway system, while a select few retained their pre-1976 numbers on official state maps into the 1980s only to be later reassigned or decommissioned. Prior designated routes that were not maintained by the highway department were removed from the state highway system, and routes were no longer legally defined in state law.

== List ==
Number	Length (mi)	Length (km)	Southern or western terminus	Northern or eastern terminus	Formed	Removed	Notes
SR 1	—	—	—	—	1929	1939	Replaced by US 40
SR 1A	—	—	—	—	—	1976	
SR 1B	—	—	—	—	—	1976	
SR 1C	—	—	—	—	—	1976	
SR 2	—	—	—	—	1919	1926	Replaced by US 50
SR 2A	—	—	—	—	—	1976	
SR 2B	—	—	—	—	—	1976	
SR 2C	—	—	—	—	—	1976	
SR 3	336.200	541.061	California state line near Oasis	US 395 at Holbrook Junction	1929	1978	
SR 3A	—	—	—	—	—	1976	
SR 3B	—	—	—	—	—	1976	
SR 3C	—	—	—	—	—	1976	
SR 4	—	—	—	—	—	1976	
SR 5	—	—	California state line near Palm Gardens	SR 3 (now SR 266) at Lida Junction		1976	Replaced by US 95
SR 5A	—	—	—	—	—	1976	
SR 5B	—	—	—	—	—	1976	
SR 5C	—	—	—	—	—	1976	
SR 6	—	—	—	—	—	1976	
SR 6A	—	—	—	—	—	1976	
SR 6B	—	—	—	—	—	1976	
SR 6C	—	—	—	—	—	1976	
SR 7	—	—	—	—	—	1976	
SR 8	—	—	—	—	—	1976	
SR 8A	—	—	—	—	—	1976	
SR 8B	—	—	—	—	—	1976	
SR 9	—	—	—	—	—	1976	
SR 10	—	—	—	—	—	1976	
SR 11	—	—	—	—	—	1976	
SR 11A	—	—	—	—	—	1976	
SR 12	—	—	—	—	—	1976	
SR 13	—	—	—	—	—	1976	
SR 14	—	—	—	—	—	1976	
SR 15	—	—	—	—	—	1976	
SR 16	—	—	—	—	—	1976	
SR 17	—	—	—	—	—	1976	
SR 18	—	—	—	—	—	1976	
SR 18A	—	—	—	—	—	1976	
SR 19	—	—	—	—	—	1976	
SR 20	—	—	—	—	—	1976	
SR 21	—	—	—	—	—	1976	
SR 22	—	—	—	—	—	1976	
SR 23	—	—	—	—	—	1976	
SR 24	—	—	—	—	—	1976	
SR 25	—	—	—	—	—	1976	
SR 26	—	—	—	—	—	1976	
SR 27	—	—	—	—	—	1976	
SR 28	16.116	25.936	US 50 near Glenbrook	CA 28 towards Kings Beach, Cal.	1948	current	
SR 29	—	—	—	—	—	1976	
SR 30	—	—	—	—	—	1976	
SR 31	—	—	—	—	—	1976	
SR 32	—	—	—	—	—	1976	
SR 32A	—	—	—	—	—	1976	
SR 33	—	—	—	—	—	1976	
SR 33A	—	—	—	—	—	1976	
SR 33B	—	—	—	—	—	1976	
SR 34	—	—	—	—	—	1976	
SR 34A	—	—	—	—	—	1976	
SR 35	—	—	—	—	—	1976	
SR 36	—	—	—	—	—	1976	
SR 37	—	—	—	—	—	1976	
SR 38	—	—	—	—	—	1976	
SR 38A	—	—	—	—	—	1976	
SR 39	—	—	—	—	—	1976	
SR 40	—	—	—	—	—	1976	
SR 41	—	—	—	—	—	1976	
SR 41A	—	—	—	—	—	1976	
SR 42	—	—	—	—	—	1976	
SR 42	—	—	—	—	—	1976	
SR 43	—	—	—	—	—	1976	
SR 44	—	—	—	—	—	1976	
SR 45	—	—	—	—	—	1976	
SR 46	—	—	—	—	—	1976	
SR 47	—	—	—	—	—	1976	
SR 48	—	—	—	—	—	1976	
SR 49	—	—	—	—	—	1976	
SR 50	—	—	—	—	—	1976	
SR 51	—	—	—	—	—	1976	
SR 51	—	—	—	—	—	1976	
SR 52	—	—	—	—	—	1976	
SR 53	—	—	—	—	—	1976	
SR 54	—	—	—	—	—	1976	
SR 55	—	—	—	—	—	1976	
SR 56	—	—	—	—	—	1976	
SR 57	—	—	—	—	—	1976	
SR 58	—	—	—	—	—	1976	
SR 59	—	—	—	—	—	1976	
SR 60	—	—	—	—	—	1976	
SR 60	—	—	—	—	—	1976	
SR 61	—	—	—	—	—	1976	
SR 62	—	—	—	—	—	1976	
SR 63	—	—	—	—	—	1976	
SR 64	—	—	—	—	—	1976	
SR 65	—	—	—	—	—	1976	
SR 66	—	—	—	—	—	1976	
SR 67	—	—	—	—	—	1976	
SR 68	—	—	—	—	—	1976	
SR 69	—	—	—	—	—	1976	Renumbered to SR 377 because of the sexual connotation of the number.
SR 70	—	—	—	—	—	1976	
SR 70	—	—	—	—	—	1976	
SR 71	—	—	—	—	—	1976	
SR 72	—	—	—	—	—	1976	
SR 73	—	—	—	—	—	1976	
SR 74	—	—	—	—	—	1976	
SR 75	—	—	—	—	—	1976	
SR 76	—	—	—	—	—	1976	
SR 77	—	—	—	—	—	1976	
SR 78	—	—	—	—	—	1976	
SR 79	—	—	—	—	—	1976	
SR 80	—	—	—	—	—	1976	
SR 81	—	—	—	—	—	1976	
SR 82	—	—	—	—	—	1976	
SR 83	—	—	—	—	—	1976	
SR 84	—	—	—	—	—	1976	
SR 85	—	—	—	—	—	1976	
SR 85	—	—	—	—	—	1976	
SR 86	—	—	—	—	—	1976	
SR 88	7.868	12.662	CA 88 towards Woodfords, Cal.	US 395 in Minden	1957	current	
SR 89	—	—	—	—	—	1976	
SR 90	—	—	—	—	—	1976	
SR 91	—	—	—	—	—	1976	
SR 92	—	—	—	—	—	1976	
SR 93	—	—	—	—	—	1976	
SR 94	—	—	—	—	—	1976	
SR 140	110.113	177.210	Oregon state line on OR 140 towards Adel, Ore.	US 95 south of Orovada	c. 1968	current	Briefly designated SR 291 after 1976
Former

== See also ==
- Transportation in Nevada
