= Nevada Department of Transportation =

Nevada state government agency

Nevada Department of Transportation (NDOT)

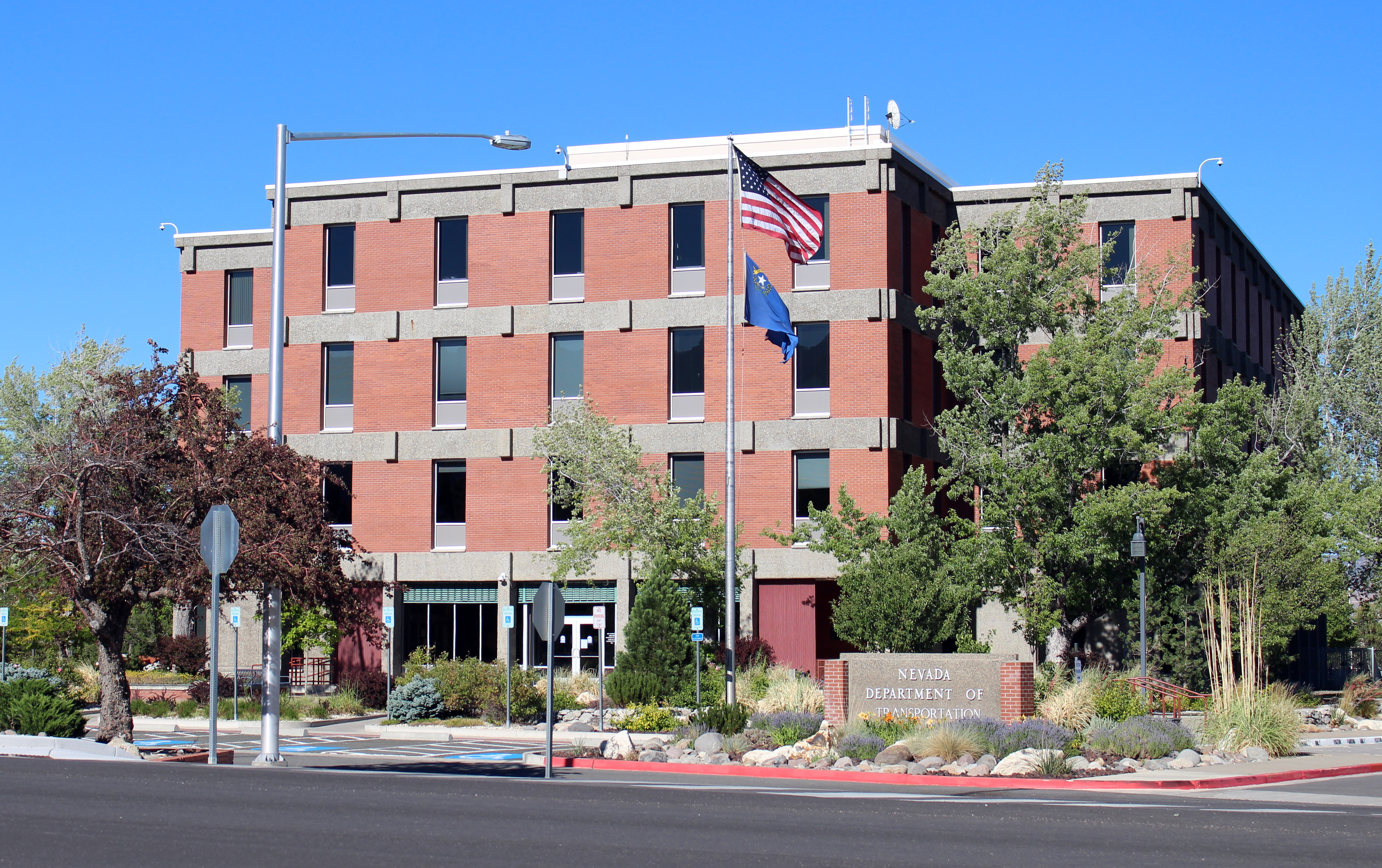
- NDOT headquarters in Carson City

Agency overview
- Formed: March 23, 1917; 109 years ago Carson City, Nevada, U.S.
- Preceding agency: Nevada Department of Highways
- Jurisdiction: State of Nevada
- Headquarters: 1263 South Stewart Street Carson City, Nevada, U.S.
- Agency executives: Tracy Larkin Thomason, P.E., Director; Sondra Rosenberg, P.T.P., Deputy Director, Planning and Administration; Mario Gomez, P.E., Deputy Director, Operations and Maintenance; Sajid Sulahria, P.E., Deputy Director, Project Delivery and Engineering
- Parent agency: State of Nevada
- Website: dot.nv.gov

The Nevada Department of Transportation (Nevada DOT or NDOT) is a government agency in the U.S. state of Nevada. NDOT is responsible for maintaining and improving Nevada's highway system, which includes U.S. highways and Interstate highways within the state's boundaries. The department is notable for its aggressively proactive approach to highway maintenance. Nevada state roads and bridges have also been named some of the nation's best.

The state of Nevada is facing a multibillion-dollar transportation funding deficit, and NDOT is developing potential transportation funding sources through the Pioneer Program and Vehicle Miles Traveled Fee Study.

For those driving in Nevada, NDOT offers updated road conditions and construction reports through the 511 Nevada Travel Info system. NDOT headquarters is located on Stewart Street (former State Route 520) in Carson City, Nevada.

== History ==
Although the department has existed since 1917 as the Department of Highways, its current structure was only established in 1979. The department served as a section of the Department of Agriculture from 1893 to 1917, when it finally became a separate entity. True to its name, the Department of Highways has focused mostly on creating roads that can accommodate automobiles since its year of inception. It was also involved in the construction of the Hoover Dam. When the current model of the department was created in 1979, the division had four divisions: administrative division, operations division, engineering division, and planning division, which are similarly structured as its current form. But it did not yet have a chief engineer role, which exists in its present organization structure.

== Divisions ==
The current Department of Transportation supervises five divisions, which are the following:

=== Administration Division ===
The division consists of the following sub-divisions: accounting, administrative services, civil rights/disadvantaged business enterprises, communications, financial forecasting, financial management, flight operations, and information technology.

=== Engineering Division ===
These subdivisions fall under the purveyor of the Engineering Division: design, environmental program, location, project management, right of way, and structure.

=== Operations Division ===
There are six subdivisions within the Operations Division: construction, equipment, maintenance and asset management, materials, geotechnical, and traffic operations.

=== Planning Division ===
The division has the largest number of subdivisions in comparison to the others, which are: aviation, bicycle and pedestrian, Connecting Nevada, freight, performance analysis, public transit, rail, research, roadway systems, traffic safety engineering, traffic information, and transportation planning.

=== Stormwater Program Division ===
The four subdivisions that make up the Stormwater Program Division are:

- Report an Illicit Discharge
- MS4 Permit
- Mapping Inventory
- Training

== See also ==
- List of Nevada state agencies
- List of state routes in Nevada
- U.S. Department of Transportation
